= Down Every Road 1962–1994 =

Box set by Merle Haggard
- Released: April 1996
- Genre: Country
- Length: 282:26
- Label: Capitol
- Producer: Various

Down Every Road 1962–1994 is a compilation album by American country singer Merle Haggard, released in 1996. It covers music from his earliest work in the early 1960s to his Epic Records releases of the late 1980s. The boxed set includes three CDs of material recorded for Capitol Records (up to 1977) and one of Haggard's later MCA and Epic recordings.

== Composition ==
Down Every Road 1962–1994 comprises 100 songs recorded from 1962 through 1994, across four CDs. Each CD represents a different period of Haggard's career. The first CD includes songs from 1962 through 1967, when Haggard released his first few albums with Capitol Records. After a three-year stint in San Quentin State Prison, Haggard rekindled his interest in music, and became one of the leading artists in the Bakersfield sound genre. The CD contains some of Haggard's first hit singles, such as "(My Friends Are Gonna Be) Strangers", "The Fugitive", and "Branded Man". The latter two songs contain semi-autobiographical lyrics about prison, which is a common theme found on many songs from the first CD. Additionally, the CD contains some of Haggard's first known recordings with Talley Records, such as "Skid Row" and "Sing a Sad Song".

== Critical reception ==
Professional ratings
Review scores
Source	Rating
Allmusic	5/5 stars
Entertainment Weekly	A
Los Angeles Times	4 Stars

Stephen Thomas Erlewine of AllMusic deems the album "not just the perfect Merle Haggard box set, it's one of the greatest box sets ever released as well, since it truly presents all sides of its subject, while offering nothing but sheer pleasure in terms of mere listening." Robert Hillburn of the Los Angeles Times wrote: "Merle Haggard writes of troubled souls and sweet dreams with the timeless simplicity of a great folk artist, while singing with the soulfulness and conviction of a classic bluesman. There is also in his body of work the independence and renegade attitude of a legendary rocker. It's no wonder that he is one of the most commanding artists of the modern pop era... The only weakness in this four-disc package is that it shortchanges Haggard's post-Capitol years."

It was ranked at number 477 on the 2012 updated version of Rolling Stone's "500 Greatest Albums of All Time" list, stating that it "is the ultimate collection from one of country's finest singers." It was ranked at number 284 in the 2020 update.

== Personnel ==
- Merle Haggard – vocals, guitar

The Strangers:

- Roy Nichols – lead guitar
- Norman Hamlet – steel guitar
- Tiny Moore – mandolin, fiddle
- Eldon Shamblin – guitar
- Ralph Mooney – steel guitar
- Gene Price – bass
- Gordon Terry – fiddle
- Ronnie Reno – guitar
- Bobby Wayne – guitar
- Marcia Nichols – guitar
- Clint Strong – guitar
- Mark Yeary – piano
- George French – piano
- Dennis Hromek – bass
- James Tittle – bass
- Johnny Meeks – bass
- Jerry Ward – bass
- Wayne Durham – bass
- Biff Adam – drums
- Eddie Burris – drums
- Don Markham – saxophone
- Jimmy Belkin – fiddle
- Gary Church – horns

== Track listing ==
All tracks are written by Merle Haggard except where noted.

1962–1967
No.	Title	Writer(s)	Album	Length
1.	"Skid Row"		non-album single	1:46
2.	"Sing a Sad Song"	Wynn Stewart	Strangers	2:33
3.	"You Don't Even Try"	Merle Haggard, Fuzzy Owen	Strangers	2:16
4.	"Sam Hill"	Tommy Collins	Strangers	2:32
5.	"(My Friends Are Gonna Be) Strangers"	Liz Anderson	Strangers	2:29
6.	"Just Between the Two of Us" (with Bonnie Owens)	Liz Anderson	Just Between the Two of Us	2:44
7.	"If I Had Left It Up to You"		Strangers	2:23
8.	"I'm Gonna Break Every Heart I Can"		Strangers	1:59
9.	"Swinging Doors"		Swinging Doors and the Bottle Let Me Down	2:52
10.	"The Bottle Let Me Down"		Swinging Doors and the Bottle Let Me Down	2:47
11.	"High on a Hilltop"	Tommy Collins	Swinging Doors and the Bottle Let Me Down	2:58
12.	"I'll Look Over You"		Swinging Doors and the Bottle Let Me Down	2:09
13.	"The Fugitive"	Liz Anderson, Casey Anderson	I'm a Lonesome Fugitive	2:57
14.	"House of Memories"		I'm a Lonesome Fugitive	2:46
15.	"All of Me Belongs to You"		I'm a Lonesome Fugitive	2:40
16.	"Mary's Mine"	Jerry Ward	I'm a Lonesome Fugitive	2:56
17.	"Someone Told My Story"		I'm a Lonesome Fugitive	2:32
18.	"Go Home"	Tommy Collins	Branded Man	2:34
19.	"Whatever Happened to Me"		I'm a Lonesome Fugitive	2:57
20.	"Loneliness Is Eating Me Alive"	Hank Cochran	Branded Man	2:34
21.	"I Threw Away the Rose"		Branded Man	3:20
22.	"Branded Man"		Branded Man	3:06
23.	"You Don't Have Very Far to Go"	Merle Haggard, Joe Simpson, Red Simpson	Branded Man	2:19
24.	"Somewhere Between"	Bonnie Owens, Merle Haggard	Branded Man	3:05
25.	"Sing Me Back Home"		Sing Me Back Home	2:48
26.	"The Son of Hickory Holler's Tramp"	Dallas Frazier	Sing Me Back Home	2:58
27.	"Seeing Eye Dog"		Sing Me Back Home	1:58

1968–1970
No.	Title	Length
28.	"The Legend of Bonnie And Clyde"	2:04
29.	"I Started Loving You Again"	2:21
30.	"Is This The Beginning Of The End?"	3:02
31.	"I'll Always Know"	2:21
32.	"Mama Tried"	2:12
33.	"In The Good Old Days (When Times Were Bad)"	2:44
34.	"Teach Me To Forget"	3:14
35.	"I'm Looking For My Mind"	2:09
36.	"The Day The Rains Came"	2:39
37.	"California Blues (Blue Yodel #4)"	2:49
38.	"I Take a Lot of Pride in What I Am"	2:47
39.	"I'm Bringin' Home Good News"	2:47
40.	"I Can't Hold Myself In Line"	2:54
41.	"It Meant Goodbye To Me When You Said Hello To Him"	2:31
42.	"Hungry Eyes"	3:27
43.	"Silver Wings"	2:43
44.	"Waitin' For A Train"	2:50
45.	"Jimmie Rodgers' Last Blue Yodel (The Women Make A Fool Out Of Me)"	3:06
46.	"California Cottonfields"	2:46
47.	"White Line Fever"	2:48
48.	"Workin' Man Blues"	2:34
49.	"Okie From Muskogee"	2:42
50.	"I Can't Stop Loving You" (Live)	2:53
51.	"Huntsville"	3:06
52.	"Irma Jackson"	2:26
53.	"The Fightin' Side of Me"	2:52
54.	"I'll Be A Hero (When I Strike)"	2:02

1970–1976
No.	Title	Length
55.	"Right Or Wrong"	2:35
56.	"Trouble In Mind"	3:13
57.	"Stay a Little Longer"	2:47
58.	"The Farmer's Daughter"	2:54
59.	"Tulare Dust"	1:46
60.	"Carolyn"	2:32
61.	"Someday We'll Look Back"	2:29
62.	"Daddy Frank (The Guitar Man)"	3:09
63.	"Grandma Harp"	2:10
64.	"It's Not Love (But It's Not Bad)"	3:19
65.	"I Wonder If They Ever Think of Me"	2:49
66.	"If We Make It Through December"	2:41
67.	"The Emptiest Arms in the World"	2:51
68.	"Everybody's Had the Blues" (Live rehearsal)	3:05
69.	"Things Aren't Funny Anymore"	2:41
70.	"Honky Tonk Night Time Man"	2:37
71.	"Holding Things Together"	2:57
72.	"Here In Frisco"	2:28
73.	"Kentucky Gambler"	2:39
74.	"Always Wanting You"	3:05
75.	"Living With The Shades Pulled Down"	2:55
76.	"Running Kind"	3:01
77.	"It's All In The Movies"	3:11
78.	"The Way It Was In '51"	3:20
79.	"I Never Go Around Mirrors"	2:43
80.	"What Have You Got Planned Tonight Diana"	3:06

1977–1994
No.	Title	Length
81.	"If We're Not Back in Love by Monday"	3:15
82.	"Ramblin' Fever"	3:10
83.	"It's Been a Great Afternoon"	2:48
84.	"Red Bandana"	2:34
85.	"Footlights"	2:56
86.	"My Own Kind of Hat"	2:56
87.	"Misery and Gin"	2:48
88.	"Leonard"	3:27
89.	"I Think I'll Just Stay Here and Drink"	4:31
90.	"Rainbow Stew" (Live)	2:36
91.	"Big City"	3:00
92.	"Are the Good Times Really Over (I Wish a Buck Was Still Silver)"	4:15
93.	"You Take Me for Granted"	2:39
94.	"Pancho and Lefty"	4:46
95.	"That's the Way Love Goes"	3:02
96.	"Someday When Things Are Good"	3:33
97.	"Let's Chase Each Other Around the Room"	2:48
98.	"Kern River"	3:21
99.	"Twinkle, Twinkle Lucky Star"	3:23
100.	"In My Next Life"	3:48
