= A Tribute to the Best Damn Fiddle Player in the World (or, My Salute to Bob Wills) =

Studio album by Merle Haggard
- Released: November 16, 1970
- Genre: Country, Western swing
- Length: 37:05
- Label: Capitol
- Producer: Earl Ball

Merle Haggard chronology
The Fightin' Side of Me (1970)	A Tribute to the Best Damn Fiddle Player in the World (or, My Salute to Bob Wills) (1970)	Hag (1971)

A Tribute to the Best Damn Fiddle Player in the World (or, My Salute to Bob Wills) is the eleventh studio album by Merle Haggard backed by the Strangers, released in 1970.

== Background ==
Although it is often assumed that Haggard, who was enjoying enormous success with the social commentary "Okie from Muskogee" and the politically charged "The Fightin' Side of Me" in 1969 and 1970, sought to distance himself from controversy by returning to his musical roots by recording a tribute to his childhood idol Bob Wills, this is not quite accurate; according to David Cantwell's book Merle Haggard: The Running Kind, by the time Haggard's live album The Fightin' Side of Me appeared in 1970, the Wills album had already been completed for four months. Haggard gathered up six of the remaining members of The Texas Playboys to record the tribute: Johnnie Lee Wills, Eldon Shamblin, Tiny Moore, Joe Holley, Johnny Gimble, and Alex Brashear. Merle's band the Strangers were also present during the recording but unfortunately Wills suffered a massive stroke after the first day of recording. Merle arrived on the second day, devastated that he would not get to record with him.

Haggard spent a few scant months learning the fiddle, an instrument that he had not touched since his childhood violin lessons. Unlike Haggard's previous tribute album to Jimmie Rodgers, which gave the original songs a new sound, his Wills LP remained true to the original arrangements. As Cantwell observes, "The album's most charming quality, its attention to authentic period detail, is a built-in limitation it never entirely transcends." Completely apolitical, the album reached number 2 on the Billboard Country Albums Chart and peaked at number 58 on the Pop Album Chart, his highest showing there to date. The album would play a crucial role in the revitalization of Western Swing music and inspire younger musicians like Asleep at the Wheel and Commander Cody and His Lost Planet Airmen.

Haggard would do more tribute albums to Wills over the next 40 years. In 1973 he appeared on For the Last Time Bob Wills and His Texas Playboys. In 1994 Haggard collaborated with Asleep at the Wheel and many other artists influenced by the music of Bob Wills on an album entitled Tribute to the Music of Bob Wills and the Texas Playboys. A Tribute was re-released on CD on the Koch label in 1995 with both the original Haggard liner notes and new notes by country music and western swing historian Rich Kienzle, who described the album's influence on his interest in delving deeper into Wills and his legacy.

== Reception ==
Professional ratings
Review scores
Source	Rating
AllMusic	5/5 stars
Christgau's Record Guide	B+

AllMusic critic Stephen Thomas Erlewine called the album "a ragged, enthusiastic good time. Haggard, the Strangers, and the Playboys play their hearts out, breathing life into Wills warhorses... while bringing attention to lesser-known songs... The fact that Western swing re-established itself as a viable country genre after the release of A Tribute to the Best Damn Fiddle Player is a testament to the power and charm of this record." Robert Christgau wrote, "Now that's the Merle I trust. His uncountrypolitan formal sense has always gone along with a reverence for history, and his subtle, surprisingly tranquil, yet passionate singing style - all that yodel and straining head voice—was made for Wills's pop-jazz-country amalgam."

== Track listing ==
=== Side one ===
1. "Brown Skinned Gal" (Bob Wills) – 2:50
2. "Right Or Wrong" (Paul Biese, Haven Gillespie, Arthur Sizemore) – 2:36
3. "Brain Cloudy Blues" (Tommy Duncan, Bob Wills) – 3:38
4. "Stay a Little Longer" (Duncan, Wills) – 2:48
5. "Misery" (Duncan, Tiny Moore, Wills) – 3:19
6. "Time Changes Everything" (Duncan) – 2:36

=== Side two ===
1. "San Antonio Rose" (Wills) – 2:53
2. "I Knew The Moment I Lost You" (Duncan, Wills) – 3:00
3. "Roly Poly" (Fred Rose) – 2:39
4. "Old Fashioned Love" (James P. Johnson, Cecil Mack) – 2:32
5. "Corrine, Corrina" (Bo Chatmon, Mitchell Parish, J. Mayo Williams) – 2:16
6. "Take Me Back to Tulsa" (Duncan, Wills) – 2:38

== Personnel ==
- Merle Haggard – vocals, guitar, fiddle

The Strangers:

- Roy Nichols – lead guitar
- Norman Hamlet – steel guitar, dobro
- Bobby Wayne – rhythm guitar, harmony vocals
- Dennis Hromek – bass, background vocals
- Biff Adam – drums

with

- Eldon Shamblin – guitar
- Tiny Moore – fiddle, mandolin
- Johnny Gimble – fiddle
- George French – piano

and

- Johnnie Lee Wills– banjo
- Alex Brashear – trumpet
- Joe Holley – fiddle
