= Songs for the Mama That Tried =

Studio album by Merle Haggard
- Released: September 1981
- Recorded: Sound Emporium (Nashville, Tennessee)
- Genres: Country, gospel
- Length: 33:07
- Label: MCA
- Producer: Merle Haggard

Merle Haggard chronology
Rainbow Stew Live at Anaheim Stadium (1980)	Songs for the Mama That Tried (1981)	Big City (1981)

Songs for the Mama That Tried is the 32nd studio album by the American country music singer Merle Haggard with backing by the Strangers, released in 1981 by MCA Records. A gospel album, it reached No. 46 on the Billboard country albums chart.

== Background ==
Songs for the Mama That Tried was Haggard's last principal release on MCA, having signed with Epic Records. The title alludes to Haggard's 1968 song "Mama Tried", a song which became a cornerstone of his career. Haggard had recorded a live gospel album in 1971 called The Land of Many Churches, but this set is dedicated to his mother Flossie, who was seventy-nine years old when she posed with Haggard on the cover of the LP. Produced by Haggard, the album features background harmonies from both his second wife, Bonnie Owens, and his then current wife, Leona Williams.

The album yielded no hit singles and was not a big seller. In his 1999 memoir My House of Memories, Haggard writes, "I love those songs as much as Mom did. I can't describe the comfort they've given me. I haven't listened to that album in years."

== Critical reception ==
Professional ratings
Review scores
Source	Rating
AllMusic	3/5 stars

Writing in the 2013 book The Running Kind, Haggard biographer David Cantwell calls the album "perfect", praising the singer's "reverent, soulful singing."

The album received five stars in the second edition of the Rolling Stone Record Guide.

== Track listing ==
Side one

1. "When God Comes and Gathers His Jewels" (Hiriam Williams, Hank Williams) – 2:57
2. "Supper Time" (Ira Stanphill) – 2:42
3. "He Walks with Me (In the Garden)" (Traditional; arranged by T. Whitson) – 2:18
4. "Softly and Tenderly" (Will Thompson) – 3:00
5. "Why Me" (Kris Kristofferson) – 3:09

Side two

1. "Where No One Stands Alone" (Mosie Lister) – 3:00
2. "One Day at a Time" (Marijohn Wilkin, Kristofferson) – 3:16
3. "What a Friend We Have in Jesus" (Joseph Scriven, Charles Converse) – 2:33
4. "Swing Low, Sweet Chariot" (Traditional; arranged by T. Whitson) – 3:35
5. "The Old Rugged Cross" (Rev. George Bennard) – 3:44
6. "Keep on the Sunny Side" (A. P. Carter) – 2:53

== Personnel ==
Credits adapted from LP liner notes.

Musicians

- Merle Haggard – vocals, lead guitar
- Leona Haggard – vocals, harmony
- Bonnie Owens – vocals, harmony
- Norman Hamlet – steel guitar
- Roy Nichols – lead guitar
- Don Markham – horns (saxophone, trumpet)
- Biff Adams – drums
- Dennis Hromek – bass guitar
- Mark Yeary – piano
- Kemo Kemolian – fiddle, lead guitar
- Gordon Terry – fiddle
- Ronnie Reno – rhythm guitar

Technical

- Merle Haggard – producer
- Jim Williamson – engineer
- Glenn Meadows – mastering
- Dennis Carney – photo of Merle and Mama
- Larry Du Pont – cover photo

== Chart performance ==
Chart (1981)	Peak position
U.S. Billboard Top Country Albums	46
