= My Love Affair with Trains =

Studio album by Merle Haggard and The Strangers
- Released: July 1976
- Recorded: April 1976 in Nashville, TN
- Genre: Country
- Label: Capitol
- Producer: Ken Nelson, Fuzzy Owen

Merle Haggard and The Strangers chronology
It's All in the Movies (1976)	My Love Affair with Trains (1976)	The Roots of My Raising (1976)

Singles from My Love Affair with Trains
- 1. "Here Comes the Freedom Train" Released: May 17, 1976

My Love Affair with Trains is the twentieth studio album by American country music singer Merle Haggard and The Strangers, released in 1976. The LP rose to number 7 on the Billboard country albums chart.

== Background ==
The album recalls his 1969 tribute to Jimmie Rogers, Same Train, A Different Time but, with its between song narrations and freight train sound effects, more closely resembles Johnny Cash's 1960 concept album Ride This Train. Haggard, who was also a model train enthusiast, manages only one original composition, "No More Trains to Ride". "Here Comes the Freedom Train" would be the album's only hit single, peaking at number 10 and ending Haggard's incredible run of nine consecutive #1 hits. Other notable selections include the Dolly Parton-penned title track and Jimmy Buffett's "Railroad Lady."

In addition to releasing three albums in 1976, Haggard also appeared on an episode of The Waltons, playing country singer Red Turner, a recovering alcoholic. He performs the song "Nobody's Darlin' But Mine."

== Critical reception ==
Professional ratings
Review scores
Source	Rating
AllMusic	4/5 stars

Thom Jurek of AllMusic praises the album, maintaining that Haggard "weaves an iconographic history of the rails - from past to present to uncertain future - seamlessly and with great taste... [The album] may seem a bit quaint in retrospect, but its soul and emotion don't date. There is great truth in his performances of these songs, and like virtually everything he records, he tells the truth through these songs as he sees it."

== Track listing ==
1. "My Love Affair With Trains" (Dolly Parton)
2. "Union Station" (Ronnie Reno)
3. "Here Comes the Freedom Train" (Stephen H. Lemberg)
4. "So Long Train Whistle" (Dave Kirby, Lew Quadling)
5. "The Silver Ghost" (Sterling Whipple)
6. "No More Trains to Ride" (Merle Haggard)
7. "The Coming and the Going of the Trains" (Red Lane)
8. "I Won't Give Up My Train" (Mark Yeary)
9. "Where Have All the Hobos Gone" (Kirby, Danny Morrison)
10. "Railroad Lady" (Jimmy Buffett, Jerry Jeff Walker)
11. "The Hobo" (Kirby, Glenn Martin)

== Personnel ==
- Merle Haggard – vocals, guitar

The Strangers:

- Roy Nichols – lead guitar
- Norman Hamlet – steel guitar, dobro
- Tiny Moore – mandolin
- Eldon Shamblin – guitar
- Ronnie Reno – guitar
- Mark Yeary – piano
- James Tittle – bass
- Biff Adam – drums
- Don Markham – saxophone

with

- Dave Kirby – guitar
- Johnny Meeks – bass
- Johnny Gimble – fiddle

and

- Hargus "Pig" Robbins – piano, organ
- Bob Moore – bass
- Buddy Harman – drums

== Chart positions ==
Year	Chart	Position
1976	Billboard Country albums	7
