= The Epic Collection (Recorded Live) =

Live album by Merle Haggard
- Released: c. November 1983
- Genre: Country
- Length: 28:45
- Label: Epic
- Producer: Merle Haggard

Merle Haggard chronology
That's the Way Love Goes (1983)	The Epic Collection (Recorded Live) (1983)	It's All in the Game (1984)

The Epic Collection (Recorded Live) is a live album by Merle Haggard backed by The Strangers released on Epic Records in November 1983.

The title is misleading as Haggard had only been with Epic for two years in 1983, so the recording leans heavily on his Capitol-era hits. The album peaked at number 28 on the Billboard country albums chart.

== Critical reception ==
Professional ratings
Review scores
Source	Rating
AllMusic	3/5 stars

AllMusic critic Steven Thomas Erlewine stated in his review: "The atmosphere is mellow, with Haggard favoring late-night ballads—both broken-hearted and romantic—and adopting a nicely weathered saloon crooner stance. This doesn't make for the liveliest record, but it's a nice, unassuming portrait of a master at middle age playing his way through just another date."

== Track listing ==
1. "Honky Tonk Night Time Man/The Old Man From the Mountain" (Merle Haggard)
2. "Holding Things Together" (Haggard, Bob Totten)
3. "Sing a Sad Song" (Wynn Stewart)
4. "Every Fool Has a Rainbow" (Haggard)
5. "Blue Yodel #5" (Jimmie Rodgers)
6. "Trouble in Mind" (Richard M. Jones)
7. "Things Aren't Funny Anymore" (Haggard)
8. "(My Friends Are Gonna Be) Strangers" (Liz Anderson, Casey Anderson)
9. "I Always Get Lucky with You" (Haggard, Gary Church, Freddy Powers, Tex Whitson)
10. "Workin' Man Blues" (Haggard)

== Personnel ==
- Merle Haggard – vocals, guitar, fiddle

The Strangers:

- Roy Nichols – guitar
- Norm Hamlet – steel guitar
- Tiny Moore – fiddle, mandolin
- Mark Yeary – keyboards
- Dennis Hromek – bass
- Biff Adams – drums
- Jimmy Belken – fiddle
- Don Markham – horns
