= Okie from Muskogee =

Live album by Merle Haggard and the Strangers
- Released: December 29, 1969
- Recorded: 1969
- Venues: The Civic Center, Muskogee, Oklahoma
- Genre: Country
- Length: 44:20
- Label: Capitol
- Producer: Fuzzy Owen

Merle Haggard and the Strangers chronology
| A Portrait of Merle Haggard (1969) | Okie from Muskogee (1969) | The Fightin' Side of Me (1970) |

Singles from Okie from Muskogee
- 1. "Okie from Muskogee" Released: September 15, 1969

Okie from Muskogee is the first live album by Merle Haggard and the Strangers, released in October 1969 on Capitol Records.

== Background ==
The album was a recorded performance at the Civic Center in Muskogee, Oklahoma on October 10, 1969, the day before the studio version of "Okie from Muskogee" hit the national country charts.

In the documentary Beyond Nashville, Haggard claims the song, which he wrote with drummer Eddie Burris on his bus, was more of a wistful tribute to his late father than any kind of political statement. He was driving on Interstate 40 and he saw a sign that said "19 Miles to Muskogee" while listening to The World Tomorrow hosted by Garner Ted Armstrong. He then had a wave of nostalgia since people called it "back home" when he was a kid, and he wondered what his dad would think about "the youthful uprising that was occurring at the time, the Janis Joplins" if he was still alive. A week later, he was listening to Armstrong on how smaller town colleges seemed to have no problems, and he looked unto Muskogee's college, which he said did not have race or drug problem. He said "The whole thing hit me in two minutes", and he wrote the song in 20 minutes.

In the American Masters episode about his life and career, however, a more defiant Haggard states that the song was more than a satire. He thought that hippies felt superior judging America despite being unqualified and having never been restricted from it. He also criticized them for protesting a war which they didn't know more about than him.

Haggard began performing the song in concert in the fall of 1969 and was astounded at the reaction it received. As David Cantwell notes in his 2013 book Merle Haggard: The Running Kind, "The Haggard camp knew they were on to something. Everywhere they went, every show, "Okie" did more than prompt enthusiastic applause. There was an unanticipated adulation racing through the crowds now, standing ovations that went on and on and sometimes left the audience and the band-members alike teary-eyed. Merle had somehow stumbled upon a song that expressed previously inchoate fears, spoke out loud gripes and anxieties otherwise only whispered, and now people were using his song, were using him, to connect themselves to these larger concerns and to one another." The studio version topped the charts in the fall of 1969, where it remained for a month, and also hit number 41 on the pop charts, becoming Haggard's all-time biggest hit (until his 1973 crossover Christmas smash "If We Make It Through December") and signature tune.

In Haggard's episode of CMT's Inside Fame, Brian Mansfield of USA Today insists, "I think between 1966 and 1969/1970, when he's doing 'Okie from Muskogee' and 'Fightin' Side of Me,' that period was every bit the match of Hank Williams from about 1950 to 1952. I think it's that good..."

== Critical reception ==
Professional ratings
Review scores
| Source | Rating |
|---|---|
| AllMusic | 3.5/5 stars |
| Christgau's Record Guide | B |

The album topped the Billboard country albums chart and hit number 46 on the pop chart and won the Academy of Country Music award for Album of the Year in 1969. It also received the CMA Award for Album of the Year in 1970. Haggard also won Single of the Year for "Okie from Muskogee" as well as Top Male Vocalist.

Bruce Eder of AllMusic wrote, "The Bakersfield sound is very well represented, with crisp rhythms and lean leads (by Roy Nichols), and Haggard is in excellent voice.." Music critic Robert Christgau wrote "Despite some slack performances, this album.. is a passable sampler.... But The Best of Merle Haggard is a lot more representative of a great iconoclast who's keeping it under wraps these days."

== Track listing ==
All songs by Merle Haggard unless otherwise noted:

1. "Introduction by Carlton Haney" – :35
2. "Mama Tried" – 2:25
3. "No Hard Times" (Jimmie Rodgers) – 2:20
4. "Silver Wings" – 2:39
5. "Merle Receives Key to Muskogee" – 1:20
6. "Merle's Introduction to Medley" – :23
7. "Swinging Doors" – 1:16
8. "I'm a Lonesome Fugitive" (Liz Anderson, Casey Anderson) – 1:37
9. "Sing Me Back Home" – 1:24
10. "Branded Man" – 2:18
11. "In the Arms of Love" (Buck Owens, Gene Price) – 2:08
12. "Workin' Man Blues" – 2:35
13. "Merle's Introduction to "Hobo Bill"" – 1:07
14. "Hobo Bill's Last Ride" (Waldo LaFayette O'Neal) – 2:38
15. "Billy Overcame His Size" – 3:05
16. "If I Had Left It Up to You" – 2:36
17. "White Line Fever" – 3:03
18. "Blue Rock" (Norman Hamlet, Roy Nichols) – 1:09
19. "Introduction to Okie from Muskogee" – 1:47
20. "Okie from Muskogee" (Merle Haggard, Eddie Burris) – 4:05

== Personnel ==
- Merle Haggard – vocals, guitar

The Strangers:

- Roy Nichols – lead guitar
- Norman Hamlet – steel guitar, dobro
- Gene Price – bass, vocals
- Eddie Burris – drums

with

- Bonnie Owens – harmony vocals

== Chart positions ==
| Year | Chart | Position |
|---|---|---|
| 1970 | Billboard Country albums | 1 |
| 1970 | Billboard Pop albums | 46 |
| 2016 | Billboard Canadian Albums Chart | 64 |
