= Street Singer (song) =

Single by The Strangers

from the album Introducing My Friends The Strangers
- B-side: "Mexican Rose"
- Released: April 18, 1970
- Genre: Country
- Length: 2:10
- Label: Capitol
- Songwriter(s): Roy Nichols
- Producer(s): Ken Nelson

The Strangers singles chronology
"The Fightin' Side of Me" (1970)	"Street Singer" (1970)	"Jesus, Take a Hold" (1970)

"Street Singer" is a song written by Roy Nichols, and performed by American country music band The Strangers. It was released in April 1970 as the first single from their album Introducing My Friends The Strangers. The B-side was "Mexican Rose," written by Roy Nichols and Norm Hamlet. The lineup of The Strangers during this time was Roy Nichols on lead guitar, Norm Hamlet on pedal steel guitar, Bobby Wayne on rhythm guitar, Dennis Hromek on bass, and Biff Adam on drums. "Street Singer" peaked at number nine on the U.S. Billboard Hot Country Singles chart and peaked at number twenty four on the Bubbling Under Hot 100. It reached number-one on the Canadian RPM Country Tracks in June 1970.

== Personnel ==
The Strangers:

- Roy Nichols – lead guitar
- Norman Hamlet – steel guitar, dobro
- Bobby Wayne - rhythm guitar
- Dennis Hromek – bass
- Biff Adam – drums

with:

- Merle Haggard– vocals

== Chart performance ==
Chart (1970)	Peak position
US Hot Country Songs (Billboard)	9
US Bubbling Under Hot 100 Singles (Billboard)	24
Canadian RPM Country Tracks	1
