= The Land of Many Churches =

Live album by Merle Haggard and the Strangers
- Released: November 8, 1971
- Genre: Country, gospel
- Length: 1:09:45
- Label: Capitol
- Producer: Ken Nelson, George Richey

Merle Haggard and the Strangers chronology
Someday We'll Look Back (1971)	The Land of Many Churches (1971)	Let Me Tell You About a Song (1972)

The Land of Many Churches is the fifteenth studio album by Merle Haggard and the Strangers, released as a double album by Capitol Records in 1971.

== Background ==
The album collects four live performances: two are in churches proper—Big Creek Baptist Church and Assembly of God Tabernacle—one is at San Quentin's Garden Chapel inside the prison, and one at Nashville's Union Rescue Mission. The music offers a mix of country gospel and traditional hymns with preachers introducing some of the songs. Bonnie Owens and the Carter Family are also featured. The album reached number 15 on the Billboard country albums chart.

It was reissued on CD in 1997 by Razor & Tie.

== Reception ==
Professional ratings
Review scores
Source	Rating
AllMusic	4/5 stars

Al Campbell of AllMusic states, "To his credit, Haggard had a greater need to shine light on the music that influenced him, more so than the need to release material that guaranteed a surefire hit... Highly recommended to traditional country fans." Writing in 2013, Haggard biographer David Cantwell calls it "one of the gems of the country canon."

== Track listing ==
1. "Introduction/We'll Understand It Better By and By" (Charles Tindley) – 4:39
2. "Medley: Take My Hand, Precious Lord/Jesus Hold My Hand" (Thomas A. Dorsey, Albert E. Brumley) – 3:26
3. "Precious Memories" (Traditional) – 3:14
4. "History of Big Creek Baptist Church" – 2:40
5. "Turn Your Radio On" (Brumley) – 2:09
6. "If We Never Meet Again" (Brumley) – 2:58
7. "Closing Prayer/Just as I Am – 1:23
8. "Introduction & Opening Prayer – 2:09
9. "Amazing Grace" (John Newton) – 3:33
10. "Where Could I Go But to the Lord" (James B. Coats) – 2:25
11. "Medley: Old Time Religion/Pass Me Not/Sweet By and By" (S. Bennett, F. Crosby, W. Doane, Traditional, Joseph P. Webster) – 3:15
12. "The Old Rugged Cross" (George Bennard) – 4:03
13. "Closing Prayer – 1:00
14. "Introduction – 1:28
15. "Life's Railway to Heaven" (Charles Davis Tillman) – 2:58
16. "On the Jericho Road" (Don S. McCrossan) – 3:02
17. "Steal Away" (Red Foley) – 4:13
18. "I Saw the Light" (Hank Williams) – 2:47
19. "Introduction/Leaning on the Everlasting Arms" (Elisha A. Hoffman, Anthony Johnson Showalter) – 5:02
20. "Guide Me, Lord" (Johnny Gimble) – 2:50
21. "Family Bible" (Walt Breeland, Paul Buskirk, Claude Gray) – 3:38
22. "I'll Be List'ning" (Traditional) – 2:30
23. "Just a Closer Walk with Thee" (Traditional) – 3:19
24. "Closing Prayer" – 1:04

== Personnel ==
- Merle Haggard – vocals, guitar

The Strangers:

- Roy Nichols – lead guitar
- Norman Hamlet – steel guitar, dobro
- Bobby Wayne – rhythm guitar, harmony vocals
- Dennis Hromek – bass, background vocals
- Biff Adam – drums

with

- Tommy Collins – guitar
- Jody Payne – guitar
- Johnny Gimble – fiddle
- Bonnie Owens – harmony vocals

and

- Earl Ball – piano
- Billy Liebert – piano
- Jerry Smith – piano
- Carter Family – background singers

== Chart positions ==
Year	Chart	Position
1972	Billboard Country albums	15
