= The Fightin' Side of Me (album) =

Live album by Merle Haggard and the Strangers
- Released: July 6, 1970
- Recorded: February 14, 1970
- Venue: Civic Center Hall, Philadelphia, Pennsylvania, U.S.
- Genre: Country
- Label: Capitol
- Producer: Ken Nelson

Merle Haggard and the Strangers chronology
Okie from Muskogee (1969)	The Fightin' Side of Me (1970)	A Tribute to the Best Damn Fiddle Player in the World (or, My Salute to Bob Wills) (1970)

Singles from The Fightin' Side of Me
- 1. "The Fightin' Side of Me" Released: January 26, 1970

The Fightin' Side of Me is the second live album by Merle Haggard and the Strangers, released in 1970. The album was quickly released because of the success of Haggard's patriotic single "The Fightin' Side of Me".

== Background ==
The success of "Okie from Muskogee" brought Haggard's music to the attention of listeners and performers outside the country music field. The Byrds, for example, had already been performing his songs in concert, and counterculture legends the Grateful Dead began covering "Okie from Muskogee" in concert for the very same hippies that the song derides (Phil Ochs and the Beach Boys were among some of the other acts that played the song in concert). Whether these rock and rollers were simply amused by Haggard's song or genuinely impressed by his run of hits in the latter part of the decade, it was all made a moot point by the time he released the single "The Fightin' Side of Me" in 1970, a song that was so unapologetically right wing that it left no doubt as to where Haggard stood politically. It became his fourth consecutive #1 country hit and also made an appearance on the pop chart, but any ideas that Haggard was a closeted liberal sympathizer were irretrievably squashed. In the song, Haggard allows that he does not mind the counterculture "switchin' sides and standin' up for what they believe in" but resolutely declares, "If you don't love it, leave it!" In May 1970, Haggard explained his view of the counterculture to John Grissom of Rolling Stone, "I don't like their views on life, their filth, their visible self-disrespect, y'know. They don't give a shit what they look like or what they smell like... What do they have to offer humanity?"

Ironically, Haggard had wanted to follow "Okie from Muskogee" with "Irma Jackson," a song that dealt head-on with an interracial romance between a white man and an African-American woman. His producer Ken Nelson discouraged him from releasing it as a single. As Jonathan Bernstein recounts in his online Rolling Stone article "Merle Haggard Reluctantly Unveils 'The Fightin' Side of Me'", "Hoping to distance himself from the harshly right-wing image he had accrued in the wake of the hippie-bashing "Muskogee," Haggard wanted to take a different direction and release "Irma Jackson" as his next single... When the Bakersfield, California native brought the song to his record label, executives were reportedly appalled. In the wake of 'Okie,' Capitol Records was not interested in complicating Haggard's conservative, blue-collar image." After "The Fightin' Side of Me" was released instead, Haggard later commented to the Wall Street Journal, "People are narrow-minded. Down South they might have called me a nigger lover."

== Recording ==
The Fightin' Side of Me was recorded at the Civic Center Hall in Philadelphia on Valentine's Day 1970. The show also included Kitty Wells, Hank Snow, and Tommy Collins, although they are not included on this recording. Haggard's 1970 concert includes covers of songs by Jimmie Rodgers and Woody Guthrie. Haggard's then-wife Bonnie Owens also sings a couple of songs album includes a medley of impersonations that Haggard does of fellow country stars Marty Robbins, Hank Snow, Johnny Cash, and Buck Owens.

== Reception ==
Professional ratings
Review scores
Source	Rating
AllMusic	3.5/5 stars
Christgau's Record Guide	C+

AllMusic critic Stephen Thomas Erlewine stated in his review: "Like its predecessor, Okie from Muskogee, The Fightin' Side of Me was a rush-released live album designed to cash in on the success of his ultra-patriotic hit single of the same name... It's a fun record, and one that gives a better indication of what a typical Haggard concert was like in the early '70s, but it's ultimately a minor entry in his catalog." Music critic Robert Christgau wrote, "This is turning into a cartoon—once again a jingoistic anthem sells a live album."

== Track listing ==
1. "Introduction by Carlton Haney" – 1:15
2. "I Take a Lot of Pride in What I Am" (Merle Haggard) – 1:52
3. "Corrine, Corrina" (J. Mayo Williams, Bo Chatmon) – 2:24
4. "Every Fool Has a Rainbow" (Haggard) – 2:29
5. "T. B. Blues" (Jimmie Rodgers) – 2:12
6. "When Did Right Become Wrong" (Tommy Collins) – 2:44
7. "Philadelphia Lawyer" (Woody Guthrie) – 2:55
8. "Stealin' Corn" (Roy Nichols, Norm Hamlet) – 1:28
9. "Harold's Super Service" (Bobby Wayne) – 2:05
10. "Medley of Impersonations: Devil Woman, I'm Movin' On, Folsom Prison Blues, Jackson, Orange Blossom Special, Love's Gonna Live Here" – 5:02
11. "Today I Started Loving You Again" (Haggard) – 2:00
12. "Okie from Muskogee" (Merle Haggard, Eddie Burris) – 2:48
13. "The Fightin' Side of Me" (Haggard) – 2:52

== Personnel ==
- Merle Haggard – vocals, guitar

The Strangers:

- Roy Nichols – lead guitar
- Norman Hamlet – steel guitar, dobro
- Bobby Wayne – rhythm guitar, harmony vocals
- Dennis Hromek – bass, background vocals
- Biff Adam – drums

with

- Bonnie Owens – harmony vocals

and

- Chubby Wise – fiddle

== Chart positions ==
Year	Chart	Position
1970	Billboard Country albums	1
