= Strangers (Merle Haggard album) =

Studio album by Merle Haggard
- Released: September 27, 1965
- Recorded: 1963–1965
- Genre: Country
- Length: 27:50
- Label: Capitol
- Producer: Ken Nelson, Fuzzy Owen

Merle Haggard chronology
Strangers (1965)	Just Between the Two of Us (1966)

Singles from Strangers
- 1. "Sing a Sad Song" Released: September 1963; 2. "Sam Hill" Released: April 1964; 3. "(My Friends Are Gonna Be) Strangers" Released: November 1964; 4. "I'm Gonna Break Every Heart I Can" Released: June 1965

Strangers is the debut studio album by American country music artist Merle Haggard. It was released on September 27, 1965, by Capitol Records.

== Background ==
Haggard had already recorded several sides for Tally, a record label formed by cousins Lewis Talley and Fuzzy Owen, when he was approached by producer Ken Nelson to jump to Capitol. Initially Haggard refused, opting to remain loyal to Owen and Talley, but Tally Records did not have the resources to break Haggard, who was creating quite a buzz in California. In Daniel Cooper's essay for the 1994 retrospective Down Every Road, Nelson remembers, "So I called Fuzzy, and I said, 'Hey, come on, get down here and let's settle this thing. Because you're not gonna sell records. You don't have the facilities, you don't have the promotion department, you don't have anything.' So he came down, and we signed Merle, and I bought all of his masters. And that's how Merle came on the label." The deal meant Capitol obtained nearly two albums worth of material, including the recordings Haggard had made with Bonnie Owens. Fuzzy Owen became Haggard's manager and co-producer with Nelson at Capitol. The name of the album inspired his backup band's name The Strangers.

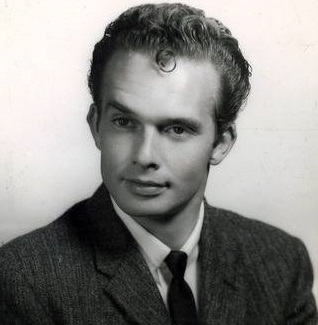
Haggard depicted on a publicity portrait for Tally Records

== Recording and composition ==
Haggard had recorded "Sing a Sad Song" for Tally, first hearing the Wynn Stewart composition when he played bass for Stewart in 1962. The song made it to number 19 on the Billboard country singles chart in 1963, but Haggard's first Top 10 hit was the Liz Anderson-penned "(My Friends Are Gonna Be) Strangers." In his 1981 autobiography Merle Haggard: Sing Me Back Home, Haggard recalls having been talked into visiting Anderson—a woman he didn't know—at her house to hear her sing some songs she had written. "If there was anything I didn't wanna do, it was sit around some danged woman's house and listen to her cute little songs. But I went anyway. She was a pleasant enough lady, pretty, with a nice smile, but I was all set to be bored to death, even more so when she got out a whole bunch of songs and went over to an old pump organ...There they were. My God, one hit right after another. There must have been four or five number one songs there..." Anderson also wrote "The Worst is Yet to Come" and would be responsible for Haggard's future hit "I'm a Lonesome Fugitive." Haggard wrote or co-wrote half the songs on the LP, as he had been developing his own skills as a songwriter under Owen's tutelage at the time. At Haggard's first Capitol recording session in April 1965, he cut "If I Had Left It Up to You" and "I'm Gonna Break Every Heart I Can." The Strangers album is composed of new Capitol recordings, his early singles, and a couple of Tally leftovers. "Sam Hill," for example, had peaked at number forty-five after its June 1964 release. The song, written by friend and mentor Tommy Collins, was not one of Haggard's favorites, with the singer recalling in his 1999 memoir My House of Memories, "I'm glad 'Sam Hill' wasn't a big hit. I didn't much like the song and had it been a giant hit I would have hated to have sung it for the next fifty years." Although Haggard came from the harder-edged Bakersfield Sound, five of the twelve songs are sweetened by strings, one of the hallmarks of the Nashville sound. In addition, a Marty Robbins influence is clearly evident in Haggard's singing on "I'd Trade All of My Tomorrows" and "You Don't Even Try."

== Critical reception ==
Professional ratings
Review scores
Source	Rating
AllMusic	4/5 stars

Strangers was a hit album, reaching number 9 on the Billboard country albums chart. In Merle Haggard: The Running Kind, Haggard biographer David Cantwell writes, "Haggard didn't come off as a particularly distinctive artist on Strangers, but his derivativeness was of a high and promising quality."

Critic Steven Thomas Erlewine of AllMusic calls it "an impressive debut," conceding that "there is some filler on Strangers, but that was the case for nearly every country album recorded in the '60s. What counts is the good stuff and the best songs on the record richly illustrate Haggard's talent and his potential."

== Track listing ==
No.	Title	Writer(s)	Length
1.	"(My Friends Are Gonna Be) Strangers"	Liz Anderson	2:29
2.	"Falling for You"	Ralph Mooney	2:18
3.	"Please Mr. D.J."	Merle Haggard	2:26
4.	"You Don't Have Far to Go"	Haggard, Red Simpson	2:31
5.	"Sing a Sad Song"	Wynn Stewart	2:35
6.	"Sam Hill"	Tommy Collins	2:28
7.	"I'm Gonna Break Every Heart I Can"	Haggard	2:00
8.	"You Don't Even Try"	Haggard, Fuzzy Owen	2:17
9.	"If I Had Left It Up to You"	Haggard	2:24
10.	"I'd Trade All of My Tomorrows (For Just One Yesterday)"	Jenny Carson	2:31
11.	"The Worst Is Yet to Come"	Anderson	2:41
12.	"Walking the Floor Over You"	Ernest Tubb	1:45

== Personnel ==
- Merle Haggard – vocals, guitar
- Roy Nichols – guitar
- Ralph Mooney – steel guitar
- George French, Jr. – piano
- Tommy Collins – guitar
- Wynn Stewart – guitar
- Gene Moles – guitar
- Phil Baugh – guitar
- Clifford Hills – fiddle
- Bobby Austin – bass
- Robert Morris – bass
- Helen Price – drums
- Henry Sharpe – drums

== Chart positions ==
Year	Chart	Position
1965	Billboard Country LPs	9
