= Pancho & Lefty (album) =

Studio album by Merle Haggard and Willie Nelson
- Released: January 1983
- Recorded: November 1982
- Studio: Pedernales Recording (Spicewood, Texas)
- Genre: Country
- Length: 35:35
- Label: Epic
- Producer: Merle Haggard, Willie Nelson, Chips Moman

Merle Haggard chronology
Goin' Home for Christmas (1982)	Pancho & Lefty (1983)	Heart to Heart (Merle Haggard and Leona Williams album) (1983)

Singles from Pancho & Lefty
- 1. "Pancho and Lefty" Released: April 30, 1983

Pancho & Lefty is a collaborative album by American outlaw country musicians Merle Haggard and Willie Nelson, released in 1983. Original vinyl copies from 1983 give the album's title as "Poncho & Lefty" on the cover, as well as on the inner sleeve and the record label; the album's title track is similarly rendered "Poncho & Lefty" on the cover, inner sleeve, and label. Later editions correct the title to the intended "Pancho & Lefty.” They are backed by Don Markham of The Strangers.

== Background ==
The title track was written by Texas songwriter Townes Van Zandt and was recorded towards the end of the recording sessions. The song tells the story of a Mexican bandit named Pancho and a more mysterious character, his associate Lefty, and implies that Pancho was killed after he was betrayed by Lefty, who was paid off by the Mexican federales. In the Van Zandt documentary Be Here To Love Me, Nelson recalls how the album with Haggard was nearly completed but he felt they didn't have "that blockbuster, you know, that one big song for a good single and a video, and my daughter Lana suggested that we listen to 'Pancho and Lefty'. I had never heard it and Merle had never heard it." Lana Nelson returned with a copy of the song and Nelson cut it immediately with his band in the middle of the night but had to retrieve a sleeping Haggard, who had retired to his bus hours earlier, to record his vocal part. Van Zandt appears in the video for the song playing one of the Mexican federales. "It was real nice they invited me," Van Zandt told Aretha Sills in 1994. The song topped the Billboard country music singles chart. A second single, the sombre "Reasons to Quit," was another Top 10 hit.

Haggard and Nelson would record another album together, Seashores of Old Mexico, in 1987.

== Reception ==
Professional ratings
Review scores
Source	Rating
AllMusic	4/5 stars
Robert Christgau	B+

Martin Monkman of AllMusic calls the album "an album by two legends that lives up to, and at one point exceeds, expectations... one gets the sense that this is a collaboration in every sense." Music critic Robert Christgau wrote "Haggard hasn't sung with so much care in years, which is obviously Nelson's doing..."

== Track listing ==
No.	Title	Writer(s)	Lead Vocal	Length
1.	"Pancho and Lefty"	Townes van Zandt	Willie with Merle on the last verse	4:49
2.	"It's My Lazy Day"	Smiley Burnette		2:50
3.	"My Mary"	Stuart Hamblen, Jimmie Davis	Merle Haggard	3:17
4.	"Half a Man"	Willie Nelson	Merle on first and third verse with Willie on second	4:13
5.	"Reasons to Quit"	Merle Haggard		3:32
6.	"No Reason to Quit"	Dean Holloway	Merle Haggard	3:15
7.	"Still Water Runs the Deepest"	Jesse Ashlock	Willie Nelson	2:46
8.	"My Life's Been a Pleasure (I Still Love You as I Did in Yesterday)"	Jesse Ashlock		3:25
9.	"All the Soft Places to Fall"	Leona Williams		3:34
10.	"Opportunity to Cry"	Willie Nelson	Willie Nelson	4:01

2003 Bonus Tracks
No.	Title	Writer(s)	Lead Vocal	Length
11.	"Half a Man" (alternate version)	Willie Nelson	Willie	3:35
12.	"My Own Peculiar Way"	Willie Nelson	Willie	2:59
Total length:				42:16

== Personnel ==
- Merle Haggard– vocals, guitar
- Willie Nelson – vocals, guitar
- Lewis Talley – guitar
- Grady Martin – guitar
- Don Markham – saxophone, trumpet
- Johnny Gimble – fiddle, mandolin
- Mickey Raphael – harmonica
- Reggie Young – guitar
- Chips Moman – guitar
- Johnny Christopher – guitar
- Bobby Emmons – keyboards
- Bobby Wood – keyboards
- Mike Leech – bass
- Gene Chrisman – drums

== Chart performance ==
=== Album ===
Chart (1983)	Peak position
U.S. Billboard Top Country Albums	1
U.S. Billboard 200	37

=== Singles ===
Year	Single	Peak chart positions		
Year	Single	US Country	US AC	CAN Country
1983	"Reasons to Quit"	6	—	7
1983	"Pancho and Lefty"	1	21	1
