= Blue Jungle =

Studio album by Merle Haggard
- Released: 1990
- Genre: Country
- Length: 29:16
- Label: Curb
- Producer: Merle Haggard, Grady Martin, Mark Yeary

Merle Haggard chronology
5:01 Blues (1989)	Blue Jungle (1990)	1994 (1994)

Singles from Blue Jungle
- 1. "When It Rains It Pours" Released: September 1990; 2. "Blue Jungle" Released: October 1990; 3. "A Bar in Bakersfield" Released: January 1991

Blue Jungle is the forty-seventh studio album by American recording artist Merle Haggard, with backing by his band, The Strangers, released in 1990. The album peaked at number 47 on the Billboard country albums chart. It was co-produced by Mark Yeary, the honky tonk piano player of Merle Haggard's band, 13 consecutive years awarded the ACM Band of the Year, The Strangers.

== Background ==
Blue Jungle marked Haggard's first album with Curb after his run on Epic Records ended with his 1989 album 5:01 Blues. Two songs, "My Home Is in the Street" (co-written with wife Teresa) and "Under the Bridge", deal with the topic of homelessness. "Driftwood" is updated from the version that appeared on Haggard's 1979 MCA LP Serving 190 Proof.

== Reception ==
Professional ratings
Review scores
Source	Rating
Allmusic	3/5 stars

The AllMusic review states: "...his songwriting expertise still remained intact...Blue Jungle is a glimpse of a performer with nothing to lose, away from the spotlight yet very much engaged with his material. According to Hank Cochran, legendary songwriter and close friend of Haggard, "Cody's song, 'When It Rains It Pours' was the jewel of the album."

== Track listing ==
1. "Blue Jungle" (Merle Haggard, Freddy Powers) – 2:27
2. "Sometimes I Dream" (Haggard) – 2:57
3. "My Home Is in the Street" (Haggard, Teresa Lane Haggard) – 2:27
4. "When It Rains It Pours" (John Cody Carter) – 3:27
5. "Me and Crippled Soldiers" (Haggard, Bonnie Owens) – 3:12
6. "Under the Bridge" (Haggard) – 2:56
7. "Lucky Old Colorado" (Red Simpson) – 3:10
8. "Driftwood" (Haggard) – 2:47
9. "Never No Mo' Blues" (Elsie McWilliams, Jimmie Rodgers) – 3:01
10. "A Bar in Bakersfield" (Haggard, Powers) – 2:52

== Personnel ==
- Merle Haggard – vocals, guitar

The Strangers:

- Norm Hamlet – Dobro, steel guitar
- Clint Strong – acoustic guitar, electric guitar
- Bobby Wayne – acoustic guitar
- Mark Yeary – keyboards, piano
- Biff Adam – drums, percussion
- Don Markham – saxophone, trumpet
- Gary Church – cornet, trombone

with:

- Grady Martin – electric guitar
- Bonnie Owens – background vocals

and:

- Willie Savage – electric guitar
- Steve Grahn – acoustic guitar
- Gary Tackett – acoustic guitar
- Reggie Brown – bass guitar
- Mike Leech – bass guitar
- Joe Reed – bass guitar
- Eric Griffin – percussion
- Steve Van Stralen – percussion
- Steve Herman – harmonica
