= I'm a Lonesome Fugitive =

Studio album by Merle Haggard and the Strangers
- Released: March 4, 1967
- Recorded: August and November 1966
- Studio: Capitol (Hollywood)
- Genre: Country
- Length: 31:02
- Label: Capitol
- Producer: Ken Nelson

Merle Haggard and the Strangers chronology
Swinging Doors and the Bottle Let Me Down (1966)	I'm a Lonesome Fugitive (1967)	Branded Man (1967)

Singles from I'm a Lonesome Fugitive
- 1. "I'm a Lonesome Fugitive" Released: December 6, 1966

I'm a Lonesome Fugitive is the third studio album by Merle Haggard and the Strangers released on Capitol Records in 1967.

== Recording and composition ==
The song "I'm a Lonesome Fugitive" brought Haggard country stardom. Although it sounds autobiographical (Haggard had done time at San Quentin), David Cantwell states in his book The Running Kind that it was actually written by Liz Anderson and her husband Casey while driving cross country and was inspired by the popular television show The Fugitive starring David Janssen as Richard Kimble. Haggard felt a connection to the song immediately and when it was released it became his first number one country hit. When Anderson played the song for Haggard, she was unaware about his prison stretch. "I guess I didn't realize how much the experience at San Quentin did to him, 'cause he never talked about it all that much," Bonnie Owens, Haggard's backup singer, and then-wife, is quoted in the liner notes to the 1994 retrospective, Down Every Road. "I could tell he was in a dark mood...and I said, 'Is everything okay?' And he said, 'I'm really scared.' And I said, 'Why?' And he said, 'Cause I'm afraid someday I'm gonna be out there...and there's gonna be some convict...some prisoner that was in there the same time I was in, stand up—and they're gonna be about the third row down—and say, 'What do you think you're doing, 45200?'" Haggard would address the issue on his next album, Branded Man.

In 1996, I'm a Lonesome Fugitive was reissued by BGO Records along with Mama Tried.

== Reception ==
Professional ratings
Review scores
Source	Rating
AllMusic	4.5/5 stars

I'm a Lonesome Fugitive was released on March 4, 1967, and rose to number 3 on the Billboard country albums chart and made it to number 165 on the pop charts. As with his previous album Swinging Doors, Haggard wrote nearly all the songs himself. As David Cantwell observed in 2013, most of the songs find Haggard in some sort of trap, citing the prison song "Life in Prison" and "House of Memories" ("My house is a prison...") and describes the album as "hurtling and out of control even when standing still. Merle can do nothing but sit and wait for phone calls that never come...It's a fantastic album, start to end..." George Bedard of AllMusic praises Haggard's cover of the Jimmie Rodgers classic "Rough and Rowdy Ways," insisting that Haggard "could evoke the Ghosts of Country Past in an absolutely convincing way without nostalgia or imitation."

== Track listing ==
All songs by Merle Haggard unless otherwise noted.

No.	Title	Writer(s)	Length
1.	"I'm a Lonesome Fugitive"	Liz Anderson, Casey Anderson	2:56
2.	"All of Me Belongs to You"		2:40
3.	"House of Memories"		2:47
4.	"Life in Prison"	Jelly Sanders, Haggard	3:02
5.	"Whatever Happened to Me"		2:57
6.	"Drink Up and Be Somebody"		2:30
7.	"Someone Told My Story"		2:32
8.	"If You Want to Be My Woman"		2:16
9.	"Mary's Mine"	Jerry Ward	2:56
10.	"Skid Row"		1:57
11.	"My Rough and Rowdy Ways"	Jimmie Rodgers	2:23
12.	"Mixed Up Mess of a Heart"	Tommy Collins, Haggard	2:06

== Personnel ==
- Merle Haggard – vocals, guitar

The Strangers:

- Roy Nichols – guitar
- Ralph Mooney – steel guitar
- George French – piano
- Jerry Ward – bass
- Eddie Burris – drums

with

- Lewis Talley – guitar
- Billy Mize – guitar
- Bonnie Owens – harmony vocals

and

- James Burton – guitar, dobro
- Glen Campbell – guitar
- Glen D. Hardin – piano
- Jim Gordon – drums

== Chart positions ==
Chart (1967)	Peak position
Billboard Country Albums	3
Billboard Pop Albums	165
