= Swinging Doors and the Bottle Let Me Down =

Studio album by Merle Haggard and the Strangers
- Released: October 3, 1966
- Recorded: August and December 1965, June and August 1966
- Studio: Capitol (Hollywood)
- Genre: Country
- Length: 29:51
- Label: Capitol
- Producer: Ken Nelson, Fuzzy Owen

Merle Haggard and the Strangers chronology
Just Between the Two of Us (1966)	Swinging Doors and the Bottle Let Me Down (1966)	I'm a Lonesome Fugitive (1967)

Singles from Swinging Doors
- 1. "Shade Tree (Fix-It Man)" Released: October 1965; 2. "Swinging Doors" Released: February 28, 1966; 3. "The Bottle Let Me Down" Released: August 1, 1966

Swinging Doors and the Bottle Let Me Down is the second studio album by American country music singer Merle Haggard and the Strangers, released in 1966 on Capitol Records. It is sometimes called Swinging Doors and has also been released with two fewer songs as High on a Hilltop.

== Recording and composition ==
In April 1966, Haggard traveled to Nashville to record for the first time with disappointing results. "Seemed like there was a period where I was paddlin' around in the water tryin' to do something and it just wouldn't work," Haggard recalls in the American Masters episode about his life, "and a lot of hair pullin' tryin' to figure out what I was doing wrong and what I could do right in order to make it work. And all of a sudden it just started workin'." Focusing on the sharper edges that had made "Swinging Doors" a Top 5 hit, Haggard returned to the studio in late June 1966 and cut "The Bottle Let Me Down", which would peak at number 3, his biggest hit up to that point.

Haggard's new recordings largely centered on Roy Nichols's Telecaster, Ralph Mooney's steel guitar, and the harmony vocals provided by Bonnie Owens. As Owens recalled to Daniel Cooper in the liner notes to the Haggard box set Down Every Road, "The only person that either of us knew that had any success at all—that we knew personally—was Buck Owens. And so...we had to kind of pattern most everything from what Buck would talk to us about... Certain things, like...'The Bottle Let Me Down.' 'Tonight the bottle'—and he says 'let me down.' We were accenting what he's saying by himself... The only reason for harmony is to accent... Buck always taught me that." Haggard and producer Ken Nelson also began employing session players like James Burton and Glen Campbell (who both played on "The Bottle Let Me Down") to help flesh out the tunes. During a marathon session on August 1, Haggard recorded "I'll Look Over You" and the Tommy Collins composition "High on a Hilltop," which had been inspired by the foul language used by the waitresses at the Blackboard Cafe, a club where both Collins and Haggard had played. Liz Anderson, who had composed Haggard's first Top 10 hit "(My Friends Are Gonna Be) Strangers," penned "This Town's Not Big Enough" but the majority of the songs were written by Haggard, who was becoming a prolific songwriter.

== Critical reception ==
Professional ratings
Review scores
Source	Rating
AllMusic	5/5 stars
Pitchfork Media	8.8/10

Swinging Doors would top the Billboard country albums chart. AllMusic critic Stephen Thomas Erlewine wrote in his review: "In addition to the two masterpieces from which the album took its name, the record included a terrific version of Tommy Collins' "High On A Hilltop," and plus excellent songs like "The Girl Turned Ripe," "If I Could Be Him," and "Someone Else You've Known." There's a few weak tracks, but Haggard and his band are in fine form, making the filler enjoyable."

== Track listing ==
All songs by Merle Haggard unless otherwise noted.

No.	Title	Writer(s)	Length
1.	"Swinging Doors"		2:51
2.	"If I Could Be Him"		2:51
3.	"The Longer You Wait"		2:18
4.	"I'll Look Over You"		2:07
5.	"I Can't Stand Me"		2:16
6.	"The Girl Turned Ripe"		2:17
7.	"The Bottle Let Me Down"		2:45
8.	"No More You and Me"		2:18
9.	"Somebody Else You've Known"		2:07
10.	"High on a Hilltop"	Tommy Collins	2:58
11.	"This Town's Not Big Enough"	Liz Anderson, Donna Austin	2:43
12.	"Shade Tree (Fix-It Man)"		2:20

== Personnel ==
- Merle Haggard – vocals, guitar

The Strangers:

- Roy Nichols – guitar
- Ralph Mooney – steel guitar
- George French – piano
- Jerry Ward – bass
- Eddie Burris – drums

with

- Lewis Talley – guitar
- Billy Mize – harmony vocals
- Bonnie Owens – harmony vocals

and

- James Burton – guitar, dobro
- Glen Campbell – guitar
- Phil Baugh – guitar
- Jack Collier – guitar
- Glen D. Hardin – piano
- Bob Morris – bass
- Bert Dodson – bass
- Jim Gordon – drums
- Helen "Peaches" Price – drums

== Chart positions ==
Chart (1966)	Peak position
Billboard Country LPs	1
