= Goin' Home for Christmas =

Studio album by Merle Haggard
- Released: November 1982
- Genre: Country, Christmas
- Length: 28:55
- Label: Epic
- Producer: Merle Haggard and Roy Nichols

Merle Haggard chronology
Going Where the Lonely Go (1982)	Goin' Home for Christmas (1982)	Pancho & Lefty (1983)

Goin' Home for Christmas is the 36th studio album by American country singer Merle Haggard backed by The Strangers, released in 1982. A Christmas album, it reached Number 41 on the Billboard Country album chart. It was re-issued on Epic in 1984 with a completely different sleeve. Subsequent re-issues have reverted to variations of the original sleeve, but with a bonus track, "White Christmas" added. This extra track was recorded in 1986 and released in 1988 on the various artist collection "Nashville's Greatest Christmas Hits" (Columbia CK 44412). It was co-produced by Roy Nichols, lead guitarist of The Strangers.

== Critical reception ==
Professional ratings
Review scores
Source	Rating
Allmusic	2/5 stars

The AllMusic review states: "Merle Haggard's contribution to the holiday season is a generally festive affair... Mostly though, Haggard is an unexpectedly sensitive interpreter of these seasonal favorites."

== Track listing ==
All songs by Merle Haggard unless otherwise noted:

1. "Goin' Home for Christmas" – 2:28
2. "Grandma's Homemade Christmas Card" – 2:17
3. "Santa Claus Is Coming to Town" (J. Fred Coots, Haven Gillespie) – 2:14
4. "Santa Claus and Popcorn" – 2:32
5. "Daddy Won't Be Home Again for Christmas" – 3:23
6. "If We Make It Through December" – 2:39
7. "Bobby Wants a Puppy Dog for Christmas" – 2:09
8. "Rudolph the Red-Nosed Reindeer" (Johnny Marks) – 2:47
9. "Blue Christmas" (Billy Hayes, Jay W. Johnson) – 2:08
10. "Lonely Night" (M. L. Butler, Freddy Powers) – 2:53

== Personnel ==
- Merle Haggard – vocals, guitar
- Leona Williams Haggard
- Jimmy Capps
- Hal Rugg
- Henry Strzelcki
- Steve Chapman
- Clay Caire
- Farrell Morris
- Mark Casstevens
- Ron Oates
- Curtis Young
- Donna Sheridon
- Doug Clements
- Louis Nunley

== Chart performance ==
Chart (1982)	Peak position
U.S. Billboard Top Country Albums	41
