= 1994 (Merle Haggard album) =

Studio album by Merle Haggard
- Released: March 22, 1994
- Recorded: 1993–1994
- Studio: Eleven-Eleven Sound Studios, Loud Recording Studios, Mesa Recording Studios, Nashville, TN
- Genre: Country
- Length: 34:24
- Label: Curb
- Producer: James Stroud

Merle Haggard chronology
Blue Jungle (1990)	1994 (1994)	1996 (1996)

Singles from 1994
- 1. "In My Next Life" Released: February 7, 1994

1994 is the forty-eighth studio album by American country singer Merle Haggard, released in 1994.

== Background ==
Although Haggard's profile remained high in 1994, having been the subject of two tribute albums (Mama's Hungry Eyes: A Tribute to Merle Haggard and Tulare Dust), 1994 was a commercial disappointment, peaking at number 60 on the Billboard country albums chart. It had been four years since Haggard's previous album Blue Jungle, and in his Haggard biography The Running Kind, David Cantwell writes that Haggard, "took to bitching in interviews that Curb was happy enough to use his name for bait, luring future stars like Tim McGraw to the label, but it wouldn't release his music." The album includes a remake of his 1977 hit "Ramblin' Fever."

== Reception ==
Professional ratings
Review scores
Source	Rating
Allmusic	3/5 stars

Dan Cooper of AllMusic calls 1994 Haggard's strongest album since Big City. Biographer David Cantwell observed in 2013, "When it finally showed up, 1994 improved considerably on Blue Jungle."

== Track listing ==
1. "I Am an Island" (Max D. Barnes) – 3:34
2. "In My Next Life" (Barnes) – 3:48
3. "Way Back in the Mountains" (Merle Haggard, Barnes) – 3:09
4. "What's New in New York City" (Haggard) – 2:47
5. "Set My Chickens Free" (Haggard, Richard Smith) – 2:18 (Note: In 1969, the words from Gilbert Shelton's strip called Set My Chickens Free, published in issue 1 of the Bijou Funnies comic, were set to music by The Hub City Movers as The Chicken Song (rereleased in 1983 as Set Your Chickens Free). In his 1975 album Grasshopper (and 1976 single Cosmic Joke), David Carradine used the words in Chicken Song.)
6. "Chores" (Haggard, Barnes, Billy Davis, Theresa Lane) – 3:06
7. "Valentine" (Willie Nelson) – 3:09
8. "Solid as a Rock" (Haggard, Barnes) – 3:11
9. "Bye, Bye, Travelin' Blues" (Haggard, Dean Holloway) – 2:56
10. "Troubadour" (Haggard) – 2:28
11. "Ramblin' Fever" (Haggard) – 3:58

== Personnel ==
- Merle Haggard – vocals, guitar
- Norm Hamlet – steel guitar
- Biff Adams – drums
- Don Markham – trumpet, saxophone
- Larry Byrom – guitar
- Glen Duncan – fiddle
- Sonny Garrish – dobro, steel guitar
- Owen Hale – drums
- Dann Huff – guitar
- Abe Manuel, Jr. – guitar
- Joe Manuel – guitar
- Hilton Reed – guitar
- Leland Sklar – bass
- Gary W. Smith – piano
- Joe Spivey – fiddle
- Curtis Wright – background vocals
- Curtis Young – background vocals

Production notes:

- James Stroud – producer
- Hank Williams – mastering
- Julian King – engineer
- Steve Ledet – assistant engineer
- Rodney Good – assistant engineer
- Mark Hagen – assistant engineer
- Lynn Peterzell – engineer, mixing
- Doug Rich – production assistant

== Chart positions ==
Chart (1994)	Peak position
Billboard Country albums	60
