= Just Between the Two of Us =

Studio album by Bonnie Owens and Merle Haggard with the Strangers
- Released: 1966
- Genre: Country
- Length: 29:20
- Label: Capitol
- Producer: Ken Nelson, Fuzzy Owen

Merle Haggard chronology
Strangers (1965)	Just Between the Two of Us (1966)	Swinging Doors and the Bottle Let Me Down (1966)

Singles from Just Between the Two of Us
- 1. "Just Between the Two of Us" Released: July 1964

Just Between the Two of Us is a duet album by country singers Bonnie Owens and Merle Haggard with the Strangers. It was released in 1966 by Capitol Records.

== Reception ==
Professional ratings
Review scores
Source	Rating
Allmusic	3/5 stars

Just Between the Two of Us hit number 4 on the country albums chart. In a retrospective review by Mark Deming for AllMusic, Deming wrote that the album is for "Haggard completists" and notes, "while Bonnie Owens was a good honky tonk singer, she was hardly a great one like Haggard, who seems to be holding himself back a bit musically as he defers to his spouse."

== Track listing ==
1. "Just Between the Two of Us" (Liz Anderson) – 2:46
2. "A House Without Love is Not a Home" (Hank Williams) – 2:18
3. "Slowly But Surely" (Fuzzy Owen) – 2:23
4. "Our Hearts Are Holding Hands" (Bill Anderson) – 2:24
5. "I Wanta Live Again" (Fuzzy Owen) – 2:08
6. "Forever and Ever" (Buck Owens) – 2:07
7. "That Makes Two of Us" (L. Anderson) – 2:05
8. "I'll Take a Chance on Loving You" (Owens) – 2:47
9. "Stranger in My Arms" (Wallace Lewis, Owen) – 2:46
10. "Too Used to Being with You" (Don Carter, Jack Rhodes) – 2:03
11. "So Much for Me, So Much for You" – 3:00
12. "Wait a Little Longer, Please Jesus" (Chester Smith) – 2:35

== Personnel ==
- Merle Haggard – vocals, guitar
- Bonnie Owens – vocals

The Strangers:

- Roy Nichols – guitar
- Ralph Mooney – steel guitar
- George French – piano
- Jerry Ward – bass
- Eddie Burris – drums

== Chart positions ==
Chart (1966)	Peak position
Billboard Country LPs	4
