= The Fugitive (song) =

Single by Merle Haggard and The Strangers

from the album I'm a Lonesome Fugitive
- B-side: "Someone Told My Story"
- Released: December 12, 1966
- Genre: Country
- Length: 2:56
- Label: Capitol
- Songwriter(s): Liz Anderson; Casey Anderson
- Producer(s): Ken Nelson

Merle Haggard and The Strangers singles chronology
"The Bottle Let Me Down" (1966)	"The Fugitive" (1966)	"I Threw Away the Rose" (1967)

"The Fugitive" (later titled "I'm a Lonesome Fugitive" on the album) is a song recorded by American country music artist Merle Haggard and The Strangers, written by Liz Anderson and Casey Anderson (parents of country music singer Lynn Anderson). It was released in December 1966 as the first single and title track from the album I'm a Lonesome Fugitive. The song was Haggard and The Strangers' first number one hit on the U.S. country singles chart, spending one week at number one and fifteen weeks on the chart. The B-side, "Someone Told My Story", peaked at number 32 on the country chart.

== Content ==
Although not written by Haggard, the song became one of the most closely associated with the early part of his career, as it drew upon his then still-relatively recent prison term for burglary. Here, Haggard fills the shoes of an escaped convict, trying to live life on the run from the authorities. As a fugitive, he knows that trying to settle down or start a relationship are too risky—either his new friends (or a new girlfriend) would tip off the authorities or would slow him down as the authorities catch up—and is resigned to living a lonely life on the road as a "rolling stone" ("Down every road, there's always one more city/I'm on the run, the highway is my home").

== Chart performance ==
Chart (1966–1967)	Peak position
US Hot Country Songs (Billboard)	1
