= Swinging Doors (song) =

Single by Merle Haggard and the Strangers

from the album Swinging Doors
- B-side: "The Girl Turned Ripe"
- Released: February 28, 1966
- Studio: Capitol (Hollywood, California)
- Genre: Country
- Length: 2:51
- Label: Capitol
- Songwriter(s): Merle Haggard
- Producer(s): Ken Nelson; Fuzzy Owen

Merle Haggard and the Strangers singles chronology
"I'm Gonna Break Every Heart I Can" (1965)	"Swinging Doors" (1966)	"The Bottle Let Me Down" (1966)

"Swinging Doors" is a song written and recorded by American country music artist Merle Haggard and the Strangers. It was released in February 1966 as the first single and title track from the album Swinging Doors. The song peaked at number five on the U.S. Billboard Hot Country Singles.

== Content ==
The narrator has been dumped by his woman and tells her that he has what he needs.

== Chart performance ==
Chart (1966)	Peak position
US Hot Country Songs (Billboard)	5

== Cover versions ==
- Wanda Jackson covered this song on her 1968 album Cream of the Crop.
- Mickey Gilley released this song in 1974 as a B-side to his number 1 hit I Overlooked an Orchid.
- Jerry Lee Lewis
- Johnny Rebel
- Del Reeves's version was released in 1981, peaking at number 67 in the country charts.
- Ray Price
- Faron Young
- Johnny Paycheck covered "Swinging Doors" in July 1966.
- Willie Nelson and Merle Haggard on their duet album Django & Jimmie.
- Terri Clark on her 2012 album Classic.
- Buck Owens
- George Jones
- Mark Chesnutt
- Agent 51
