= The Bottle Let Me Down =

1966 single by Merle Haggard

Single by Merle Haggard and The Strangers

from the album Swinging Doors
- B-side: "The Longer You Wait"
- Released: August 1, 1966
- Studio: Capitol (Hollywood, California)
- Genre: Country
- Length: 2:45
- Label: Capitol
- Songwriter(s): Merle Haggard
- Producer(s): Ken Nelson; Fuzzy Owen

Merle Haggard and The Strangers singles chronology
"Swinging Doors" (1966)	"The Bottle Let Me Down" (1966)	"The Fugitive" (1966)

"The Bottle Let Me Down" is a song written and recorded by American country music artist Merle Haggard and The Strangers. It was released in August 1966 as the second single from the album Swinging Doors. The song peaked at number three on the U.S. Billboard Hot Country Singles.

== Content ==
The song is about a man who could no longer find solace from binge drinking to relieve his grief over a lost love.

== Chart performance ==
Chart (1966)	Peak position
US Hot Country Songs (Billboard)	3

== Porter Wagoner version ==
"The Bottle Let Me Down"

Single by Porter Wagoner

from the album The Bottom of the Bottle
- B-side: "One Dime For Wine"
- Genre: Country
- Length: 2:03
- Label: RCA Victor
- Songwriter(s): Merle Haggard
- Producer(s): Bob Ferguson
