= The Strangers (American band) =

American country band

- Roy Nichols, lead guitarist of the Strangers.

Background information
- Origin: Bakersfield, California
- Genres: Country; Western; Western swing; Bakersfield sound
- Years active: 1966–2016
- Labels: Capitol; MCA
- Past members: Merle Haggard; Biff Adam; Paul Anastasio; Johnny Barber; Jimmy Belken; Eddie Burris; James Burton; Glen Campbell; Renato Caranto; Jim Christie; Gary Church; Doug Colosio; Eddie Curtis; Iris DeMent; Terry Domingue; Floyd Domino; Wayne Durham; George French; Johnny Gimble; Ben Haggard; Dana Haggard; Noel Haggard; Theresa Haggard; Norman Hamlet; Dennis Hromek; Sidney Hunter; Jeff Ingraham; Scott Joss; Red Lane; Abe Manuel; Joe Manuel; Don Markham; Randy Mason; Will McGregor; Johnny Meeks; Eugene Moles; Ralph Mooney; Tiny Moore; Marcia Nichols; Roy Nichols; Fuzzy Owen; Bonnie Owens; Gene Price; Taras Prodaniuk; Joe Reed; Ronnie Reno; Sheril Rodgers; Eldon Shamblin; Clint Strong; Gordon Terry; Jimmy Tittle; Kenny Vernon; Redd Volkaert; Jerry Ward; Bobby Wayne; Mark Yeary

The Strangers were an American country band that formed in 1966 in Bakersfield, California. They mainly served as the backup band for singer-songwriter Merle Haggard, who named them after his first hit single "(My Friends Are Gonna Be) Strangers". In addition to serving as his backing band, members of the Strangers also produced many of Haggard's records, sang lead vocals on select tracks, and co-wrote many of Haggard's songs with him, including the No. 1 singles, "Okie From Muskogee" and "I Always Get Lucky with You". There were also occasions where they would perform in lieu of Haggard if he could not make a show.

From 1969 to 1973, they issued several records independent of Haggard, released on Capitol Records, and even had their own Top 10 hit single called "Street Singer" on the Billboard Hot Country Songs Chart. Three members of the Strangers would go on to be inducted into the Rock and Roll Hall of Fame. Between 1969 and 1987, the Strangers were voted Band of the Year by the Academy of Country Music eight times—more than any other group in history.

== History ==
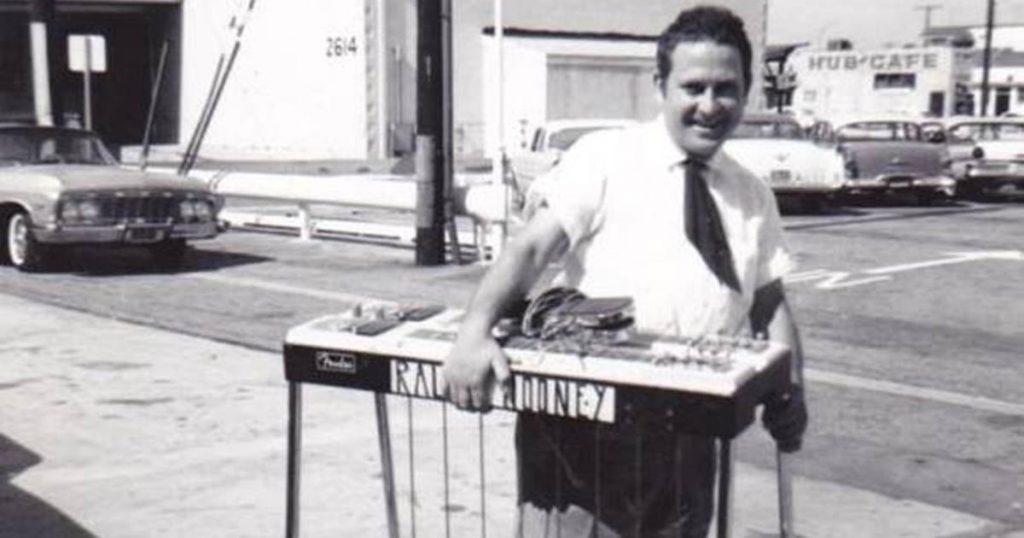
Ralph Mooney, original steel guitarist for the Strangers.

=== 1960s ===
Lead guitarist Roy Nichols had previously played with the Maddox Brothers and Rose, Lefty Frizzell, Wynn Stewart, and Johnny Cash before playing with the Strangers from 1965 until 1987, when health problems forced him into retirement. Duncan, Oklahoma-born steel guitarist Ralph Mooney (September 16, 1928 - March 20, 2011) had previously played with Wynn Stewart and written the song "Crazy Arms", and after leaving the Strangers recorded a duo album with James Burton and then joined Waylon Jennings band.

Norm Hamlet joined the Strangers on steel guitar in 1967 and, shortly afterward, became its bandleader. Howard "Jerry Ward" Lowe was the Strangers original bass player and George French (March 6, 1926 - August 14, 1992) played the piano. But when Ward left, Willard "Gene" Price (February 27, 1944 - August 13, 2013) from Shamrock, Texas, replaced him on bass just in time for the Okie from Muskogee album in 1969, on which he also sang lead vocals. Tulsa, Oklahoma-born Roy "Eddie" Burris (October 27, 1931 - April 19, 2011), the drummer for the Strangers, co-wrote the title track "Okie From Muskogee" with Merle Haggard.

=== 1970s ===
Clair "Biff" Adam replaced Burris as the Strangers drummer in 1970 and also served as Merle's publicist and bus driver. On the album, The Fightin' Side of Me, the Strangers added rhythm guitarist Robert "Bobby Wayne" Edrington (December 11, 1941 - September 21, 2009) from Oklahoma City, Oklahoma, and they got their own showcase on the instrumental "Stealin’ Corn". A second rhythm guitarist, Marcia "Nichols" Ashcraft (May 23, 1950 - October 1976), also joined the band

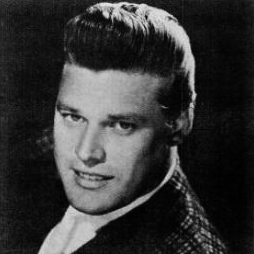
Gordon Terry, fiddle player for the Strangers.

After Bobby Wayne and Marcia Nichols left, Ronnie Reno of Reno and Smiley and the Osborne Brothers joined the Strangers on rhythm guitar, and he also produced Merle's duo album with Mac Wiseman as well as Merle's The Bluegrass Sessions. Ronnie would also sing lead vocals on albums like Merle Haggard Presents His 30th Album. Johnny Meeks, previously a member of Gene Vincent and the Blue Caps, the Champs, and Michael Nesmith and the Second National Band, played bass with the Strangers in the early 1970s and later got inducted into the Rock and Roll Hall of Fame. After Meeks left, Jimmy Tittle played bass with the band. After leaving the Strangers, Tittle would go on to play with his father-in-law Johnny Cash. He was replaced by bassist Sherman "Wayne" Durham.

Saxophonist Don Markham, who had played with Sly & the Family Stone, the Ventures, the Bakersfield Brass, and Johnny Paycheck played with the Strangers from 1974 to 2013. In the mid-1970s, former Bob Wills and the Texas Playboys guitarist Estel "Eldon" Shamblin was invited to join the Strangers. After retiring from the Strangers, Eldon Shamblin would continue to perform with them whenever they played in Tulsa. Electric mandolinist Billie "Tiny" Moore also joined the Strangers during the 1970s. Like Eldon Shamblin, Tiny Moore had also been a member of Bob Wills and the Texas Playboys.

In the late 1970s Decatur, Gordon Terry joined the Strangers on fiddle. Terry had previously played with Bill Monroe, Faron Young, and Johnny Cash.

=== 1980s ===
After Gordon Terry left the band, fiddler Jimmy Belken joined. Belken had previously played with Bob Wills and the Texas Playboys as well as Mel Tillis and the Statesiders. In addition to serving as Strangers bassist, Dennis Hromek would also sing some lead vocals at Strangers shows. When Hromek left Bobby Wayne returned to the Strangers, this time playing bass.

Other noteworthy members of the band included trumpet player Gary Church and keyboardist Mark Yeary, who also served as Merle's co-producer on his records. Clint Strong, who had studied under Stan Kenton, joined the Strangers on lead guitar during the mid-1980s. Sheril Rodgers, co-wrote with Merle and singer/songwriter Freddy Powers. Sheril toured with the Strangers as backup singer from 1983 to 1984 and co-wrote "Let's Chase Each Other Around the Room Tonight".

== Discography ==
=== Albums credited to the Strangers ===
Released	Album	US Country	Label
February 23, 1969	The Instrumental Sounds of Merle Haggard's Strangers	36	Capitol Records
April 6, 1970	Introducing My Friends the Strangers	34	Capitol Records
October 5, 1970	Getting to Know Merle Haggard's Strangers	44	Capitol Records
June 21, 1971	Honky Tonkin'	34	Capitol Records
May 1, 1973	Totally Instrumental...With One Exception	23	Capitol Records

=== Singles credited to the Strangers ===
Released	Single	Chart positions			Album
Released	Single	US Country	CAN Country	Bubbling Under Hot 100	Album
April 18, 1970	"Street Singer"	9	1	24	Introducing My Friends the Strangers

=== Albums credited to Merle Haggard and the Strangers ===
Released	Album	US Country	Label
April 11, 1966	Just Between the Two of Us (with Bonnie Owens)	4	Capitol Records
October 17, 1966	Swinging Doors	1	Capitol Records
April 3, 1967	I'm a Lonesome Fugitive	3	Capitol Records
August 28, 1967	Branded Man	1	Capitol Records
January 8, 1968	Sing Me Back Home	1	Capitol Records
April 8, 1968	The Legend of Bonnie & Clyde	6	Capitol Records
September 9, 1968	Mama Tried	4	Capitol Records
February 10, 1969	Pride in What I Am	11	Capitol Records
May 12, 1969	Same Train, a Different Time	1	Capitol Records
September 15, 1969	A Portrait of Merle Haggard	3	Capitol Records
December 29, 1969	Okie from Muskogee	1	Capitol Records
July 6, 1970	The Fightin’ Side of Me	1	Capitol Records
November 16, 1970	A Tribute to the Best Damn Fiddle Player in the World (or, My Salute to Bob Wills)	2	Capitol Records
March 15, 1971	Hag	1	Capitol Records
August 16, 1971	Someday We'll Look Back	4	Capitol Records
November 8, 1971	The Land of Many Churches	15	Capitol Records
March 6, 1972	Let Me Tell You About a Song	7	Capitol Records
November 20, 1972	It's Not Love (But It's Not Bad)	1	Capitol Records
May 13, 1973	I Love Dixie Blues	1	Capitol Records
February 18, 1974	If We Make It Through December	4	Capitol Records
September 17, 1974	Merle Haggard Presents His 30th Album	1	Capitol Records
April 21, 1975	Keep Movin' On	1	Capitol Records
February 16, 1976	It's All in the Movies	1	Capitol Records
July 5, 1976	My Love Affair with Trains	7	Capitol Records
November 22, 1976	The Roots of My Raising	8	Capitol Records
September 12, 1977	A Working Man Can't Get Nowhere Today	28	Capitol Records

=== Singles credited to Merle Haggard and the Strangers ===
Year	Single	Peak chart positions				Album
Year	Single	US Country	US Hot 100	Canada Country	US Adult Contemporary	Album
1966	"Just Between the Two of Us" (with Bonnie Owens)	28	—	—	—	Just Between the Two of Us with Bonnie Owens
1966	"Swinging Doors"	5	—	—	—	Swinging Doors
1966	"The Bottle Let Me Down"	3	—	—	—	Swinging Doors
1967	"I'm a Lonesome Fugitive"	1	—	—	—	I'm a Lonesome Fugitive
1967	"Someone Told My Story"	32	—	—	—	I'm a Lonesome Fugitive
1967	"I Threw Away the Rose"	2	—	—	—	Branded Man
1967	"Branded Man"	1	—	—	—	Branded Man
1968	"Sing Me Back Home"	1	—	7	—	Sing Me Back Home
1968	"The Legend of Bonnie and Clyde"	1	—	3	—	The Legend of Bonnie & Clyde
1968	"Mama Tried"	1	—	1	—	Mama Tried
1969	"I Take a Lot of Pride in What I Am"	3	—	1	—	Pride in What I Am
1969	"Hungry Eyes"	1	—	2	—	A Portrait of Merle Haggard
1969	"Workin' Man Blues"	1	—	1	—	A Portrait of Merle Haggard
1969	"Okie from Muskogee"	1	41	3	—	Okie from Muskogee
1970	"The Fightin' Side of Me"	1	92	1	—	The Fightin’ Side of Me
1971	"Jesus, Take a Hold"	3	107	3	—	Hag
1971	"I Can't Be Myself" b/w "Sidewalks of Chicago"	3	106	2	—	Hag
1971	"Soldier's Last Letter"	3	90	—	—	Hag
1971	"Someday We'll Look Back"	2	119	2	—	Someday We'll Look Back
1971	"Carolyn"	1	58	2	35	Someday We'll Look Back
1972	"Daddy Frank (The Guitar Man)"	1	—	2	—	Let Me Tell You About a Song
1972	"Grandma Harp" b/w "Turnin' Off a Memory"	1	—	5	—	Let Me Tell You About a Song
1972	"It's Not Love (But It's Not Bad)"	1	—	1	—	It's Not Love (But It's Not Bad)
1973	"I Wonder If They Ever Think of Me"	1	—	1	—	I Love Dixie Blues
1973	"The Emptiest Arms in the World"	3	—	12	—	I Love Dixie Blues
1973	"Everybody's Had the Blues"	1	62	1	—	I Love Dixie Blues
1974	"If We Make It Through December"	1	28	1	16	If We Make It Through December
1974	"Things Aren't Funny Anymore"	1	—	2	—	Merle Haggard Presents His 30th Album
1974	"Old Man from the Mountain"	1	—	1	—	Merle Haggard Presents His 30th Album
1975	"Kentucky Gambler"	1	—	1	—	Keep Movin' On
1975	"Always Wanting You"	1	—	3	—	Keep Movin' On
1975	"Movin' On"	1	—	15	—	Keep Movin' On
1976	"It's All in the Movies"	1	—	11	—	It's All in the Movies
1976	"The Roots of My Raising"	1	—	7	—	The Roots of My Raising
1976	"Cherokee Maiden" b/w "What Have You Got Planned Tonight Diana"	1	—	1	—	The Roots of My Raising
1976	"Here Comes the Freedom Train"	10	—	1	—	My Love Affair with Trains
1977	"A Working Man Can't Get Nowhere Today"	16	—	8	—	A Working Man Can't Get Nowhere Today
1977	"Running Kind" b/w "Making Believe"	12	—	10	—	A Working Man Can't Get Nowhere Today
1978	"The Way It Was in '51"	82	—	58	—	The Way It Was in '51

=== Albums credited to Bonnie Owens and the Strangers ===
Year	Album	US Country	Label
1967	All of Me Belongs to You	35	Capitol Records
1969	Somewhere Between	34	Capitol Records
1969	Lead Me On	-	Capitol Records
1970	Mother's Favorite Hymns	-	Capitol Records

=== Singles credited to Bonnie Owens and the Strangers ===
Debut	Song	US Country	Album
November 19, 1966	Consider the Children	69	All of Me Belongs To You
February 15, 1969	Lead Me On	68	Lead Me On

=== Albums credited to Leona Williams and the Strangers ===
Year	Album	US Country	Label
1976	San Quentin’s First Lady	-	MCA Records

=== The Strangers as Backing Band ===
Artist	Album	Year
Merle Haggard	Merle Haggard's Christmas Present	1973
Merle Haggard	Rainbow Stew Live at Anaheim Stadium	1981
Merle Haggard	Songs for the Mama That Tried	1981
Merle Haggard	Big City	1981
Johnny Paycheck	Mr. Hag Told My Story	1981
Merle Haggard	Going Where the Lonely Go	1982
Merle Haggard	Goin' Home for Christmas	1982
Merle Haggard	That's the Way Love Goes	1983
Merle Haggard	The Epic Collection (Recorded Live)	1983
Merle Haggard and Leona Williams	Heart to Heart	1983
Rose Maddox	Queen of the West	1983
Merle Haggard	It's All in the Game	1984
Merle Haggard	Kern River	1985
Merle Haggard	Amber Waves of Grain	1985
Merle Haggard	A Friend in California	1986
Willie Nelson	The Promiseland	1986
Merle Haggard and Willie Nelson	Seashores of Old Mexico	1987
Merle Haggard	Chill Factor	1987
Merle Haggard	5:01 Blues	1989
Merle Haggard	Blue Jungle	1990
Merle Haggard	Live from Austin, TX ’85	2006
Merle Haggard	Live from Austin, TX ‘78	2008

== Contribution to Merle Haggard Albums ==
=== Songwriting ===
Song	Songwriter	Album	Year
Falling For You	Ralph Mooney	Strangers	1965
Mary's Mine	Jerry Ward	I'm a Lonesome Fugitive	1967
Blue Rock	Roy Nichols and Norm Hamlet	Okie from Muskogee	1969
In The Arms of Love (Gene Price on lead vocal)	Gene Price and Buck Owens	Okie from Muskogee	1969
Okie From Muskogee	Eddie Burris and Merle Haggard	Okie from Muskogee	1969
Hammin’ It Up	Norm Hamlet	The Fightin’ Side of Me	1970
Harold's Super Service	Bobby Wayne	The Fightin’ Side of Me	1970
Stealin’ Corn	Roy Nichols and Norm Hamlet	The Fightin’ Side of Me	1970
Champagne	Roy Nichols, Norm Hamlet, and Biff Adam	I Love Dixie Blues	1973
Come On Into My Arms	Marcia Nichols	If We Make It Through December	1974
Girl Who Made Me Laugh	Roy Nichols and Merle Haggard	Merle Haggard Presents His 30th Album	1974
It Don't Bother Me	Mark Yeary	Merle Haggard Presents His 30th Album	1974
Travelin’ (Ronnie Reno on lead vocal)	Tiny Moore and Ronnie Reno	Merle Haggard Presents His 30th Album	1974
I’ve Got A Darlin’	Ronnie Reno and Merle Haggard	Keep Movin' On	1975
After Loving You	Ronnie Reno, Merle Haggard, and Leona Williams	It's All in the Movies	1976
Cotton Patch Blues	Tiny Moore, Bob Wills, and Billy Joe Moore	It's All in the Movies	1976
I Won't Give Up My Train	Mark Yeary	My Love Affair with Trains	1976
Union Station	Ronnie Reno	My Love Affair with Trains	1976
I Always Get Lucky with You	Gary Church, Merle Haggard, Freddy Powers, and Tex Whitson	Big City	1981
I Think I'm Gonna Live Forever	Dennis Hromek, Merle Haggard, and Benny Binion	Big City	1981
Silver Eagle	Gary Church and Freddy Powers	A Taste of Yesterday's Wine	1982
My Life's Been Grand	Gordon Terry and Merle Haggard	Out Among the Stars	1986

=== Production ===
Producer	Album	Year
Roy Nichols	Goin' Home for Christmas	1982
Mark Yeary	5:01 Blues	1989
Mark Yeary	Blue Jungle	1990
Ronnie Reno	The Bluegrass Sessions	2007
Ronnie Reno	Timeless	2015

=== Lead Vocal ===
Lead Singer	Song	Album	Year
Gene Price	In The Arms of Love	Okie from Muskogee	1969
Ronnie Reno	Travelin’	Merle Haggard Presents His 30th Album	1974

=== Liner Notes ===
Liner Notes Writer	Album	Year
Mark Yeary	Keep Movin' On	1975

=== Merle call-outs ===
Merle Haggard famously called out members of the Strangers by name on his records prior to their solos. He sometimes prefixed their name with “Brother,” as in the song "I Think I'll Just Stay Here and Drink" when he called out “Brother Don” Markham. For 20 years (1969–1989) he regularly called out 16 different members of the Strangers and 14 guest musicians on 70 songs on 31 different albums. Roy Nichols received the most call-outs (42), followed by Norm Hamlet (24), Tiny Moore (13), Mark Yeary (10), and Don Markham (9). Below is a list of all the songs and Stranger call-outs Merle made over his career. Not listed are callouts the Strangers received by others than Merle, such as when Leona Williams called out Roy Nichols during “Yes Ma’am This One Can” on her 1976 Strangers-backed album “San Quentin’s First Lady,” or when Rose Maddox called Roy Nichols out prior to his “Downtown Modesto” solo on her 1983 Strangers-backed album “Queen of the West.”

Song	Call-Outs	Album	Year
Mule Skinner Blues	James Burton, Roy Nichols	Same Train, a Different Time	1969
No Hard Times	Roy Nichols	Same Train, a Different Time	1969
Silver Wings	Roy Nichols	Okie from Muskogee	1969
Blue Rock	Roy Nichols	Okie from Muskogee	1969
In The Arms of Love	Gene Price	Okie from Muskogee	1969
Brain Cloudy Blues	Eldon Shamblin, Tiny Moore, Roy Nichols, Johnny Gimble	A Tribute to the Best Damn Fiddle Player in the World (or, My Salute to Bob Wills)	1970
Stay a Little Longer	Biff Adam, Dennis Hromek, George French, Joe Holley, Tiny Moore, Roy Nichols, Alex Brashear	A Tribute to the Best Damn Fiddle Player in the World (or, My Salute to Bob Wills)	1970
Misery	Johnnie Lee Wills, Eldon Shamblin, Tiny Moore, Roy Nichols	A Tribute to the Best Damn Fiddle Player in the World (or, My Salute to Bob Wills)	1970
Roly Poly	Roy Nichols, Norm Hamlet, Alex Brashear	A Tribute to the Best Damn Fiddle Player in the World (or, My Salute to Bob Wills)	1970
Old Fashioned Love	Tiny Moore	A Tribute to the Best Damn Fiddle Player in the World (or, My Salute to Bob Wills)	1970
Corrine, Corrina	Johnny Gimble, George French, Joe Holley, Tiny Moore	A Tribute to the Best Damn Fiddle Player in the World (or, My Salute to Bob Wills)	1970
Take Me Back to Tulsa	George French, Johnny Gimble, Tiny Moore, Joe Holley	A Tribute to the Best Damn Fiddle Player in the World (or, My Salute to Bob Wills)	1970
Trouble in Mind	George French	Down Every Road 1962–1994	1970
Corrine, Corrina	Roy Nichols, Norm Hamlet, Chubby Wise	The Fightin’ Side of Me	1970
Every Fool Has a Rainbow	Roy Nichols	The Fightin’ Side of Me	1970
T.B. Blues	Norm Hamlet	The Fightin’ Side of Me	1970
When Did Right Become Wrong?	Norm Hamlet, Roy Nichols	The Fightin’ Side of Me	1970
Harold's Super Service	Bobby Wayne, Roy Nichols, Norm Hamlet	The Fightin’ Side of Me	1970
Stealin’ Corn	Biff Adam, Dennis Hromek, Bobby Wayne, Norm Hamlet, Roy Nichols	Introducing My Friends the Strangers	1970
Blue Rock	Roy Nichols, Norm Hamlet	Introducing My Friends the Strangers	1970
Where Could I Go But To The Lord?	Bobby Wayne	The Land of Many Churches	1971
I’ve Done It All	Bobby Wayne	Hag	1971
Stumblin	Al Bruno, Earl Poole Ball, Johnny Gimble, Roy Nichols, Norm Hamlet	Honky Tonkin’	1971
Bring It on Down to My House, Honey	Billy Leibert, Roy Nichols, Norm Hamlet	Let Me Tell You About a Song	1972
Big Bad Bill (Is Sweet William Now)	Roy Nichols	I Love Dixie Blues	1973
I Ain't Got Nobody	Roy Nichols	I Love Dixie Blues	1973
Nobody Knows I'm Hurtin’	Roy Nichols	I Love Dixie Blues	1973
The Emptiest Arms in the World	Norm Hamlet	I Love Dixie Blues	1973
Way Down Yonder in New Orleans	Gene Bowen, Dale Hampton, Biff Adam	I Love Dixie Blues	1973
Sitting on Top of the World	Roy Nichols, Marcia Nichols	Totally Instrumental...With One Exception	1973
I'm an Old Man	Norm Hamlet, Roy Nichols, Johnny Gimble	If We Make It Through December	1974
Come On into My Arms	Roy Nichols	If We Make It Through December	1974
Honky Tonk Night Time Man	Roy Nichols, Norm Hamlet	Merle Haggard Presents His 30th Album	1974
A Man's Gotta Give Up a Lot	Tiny Moore, Roy Nichols	Keep Movin' On	1975
Cotton Patch Blues	Eldon Shamblin, Tiny Moore, Roy Nichols	It's All in the Movies	1976
Living with The Shades Pulled Down	Tiny Moore	It's All in the Movies	1976
Stingaree	Roy Nichols, Glen Hardin	It's All in the Movies	1976
Gambling Polka Dot Blues	Roy Nichols, Norm Hamlet	The Roots of My Raising	1976
Moanin' the Blues	Glen Hardin, Norm Hamlet, Roy Nichols	A Working Man Can't Get Nowhere Today	1977
Silver Wings	Don Markham	Live from Austin, TX ’78	1978
Old Fashioned Love	Mark Yeary, Roy Nichols	Live from Austin, TX ’78	1978
Brain Cloudy Blues	Mark Yeary, Roy Nichols	Live from Austin, TX ’78	1978
Cherokee Maiden	Norm Hamlet, Don Markham	Live from Austin, TX ’78	1978
Got Lonely Too Early	Don Markham, Jimmy Capps	Serving 190 Proof	1979
(Remember Me) I'm the One Who Loves You	Roy Nichols, Don Markham	The Way I Am	1980
I Think I'll Just Stay Here and Drink	Don Markham	Back to the Barrooms	1980
Keep On the Sunny Side	Gordon Terry, Roy Nichols	Songs for the Mama That Tried	1981
I'm a Lonesome Fugitive	Roy Nichols	Rainbow Stew Live at Anaheim Stadium	1981
Rainbow Stew	Mark Yeary, Don Markham	Rainbow Stew Live at Anaheim Stadium	1981
Fiddle Breakdown	Tiny Moore, Gordon Terry	Rainbow Stew Live at Anaheim Stadium	1981
Good Old American Guest	Mark Yeary, Tiny Moore	Big City	1981
I Always Get Lucky with You	Don Markham, Norm Hamlet, Roy Nichols	Big City	1981
I Can’t Hold Myself in Line	Roy Nichols, Don Markham, Jimmy Murphy, Norm Hamlet	Johnny Paycheck’s Mr. Hag Told My Story	1981
Blue Yodel #2	Norm Hamlet, Don Markham	The Epic Collection (Recorded Live)	1983
Trouble in Mind	Tiny Moore	The Epic Collection (Recorded Live)	1983
(My Friends Are Gonna Be) Strangers	Roy Nichols	The Epic Collection (Recorded Live)	1983
Workin' Man Blues	Roy Nichols	The Epic Collection (Recorded Live)	1983
You Can’t Break the Chains of Love	Norm Hamlet	Heart to Heart	1983
Waitin’ on the Good Life to Come	Roy Nichols, Mark Yeary	Heart to Heart	1983
Don't Ever Let Your Love Sleep Alone	Mark Yeary	Heart to Heart	1983
Sally Let Your Bangs Hang Down	Tiny Moore, Jimmy Belken, Roy Nichols, Mark Yeary, Norm Hamlet	Heart to Heart	1983
All I Want to Do Is Sing My Song	Tiny Moore	It's All in the Game	1984
Thank Heaven for Little Girls	Jimmy Belken	It's All in the Game	1984
You Nearly Lose Your Mind	Norm Hamlet, Roy Nichols	It's All in the Game	1984
The Okie from Muskogee's Comin' Home	Roy Nichols, Mark Yeary	Live from Austin, TX ‘85	1985
Take Me Back to Tulsa	Gary Church	Live from Austin, TX ‘85	1985
I Knew the Moment I Lost You	Norm Hamlet	Live from Austin, TX ‘85	1985
Ida Red	Norm Hamlet, Clint Strong, Jimmy Belken	Live from Austin, TX ‘85	1985
The Okie from Muskogee's Comin' Home	Roy Nichols, Clint Strong, Mark Yeary	A Friend in California	1986
Broken Friend	Mark Yeary	5:01 Blues	1989

== Awards and recognition ==
=== Academy of Country Music Band of the Year Awards ===
Year	ACM Band of the Year
1966	Nominated
1967	Nominated
1968	Nominated
1969	Winner
1970	Winner
1971	Winner
1972	Winner
1973	Nominated
1974	Winner
1975	Winner
1976	Nominated
1977	Nominated
1980	Nominated
1981	Winner
1982	Nominated
1983	Nominated
1984	Nominated
1985	Nominated
1987	Winner
1988	Nominated

=== Music City News Band of the Year Awards ===
Year	Music City News Band of the Year
1971	Winner
1972	Winner

=== Academy of Country Music Awards Won With Merle Haggard ===
Year	Award	Recording
1969	Album of the Year	Okie from Muskogee
1969	Song of the Year	Okie From Muskogee
1969	Single of the Year	Okie From Muskogee

=== Country Music Association Awards Won With Merle Haggard ===
Year	Award	Recording
1970	Album of the Year	Okie from Muskogee
1970	Single of the Year	Okie From Muskogee
1972	Album of the Year	Let Me Tell You About a Song

=== Academy of Country Music Individual Nominations ===
Year	Guitarist of the Year	Steel Guitarist of the Year	Keyboardist of the Year	Bassist of the Year	Drummer of the Year	Fiddler of the Year	Specialty Instrument Player of the Year	Most Promising Vocalist	Song(writer) of the Year
1965	-	-	George French	-	-	-	-	-	-
1966	-	Ralph Mooney	George French	-	-	-	-	-	-
1967	-	Ralph Mooney	-	Jerry Ward	Biff Adam	-	-	-	-
1968	-	Ralph Mooney	-	-	Biff Adam	-	-	-	-
1969	Roy Nichols	Norm Hamlet	-	-	Biff Adam	Gordon Terry	-	-	-
1970	-	-	-	Dennis Hromek	Biff Adam	Gordon Terry	-	Bobby Wayne	-
1971	-	Norm Hamlet	-	Dennis Hromek	Biff Adam	Gordon Terry	-	-	-
1972	Roy Nichols	Norm Hamlet	-	Dennis Hromek	Biff Adam	-	-	-	-
1973	Roy Nichols	-	-	-	Biff Adam	-	-	-	-
1974	-	-	-	-	Biff Adam	-	-	-	-
1975	-	-	-	-	Biff Adam	-	-	-	-
1976	-	-	-	-	Biff Adam	-	-	-	-
1978	-	Ralph Mooney	-	-	-	-	-	-	-
1979	-	Ralph Mooney	-	-	-	Gordon Terry	-	-	-
1980	-	Ralph Mooney	-	-	-	-	-	-	-
1981	Roy Nichols	Ralph Mooney	-	-	Biff Adam	-	-	-	-
1982	-	-	-	-	-	Gordon Terry	Don Markham	-	-
1983	-	-	-	-	-	-	Tiny Moore	-	Gary Church
1987	-	Norm Hamlet	Mark Yeary	-	Biff Adam	-	-	-	-
1988	-	Norm Hamlet	-	-	-	-	-	-	-

=== Members in the Rock and Roll Hall of Fame ===
Stranger	Year Inducted	Band Inducted With	Inducted By
Tiny Moore	1999	Texas Playboys	Chris Isaak
Eldon Shamblin	1999	Texas Playboys	Chris Isaak
Johnny Meeks	2012	Blue Caps	Smokey Robinson

=== Merle Haggard’s poem for the Strangers ===
For the back cover of their 1973 album Totally Instrumental...With One Exception, Merle wrote the following poem for the Strangers:

When Hag passes on
To the great unknown
They'll find written on the front
Of my headstone
“Here lies a man
Who had a hell-of-a-band
And who would never had made it alone.”

=== Lynyrd Skynyrd Recognition ===
Lynyrd Skynyrd recorded Merle Haggard and the Strangers’ 1974 song "Honky Tonk Night Time Man" on their 1977 album Street Survivors. During Steve Gaines guitar solo, Ronnie Van Zant exclaims "Sounds like Roy!" as a tribute to the solo originally performed by Roy Nichols.

== Timeline 1966-1991 ==
Author	Book	Year
Charles R. Townsend	San Antonio Rose	1976
Merle Haggard	Sing Me Back Home	1981
Tiny Moore	Tiny Moore Mandolin Method	1982
Jonny Whiteside	Ramblin' Rose: The Life and Career of Rose Maddox	1997
Merle Haggard	For The Record	1999
Gerald Haslam	Workin' Man Blues	1999
Susan VanHecke	Race With The Devil	2000
Ken Nelson	My First 90 Years Plus 3	2007
Gary Church	Autobiography of a Nobody	2012
Freddy Powers	The Spree of '83	2017
Rachel Lee Rubin	Okie from Muskogee	2018
Fuzzy Owen	Merle Haggard, Bonnie Owens, & Me	2019
Raymond H. McDonald	Merle Haggard was a Friend of Mine	2021
David Cantwell	The Running Kind	2022
Marc Eliot	The Hag: The Life, Times, and Music of Merle Haggard	2022
