= (My Friends Are Gonna Be) Strangers =

1964 song by Liz Anderson

Single by Merle Haggard

from the album Strangers
- B-side: "Please Mr. D.J."
- Released: November 2, 1964
- Genre: Country
- Length: 2:20
- Label: Capitol
- Songwriter: Liz Anderson
- Producers: Ken Nelson; Fuzzy Owen

Merle Haggard singles chronology
"Sam Hill" (1964)	"(My Friends Are Gonna Be) Strangers" (1964)	"I'm Gonna Break Every Heart I Can" (1965)

"(From Now On All My Friends Are Gonna Be) Strangers"

Single by Roy Drusky
- B-side: "Birmingham Jail"
- Released: January 4, 1965
- Genre: Country
- Length: 2:23
- Label: Mercury
- Songwriter: Liz Anderson
- Producers: Shelby Singleton; Jerry Kennedy

Roy Drusky singles chronology
"Summer, Winter, Spring and Fall" (1964)	"(From Now On All My Friends Are Gonna Be) Strangers" (1965)	"Yes, Mr. Peters" (1965)

"(My Friends Are Gonna Be) Strangers" is a song written by Liz Anderson. Best remembered as American country music artist Merle Haggard's first national top-10 record, it was also a top-10 song concurrently for Roy Drusky. The song is also known as All My Friends Are Gonna Be Strangers, (From Now On) All My Friends Are Gonna Be Strangers, and simply Strangers. Haggard went on to name his band the Strangers after the record's success. The song was subsequently recorded by scores of additional country stars as album tracks, including George Jones, Ernest Tubb, Porter Wagoner, and Ferlin Husky, as well as Liz Anderson herself and her daughter Lynn Anderson.

== Background and writing ==
Liz Anderson wrote the song circa 1964 and had sent it to Nashville producers. Her friend Bonnie Owens encouraged her to meet with Haggard (Owens' beau at the time) and pitch some of her songs to the newcomer. Anderson was reluctant to do so, having already had songs recorded by national artists and not particularly interested in a regional performer and having never heard Haggard, not certain he had talent' but agreed to meet with him out of her loyalty to Owens. Haggard likewise had never heard of Anderson and was not particularly pleased that Bonnie insisted they go to the Anderson home to listen to some songs. Merle and Liz hit it off, though, and both proved to be in awe of the other's talents, with Haggard eventually recording several songs by Anderson he heard that night. He was particularly taken with "(My Friends Are Gonna Be) Strangers" and rushed into the studio to record it and planned it for a single release. After the track had been cut and the single printed, all involved learned Roy Drusky had also just recorded it and was releasing it as a single. Although both Drusky and Haggard versions eventually made it into the Billboard Hot Country Singles top 10, the competing records undoubtedly kept either version for being a top-five and perhaps number-one record.

== Content ==
The song's narrator is embittered by a deceitful lover, not only vowing to be through with love, but also not trusting in anyone at all.

== Chart performance ==
=== Merle Haggard ===
Chart (1964–1965)	Peak position
US Hot Country Songs (Billboard)	10

=== Roy Drusky ===
Chart (1965)	Peak position
US Hot Country Songs (Billboard)	6
