= Okie from Muskogee (song) =

Single by Merle Haggard and The Strangers

from the album Okie from Muskogee
- B-side: "If I Had Left It Up to You"
- Released: September 29, 1969
- Recorded: July 17, 1969 (studio version)
- Genre: Country
- Length: 2:42 (studio version); 3:29 (live version)
- Label: Capitol 2626
- Songwriters: Roy Edward Burris; Merle Haggard
- Producer: Fuzzy Owen

Merle Haggard and The Strangers singles chronology
"Workin' Man Blues" (1969)	"Okie from Muskogee" (1969)	"The Fightin' Side of Me" (1970)

"Okie from Muskogee" is a song recorded by American country music artist Merle Haggard and The Strangers, which Haggard co-wrote with drummer Roy Edward Burris. "Okie" is a slang name for someone from Oklahoma, and Muskogee (population 40,000) is the 13th largest city in the state. The song was released in September 1969 as first single and title track from the album Okie from Muskogee, and was one of the most famous songs of Haggard's career.

== Background ==
Haggard told The Boot that he wrote the song after he became disheartened watching Vietnam War protests and incorporated that emotion and viewpoint into song. Haggard says, "When I was in prison, I knew what it was like to have freedom taken away. Freedom is everything. During Vietnam, there were all kinds of protests. Here were these [servicemen] going over there and dying for a cause—we don't even know what it was really all about. And here are these young kids, that were free, bitching about it. There's something wrong with that and with [disparaging] those poor guys." He states that he wrote the song to support the troops. "We were in a wonderful time in America, and music was in a wonderful place. America was at its peak, and what the hell did these kids have to complain about? These soldiers were giving up their freedom and lives to make sure others could stay free. I wrote the song to support those soldiers."

In a 2010 interview with American Songwriter, Haggard called the song a "character study", his 1969 self being the character: "It was the photograph that I took of the way things looked through the eyes of a fool... and most of America was under the same assumptions I was. As it's stayed around now for 40 years, I sing the song now with a different attitude onstage... I've become educated... I play it now with a different projection. It's a different song now. I'm different now."

Critic Kurt Wolff wrote that Haggard always considered what became a redneck anthem to be a spoof, and that today fans—even the hippies who are derided in the lyrics—have taken a liking to the song and find humor in some of the lyrics. Cover versions of the song were recorded by such countercultural acts as the Grateful Dead, The Beach Boys, Phil Ochs, The Flaming Lips, The String Cheese Incident, The Good Brothers and Hank Williams III backed by seminal stoner metal band The Melvins, all of which are and/or were avid users of marijuana, LSD, and other psychedelic drugs that the song condemns.

Written by Haggard and Roy Edward Burris (drummer for Haggard's backing band, and The Strangers) during the height of the Vietnam War, "Okie from Muskogee" grew from the two trading one-liners about small-town life, where conservative values were the norm and outsiders with ideals contrary to those ways were unwelcome. In the song, the singer reflects on how proud he is to hail from Middle America, where its residents were patriotic and did not smoke marijuana, take LSD, wear beads and sandals, burn draft cards or challenge authority.

While it can be viewed as a satire of small-town America and its reaction to the antiwar protests and counterculture seen in America's larger cities, AllMusic writer Bill Janovitz writes that the song also "convincingly [gives] voice to a proud, strait-laced truck-driver type... in the end, he identifies with the narrator. He does not position the protagonist as angry, reactionary, or judgmental; it is more that the guy, a self-confessed 'square', is confused by such changes and with a chuckle comes to the conclusion that he and his ilk have the right sort of life for themselves."

== Chart performance and popularity ==
"Okie from Muskogee" immediately broke in popularity when released in late September 1969. By November 15, it reached No. 1 on the Billboard magazine Hot Country Singles chart, where it remained for four weeks. It also became a minor pop hit as well, reaching number 41 on the Billboard Hot 100 chart.

The version of "Okie from Muskogee" that reached No. 1 was the studio recording. After the song became widely popular, a live concert recording was issued and although that version never charted, it became very popular as well. The live version's distinguishing characteristics include an enthusiastic crowd and Merle responding with his own quips at the end of at least two verses. The most popular live version, and the only live version released as a single, was recorded during a 1970 Haggard concert in Philadelphia that became the live album The Fightin' Side of Me. The song was included on a couple of Haggard's other live albums from the era, notably "Okie From Muskogee", released in 1969 and "I Love Dixie Blues", released in 1973. However, these recordings are not the live version the general public is familiar with.

"Okie from Muskogee"—along with the album, Okie from Muskogee—was named the Country Music Association Single and Album of the Year in 1970.

=== Chart history ===
Chart (1969–1970)	Peak position
US Hot Country Songs (Billboard)	1
US Billboard Hot 100	41
Canadian RPM Country Tracks	3

== Parodies and cover versions ==
The song was the subject of parody versions by The Youngbloods as "Hippie From Olema", by David Peel and The Lower East Side Band as "Hippie From New York City", by Patrick Sky as "Okie", by C. Dean Draper as "The Only Hippie in Muskogee", by Chesley Carroll as "Hippie from Mississippi", and most notably by Chinga Chavin as "Asshole from El Paso"; the latter in particular uses Haggard's melody but substitutes more extreme lyrics. Kinky Friedman later covered "Asshole from El Paso" and the song subsequently became more associated with Friedman than with Chavin. The Grateful Dead has played the song live with The Beach Boys. Phil Ochs performed the song as included in a 1970 album recorded live at Carnegie Hall. In New Zealand, comedian Jon Gadsby recorded a local version as a satire, called "Scourer from Mataura" (a scourer being a worker in a wool processing plant). Perhaps the best known parody/response to the song is Ray Wylie Hubbard's "Up Against the Wall Redneck Mother" which was covered by the late Jerry Jeff Walker.

Straight cover versions of the song were recorded by the Melvins on their album The Crybaby with Hank Williams III providing vocals, Tommy Cash in 1970, and Jeannie C. Riley's cover from the early 1970s. A hippie-ish cover version was recorded by Teegarden and Van Winkle in 1970. The Beach Boys covered the song and placed on their 2011 album Live & Alternative songs. The group's cover can also be heard in the 1985 biographical musical film, The Beach Boys: An American Band.

John Denver performed a live version of the song, with backing vocals provided by Taffy Nivert. Denver modified lyrics from Patrick Sky's parody version, from his album Songs That Made America Famous, in which the Okie wanted to "join the Ku Klux", burn the Hippies, and be loved, or he'd punch you in the mouth.

The David Nelson Band has performed a song called "Humboldt County Hippie" at various performances. The song lyrics parallel and are a parody of Haggard's song.
