= Leona Williams =

American singer-songwriter

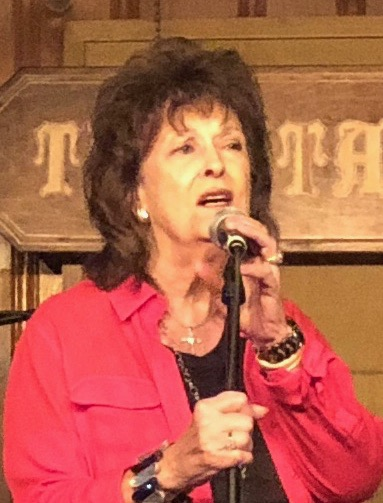

Background information
- Born: Leona Belle Helton; January 7, 1943 (age 82)
- Origin: Vienna, Missouri, U.S.
- Genres: Country, Honky Tonk
- Occupation: Singer
- Instrument(s): Vocals; Bass guitar Acoustic Guitar
- Years active: 1958–present
- Labels: Hickory; MCA; Elektra

Leona Belle Helton (born January 7, 1943, in Vienna, Missouri, United States) is an American country music singer known professionally as Leona Williams. Active since 1958, Williams has been a backing musician for Loretta Lynn and Merle Haggard and The Strangers. She also charted eight times on Hot Country Songs, with her only Top 40 hit being a duet with Haggard titled "The Bull and the Beaver."

== Biography ==
Leona Belle Helton was born January 7, 1943, in Vienna, Missouri. Active in her family's band since childhood, she had a radio program on KWOS in Jefferson City, Missouri, when she was fifteen. Later, she worked as a bass guitarist and backing vocalist in Loretta Lynn's road band.

In 1968, Williams signed to the Hickory record label and released two singles: "Once More" and "Country Girl with Hot Pants On." In 1976, she recorded the album San Quentin's First Lady for MCA Records, which was the first country album recorded by a female artist inside a prison.

In the mid-1970s, Williams joined Merle Haggard's road band The Strangers, supplanting his estranged wife, Bonnie Owens. She wrote several of Haggard's songs, including two of his No. 1 hits, "Someday When Things Are Good", and "You Take Me For Granted". She also wrote songs for Connie Smith ("Dallas"), Loretta Lynn ("Get Whatcha Got And Go"), Tammy Wynette ("Broad-Minded") and George Jones ("Best Friends"), among others. In 1978, Williams and Haggard charted in the country Top Ten with the song "The Bull and the Beaver." In 1981, she charted another duet with Haggard titled "We're Strangers Again."

Williams continues to tour with her son, Ron Williams. In 2017, she won the Honky Tonk Female honour at the Ameripolitan Music Awards.

== Personal life ==
Between 1978 and 1983, Williams was married to Merle Haggard. In 1985, she married singer-songwriter Dave Kirby and remained married to him until his 2004 death. From 2005, she was with Ferlin Husky, and remained with him for the last six years of his life.

== Discography ==
=== Albums ===
Year	Album information	Chart Positions
Year	Album information	US Country
1970	That Williams Girl: Label: Hickory Records; Format: LP	—
1972	The Best Of Leona Williams: Label: Hickory Records; Format: LP	—
1976	San Quentin's First Lady (with The Strangers): Label: MCA Records; Format: LP	—
1983	Heart to Heart (with Merle Haggard): Label: Mercury Records; Format: LP	44
1984	Someday When Things Are Good: Label: Mercury Records; Format: LP	—
1999	Melted Down Memories: Label: Loveshine Records; Format: CD	—
2001	Old Love Never Dies (with Merle Haggard): Label: Bear Family; Format: CD	—
2002	This is Leona Williams Country (with Merle Haggard): Label: Ernest Tubb Record Shops; Format: CD	—
2004	Honorary Texan: Label: Heart of Texas; Format: CD	—
2005	I Love You Because: Label: Heart of Texas; Format: CD	—
2008	Sings Merle Haggard: Label: Ah-Ha Music Group; Format: CD	—
2008	New Patches: Label: Heart of Texas; Format: CD	—
2011	Grass Roots: Label: Loveshine; Format: CD	—
2011	Duets: Label: Loveshine; Format: CD	—
2012	By George This is...Leona Williams: Label: Ah-Ha; Format: CD	—
2013	Yes Ma'm, He Found Me in a Honky Tonk: Label: Bear Family; Format: 3-CD set	—
2022	Keepin' It Country: Label: Double C Records; Format: CD	—

=== Singles ===
List of singles, with selected chart positions
Title	Year	Peak chart positions	Album
Title	Year	US Country	Album
"A Woman's Man"	1968	—	That Williams Girl
"Papa's Medicine Show"	1968	—	That Williams Girl
"They'll Never Take His Love from Me"	1969	—	That Williams Girl
"Once More"	1969	66	That Williams Girl
"Baby, We're Really in Love"	1969	—	That Williams Girl
"When I Stop Dreaming"	1970	—	That Williams Girl
"Yes Ma'am, He Found Me in a Honky Tonk"	1970	—	—
"Watch Her Go"	1970	—	—
"Somewhere Inside"	1971	—	—
"Country Girl with Hot Pants On"	1971	52	—
"Country Music in My Soul"	1971	—	—
"Happy Anniversary, Baby"	1972	—	—
"Out of Hand"	1972	—	—
"I'd Rather Die"	1973	—	—
"I Can't Tell My Heart That"	1973	—	—
"Your Shoeshine Girl"	1973	93	—
"Anything Goes ('Til Everything's Gone)"	1973	—	—
"I'm Not Supposed to Love You Anymore"	1974	—	—
"Just Like a Prayer"	1974	—	—
"Shape Up or Ship Out"	1975	—	—
"I Wonder Where I'll Find You at Tonight"	1976	—	San Quentin's First Lady
"San Quentin"	1976	—	San Quentin's First Lady
"Mama, I've Got to Go to Memphis"	1978	—	—
"Bright Morning Light"	1978	—	—
"The Baby Song"	1979	92	—
"Good Nights Make Good Mornings"	1979	—	—
"Any Port in a Storm"	1980	—	—
"I'm Almost Ready"	1981	54	—
"You Can't Find Many Kisses"	1981	—	—
"Always Late with Your Kisses"	1981	84	—
"Rock Me to Sleep"	1986	—	A Taste of Life
"No Love Line"	1986	—	A Taste of Life
"—" denotes releases that did not chart.

=== Collaborative singles ===
List of singles, with selected chart positions
Title	Year	Peak chart positions		Album
Title	Year	US Country	CAN Country	Album
"The Bull and the Beaver" (with Merle Haggard)	1978	8	25	—
"We're Strangers Again" (with Merle Haggard)	1983	42	—	Heart to Heart
"Waitin' for the Good Life to Come" (with Merle Haggard)	1983	—	—	Heart to Heart
"It's Cold in California" (with Merle Haggard)	1984	—	—	Heart to Heart
"—" denotes releases that did not chart.
