= The Fightin' Side of Me =

Single by Merle Haggard and The Strangers

from the album The Fightin' Side of Me
- B-side: "Every Fool Has a Rainbow"
- Released: January 26, 1970
- Recorded: December 23, 1969 (studio version)
- Genre: Country
- Length: 2:52 (studio version); 3:11 (live version)
- Label: Capitol 2719
- Songwriter: Merle Haggard
- Producer: Ken Nelson

Merle Haggard and The Strangers singles chronology
"Okie from Muskogee" (1969)	"The Fightin' Side of Me" (1970)	"Street Singer" (1970)

"The Fightin' Side of Me" is a song written and recorded by American country music artist Merle Haggard and The Strangers. It was released in January 1970 as the first single and title track from the album The Fightin' Side of Me. The song became one of the most famous of his career.

In reference to his own 2002 song, "Courtesy of the Red, White, & Blue (The Angry American)," Toby Keith once called this song "the original Angry American song."

== Content ==
Like "Okie from Muskogee," "The Fightin' Side of Me" catered to the conservative working-man's values and politics; Bill Janovitz of Allmusic called the song "patriotic (if not outrightly jingoistic)."

Here, the singer fills the role of a man frustrated with people deriding the country, particularly those who are "harpin' on the wars we fight" and "runnin' down my countrymen," a reference to the then-ongoing Vietnam War. People who do this, claims the singer, are "walkin' on the fightin' side of me" and warns them that "if you don't love it, leave it."

== Chart performance and popularity ==
Like its predecessor "Okie from Muskogee," "The Fightin' Side of Me" immediately broke in popularity when released in January 1970. The song reached No. 1 on the Billboard magazine Hot Country Singles chart, where it remained for three weeks. It also charted in the lower regions of the Billboard Hot 100 chart.

In addition to the studio version of the song, a live version of "The Fightin' Side of Me" was issued as part of Haggard's live album of the same name.

Chart (1970)	Peak position
US Hot Country Songs (Billboard)	1
US Billboard Hot 100	92
Canadian RPM Country Tracks	1

== Awards ==
In 1970, "The Fightin' Side of Me" was nominated for Song of the Year and Single of the Year by the Country Music Association. The song did not win either award, with it losing the Single award to "Okie from Muskogee."

== Other Recordings ==
John Anderson recorded a version of this song on his 1986 album Countrified.
