= Eldon Shamblin =

American guitarist and arranger (1916–1998)

- Born: Estel Eldon Shamblin; April 24, 1916; Clinton, Oklahoma, U.S.
- Died: August 5, 1998 (aged 82) Tulsa, Oklahoma
- Genres: Western swing, country
- Occupation: Musician
- Instrument: Guitar
- Years active: 1930s–1990s
- Formerly of: Bob Wills, Merle Haggard, the Strangers

Eldon Shamblin (April 24, 1916 – August 5, 1998) was an American guitarist and arranger, particularly important to the development of Western swing music as one of the first electric guitarists in a popular dance band. He was a member of the Strangers during the 1970s and 1980s and was the last surviving member of Bob Wills' band the Texas Playboys.

== Career ==
In his teens, Shamblin learned about guitar by analyzing the techniques of Eddie Lang. He performed in clubs in Oklahoma City and on his radio show as singer and guitarist. During the 1930s, he spent three years as a member of the Alabama Boys, a Western swing band. In 1937 he became a member of a Bob Wills and His Texas Playboys. As the band's arranger and its first electric guitarist, Shamblin moved it closer to jazz. During World War II, he served in the military for four years, then returned to Wills and remained with the band until the middle 1950s. Soon after, he left music, gave guitar lessons in Tulsa, and operated a convenience store. Shamblin recorded with Merle Haggard on a tribute album to Bob Wills which was released in 1970, then worked intermittently with Haggard on tours during the next five years. Aside from Wills and Haggard, he recorded with Leon McAuliffe, Tiny Moore, Willie Nelson, Joe Venuti, and Asleep at the Wheel.

Wills told Shamblin what to play on two occasions. While recording "Ida Red", he told Shamblin to put a lot of runs in his rhythm chords to keep up with the bassist. He told him to imitate Junior Barnard, who had been part of the band and had a bluesy style. Shamblin was instructed to play louder and bend strings.

Shamblin incorporated a big band style similar to Freddie Green's with the Count Basie Orchestra. His acoustic, single string, lead guitar work in the 1930s resonated with the influence of Lang and Django Reinhardt, while his brief chord solos evoked the harmonies of George Van Eps. By the 1940s, his style was reminiscent of early bebop, with the occasional chord flourish added to good effect.

Shamblin and steel guitarist Leon McAuliffe began experimenting with what would become their Twin Guitar idiom. At a rehearsal years later, Wills heard what they were doing and asked them to work up a solo arrangement for a fiddle tune he was going to record called "Bob Wills Special". A few days later Wills asked them to write an instrumental that would feature them. They came up with "Twin Guitar Special", which Wills recorded with his fiddle tune in 1940. The other song was "Twin Guitar Boogie". Wills never recorded it, but McAuliffe did in the 1960s under the name "Bouncing Bobby", a nickname for fiddler Bobby Bruce. In December 1973, Wills made his last recording with the Playboys. Shamblin and McAuliffe played "Twin Guitar Special" but it was renamed "Twin Guitar Boogie", with the two of them listed as composers.

In 1941 Metronome magazine called Shamblin the most inventive guitarist since Charlie Christian, who was also a native of Oklahoma. Thirty years later, a Rolling Stone writer repeated the praise of Metronome. Down Beat magazine acknowledged his contributions, calling him a jazz-oriented swing musician though he worked in Western swing and country bands.

== Army service and teaching ==
Shamblin was drafted into the Army in 1942. He served for four years and was a lieutenant in the Service Battery 924th Field Artillery 99th Infantry Division Third Army in the European Theater of War and fought in the Battle of the Bulge. After playing with Leon McAuliffe's Western Swing Band in Tulsa, he returned to the Texas Playboys in September 1946 in Fresno, California. He spent ten years with the band before joining Hoyle Nix and the West Texas Cowboys in Big Spring, Texas, where they played at the Stampede Ballroom.

After two years with the Nix band, he returned to Tulsa, managed a convenience store, and attended night school to earn a license in accounting. He decided the accounting business was not for him and began teaching guitar at the Guitar House music store. He became a piano tuner and electronic organ serviceman.

In 1970, Shamblin returned to music when he was asked to help organize a tribute to Bob Wills and played on Merle Haggard's album A Tribute to the Best Damn Fiddle Player in the World (or, My Salute to Bob Wills). He then became a member of Haggard's band, the Strangers.

In the 1980s, Eldon, along with Leon McAuliffe and Junior Brown taught music at Rogers State University in Claremore, Oklahoma.

== Later years ==
In 1983 Shamblin left the Strangers because he was tired of the touring. He returned to Tulsa and joined a late version of the Texas Playboys in 1983 led by Leon McAuliffe, who led the Original Texas Playboys band which had been reassembled in 1971 for the first occasion of Bob Wills Days in Turkey, Texas. The Original Playboys recorded several albums for Delta Records, which re-released an album that had been recorded locally called Eldon Shamblin – Guitar Genius. Shamblin recorded 'S Wonderful: Four Giants of Swing by Joe Venuti with Jethro Burns and Curly Chalker.

Shamblin is noted for being one of the earliest adopters of the Fender Stratocaster electric guitar. A demonstration model painted gold and dated 6/4/54 was given to him by Leo Fender. Shamblin played the guitar with the Texas Playboys in what became the final Bob Wills recording session for MGM Records, later taking it on the road with Bob Wills on a month and half long tour of the great Northwest. Rock guitarist Eric Clapton called Shamblin at his home in Tulsa and offered him $10,000 for it in the early 1980s. Shamblin declined and sold the instrument to legendary Rock and Country Promoter Larry Shaeffer, a good friend of Eldon's and owner of Cain's Ballroom and Little Wing Productions. Shaeffer sold the guitar to well known Vintage Guitar Dealer Larry Briggs (also of Tulsa) years later, and Briggs then traded it to Dave Crocker of Missouri for his stake in the Vintage Guitar Show(s). It was purchased by Mr. Proler of Texas.

The Stratocaster was loaned to guitarist and collector Joe Bonamassa for a year. It is now back in Mr. Proler's collection.

By 1996 Shamblin was in ill health and retired from music except for rare appearances. He died in a nursing home in Sapulpa, Oklahoma, on August 5, 1998. He was posthumously inducted into the Rock and Roll Hall of Fame in 1999 with Bob Wills and a select group of Texas Playboys. He was inducted into the Oklahoma Music Hall of Fame in 2006.

== Discography ==
=== As leader ===
- S'Wonderful: 4 Giants of Swing with Jethro Burns, Curly Chalker, Joe Venuti (Flying Fish, 1975)
- Guitar Genius (Delta, 1981)

=== As sideman ===
With Asleep at the Wheel

- Wheelin' & Dealin' (Capitol, 1976)
- A Tribute to the Music of Bob Wills & the Texas Playboys (Liberty, 1993)

With Merle Haggard

- A Tribute to the Best Damn Fiddle Player in the World (or, My Salute to Bob Wills) (Capitol, 1970)
- 5:01 Blues (Epic, 1989)

With The Tractors

- Tractors (1994)
- Farmers in a Changing World (1998)

With Bob Wills

- For the Last Time (United Artists, 1974)
- The Tiffany Transcriptions (1982)
- Heaven, Hell, or Houston (1983)
- San Antonio Rose (2000)

With others

- Take It Away Leon, Leon McAuliffe (1974)
- The Mac Wiseman Story, Mac Wiseman (1976)
- Joe in Chicago, Joe Venuti (Flying Fish, 1979)
- Back to Back, Tiny Moore and Jethro Burns (1979)
- Heroes, Mark O'Connor (Warner Bros., 1993)
