= Gene Price =

American songwriter

Gene Price (February 27, 1944 – August 13, 2013), also credited as Willard Eugene Price and Willard E. Price, was an American songwriter, primarily noted for his songwriting association with Buck Owens. He was also a member of Merle Haggard's backing band The Strangers.

== History ==
Price was a musician and vocalist, in addition to being a songwriter. He was born in Shamrock, Texas. His initial success was through his association with the "Bakersfield sound". Price was a bass player for Merle Haggard and a songwriter with Buck Owens. He was particularly successful as a recorded songwriter on various Capitol Records releases in the early 1970s. One of his best known songs is "In The Arms of Love", co-written with Owens and recorded by Merle Haggard, Susan Raye, Wynn Stewart and Freddie Hart, among others.

Other songs for which Price is known include "Let's Keep The Memories Warm", solely written by Price and recorded by Terry Stafford in 1973, for inclusion on Stafford's album Say, Has Anybody Seen My Sweet Gypsy Rose (Atlantic, 1973) Other songs written with Owens include "The Biggest Storm of All", "Natural Born Loser", "Across This Town and Gone","Something's Wrong", "I'll Be All Right Tomorrow" and "I've Carried This Torch Much Too Long".

Later in his career, Price had a degree of pop music success with some of his songs. For example, his song "Come To Me", solely written by Price, was recorded twice by Aretha Franklin within a 10-year period.
