= Stay a Little Longer =

Single by Bob Wills and His Texas Playboys
- B-side: "I Can't Go On This Way"
- Released: 1946
- Recorded: 1945
- Genre: Western swing
- Label: Columbia
- Songwriter(s): Bob Wills, Tommy Duncan

"Stay a Little Longer" is a Western swing dance tune written by Bob Wills and Tommy Duncan. The title comes from a refrain in the chorus:

Stay all night, stay a little longer,
Dance all night, dance a little longer,
Pull off your coat, throw it in the corner,
Don't see why you can't stay a little longer.

The song consists of a number of unrelated verses, one of which (verse three) comes from an old folk song – "Shinbone Alley":

You ought to see my Blue Eyed Sally,
She lives way down on Shinbone Alley.
Number on the gate, the number on the door,
The next house over is the grocery store.

Bob Wills and the Texas Playboys recorded it in 1945 and it reached number three in 1946. Willie Nelson (number 22 in 1973) and Mel Tillis (number 17 in 1982) also charted Top 40 hits. The song has been recorded numerous times.

In The Andy Griffith Show episode "The Darling Baby", the lyrics went like this:

Stay all night, stay a little longer,
Dance all night, dance a little longer,
Take off your coat, throw it in the corner,
Don't see why you can't stay a little longer.

I've got a gal, her name is Sally,
She lives down the Shinbone Alley.
Number on the gate, the number on the door,
The next house over is the grocery store.

== Bibliography ==
- Cohen, Norm. Folk Music: A Regional Exploration. Greenwood Press, 2005. ISBN 0-313-32872-2
- Whitburn, Joel. The Billboard Book of Top 40 Country Hits. Billboard Books, 2006. ISBN 0-8230-8291-1
