= Tiny Moore =

American Western swing musician (1920–1987)

Billie "Tiny" Moore (May 12, 1920 – December 15, 1987) was an American Western swing musician who played the electric mandolin and fiddle with Bob Wills and the Texas Playboys in the 1940s. He played with The Strangers and Merle Haggard during the 1970s and 1980s.

== Career ==
Moore was born in the Gulf Coast town of Port Arthur, Texas, in 1920. His primary instrument was electric mandolin. While a member of the Texas Playboys from 1946 to 1950, he played Gibson electric mandolins: at first an EM-125, and sometime after 1948, an EM-150. Although these are 8-string mandolins, Moore used four single strings instead of pairs. This made his mandolin sound like an electric guitar. In 1952, he commissioned a five-string electric mandolin from Paul Bigsby. Moore was playing in a band led by Bob Wills' brother, Billy Jack. The Bigsby 5-string mandolin had single courses of strings (rather than the paired courses on a standard mandolin) and added a low C string to the standard G, D, A and E. This tuning actually gives the instrument a wider range of notes than a guitar.

Western swing is a hybrid of country, blues, and jazz; Moore's style of playing draws from all of these sources. Moore and his Bigsby mandolin were identified with each other for the remainder of his career.

In the mid-1960s he taught group guitar lessons at the local YMCA in Sacramento, California. He taught every style of music. He operated Tiny Moore Music, a music store in Sacramento, and sold copies of the Bigsby mandolin built by Jay Roberts of Yuba City.

Tiny joined Merle Haggard's band The Strangers (American band) full time from 1973 to 1976, and continued to play with them intermittingly for another 10 years. He also recorded two albums with for Kaleidoscope Records: Back to Back (1979), a duet album with Jethro Burns, and the solo record Tiny Moore Music (1980). He continued playing music, often with Eldon Shamblin, until he had a fatal heart attack onstage while playing with the Cadillac Band at a club in Jackpot, Nevada, on December 15, 1987.

In 1982, he was inducted into the Western Swing Society's Hall of Fame.

In 1995 he was posthumously inducted into the Texas Western Swing Hall of Fame, along with his wife Dean McKinney Moore.

In 1999, Moore was posthumously inducted into the Rock and Roll Hall of Fame (Category: Early Influences) as a member of Bob Wills and His Texas Playboys.

== Solo Discography ==
- Back To Back (1979, Kaleidoscope Records) with Jethro Burns
- Tiny Moore Music (1980, Kaleidoscope Records)
