= Bonnie Owens =

American country music singer-songwriter (1924–2006)

Background information
- Born: Bonnie Campbell; October 1, 1929; Blanchard, Oklahoma, U.S.
- Died: April 24, 2006 (aged 76)
- Genres: Country
- Occupation: Singer-songwriter
- Instruments: Vocals, guitar
- Years active: 1949–1981
- Labels: Tally; Capitol

Bonnie Owens (born Bonnie Campbell; October 1, 1929 – April 24, 2006) was an American country music singer who was married to Buck Owens and later to Merle Haggard.

== Biography ==
She was born Bonnie Campbell in Blanchard, Oklahoma, United States. She met Buck Owens when she was 15. They played in a band in Mesa, Arizona, and married in 1948. They were the parents of musician Buddy Alan. They moved to Bakersfield, California, by 1951 and started music careers. They divorced in 1953.

Bonnie Owens's first recording was "A Dear John Letter", a duet with Fuzzy Owen on Mar-Vel Records (#MV-102) in 1953. The B-side contained the song "Wonderful World".

Owens recorded on numerous labels during the 1950s and early 1960s, including Merle Haggard’s and Fuzzy Owen's own Tally label, all of which were singles. Her first album titled Don't Take Advantage of Me came in 1965 on Capitol Records # ST-2403.

Owens had hits on the country chart in the early 1960s with the songs "Why Don't Daddy Live Here Anymore?" and "Don't Take Advantage of Me". In 1965, Haggard and Owens recorded the song "Just Between the Two of Us", a duet, and probably Owens's best known hit. It is also the title song to their 1966 duet album on Capitol Records (#ST-2453), that was recorded with The Strangers.

Bonnie Owens was named Female Vocalist of the Year in 1965 by the Academy of Country Music. She and Haggard married the same year. From this point, Owens dedicated her time to Haggard's children and his career, touring with Merle's band The Strangers as a backup vocalist.

Owens and Haggard divorced in 1978; after a brief hiatus, she continued touring with him.

On April 24, 2006, Owens died at the age of 76, in hospice for Alzheimer's disease.

== Discography ==
=== Albums ===
Year	Album	US Country
1965	Don't Take Advantage of Me	15
1966	Just Between the Two of Us (with Merle Haggard and The Strangers)	4
1967	All of Me Belongs to You (with The Strangers)	35
1968	Somewhere Between (with The Strangers)	34
1969	Hi-Fi to Cry By	
1969	Lead Me On (with The Strangers)	
1970	Mother's Favorite Hymns	
1999	The Best of Bonnie Owens	

=== Singles ===
Year	Title	US Country	Album
1963	"Why Don't Daddy Live Here Anymore"	25	Don't Take Advantage of Me
1964	"Don't Take Advantage of Me"	27	Don't Take Advantage of Me
1964	"Just Between the Two of Us" (w/ Merle Haggard)	28	Just Between the Two of Us
1965	"Number One Heel"	41	Don't Take Advantage of Me
1966	"Consider the Children" (with The Strangers)	69	All of Me Belongs to You
1969	"Lead Me On" (with The Strangers)	68	Lead Me On
