= Ken Nelson (American music producer) =

American record producer (1911–2008)

- Born: Kenneth F. Nelson; January 19, 1911; Caledonia, Minnesota, U.S.
- Died: January 6, 2008 (aged 96) Somis, California, U.S.
- Occupation: Record producer
- Years active: 1948–1976

Kenneth F. Nelson (January 19, 1911 – January 6, 2008) was an American record producer and A&R man for Capitol Records.

== Early life ==
Born in Caledonia, Minnesota, Nelson made his radio debut as a singer, at the age of 14, in 1925. and performed in various bands during his teen years, working with musician Lee Gillette several times.

== Career ==
Nelson, who was in charge of the A&R division of Capitol Records and head of country music for many years, is credited for being one of the behind-the-scenes figures responsible for country music's growth during the post-World War II era. During his many years with Capitol's division in Hollywood, California, he produced many of the genre's most notable and successful hits, by artists including Merle Travis, Gene Vincent, Ferlin Husky, Jean Shepard, Hank Thompson and the many Number 1 country hits known as the Bakersfield Sound by Merle Haggard and The Strangers, Buck Owens, Red Simpson and many others.

Nelson was primarily involved with country music acts, although he was responsible for signing comedy star Stan Freberg, who was 25 at the time, with Capitol Records. He produced nearly all of Freberg's comedy recordings during the 1950s, one of the most notable being "St. George and the Dragonet."

According to an extensive chapter on Nelson, Rich Kienzle's book Southwest Shuffle (Routledge, 2003) based on interviews with the producer, Nelson produced the first live album ever done by a country singer, Hank Thompson's Live at the Golden Nugget in 1961.

Nelson was inducted into the Country Music Hall of Fame in 2001. He died at his home in Somis, California, at the age of 96.
