= Norm Hamlet =

American steel guitarist

- Born: Norm Hamlet
- Genres: Country
- Occupation: Steel guitarist
- Instruments: Dobro; Pedal steel guitar
- Years active: 1949–present

Norm Hamlet is an American steel guitarist and a member of Merle Haggard's The Strangers band for the past 49 years.

Hamlet was born on February 27, 1935, in Woodville, California. He began playing guitar in his teens and played throughout North Central California for a number of years with several groups, before going to Bakersfield, California, in 1965 where he became an influential part of the Bakersfield sound. He has won many awards, including induction into the Western Swing Society hall of fame in Sacramento, California, and the Steel Guitar Hall of Fame.

In 2005 Hamlet had quadruple heart bypass surgery and recovered well at his home in Bakersfield, California. As of October 18, 2015, Hamlet continued to tour with Haggard until Haggard's death in April 2016 and is now touring with Haggard's sons, Noel and Ben, as well as pianist Mario Carboni. In addition, he is recording and releasing music with Bakersfield, California, artist, Ernie Lewis. Hamlet plays a GFI pedal steel guitar.
