= Roy Nichols =

Musical artist (1932–2001)

- Roy Nichols

Background information
- Born: Roy Ernest Nichols; October 21, 1932; Chandler, Arizona, U.S.
- Died: July 3, 2001 (aged 68) Bakersfield, California, U.S.
- Genres: Country, western swing, jazz
- Occupations: Musician, songwriter
- Instruments: Guitar, harmonica
- Years active: 1948–1987
- Label: Various

Roy Ernest Nichols (October 21, 1932 – July 3, 2001) was an American country music guitarist best known as the lead guitarist for Merle Haggard's band The Strangers for more than two decades. He was known for his guitar technique, a mix of fingerpicking and pedal steel-like bends, usually played on a Fender Telecaster electric guitar. Nichols is considered one of the founders of the country music subgenre the “Bakersfield Sound”, which includes such notable country artists as Haggard, Buck Owens, and Don Rich.

== Early life ==
Roy Ernest Nichols was born in Chandler, Arizona, to Bruce and Lucille Nichols, as the first born of seven children. The Nichols family moved to Fresno, California, when he was two, where they owned a camp for migrant farm workers. Sometimes a traveling gypsy band would stay at the camp and the young Nichols would hide and watch them play. His father Bruce was also a musician, playing upright bass at local dances on the weekends in the San Joaquin Valley. Nichols was drawn to his father’s music. He learned some basic chords from his father and began playing in his father's band on the weekends when he was only 11. By age 14, Nichols began playing weekends with Curly Roberts and the Rangers; he earned $25 a week.

== Career ==
Shortly before his 16th birthday, Nichols met Fred Maddox, of the Maddox Brothers and Rose, a colorful hillbilly band, who heard Nichols playing guitar on Fresno DJ Barney Lee's Saturday-morning radio program. Nichols, still only 16 years old, was earning $90, a considerable amount at the time. “He could play anything”, remembers Rose Maddox. “He was good at all of it. Every guitar picker in the country wanted to play like him, but none of them ever compared. He was one of a kind, but the music aside, he was like any 16-year-old kid - feisty, causing us trouble. But my mother brought him under.” At a Maddox show in Mesa, Arizona, a teenaged couple sat in the front row: Buck and Bonnie Campbell Owens, who found themselves fascinated with Nichols' playing. The Maddox Brothers toured out of state for extended periods, so Fred Maddox became Nichols' legal guardian while his brother, Henry Maddox, became the young musician's tutor. While in Las Vegas, although warned by Lula Maddox not to do so, Nichols began sneaking away to gamble, an activity that soon led to the guitarist being fired from the group. In his 18 months with the group, Nichols appeared on records for over 100 songs and played almost every evening.

Returning to the valley, Nichols joined Smiley Maxidon on radio station KNGS in Hanford, California, where he performed for a regular one-hour live broadcast. Nichols stayed up all night playing dances several nights a week while still returning to the station to play his 7 am show.

About a year later, the Texas-born, Bakersfield country music icon Lefty Frizzell hired the young guitarist, where future employer Merle Haggard first saw Nichols play 1953 at the Rainbow Gardens. In 1954, Nichols returned to work for another year at the radio station with Maxidon.

In 1955, Nichols joined Cousin Herb Henson's Trading Post Gang's TV show. For five days a week, this 45-minute live country music show was aired on station KERO in Bakersfield, California. Nichols remained there for 5 of the 11 years the show ran. He also played at the Foothill Club in Long Beach with Billy Mize and Cliff Crofford. He also toured with Johnny Cash during that same time.

In 1960, Nichols joined Wynn Stewart in Las Vegas. Merle Haggard was the band's bass player, and this meeting was the beginning of a long collaboration. Ralph Mooney, who played steel guitar in Stewart's band, also later went on to play that instrument on several of Haggard's recordings along with Norm Hamlet. When asked about his experience with Nichols, Mooney explained, “Roy had a resophonic guitar…you know a dobro that he fretted. Nobody could tune it. Roy was so good with his left hand that he bent the strings in tune as he played depending on where he was on the neck.” When asked what it was like recording those sessions, he replied, "It was really a lot of fun!”

On June 15, 1965, Nichols was hired straight out of Stewart's band by Haggard, and flew to Phoenix, Arizona, to join the singer on his first tour with his band The Strangers. Nichols was the first to be hired for Haggard's new band. While Stewart paid the young guitarist $250 a week, Haggard paid substantially less at $125 a week. Nichols gave three conditions for being hired by Haggard: "I don't drive, I carry my own amplifier, and I know where my bed is every night".

Haggard, who said that Nichols, along with guitarist Chet Atkins, "Were the two most influential guitar players in [the last] century", was nothing but effusive when describing his association with Nichols. "Because of Roy, my career commenced", Haggard said. "He was the stylist that set the pace of the records I recorded in my high period."

Over the next two decades, Merle Haggard and The Strangers had 38 hit songs with 33 in the top 10. During his 22 years with Haggard, Nichols wrote and published 19 of his own songs, one of which, “Street Singer”, was recorded by Haggard and was nominated for a Grammy Award in 1970. Nichols continued to tour with Haggard in the United States and overseas with notable performances at Carnegie Hall, Madison Square Gardens, and the White House two times. The Academy of Country and Western Music honored Nichols with nominations for Guitarist of the Year several times, and The Strangers were voted Touring Band of the Year seven times.

== Retirement ==
Nichols retired from the road in March 1987. He was later inducted into the Western Swing Society Hall of Fame in Sacramento, California. Nichols suffered a stroke in February 1996. Losing the use of his left hand as a result, Nichols was no longer able to play guitar.

Nichols was being treated for a nonlife-threatening infection at Mercy Hospital in Bakersfield, California, when he had a heart attack and died on July 3, 2001.
