= Mama's Hungry Eyes: A Tribute to Merle Haggard =

1994 studio album by various artists

Studio album by Various Artists
- Released: October 11, 1994
- Genre: Country
- Length: 50:17
- Label: Arista Nashville
- Producer: Brian Ahern; Alabama; Clint Black; Bruce Bouton; Tony Brown; Don Cook; Steve Fishell; Scott Hendricks; Richard Landis; Kyle Lehning; Monty Powell; Keith Stegall; James Stroud; Pam Tillis

Professional ratings
Review scores
Source	Rating
AllMusic	3/5 stars
Entertainment Weekly	C+

Mama's Hungry Eyes: A Tribute to Merle Haggard is a tribute album to American country music artist Merle Haggard. It was released in 1994 via Arista Nashville. The album peaked at number 52 on the Billboard Top Country Albums chart. Proceeds from the album go to Second Harvest Food Bank.

== Critical reception ==
An uncredited review from AllMusic gave the album three stars out of five, stating that "throughout the album, the listener is constantly reminded of country music's debt to Haggard's songwriting." Alanna Nash of Entertainment Weekly gave it a C+, calling it "often mediocre."

== Track listing ==
All tracks are written by Merle Haggard except "Today I Started Loving You Again" written by Merle Haggard and Bonnie Owens.

No.	Title	Performer(s)	Length
1.	"Tonight the Bottle Let Me Down"	Brooks & Dunn	3:14
2.	"I Take a Lot of Pride in What I Am"	Clint Black	3:33
3.	"Silver Wings"	Pam Tillis	4:22
4.	"Everybody's Had the Blues"	Randy Travis	3:16
5.	"The Farmer's Daughter"	Vince Gill	4:47
6.	"Workin' Man Blues"	Jed Zeppelin (Lee Roy Parnell, Diamond Rio and Steve Wariner)	5:07
7.	"The Running Kind"	Radney Foster	4:23
8.	"Sing Me Back Home"	Alabama	2:43
9.	"Trying Not to Love You"	Alan Jackson	3:49
10.	"I Threw Away the Rose"	Lorrie Morgan	3:24
11.	"Mama Tried"	John Anderson and Marty Stuart	2:53
12.	"Today I Started Loving You Again"	Willie Nelson	3:17
13.	"Mama's Hungry Eyes"	Emmylou Harris	3:38

== Chart performance ==
=== Album ===
Chart (1994)	Peak position
Canadian RPM Country Albums	22
U.S. Billboard Top Country Albums	52

=== Singles ===
Year	Single	Artist	Peak positions
Year	Single	Artist	US Country
1994	"The Running Kind"	Radney Foster	64
1994	"Workin' Man Blues"	Jed Zeppelin	48
