= A Portrait of Merle Haggard =

Studio album by Merle Haggard and the Strangers
- Released: September 2, 1969
- Recorded: June, August, November, December 1968, February, April, May 1969
- Studio: Capitol (Hollywood)
- Genre: Country
- Label: Capitol ST-319
- Producer: Ken Nelson

Merle Haggard and the Strangers chronology
Same Train, a Different Time (1969)	A Portrait of Merle Haggard (1969)	Okie from Muskogee (1970)

Singles from A Portrait of Merle Haggard
- 1. "Hungry Eyes" Released: January 27, 1969; 2. "Workin' Man Blues" Released: June 1969

A Portrait of Merle Haggard is the tenth studio album by American recording artist Merle Haggard and the Strangers, released September 2, 1969.

== History ==
The album contains two number-one country hits, "Hungry Eyes" (sometimes referred to as "Mama's Hungry Eyes") and "Workin' Man Blues". According to The Smithsonian Collection of Classic Country Music, Haggard wrote "Hungry Eyes" as a tribute to his mother and the sacrifices she made for her family as a single mother (Haggard's father having died when he was 9), but it also stands as a tribute to Oklahomans and others who lived in labor camps during the Great Depression, Haggard's way of "commemorating a whole generation of Okies who persisted through persecution and suffering to transplant their culture to California." "Hungry Eyes" is considered by many to be one of Haggard's greatest pieces of songwriting. According to Daniel Cooper's essay for the 1994 Haggard box set Down Every Road, Haggard had been carrying the title around in his head for two years before deciding what to do with it, and the "canvass-covered cabin" referred to in the song is a direct reference to the home of Escar and Willie, the great-uncle and great-aunt with whom he stayed after his father died. In the documentary Beyond Nashville, Haggard explains, "'Mama's Hungry Eyes' was written about a period in America where there were places like labor camps, and the people in these labor camps that weren't ignorant and they weren't a lot of things Steinbeck thought they were." The song would also serve as the title to the 1994 tribute album Mama's Hungry Eyes: A Tribute to Merle Haggard.

The album's other number-one hit is "Workin' Man Blues", referencing blue collar pride, an oft-used subject of Haggard's songwriting. In his 2013 book The Running Kind, David Cantwell praises the contributions of guitarists James Burton and Roy Nichols, as well as session bassist Chuck Berghofer, stating, "Burton and the Strangers had ridden a kindred rocking guitar groove on 1968's 'I'm Bringing Home Good News,' but 'Workin' Man Blues' sets the standard." Lines such as "I ain't never been on welfare, and that's one place I won't be" reinforced Haggard's status as "Poet of the Common Man."

Haggard wrote four of the LP's ten songs himself, including the mournful "Silver Wings" which, much like his earlier composition "Today I Started Loving You Again," was never released as a single but became immensely popular with audiences. A Portrait of Merle Haggard includes four songs penned by Haggard as well as compositions by Willie Nelson, Leon Payne and Hank Cochran.

== Reception ==
Professional ratings
Review scores
Source	Rating
AllMusic	4/5 stars

The album rose to number 3 on the Billboard country albums chart. Mark Deming of AllMusic: "Three of Haggard's finest songs appear on this set—'Silver Wings,' 'Hungry Eyes,' and 'Workin' Man's Blues'—and most country artists would be happy to cut three tunes this strong during the course of their career, let alone as part of one of six albums Hag would release in 1969... The production and arrangements are admirably low-key and to the point, and Haggard's vocals are deeply emotive without overplaying his hand."

== Track listing ==
1. "Workin' Man Blues" (Merle Haggard)
2. "What's Wrong With Stayin' Home" (Bob Morris)
3. "Silver Wings" (Haggard)
4. "Who Do I Know in Dallas" (Hank Cochran, Willie Nelson)
5. "She Thinks I Still Care" (Dickey Lee, Steve Duffy)
6. "Hungry Eyes" (Haggard)
7. "I Die Ten Thousand Times a Day" (Leon Payne)
8. "Every Fool Has a Rainbow" (Haggard)
9. "I Came So Close to Living Alone" (Jimmy Dickens, Ken Hunt)
10. "Montego Bay" (Cochran, Glenn Martin)

== Personnel ==
- Merle Haggard – vocals, guitar

The Strangers:

- Roy Nichols – guitar, harmonica
- Norman Hamlet – steel guitar
- George French – piano
- Jerry Ward – bass
- Eddie Burris – drums

with

- Lewis Talley – guitar
- Tommy Collins – guitar
- Billy Mize – harmony vocals
- Bonnie Owens – harmony vocals

and

- James Burton – guitar, dobro
- Glen D. Hardin – piano
- Bob Morris – bass
- Leon Copeland – bass
- Roy Huskey, Jr. – bass
- Chuck Berghofer – bass
- Jim Gordon – drums

== Chart positions ==
Chart (1970)	Peak position
Billboard Country albums	3
Billboard Pop albums	99
