= Mama Tried (album) =

Studio album by Merle Haggard and the Strangers
- Released: October 3, 1968
- Recorded: February, March, June 1968
- Studio: Capitol (Hollywood)
- Genre: Country; honky-tonk
- Length: 31:57
- Label: Capitol
- Producer: Ken Nelson

Merle Haggard and the Strangers chronology
The Legend of Bonnie & Clyde (1968)	Mama Tried (1968)	Pride in What I Am (1969)

Singles from Mama Tried
- 1. "Mama Tried" Released: July 1968

Mama Tried is the seventh studio album by American country music singer and songwriter Merle Haggard and the Strangers, released on Capitol Records in 1968. It reached number 4 on Billboard's country albums chart. The title song was one of Haggard's biggest hit singles and won the Grammy Hall of Fame Award in 1999.

== Background ==
Haggard had scored four number one hits in the previous two years with prison songs or crime-related themes, including "I'm a Lonesome Fugitive" (1966), "Branded Man" (1967), "Sing Me Back Home" (1967), and "The Legend of Bonnie & Clyde" (1968), and the singer continued his domination of the country charts with the self-penned "Mama Tried," a song in which the narrator laments the pain and suffering he caused his mother by going to prison "despite all my Sunday learnin'..." Along with "Sing Me Back Home" and "Okie from Muskogee," it is probably the song most closely identified with Haggard. The story was partly autobiographical, and the fact that Haggard had actually spent two years in San Quentin gives the song an authenticity that makes the lyric sound all the more heartfelt. "Mama Tried" hit #1 in August 1968 and stayed there for a month. It would also be featured that fall in the Dick Clark production The Killers Three, a film in which Haggard ironically plays a lawman.

Although it isn't necessarily a concept album, Mama Tried is dominated with prison songs, including the Porter Wagoner hit "Green, Green Grass of Home," Johnny Cash's "Folsom Prison Blues," and the Mel Tillis original "I Could Have Gone Right," where Haggard once again pleads his mother's forgiveness. Haggard also recorded the Dolly Parton composition "In the Good Old Days (When Times Were Bad)" several months before Parton cut it herself. As detailed in the liner notes to the 1994 Haggard retrospective Down Every Road, "It was Bonnie (Owens) who brought the song to Merle's attention when the two of them did a short tour with Dolly and Porter Wagoner. Relaxing on Merle's bus one day, the guys were up front playing poker while Dolly and Bonnie hung out in back. 'She sang to me all night long,' Bonnie says, 'songs that she'd written..." As he had on his previous LP The Legend of Bonnie and Clyde, Haggard also included songs written by Dallas Frazier and Leon Payne.

== Reissues ==
- In 1996, Mama Tried was reissued by BGO Records along with I'm a Lonesome Fugitive.
- In 2006, Mama Tried was reissued by Capitol Nashville along with Pride in What I Am with five bonus tracks and 24-bit digital remastering.

== Critical reception ==
Professional ratings
Review scores
Source	Rating
AllMusic	5/5 stars
Pitchfork Media	9.2/10

Mama Tried continued Haggard's artistic and commercial hot streak, reaching number 4 on Billboard's country albums chart. In the original Rolling Stone review, Andy Wickham wrote, "His songs romanticize the hardships and tragedies of America's transient proletarian and his success is resultant of his inherent ability to relate to his audience a commonplace experience with precisely the right emotional pitch...Merle Haggard looks the part and sounds the part because he is the part. He's great." In 2013, Haggard biographer David Cantwell observed that "Mama Tried" had "the potential to reach beyond the country audience that went unrealized, at least in Merle's version, and the whole album has pop ambition unusual for a late-Sixties country release." Stephen Thomas Erlewine of AllMusic wrote: "While 'Mama Tried' stands out among Haggard's original material, 'I'll Always Know' and 'You'll Never Love Me Now' are both solid songs." The song "Mama Tried" won the Grammy Hall of Fame Award in 1999.

== Track listing ==
No.	Title	Writer(s)	Length
1.	"Mama Tried"	Merle Haggard	2:12
2.	"Green, Green Grass of Home"	Curly Putman	3:14
3.	"Little Ole Wine Drinker Me"	Dick Jennings, Hank Mills	2:38
4.	"In the Good Old Days (When Times Were Bad)"	Dolly Parton	2:45
5.	"I Could Have Gone Right"	Mel Tillis	2:33
6.	"I'll Always Know"	Haggard	2:22
7.	"The Sunny Side of My Life"	Haggard	2:11
8.	"Teach Me to Forget"	Leon Payne	2:24
9.	"Folsom Prison Blues"	Johnny Cash	3:15
10.	"Run 'Em Off"	Troy Martin, Onie Wheeler	2:47
11.	"You'll Never Love Me Now"	Haggard	2:51
12.	"Too Many Bridges to Cross Over"	Dallas Frazier	2:45

== Personnel ==
- Merle Haggard – vocals, guitar

The Strangers:

- Roy Nichols – guitar
- Norman Hamlet – steel guitar
- George French – piano
- Jerry Ward – bass
- Eddie Burris – drums

with

- Lewis Talley – guitar
- Tommy Collins – guitar
- Billy Mize – guitar
- Bonnie Owens – harmony vocals

and

- Glen Campbell – guitar
- James Burton – guitar

== Chart positions ==
Year	Chart	Position
1969	Billboard Country albums	4
