= I Take a Lot of Pride in What I Am (album) =

Studio album by Dean Martin
- Released: August 1969
- Recorded: June 11–12, 1969
- Genres: Traditional pop, country
- Length: 31:22
- Label: Reprise – R/RS 6242
- Producer: Jimmy Bowen

Dean Martin chronology
Gentle on My Mind (1969)	I Take a Lot of Pride in What I Am (1969)	My Woman, My Woman, My Wife (1970)

I Take a Lot of Pride in What I Am is the twenty-seventh studio album by Dean Martin arranged by Glen Hardin and Jimmie Haskell.

== Overview ==
Martin recorded very little in 1969, only devoting two three-hour sessions in the spring to recording this album. I Take a Lot of Pride in What I Am peaked at 90 on the Billboard 200.

== Reception ==
Professional ratings
Review scores
Source	Rating
Allmusic	2.5/5 stars

William Ruhlmann on Allmusic.com gave the album two and a half stars out of five. He described the style as "Hollywood-style country-pop" and likened the title track to Roger Miller's "King of the Road," a previous recording of Martin's. The use of similar songs to his previous album, Gentle on My Mind, led Ruhlmann to accuse producer Jimmy Bowen of "just trying to repeat previous successes" with the result "a bit tired...No wonder Martin was taking more interest in his golf game than in his recording activities".

== Track listing ==
1. "I Take a Lot of Pride in What I Am" (Merle Haggard) – 3:17
2. "Make It Rain" (Billy Mize) – 3:29
3. "Where the Blue and Lonely Go" (Marco Verissimo, Bill Silva, Chuck Sagle, Harry Warren) – 3:03
4. "If You Ever Get Around to Loving Me" (Baker Knight) – 3:03
5. "Do You Believe This Town" (Charlie Williams, Joe Nixon) – 2:33
6. "One Cup of Happiness (And One Peace of Mind)" (Baker Knight) – 2:44
7. "The Sun Is Shinin' (On Everybody But Me)" (Chuck Deal, Don Deal) – 2:38
8. "The Sneaky Little Side of Me" (Baker Knight) – 2:45
9. "Crying Time" (Buck Owens) – 3:18
10. "Little Green Apples" (Bobby Russell) – 4:32

== Personnel ==
- Dean Martin – vocals
- Glen Hardin – arranger
- Jimmie Haskell
- Ed Thrasher – art direction, photography
- Jimmy Bowen – producer
