= Branded Man (disambiguation) =

Branded Man is a 1967 album by Merle Haggard and the Strangers. It could also refer to:

- "Branded Man" (song), the second single and title track from the above album
- The Branded Man (1918 film), a short silent Western film starring Hoot Gibson
- The Branded Man (1928 film), a silent crime drama film directed by Scott Pembroke and Phil Rosen
