= Mama Tried =

Mama Tried may refer to:

- Mama Tried (album), a 1968 album by Merle Haggard
  - "Mama Tried" (song), title song from the album
- "Mama Tried", a song by Quasi from their 2003 album Hot Shit!
