= It's All in the Movies =

Studio album by Merle Haggard and The Strangers
- Released: February 1976
- Genre: Country
- Length: 34:01
- Label: Capitol
- Producer: Ken Nelson, Fuzzy Owen

Merle Haggard and The Strangers chronology
Keep Movin' On (1975)	It's All in the Movies (1976)	My Love Affair with Trains (1976)

Singles from It's All in the Movies
- 1. "It's All in the Movies" Released: September 29, 1975

Professional ratings
Review scores
Source	Rating
Allmusic	3/5 stars

It's All in the Movies is the nineteenth studio album by American country music singer Merle Haggard and The Strangers, released in 1976.

== History ==
The album's title track became Haggard's eighth consecutive #1 country single and features the same pop-oriented sound that producer Ken Nelson had employed on the singer's recent chart topper "Always Wanting You." Two songs, "Stingeree" and "Hag's Dixie Blues, No. 2," had been recorded for a 1973 studio album I Love Dixie Blues, a project Haggard scrapped after deciding to record a live album in New Orleans. Haggard also returns to Bob Wills and western swing on "Living With the Shades Pulled Down" and Wills' own "Cotton Patch Blues." The album closes with the Dolly Parton-penned gospel song "The Seeker."

== Reception ==
It's All in the Movies would become Haggard's third consecutive collection to top the Billboard country albums chart. AllMusic: "While the title track is a gentle, affecting ballad, It's All in the Movies doesn't contain enough similarly engaging material to make the record successful. The album is at its best when Haggard delves into western swing, such as 'Living with the Shades Pulled Down,' or when he delivers straightforward ballads like 'Nothing's Worse Than Losing' and 'I Know An Ending When It Comes,' but too many of the songs on the LP are pleasant, but inconsequential, filler."

== Track listing ==
All tracks composed by Merle Haggard; except where indicated

No.	Title	Writer(s)	Length
1.	"It's All in the Movies"		3:15
2.	"Nothing's Worse Than Losing"		2:58
3.	"After Loving You"	Haggard, Ronnie Reno, Leona Williams	3:10
4.	"Stingeree"	Charles Singleton, Larry Coleman	4:03
5.	"I Know an Ending When It Comes"	Hank Cochran	3:10
6.	"This Is the Song We Sing"		2:45
7.	"Living With the Shades Pulled Down"		2:58
8.	"Hag's Dixie Blues, No. 2"		2:50
9.	"Let's Stop Pretending"		3:05
10.	"Cotton Patch Blues"	Bob Wills, Billy Joe Moore	2:57
11.	"The Seeker"	Dolly Parton	2:50

== Personnel ==
- Merle Haggard – vocals, guitar

The Strangers:

- Roy Nichols – lead guitar
- Norman Hamlet – steel guitar, dobro
- Tiny Moore – mandolin
- Eldon Shamblin – guitar
- Ronnie Reno – guitar
- Mark Yeary – piano
- James Tittle – bass
- Biff Adam – drums
- Don Markham – saxophone

with

- Bobby Wayne – guitar
- Marcia Nichols – guitar
- Dave Kirby – guitar
- Dennis Hromek – bass
- Johnny Gimble – fiddle
- Bonnie Owens – harmony vocals

and

- Hargus "Pig" Robbins – piano, organ
- Glen D. Hardin – piano
- Chuck Berghofer – bass
- Bob Moore – bass
- Joseph Zinkan – bass
- Bill Puett – horns

== Chart positions ==
Year	Chart	Position
1976	Billboard Country albums	1
