= Herb Henson =

American country music performer and television personality (1925–1963)

Herbert Lester Henson (May 17, 1925 – November 26, 1963), known as Cousin Herb, was an American country music performer and television host on KERO-TV, channel 10 (now 23) in Bakersfield, California. He is the first cousin once removed of musician Jeff Tweedy.

Despite releasing only a small clutch of recordings, Cousin Herb Henson was a pivotal figure in the development of country music's Bakersfield sound—his weekday television variety program, The Trading Post, was a showcase for acts including Buck Owens, Spade Cooley and Merle Haggard, the latter dubbing Henson "the Ralph Emery of Bakersfield."

== Biography ==
Born in East St. Louis, Illinois on May 17, 1925, Henson was a self-taught pianist and sometimes comedian who arrived in California via Union Pacific railcar sometime in the mid-1940s. After picking cotton in the fields of the San Joaquin Valley, he landed a job making door-to-door laundry pickups for a company operating out of the Fresno area.

Bandleader Bill Woods convinced Henson to relocate to Bakersfield in 1946, where he worked at local radio station KERO and occasionally performed at area honky tonks such as the now-legendary Clover Club and the Blackboard. In mid-1953, KERO-TV offered him his own weekday broadcast, and The Cousin Herb Henson Trading Post TV Show premiered in September, appearing each afternoon from 5:00 p.m. to 5:45 p.m.

Originally co-starring Woods, Billy Mize, and members of the Clover Club house band (including Buck Owens' estranged wife Bonnie), the program's cast would later boast such ace musicians as Roy Nichols, and Dallas Frazier, and its guest stars included Gene Autry, Bob Wills, Johnny Cash, Tex Ritter, Tennessee Ernie Ford, Merle Travis, and Lefty Frizzell.

During the program's run, Henson recorded for labels including Tally, Shasta, and Decca, producing his strongest material for Capitol, most notably a 1953 reading of Arlie Duff's "Y'All Come" that became his theme song. Many of his other singles were novelty efforts – e.g., "Hootchy Kootchy Henry", "Board of Education", and "Space Command" – and none troubled the charts. When Bakersfield radio station KIKK appointed Henson station manager in 1960, he changed its call letters to KUZZ in honor of his own stage moniker. Around this same time, he suffered a heart attack but continued both his television and radio duties as well as his nightclub appearances.

On September 12, 1963, some two dozen country stars (among them Tommy Collins and Roy Clark) descended upon the Bakersfield Civic Center to celebrate The Trading Post′s tenth anniversary; just two months later, on November 26, Henson suffered another massive heart attack, dying at the age of 38.
