= Same Train, a Different Time =

Same Train, A Different Time

Studio album by Merle Haggard
- Released: May 1, 1969
- Recorded: August 26, 1968 – February 26, 1969
- Studio: Capitol (Hollywood)
- Genre: Country
- Length: 65:11
- Label: Capitol
- Producer: Ken Nelson

Merle Haggard chronology
Pride in What I Am (1969)	Same Train, A Different Time (1969)	A Portrait of Merle Haggard (1969)

Same Train, A Different Time (subtitled Merle Haggard Sings the Great Songs of Jimmie Rodgers) is the ninth studio album by American country music artist Merle Haggard backed by the Strangers, released in 1969, featuring covers of songs by legendary country music songwriter Jimmie Rodgers. It was originally released as a 2 LP set on Capitol (SWBB-223).

== History ==
After producing a string of albums and No. 1 chart hits, Haggard decided to record a tribute album to Jimmie Rodgers, who, along with Lefty Frizzell and Bob Wills, was one of his favorite artists. Haggard had already recorded a couple of Rodgers songs, having included the Blue Yodeler's "Rough and Rowdy Ways" on his 1967 LP I'm a Lonesome Fugitive while the same version of "California Blues" on this album had been featured on Pride in What I Am three months earlier. Same Train, A Different Time includes several spoken word introductions by Haggard where he talks about the life and songs of the legendary country singer.

In 1990 it became the first of Merle Haggard's Capitol albums to be re-released on CD when it was reissued by EMI-Toshiba in Japan in its entire original repertoire.

== Reception ==
Professional ratings
Review scores
Source	Rating
AllMusic	5/5 stars

The album was released May 1, 1969, and topped the Billboard country albums chart without the benefit of a hit single. AllMusic critic Stephen Thomas Erlewine stated in his review: "While the album is rooted in the past, the key to its success is how Haggard updates these traditional songs without losing sight of their roots. There are contemporary folk, country and blues influences scattered throughout the record, adding depth to the music and proving that Rodgers' music is indeed timeless."

== Track listing ==
All tracks written by Jimmie Rodgers unless otherwise noted.

1. "California Blues"
2. "Narration #1"
3. "Hobo's Meditation"
4. "Waitin' For a Train"
5. "Mother, The Queen of My Heart" (Rodgers, Hoyt Bryant)
6. "My Carolina Sunshine Girl"
7. "Narration #2"
8. "Train Whistle Blues"
9. "Why Should I Be Lonely?" (Rodgers, Estelle Lovell)
10. "Jimmie's Texas Blues"
11. "Blue Yodel#6" (Rodgers, George Vaughan)
12. "Narration #3"
13. "Mule Skinner Blues"
14. "Peach Picking Time Down in Georgia" (Rodgers, Clayton McMichen)
15. "Down the Old Road To Home" (Rodgers, Carey D. Harvey)
16. "Travelin' Blues" (Rodgers, Shelly Lee Alley)
17. "Miss the Mississippi And You" (Bill Halley)
18. "Frankie and Johnny"
19. "No Hard Times"
20. "Narration #4"
21. "Hobo Bill's Last Ride" (Waldo LaFayette O'Neal)
22. "My Old Pal" (Rodgers, Elsie McWilliams)
23. "Nobody Knows But Me" (Rodgers, McWilliams)
24. "Narration #5"
25. "Jimmie Rodgers' Last Blue Yodel (The Women Make a Fool Out of Me)"

== Personnel ==
- Merle Haggard – vocals, guitar

The Strangers:

- Roy Nichols – guitar, harmonica
- Norman Hamlet – steel guitar
- George French – piano
- Jerry Ward – bass
- Eddie Burris – drums

with

- Lewis Talley – guitar
- Billy Mize – harmony vocals
- Bonnie Owens – harmony vocals

and

- James Burton – guitar, dobro
- Bob Morris – bass
- Roy Huskey, Jr. – bass
