= Keep Movin' On =

Studio album by Merle Haggard and The Strangers
- Released: April 1975
- Recorded: March, June, September and November 1974
- Studio: Columbia (Nashville, Tennessee); Jack Clement Recording (Nashville, Tennessee)
- Genre: Country
- Label: Capitol
- Producer: Ken Nelson, Fuzzy Owen

Merle Haggard and The Strangers chronology
| Merle Haggard Presents His 30th Album (1974) | Keep Movin' On (1975) | It's All in the Movies (1976) |

Singles from Keep Movin' On
- 1. "Kentucky Gambler" Released: October 1974; 2. "Always Wanting You" Released: February 3, 1975; 3. "Movin' On" Released: May 12, 1975

Keep Movin' On is the eighteenth studio album by American country music singer Merle Haggard and The Strangers released in 1975. It reached number one on the Billboard country albums chart. "Movin' On" was a full-length version of a song Haggard recorded as the theme song to the TV series Movin' On.

== History ==
Keep Movin' On would be one of Haggard's most commercially successful albums, containing three #1 hits. The first of these, "Kentucky Gambler," had been written by fellow country star Dolly Parton (she also provides background vocals on Haggard's version). It stayed at number one for a single week and spent a total of eleven weeks on the chart. Haggard had first recorded one of Parton's compositions, "In the Good Old Days (When Things Were Bad)" on his 1968 album Mama Tried.

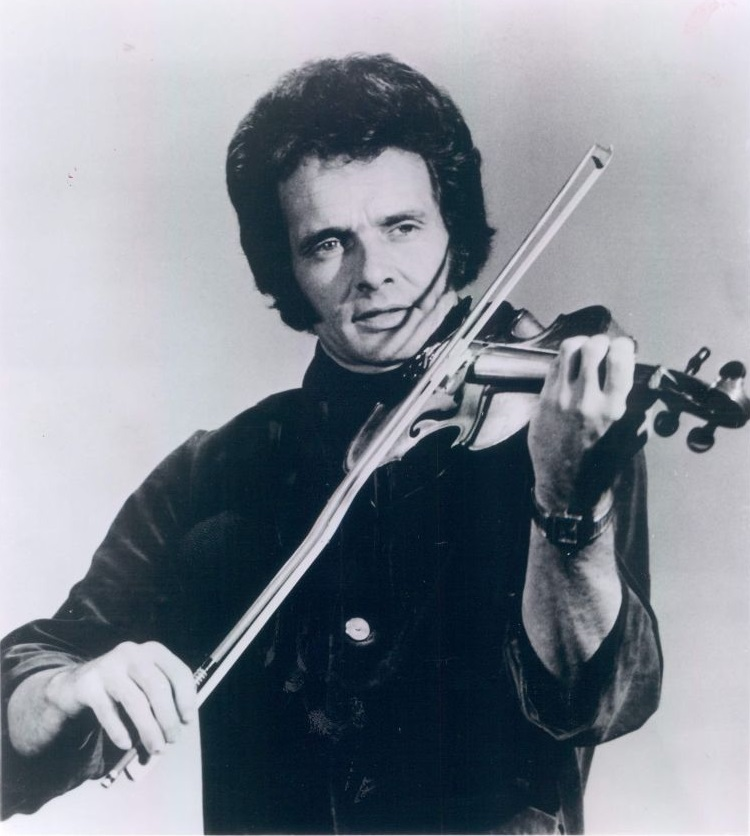
Haggard in 1975

"Always Wanting You" followed "Kentucky Gambler" to the top of the Billboard country singles chart, adorned with an almost easy listening pop sound that producer Ken Nelson also employs on several of the album's other tracks. The sweetened sound that Nelson employed on Haggard's final Capitol LPs followed the fashionable countrypolitan sound that was dominating country radio in the mid-seventies.

The final #1 song from the album was its title track, which was the full-length version of a song that Haggard had recorded as the theme song to the TV series Movin' On starring Claude Akins and Frank Converse, which ran for two seasons on NBC. "Movin' On" became Haggard's seventh consecutive #1 hit and thirteenth since 1970.

Another song from the album is "Life’s like Poetry", which Haggard wrote for his friend Lefty Frizzell, who was trying to make a comeback. Frizzell recorded the song in January 1975, and his version peaked at No. 67 on the Billboard country charts, and was to be Frizzell's second-to-last single to hit the charts (before "Falling"); Frizzell would suffer from a stroke and die in July that year.

== Critical reception ==
Professional ratings
Review scores
| Source | Rating |
|---|---|
| AllMusic | 3/5 stars |

Mark Deming of AllMusic states that, while the album is "not a masterpiece," it is worth a listen. "If the arrangements and production are noticeably more tricked up than the minimal perfection of Haggard's 1960s sides and these lyrics aren't his sharpest meditations on the male/female relationship, for the most part Keep Movin' On finds Hag in worthy form, and 'Always Wanting You,' 'A Man's Got to Give Up a Lot,' and 'September in Miami' are memorable if lesser-known numbers."

== Track listing ==
All songs by Merle Haggard unless otherwise noted:

1. "Movin' On"
2. "Life's Like Poetry"
3. "I've Got a Darlin' (For a Wife)" (Merle Haggard, Ronnie Reno)
4. "These Mem'ries We're Making Tonight"
5. "You'll Always Be Special"
6. "September in Miami"
7. "Always Wanting You"
8. "Kentucky Gambler" (Dolly Parton)
9. "Here in Frisco"
10. "I've Got a Yearning"
11. "A Man's Gotta Give Up a Lot"

== Personnel ==
- Merle Haggard – vocals, guitar

The Strangers:

- Roy Nichols – lead guitar
- Norman Hamlet – steel guitar, dobro
- Tiny Moore – mandolin
- Ronnie Reno – guitar
- Mark Yeary – piano
- Johnny Meeks – bass
- Biff Adam – drums
- Don Markham – saxophone

with

- Dave Kirby – guitar
- James Tittle – bass
- Johnny Gimble – fiddle

and

- Dolly Parton – background vocals on "Kentucky Gambler"
- Hargus "Pig" Robbins – piano, organ
- Chuck Berghofer – bass
- Bob Moore – bass
- Bill Puett – horns

== Charts ==
=== Weekly charts ===
| Chart (1975) | Peak position |
|---|---|
| US Billboard 200 | 129 |
| US Top Country Albums (Billboard) | 1 |

=== Year-end charts ===
| Chart (1975) | Position |
|---|---|
| US Top Country Albums (Billboard) | 8 |
