= I Threw Away the Rose =

Single by Merle Haggard and The Strangers

from the album Branded Man
- B-side: "Loneliness Is Eating Me Alive"
- Released: February 27, 1967
- Genre: Country
- Length: 3:21
- Label: Capitol
- Songwriter(s): Merle Haggard
- Producer(s): Ken Nelson

Merle Haggard and The Strangers singles chronology
"The Fugitive" (1966)	"I Threw Away the Rose" (1967)	"Branded Man" (1967)

"I Threw Away the Rose" is a song written and recorded by American country music artist Merle Haggard and The Strangers. It was released in February 1967 as the first single from the album Branded Man. The song peaked at number two on the U.S. Billboard Hot Country Singles. In 1994 Lorrie Morgan recorded a version of the song which replaced the "I" in the lyrics with "you", changing it from a self-referential song to a song about someone else, for the Merle Haggard tribute album Mama's Hungry Eyes: A Tribute to Merle Haggard.

== Personnel ==
- Merle Haggard– vocals, guitar

The Strangers:

- Roy Nichols – guitar
- Ralph Mooney – steel guitar
- George French – piano
- Jerry Ward – bass
- Eddie Burris – drums

== Chart performance ==
Chart (1967)	Peak position
US Hot Country Songs (Billboard)	2
