= The Day the Rains Came =

The Day the Rains Came may refer to:

== Songs ==
- "The Day the Rains Came" (song), 1958 song by Jane Morgan
- "The Day the Rains Came", a 1969 song by Merle Haggard from Pride in What I Am

== Film ==
- The Day the Rains Came (film), a 1959 West German film
