= Pride in What I Am =

Studio album by Merle Haggard and The Strangers
- Released: February 3, 1969
- Recorded: June and August 1968
- Studio: Capitol (Hollywood)
- Genre: Country
- Label: Capitol ST-168
- Producer: Ken Nelson

Merle Haggard and The Strangers chronology
Mama Tried (1968)	Pride in What I Am (1969)	Same Train, a Different Time (1969)

Singles from Pride in What I Am
- 1. "I Take a Lot of Pride in What I Am" Released: October 14, 1968

Pride in What I Am is the eighth studio album by American country music artist Merle Haggard and The Strangers released in 1969 on Capitol Records.

== Recording and composition ==
After scoring four number-one hits in a row, the single "I Take a Lot of Pride in What I Am" peaked at number 3 on the Billboard country singles chart. The song is a first person narration by a homeless drifter who laments his lonely, rootless existence but at the same time celebrates "living off the side of our great land..." as he defiantly proclaims, "Things I learned in a hobo jungle are things they never taught me in a classroom." Aside from the jaunty "I'm Bringing Home Good News," the album is largely a stripped down affair with arrangements and instrumentation that reveal a pop and folk music influence, such as on the title track. Pride in What I Am also showcases Haggard's affection for the blues on the comically self-loathing "I Can't Hold Myself In Line" and the Jimmie Rodgers classic "California Blues (Blue Yodel #4)" (Haggard's next studio album would be a tribute to Rodgers, released three months after this one).

Haggard was beginning to attract attention from artists outside the country field, such as crooner Dean Martin, who recorded "I Take a Lot of Pride in What I Am" for his album of the same name in 1969. In addition, the Gram Parsons incarnation of the Byrds had performed "Sing Me Back Home" on the Grand Ole Opry and had recorded Haggard's "Life in Prison" for their album Sweetheart of the Rodeo the same year. Part of Haggard's strong appeal during this period was the high quality and of his albums in an industry that saw the LP as a dumping ground for leftover studio cuts and a cash cow for music publishing companies. As Daniel Cooper notes in his essay for the 1994 retrospective Down Every Road, "...at a time when country albums were notorious for consisting of two or three hit singles and a load of filler, Haggard, in the same amount of studio time, would produce LPs consisting of two or three #1 smashes and a series of album tracks any one of which would have been someone else's career record."

== Reception ==
Professional ratings
Review scores
Source	Rating
AllMusic	4/5 stars
Pitchfork Media	link
Rolling Stone	Not rated link

Pride In What I Am peaked at number 11 on the Billboard country albums chart and remains a critical favorite. Stephen Thomas Erlewine of AllMusic states that the collection "gains considerable strength from a diversity of material, where the rolling, folk-tinged sound epitomized by the title song is balanced by twangy, spare country and bits of hard honky tonk, blues..." In the book Merle Haggard: The Running Kind, David Cantwell calls it "an album that stands with Haggard's best," calling "The Day the Rains Came" "wondrous, weird, and lovely."

== Reissues ==
In 2002, Pride in What I Am was reissued by BGO Records along with The Legend of Bonnie and Clyde. In 2006, Pride in What I Am was reissued by Capitol Nashville along with Mama Tried with five bonus tracks and 24-bit digital remastering.

== Track listing ==
All songs by Merle Haggard unless otherwise noted.

1. "I Take a Lot of Pride in What I Am"
2. "Who'll Buy the Wine" (Billy Mize)
3. "The Day the Rains Came"
4. "It Meant Goodbye to Me (When You Said Hello to Him)" (Lefty Frizzell, Abe Mulkey)
5. "I Can't Hold Myself in Line"
6. "I'm Bringin' Home Good News"
7. "Keep Me from Cryin' Today"
8. "I Just Want to Look at You One More Time"
9. "Somewhere on Skid Row" (Red Simpson)
10. "I'm Free" (Leon Copeland)
11. "California Blues (Blue Yodel No. 4)" (Jimmie Rodgers)
12. "I Think We're Livin' in the Good Old Days" (Dean Holloway, Simpson)

== Personnel ==
- Merle Haggard – vocals, guitar

The Strangers:

- Roy Nichols – guitar, harmonica
- Norman Hamlet – steel guitar
- George French – piano
- Jerry Ward – bass
- Eddie Burris – drums

with

- Lewis Talley – guitar
- Bonnie Owens – harmony vocals

and

- James Burton – guitar
- Bob Morris – bass
- Leon Copeland – bass
- Roy Huskey, Jr. – bass

== Chart positions ==
Chart (1969)	Peak position
Billboard Country albums	11
Billboard Pop albums	189
