= I Take a Lot of Pride in What I Am =

1968 country song

Single by Merle Haggard and The Strangers

from the album Pride in What I Am
- B-side: "Keep Me from Crying Today"
- Released: October 14, 1968
- Genre: Country
- Length: 2:47
- Label: Capitol
- Songwriter(s): Merle Haggard
- Producer(s): Ken Nelson

Merle Haggard and The Strangers singles chronology
"Mama Tried" (1968)	"I Take a Lot of Pride in What I Am" (1968)	"Hungry Eyes" (1969)

"I Take a Lot of Pride in What I Am"

Single by Dean Martin

from the album I Take a Lot of Pride in What I Am
- B-side: Drowning In My Tears
- Released: 1969
- Genre: Country Pop
- Label: Reprise
- Producer(s): Jimmy Bowen

Dean Martin singles chronology
"Gentle On My Mind" (1968)	"I Take a Lot of Pride in What I Am" (1969)	"One Cup of Happiness (and One Piece of Mind)" (1969)

"I Take a Lot of Pride in What I Am" is a song written and recorded by American country music artist Merle Haggard and The Strangers. It was released in October 1968 as the only single from his album Pride in What I Am. The song peaked at number three on the U.S. Billboard Hot Country Singles chart. It reached number-one on the Canadian RPM Country Tracks in January 1969.

== Personnel ==
- Merle Haggard– vocals, guitar

The Strangers:

- Roy Nichols – guitar, harmonica
- Norman Hamlet – steel guitar
- George French – piano
- Jerry Ward – bass
- Eddie Burris – drums

== Meaning ==
The song is about a poor train-hopping transient, who as the title suggests, celebrates his outcast identity, perseverance and freedom.

== Dean Martin version and background ==
Dean Martin came back to the charts in 1964 with his hit Everybody Loves Somebody, and continued to do well on the charts ever since, with multiple Easy Listening Number ones. By 1969 his comeback cooled down, and that year he recorded "I Take a Lot of Pride in What I Am", which did better than his previous single "Gentle On My Mind", reaching No. 75 on the Billboard Hot 100 and No. 15 on the Easy Listening chart. It also did very well in Canada, reaching No. 62 there and No. 3 on Canadian RPM Adult Contemporary. After his next single, "One Cup of Happiness (and One Piece of Mind)" did well on the charts too, he recorded his only album that year, I Take a Lot of Pride in What I Am, which included both songs.

== Other versions ==
- A tape recorder version of this song was played at the funeral of late Lynyrd Skynyrd vocalist, Ronnie Van Zant.
- Jerry Butler recorded a version too that year, it did modestly in Canada.

== Chart performance ==
Merle Haggard

Chart (1968–1969)	Peak position
US Hot Country Songs (Billboard)	3
Canadian RPM Country Tracks	1

Dean Martin

Chart (1969)	Peak position
US Billboard Hot 100	75
US Adult Contemporary (Billboard)	15
Canadian RPM Top Singles	62
Canadian RPM Adult Contemporary	3
Australian Top Singles	88

Jerry Butler

Chart (1969)	Peak position
Canadian RPM Top Singles	86
