= It's All in the Movies (song) =

Single by Merle Haggard and The Strangers

from the album It's All in the Movies
- B-side: "Living with the Shades Pulled Down"
- Released: September 29, 1975
- Recorded: 1975
- Genre: Country
- Length: 3:15
- Label: Capitol
- Songwriter(s): Merle Haggard
- Producer(s): Ken Nelson and Fuzzy Owen

Merle Haggard and The Strangers singles chronology
"Movin' On" (1975)	"It's All in the Movies" (1975)	"The Roots of My Raising" (1976)

"It's All in the Movies' is a song written and recorded by American country music artist Merle Haggard and The Strangers. It was released in September 1975 as the first single and title track from the album It's All in the Movies. The song was Merle Haggard and The Strangers twenty-second number one single on the country chart. The single stayed at number one for a single week and spent a total of thirteen weeks on the country chart.

== Personnel ==
- Merle Haggard– vocals, guitar

The Strangers:

- Roy Nichols – lead guitar
- Norman Hamlet – steel guitar, dobro
- Tiny Moore – mandolin
- Eldon Shamblin– guitar
- Ronnie Reno – guitar
- Mark Yeary – piano
- James Tittle – bass
- Biff Adam – drums
- Don Markham – saxophone

== Chart positions ==
Chart (1975)	Peak position
US Hot Country Songs (Billboard)	1
Canadian RPM Country Tracks	11
