= Movin' On (Merle Haggard song) =

Single by Merle Haggard and The Strangers

from the album Keep Movin' On
- B-side: "Here in Frisco"
- Released: May 12, 1975
- Recorded: 1975
- Genre: Country, truck-driving country
- Length: 2:16
- Label: Capitol 3746
- Songwriter: Merle Haggard
- Producer: Fuzzy Owen

Merle Haggard and The Strangers singles chronology
"Always Wanting You" (1975)	"Movin' On" (1975)	"It's All in the Movies" (1975)

"Movin' On" is a song written and recorded by American country music singer Merle Haggard and The Strangers. It was released in May 1975 as the third single and partial title track from the album Keep Movin' On. Originally, it was the theme song to the 1974-1976 NBC-TV series of the same name and references the lead characters of the series, Sonny Pruitt and Will Chandler, by name. A full-length version of the song was released as a single in 1975, and it topped the Billboard Hot Country Singles chart that July.

In addition to serving as the main theme to Movin' On, the song was among many in country music to pay homage to the American over-the-road truck driver. It should not be confused with the country standard "I'm Moving On" by Hank Snow.

== Charts ==
=== Weekly charts ===
Chart (1975)	Peak position
US Hot Country Songs (Billboard)	1
Canadian RPM Country Tracks	15

=== Year-end charts ===
Chart (1975)	Position
US Hot Country Songs (Billboard)	36

== Personnel ==
- Merle Haggard– vocals, guitar

The Strangers:

- Roy Nichols – lead guitar
- Norman Hamlet – steel guitar, dobro
- Tiny Moore – mandolin
- Ronnie Reno – guitar
- Mark Yeary – piano
- Johnny Meeks - bass
- Biff Adam – drums
- Don Markham – saxophone

== Sources ==
- Roland, Tom, The Billboard Book of Number One Country Hits (Billboard Books, Watson-Guptill Publications, New York, 1991 (ISBN 0-82-307553-2)
