= Sing Me Back Home (song) =

Single by Merle Haggard and The Strangers

from the album Sing Me Back Home
- B-side: "Good Times"
- Released: November 1967
- Genre: Country
- Length: 2:51
- Label: Capitol
- Songwriter: Merle Haggard
- Producer: Ken Nelson

Merle Haggard and The Strangers singles chronology
"Branded Man" (1967)	"Sing Me Back Home" (1967)	"The Legend of Bonnie and Clyde" (1968)

"Sing Me Back Home" is a song written and recorded by American country music artist Merle Haggard and The Strangers. It was released in November 1967 as the first single and title track from the album Sing Me Back Home. The song was Merle Haggard and The Strangers third number one. The single spent two weeks at number one and a total of 17 weeks on the country chart. In 2019, Rolling Stone ranked "Sing Me Back Home" No. 32 on its list of the 40 Saddest Country Songs of All Time.

== Content ==
The song was among several notable Haggard songs that touched on a common theme of his 1960s and early 1970s recordings—prison. Haggard himself spent three years at San Quentin State Prison in California for his role in a botched robbery.

"Sing Me Back Home" draws upon Haggard's relationships with two fellow inmates: Caryl Chessman, the "first modern American executed for a non-lethal kidnapping"; and James "Rabbit" Kendrick, who was executed in 1961 for killing a California Highway Patrolman after escaping from prison.

Here, the singer takes the role of an inmate at a state penitentiary, where a condemned prisoner is being led toward the death chamber. The inmate, who regularly plays guitar and sings in his jail cell to pass the time, is asked to perform a final song at the condemned prisoner's request before he and the guards continue on. As the song is completed, he reflects on a church choir's visit to the prison just a week earlier, where members performed hymns for the inmates; one of the songs evoked the soon-to-be-executed prisoner's memories of his mother and carefree childhood ... before his life went wrong.

== Cover versions ==
The Everly Brothers recorded a version of the song for their 1968 album Roots along with another Haggard song, "Mama Tried".

Joan Baez recorded the song, along with another Haggard song, "Mama Tried", in 1969, during sessions for her (I Live) One Day at a Time album, though neither song was included on the final album; they would eventually be released on her 1993 boxed set Rare, Live & Classic.

The Flying Burrito Brothers recorded a version with Gram Parsons singing that never appeared on a studio album but was included in the 1974 compilation, Close up the Honky Tonks. A 1969 live recording by the Byrds, was released on the 2006 box set, There Is a Season.

The Grateful Dead performed the song 38 times in concert between 1971 and 1973.

Alabama recorded their version of the song for a 1994 tribute album titled Mama's Hungry Eyes: A Tribute to Merle Haggard. Prior to recording the song, it was also the first song that Alabama performed on the stage together at a high school talent contest for which they won the first prize and tickets to the Grand Ole Opry.

Marianne Faithfull recorded the song as a collaboration with Keith Richards for her 2008 album Easy Come, Easy Go.

Don Williams performed the song on his 2014 album, Reflections.

Richard Shindell performed the song on his 1997 album Reunion Hill. It is not in the track listing, but it appears in full after a pause at the end of the album's last track ("I'll Be Here in the Morning").

Billy Ray Cyrus performed his version of the song on his 1996 album Trail of Tears.

== Chart performance ==
Chart (1967–1968)	Peak position
US Hot Country Songs (Billboard)	1
Canadian RPM Country Tracks	7
