= The Legend of Bonnie and Clyde (song) =

Single by Merle Haggard and The Strangers

from the album The Legend of Bonnie & Clyde
- B-side: "Today I Started Loving You Again"
- Released: February 1968
- Recorded: January 31, 1968 ("The Legend of Bonnie and Clyde"); February 1, 1968 ("Today I Started Loving You Again")
- Studio: Capitol (Hollywood, California)
- Genre: Country
- Length: 2:06 ("The Legend of Bonnie and Clyde"); 2:20 ("Today I Started Loving You Again")
- Label: Capitol
- Songwriters: Merle Haggard; Bonnie Owens
- Producer: Ken Nelson

Merle Haggard and The Strangers singles chronology
"Sing Me Back Home" (1967)	"The Legend of Bonnie and Clyde" (1968)	"Mama Tried" (1968)

"The Legend of Bonnie and Clyde'" is a song written by American country music artists Merle Haggard and Bonnie Owens, and recorded by Haggard and The Strangers. It was released in January 1968 as the first single and title track from the album The Legend of Bonnie and Clyde. The song was Haggard and The Strangers' fourth No.1 on the U.S. country singles chart. The single spent two weeks at number one and a total of 14 weeks on the country chart.

== Content ==
The song is a condensed biography of the famed outlaw duo Bonnie Parker and Clyde Barrow, starting from the time they met to their violent death in an ambush.

== B-side ==
The B-side of the single was "Today I Started Loving You Again." A ballad composed by Haggard and Bonnie Owens, the song neither charted on its own as a single nor was listed as a flip-side "tag-along" hit. Nonetheless, "Today I Started Loving You Again" became one of Haggard's most popular songs and would be a staple of classic country music radio stations' playlists.

== Chart performance ==
Released in February 1968, The Legend of Bonnie and Clyde was Merle Haggard's fourth No.1 song on the Billboard magazine Hot Country Singles chart in April. The song spent two weeks at No.1.

Chart (1968)	Peak position
US Hot Country Songs (Billboard)	1
Canadian RPM Country Tracks	3

== Covers ==
The song has been covered by a number of other artists, including Glen Campbell, Tammy Wynette, David Allan Coe and bluegrass group Fast Track.
