= Gentle on My Mind (Dean Martin album) =

1968 studio album by Dean Martin

Studio album by Dean Martin
- Released: November 1968
- Genres: Country, pop
- Length: 28:27
- Label: Reprise
- Producer: Jimmy Bowen

Dean Martin chronology
Welcome to My World (1967)	Gentle on My Mind (1968)	I Take a Lot of Pride In What I Am (1969)

Gentle on My Mind is the twenty-fifth studio album by Dean Martin, produced by Jimmy Bowen and arranged by Ernie Freeman, and released in November 1968 on the Reprise label. The album peaked at #14 in the US and #9 in the UK. In the latter country, the title track became a major pop hit, reaching #2 in March 1969.

Professional ratings
Review scores
Source	Rating
Allmusic	link

== Track listing ==
1. "Not Enough Indians" (Baker Knight) 3:25
2. "That Old Time Feelin'" (Baker Knight) 2:43
3. "Honey" (Bobby Russell) 3:58
4. "Welcome to My Heart" (Bert Kaempfert, Lee Pockriss, Herbert Rehbein, Paul Vance) 2:23
5. "By the Time I Get to Phoenix" (Jimmy Webb) 2:45
6. "Gentle on My Mind" (John Hartford) 2:17
7. "That's When I See the Blues (In Your Pretty Brown Eyes)" (Carl Belew, Tommy Blake, W.S. Stevenson) 2:37
8. "Rainbows Are Back in Style" (Dave Burgess) 3:04
9. "Drowning in My Tears" (Ken Lane, Irving Taylor) 2:25
10. "April Again" (Glen Hardin) 2:50

== Chart performance ==
Chart (1968)	Peak position
US Billboard Top LPs	14
UK Albums Chart	9
