= Branded Man =

Studio album by Merle Haggard and the Strangers
- Released: August 28, 1967
- Recorded: August 1966–1967
- Studio: Capitol (Hollywood)
- Genre: Country
- Length: 32:29
- Label: Capitol
- Producer: Ken Nelson

Merle Haggard and the Strangers chronology
I'm a Lonesome Fugitive (1967)	Branded Man (1967)	Sing Me Back Home (1968)

Singles from Branded Man
- 1. "I Threw Away the Rose" Released: February 1967; 2. "Branded Man" Released: June 1967

Branded Man is the fourth studio album by American country music singer Merle Haggard and the Strangers. It was released on Capitol Records in 1967.

== Background ==
After a troubled youth that saw him in and out of youth reformatories, Haggard was finally sent to Bakersfield jail for a bungled robbery and, after an escape attempt, transferred to San Quentin prison on February 21, 1958. He was released in 1960. By 1967, he was on the cusp of country stardom when he hit number one on the country singles chart with the Liz Anderson composition "I'm A Lonesome Fugitive." Understandably, Haggard was concerned about the effect his time in prison might have on his career but, as Daniel Cooper writes in the liner notes to the 1994 box set Down Every Road, it had little effect at all: "It's unclear when or where Merle first acknowledged to the public that his prison songs were rooted in personal history, for to his credit, he doesn't seem to have made some big splash announcement. In a May 1967 profile in Music City News, his prison record is never mentioned. But in July 1968, in the very same publication, it's spoken of as if it were common knowledge." Haggard would be legally pardoned for his past crimes by California's Governor Ronald Reagan in 1971.

== Recording and composition ==
The single "Branded Man" hit number one on the US country music charts in 1967, the first of four straight number ones Haggard would score in the next two years. The song is a little reminiscent of an old Roy Acuff song called "Branded Wherever I Go," which producer Ken Nelson had recorded with the Louvin Brothers in 1962. Branded Man kicked off an incredible artistic run for Haggard; in 2013 Haggard biographer David Cantwell states, "The immediate successors to I'm a Lonesome Fugitive - Branded Man in 1967 and, in '68, Sing Me Back Home and The Legend of Bonnie and Clyde - were among the finest albums of their respective years." Haggard wrote or co-wrote seven of the album's twelve tracks, which feature many of the same session players who appeared on his previous two albums, including guitarists James Burton and Glen Campbell, and steel guitarist Ralph Mooney. Also contributing were The Strangers guitarist Roy Nichols and Bonnie Owens. Owens co-wrote two of the album selections with Haggard, while Bakersfield pioneer and Haggard mentor Tommy Collins had a hand in writing four songs.

Ken Nelson took a hands-off approach to producing Haggard. In the episode of American Masters dedicated to him, Haggard remembers: "The producer I had at that time, Ken Nelson, was an exception to the rule. He called me 'Mr. Haggard' and I was a little twenty-four, twenty-five year old punk from Oildale...He gave me complete responsibility. I think if he'd jumped in and said, 'Oh, you can't do that,' it would've destroyed me." In the same documentary, Dave Alvin marvels, "There's a purity to those records. A couple of acoustic guitars, a couple of electric guitars, and Merle's voice. And bass and drums. Those are just pure, those are timeless." In the documentary Beyond Nashville, Nelson recalls, "When I first started recording Merle, I became so enamored with his singing that I would forget what else was going on, and I suddenly realized, 'Wait a minute, there's musicians here you've got to worry about!' But his songs - he was a great writer."

The follow-up to "Branded Man" was the Haggard-penned "I Threw Away the Rose," which rose to number 2, and it was this song that brought Haggard to the attention of George Jones. In his 1981 autobiography Merle Haggard: Sing Me Back Home, Haggard recalls playing somewhere in Texas when someone handed him a phone saying Jones was on the line. Jones slurred his appreciation for the song and said he was coming to see him immediately. "It wasn't hard to see that ol' George was pretty wasted," Haggard wrote. "I hung up the phone and some of the others in the room said they wouldn't be surprised if he showed up. I told them I didn't think so, 'cause hell, he was supposed to be doing concerts all week." The next day Jones arrived, kicking the door in and eventually folding up the roll-away bed that Haggard's sleeping manager Fuzzy Owen was on and wheeling it out of the room. Jones would record "I Threw Away the Rose" himself, as well as several other Haggard compositions over the course of his career, and the pair would record two duet albums together.

== Critical reception ==
Professional ratings
Review scores
Source	Rating
AllMusic	4/5 stars
Pitchfork Media	8.4/10

Branded Man topped the Billboard country albums chart. Stephen Thomas Erlewine of AllMusic wrote "Like Swinging Doors before it, Branded Man... is merely a collection of songs pieced together to cash in on a couple of hit singles. Nevertheless, the intent of an album such as this doesn't really matter when the songs are this fine." In 2003, the album was ranked number 484 on Rolling Stone's list of the 500 greatest albums.

== Track listing ==
No.	Title	Writer(s)	Length
1.	"Branded Man"	Merle Haggard	3:07
2.	"Loneliness Is Eating Me Alive"	Hank Cochran	2:35
3.	"Don't Get Married"	Tommy Collins	2:30
4.	"Somewhere Between"	Bonnie Owens, Haggard	3:06
5.	"You Don't Have Very Far to Go"	Haggard, Red Simpson	2:19
6.	"Gone Crazy"	Bonnie Owens, Haggard	2:03
7.	"I Threw Away the Rose"	Haggard	3:21
8.	"My Hands Are Tied"	Collins, Haggard, Kay Adams	2:18
9.	"Some of Us Never Learn"	Haggard	2:41
10.	"Long Black Limousine"	Vern Stovall, Bobby George	3:14
11.	"Go Home"	Collins	2:35
12.	"I Made the Prison Band"	Collins	2:29

== Personnel ==
- Merle Haggard – vocals, guitar

The Strangers:

- Roy Nichols – guitar
- Ralph Mooney – steel guitar
- George French – piano
- Jerry Ward – bass
- Eddie Burris – drums

with

- Lewis Talley – guitar
- Billy Mize – guitar
- Tommy Collins – guitar
- Bonnie Owens – harmony vocals

and

- James Burton – guitar
- Glen Campbell – guitar
- Shorty Mullins – guitar
- Glen D. Hardin – piano
- Leon Copeland – bass
- Jim Gordon – drums
