= The Legend of Bonnie & Clyde =

Studio album by Merle Haggard and the Strangers
- Released: April 8, 1968
- Recorded: September 1967, January–February 1968
- Studio: Capitol (Hollywood)
- Genre: Country
- Length: 28:45
- Label: Capitol
- Producer: Ken Nelson

Merle Haggard and the Strangers chronology
Sing Me Back Home (1968)	The Legend of Bonnie & Clyde (1968)	Mama Tried (1968)

Singles from The Legend of Bonnie & Clyde
- 1. "The Legend of Bonnie and Clyde" Released: February 1968

The Legend of Bonnie & Clyde is the sixth studio album by American country music artist Merle Haggard and the Strangers released on Capitol Records in 1968. It rose to number 6 on the Billboard country albums chart.

== Background ==
The title track to this album became Haggard's third consecutive number one country single, but it was its B-side, "I Started Loving You Again" (the "Today" was added to the title later), that became a standard and his most covered song. In the book Merle Haggard: The Running Kind, David Cantwell discusses the song's impact, noting that between 1968 and 1975 alone "at least sixty recordings of the song were released. There have been pushing that many again in the decades since, and that's without counting the times it's been performed on television through the years, or during mega-star arena shows and don't-forget-to-tip-your-waitress bar sets, or the just-for-fun semipro and amateur versions YouTube lists into the thousands." Singer Bonnie Owens, Haggard's then-wife and band member, played a crucial role in the song's creation. In the episode of CMT's Inside Fame that was dedicated to Haggard's career, Owens remembers that Merle "thought he was out of love with me and wanted out..." Haggard picks up the story, remembering that they were walking through an airport: "I looked at this woman, and she was gorgeous, an absolutely gorgeous lady, and I said, 'You know what? I think I started lovin' you again today.' And she said, 'Turn that around.' And I said, 'Turn what around?' 'Today I started lovin' you again.' I said, 'That gives you half of it.' A few days later Haggard wrote the song alone in a motel room in Dallas. In the same episode of Inside Fame, an emotional Haggard chokes up remembering the first time he played it for her, adding, "Some things are hard to tell."

Owens also co-wrote the album's title track, which was inspired by the 1967 Arthur Penn film Bonnie and Clyde. The song is one of the few Haggard hits from this period to not feature James Burton on guitar, but Glen Campbell, who was about to crack the pop charts with "By the Time I Get to Phoenix" and plays banjo on Haggard's track. The album contains only two songs composed solely by Haggard, with the singer relying on country songwriter Dallas Frazier for three songs and also recording selections by old friends Tommy Collins and Wynn Stewart. "Money Tree" was originally recorded by Haggard's hero Lefty Frizzell.

The Legend of Bonnie & Clyde was reissued by BGO Records along with Pride in What I Am in 2002.

== Critical reception ==
Professional ratings
Review scores
Source	Rating
AllMusic	4/5 stars
Pitchfork Media	8.8/10

Stephen Thomas Erlewine of AllMusic admires the "unconventional" covers that Haggard chose to record, but states that "they're all overshadowed by 'I Started Loving You Again,' the timeless ballad Haggard co-wrote with Bonnie Owens that stands as one of his greatest moments. Its presence along with the terrific title track and Haggard & the Strangers' restless but quiet musical exploration make The Legend of Bonnie & Clyde another typically excellent album from Hag, who was on a hell of a hot streak late in the '60s, which this simply continues."

== Track listing ==
No.	Title	Writer(s)	Length
1.	"The Legend of Bonnie and Clyde"	Merle Haggard, Bonnie Owens	2:04
2.	"Is This the Beginning of the End?"	Wally Lewis, Billy Mize, Wynn Stewart	3:03
3.	"Love Has a Mind of Its Own"	Dallas Frazier	2:22
4.	"The Train Never Stops (At Our Town)"	Frazier	2:01
5.	"Fool's Castle"	Tommy Collins	2:46
6.	"Will You Visit Me on Sundays?"	Frazier	2:50
7.	"My Ramona"	Haggard	3:00
8.	"I Started Loving You Again"	Haggard, Bonnie Owens	2:20
9.	"Money Tree"	Wayne Walker	2:47
10.	"You've Still Got a Place in My Heart"	Leon Payne	2:30
11.	"Because You Can't Be Mine"	Haggard	2:42

== Personnel ==
- Merle Haggard – vocals, guitar

The Strangers:

- Roy Nichols – guitar
- Norman Hamlet – steel guitar
- George French – piano
- Jerry Ward – bass
- Eddie Burris – drums

with

- Lewis Talley – guitar
- Billy Mize – guitar
- Bonnie Owens – harmony vocals

and

- Glen Campbell – guitar, banjo

== Chart positions ==
Chart (1968)	Peak position
Billboard Country albums	6
