= Workin' Man Blues =

Single by Merle Haggard and The Strangers

from the album A Portrait of Merle Haggard
- B-side: "Silver Wings"
- Released: June 30, 1969
- Recorded: May 16, 1969
- Genre: Country
- Length: 2:33
- Label: Capitol 2503
- Songwriter: Merle Haggard
- Producer: Ken Nelson

Merle Haggard and The Strangers singles chronology
"Hungry Eyes" (1968)	"Workin' Man Blues" (1969)	"Okie from Muskogee" (1969)

"Workin' Man Blues" is a song written and recorded by American country music artist Merle Haggard and The Strangers. It was released in May 1969 as the second single from the album A Portrait of Merle Haggard. The song was released during his early peak and became one of several signature songs during his career.

== Background ==
"Workin' Man Blues" is Haggard's tribute to a core group of his fans: The American blue-collared working man. Backed by a strong electric guitar beat that typified Haggard's signature Bakersfield Sound, he fills the role of one of those workers expressing pride in values such as hard work and sacrifice, despite the resulting fatigue and the stress of raising a large family. He admits to relaxing during the off-working hours ("I drink my beer in a tavern, sing a little bit of these workin' man's blues.") and vows that as a result of keeping his values, he will never need to go on welfare ("... cause I'll be working, long as my two hands are fit to use.").

"Workin' Man Blues" was a track on Haggard's 1969 album A Portrait of Merle Haggard. Music critic Mark Deming noted that the song was among three of Haggard's finest songs to appear on the album; "Silver Wings" and "Hungry Eyes" were the other two. "(M)ost country artists would be happy to cut three tunes this strong during the course of their career, let alone as part of one of six albums Hag would release in 1969," wrote Deming.

== Chart performance ==
"Workin' Man Blues" was released in July 1969, and reached No. 1 on the Billboard magazine Hot Country Singles chart.

Chart (1969)	Peak position
US Hot Country Songs (Billboard)	1
Canadian RPM Country Tracks	1

== Cover versions and other songs ==
Jerry Lee Lewis included a cover on the 1970 album She Even Woke Me Up to Say Goodbye.

The New Riders of the Purple Sage have frequently covered the song since 1970.

Lone Justice included a live cover on the 1983 'best of' album This World Is Not My Home.

Jon Wayne included a cover on the 1985 album Texas Funeral.

Gary Morris's cover was released in September 1990 as the first single from the album These Days.

Diamond Rio, along with guitarists Steve Wariner and Lee Roy Parnell, recorded a cover of the song in 1994, crediting themselves as Jed Zeppelin. This cover, included on a tribute album called Mama's Hungry Eyes: A Tribute to Merle Haggard, charted at number 48 on the Billboard country charts, and a music video was made for it.

Willie Nelson recorded the song on his 2025 album Workin' Man: Willie Sings Merle.

== In popular culture ==
The song was featured in the Simpsons episode, "Lost Verizon" while Bart collects golf balls at a country club for money.
