= Not Enough Indians =

Single by Dean Martin

from the album Gentle On My Mind
- B-side: "Rainbows Are Back In Style"
- Released: October 1968
- Genre: Traditional pop, country pop
- Length: 3:25
- Label: Reprise
- Songwriter: Baker Knight
- Producer: Jimmy Bowen

"Not Enough Indians" is a song written by Baker Knight, which was released in 1968 by Dean Martin. The song spent 9 weeks on the Billboard Hot 100 chart, peaking at No. 43, while reaching No. 4 on Billboard's Easy Listening chart, No. 49 on Canada's RPM 100, and No. 18 on Australia's Go-Set National Top 40.

== Chart performance ==
Chart (1968–1969)	Peak position
Australia - Go-Set	18
Canada - RPM 100	49
South Africa (Springbok)	8
US Billboard Hot 100	43
US Billboard Easy Listening	4
