= Kentucky Gambler =

Single by Merle Haggard and The Strangers

from the album Keep Movin' On
- B-side: "You'll Always Be Special"
- Released: October 1974
- Genre: Country
- Length: 2:42
- Label: Capitol
- Songwriter(s): Dolly Parton
- Producer(s): Ken Nelson; Fuzzy Owen

Merle Haggard and The Strangers singles chronology
"Old Man from the Mountain" (1974)	"Kentucky Gambler" (1974)	"Always Wanting You" (1975)

"Kentucky Gambler" is a 1974 song written and performed by Dolly Parton. "Kentucky Gambler" was issued as a track from Dolly Parton's The Bargain Store album from 1975.

== Content ==
A classic Dolly Parton story song, "Kentucky Gambler" tells the story of a miner from Kentucky who abandons his wife and children for the bright lights of Reno, where he initially does very well at gambling, "winning at everything he played". Eventually, however, his winning streak comes to a halt, as he loses all of his winnings. Broke, he returns home, only to find that his wife has found someone else and has moved on without him. He concludes that "a gambler loses much more than he wins".

== Merle Haggard recording ==
That same year, Merle Haggard and The Strangers covered "Kentucky Gambler" and it was their nineteenth number one song on the country chart. The Merle Haggard and The Strangers version stayed at number one for a single week and spent a total of eleven weeks on the chart.

Coincidentally, Parton's The Bargain Store album featured a cover of a Haggard composition, "You'll Always Be Special to Me". The following year, Haggard would cover another Dolly Parton song, "The Seeker".

== Personnel for Merle Haggard version ==
- Merle Haggard– vocals, guitar

The Strangers:

- Roy Nichols – lead guitar
- Norman Hamlet – steel guitar, dobro
- Tiny Moore – mandolin
- Ronnie Reno – guitar
- Mark Yeary – piano
- Johnny Meeks - bass
- Biff Adam – drums
- Don Markham – saxophone

== Charts ==
=== Weekly charts ===
Chart (1974–1975)	Peak position
US Hot Country Songs (Billboard)	1
Canadian RPM Country Tracks	1

=== Year-end charts ===
Chart (1975)	Position
US Hot Country Songs (Billboard)	29
