= Mama Tried (song) =

1968 single by Merle Haggard

Single by Merle Haggard and the Strangers

from the album Mama Tried
- B-side: "You'll Never Love Me Now"
- Released: July 22, 1968
- Recorded: May 9, 1968
- Genre: Country
- Length: 2:12
- Label: Capitol
- Songwriter: Merle Haggard
- Producer: Ken Nelson

Merle Haggard and the Strangers singles chronology
| "The Legend of Bonnie and Clyde" (1968) | "Mama Tried" (1968) | "I Take a Lot of Pride in What I Am" (1968) |

"Mama Tried" is a song written and recorded by American country music artist Merle Haggard and the Strangers. It was released in July 1968 as the first single and title track from the album Mama Tried. The song became one of the cornerstone songs of his career. It won the Grammy Hall of Fame Award in 1999, and was selected for preservation in the National Recording Registry due to its "cultural, historic, or artistic significance" on March 23, 2016, just 14 days before Haggard's death. In 2021, it was ranked at number 376 on Rolling Stone's "500 Greatest Songs of All Time". In June 2026, CBS News included the song in its list of the 250 essential American songs of the past 250 years.

== Background ==
In "Mama Tried", Haggard focuses on the pain and suffering he caused his own mother by being incarcerated in 1957 in San Quentin. Haggard ultimately served three years on a robbery conviction.

However, the song is not literally autobiographical, as many country music historians point out. While writer Bill Malone's assessment of the song is in agreement with Ace Collins' (referring to his own experiences that had him sentenced to prison), Malone points out that Haggard never was sentenced to "life without parole", as the protagonist in the song was. Still, the song's lyrics and the protagonist's experiences are heavily influenced by Haggard's early life.

Additionally, Allmusic writer Bill Janovitz notes Haggard's lyrics are sympathetic to his mother, who tried everything in her power to rehabilitate her rebel son. As the lyrics point out, though, "In spite of all my Sunday learning, towards the bad I kept on turning/'Til mama couldn't hold me anymore"; thus the observation, "I turned 21 in prison doin' life without parole."

Malone notes that "Mama Tried" "recalls for us the 1960s California honky tonk and the Merle Haggard sound of those years, featuring the searing electric guitar of Roy Nichols."

== Chart performance ==
Released in July 1968, Mama Tried was Merle Haggard and the Strangers' fifth number-one song on the Billboard Hot Country Singles chart in August. The song spent four weeks at number one and was his biggest hit to that time.

| Chart (1968) | Peak position |
|---|---|
| U.S. Billboard Hot Country Singles | 1 |
| Canadian RPM Country Tracks | 1 |

== In popular culture ==
Haggard's version of "Mama Tried" was on the soundtrack of the 1968 film Killers Three, a film that featured his acting debut.

Tracy Newman's 2008 song "The Man at Table Nine" references the song "Mama Tried" and an encounter with its author.

The words "Mama Tried"—referring to the song—are shown on Miranda Lambert's shirt in several scenes of the music video Kerosene.

In the 1997 documentary about the making of the film From Dusk till Dawn, known as Full Tilt Boogie, Quentin Tarantino can be seen singing the song with others while on the set.

In the fifth-season finale of Gilmore Girls ("A House is Not a Home", 2005), Stars Hollow's "Town Troubadour" is singing the song on a streetcorner soon after Lorelai brings Rory home from a night in jail.

In the 2008 film The Strangers, the song is used to build tension while also referencing the potential poor upbringing of the films' antagonists. Haggard's own band was also called the Strangers.

In the second series of the 2008 UK television series Survivors, the song is often played and sung by truckdriver Billy Stringer.

In 2010, the song was sung as a plot element by Nate Moretta (Kevin Alejandro) to a young incarcerated Hispanic gang member on TNT's Southland season-two premiere, "Phase Three".

In April 2018, it was used in Fear the Walking Dead, season four, episode two, and again in November 2023 in the series finale.

The song was referenced by Riley Green in his song "I Wish Grandpas Never Died."

The song was referenced in the chorus of Hardy's song "Redneck Tendencies" featuring Trace Adkins and the late Joe Diffie.

== Cover versions ==
The Grateful Dead covered the song regularly, playing it over 300 times live throughout their career, including at Woodstock.

The Everly Brothers covered the song on their 1968 album Roots.

Joan Baez covered the song in 1969, along with another Haggard song, "Sing Me Back Home", though her versions of both songs went unreleased until they were included on her 1993 boxed set Rare, Live & Classic; they later appeared on the 2005 reissue of her 1970 album (I Live) One Day at a Time.

David Allan Coe covered it in several compilation albums, including Truckin' Outlaw and 20 Greatest Hits.

The song has been a live standard for Texas alt-country band Old 97's for their entire career and was recorded for their debut album.

American Oi! band Forced Reality covered the song. It appears on their Unheard, Unreleased, and Under the Boot compilation.

The Seldom Scene covered the song on their 2007 Sugar Hill Records release, SCENEchronized.

Comedian Neil Hamburger recorded and released a version on his 2014 LP First of Dismay.

A demonstration recording of "Mama Tried" was recorded by Jim Croce. It was released in his 2003 compilation Home Recordings: Americana.

Other recorded versions include:

- Blues man Albert Lee
- Commander Cody of Commander Cody and His Lost Planet Airmen
- Conway Twitty
- Johnny Cash with Merle Haggard and Willie Nelson
- Marty Stuart with John Anderson
- Merle Haggard with Buck Owens and Willie Nelson
- Merle Haggard with Conway Twitty
- Merle Haggard with Ray Price and Willie Nelson
- Merle Haggard with Roger Miller and Bill Anderson
- Merle Haggard with Willie Nelson and Waylon Jennings
- Percy Sledge
- Randy Travis
- Reba McEntire
- The Buckaroos
- The Nitty Gritty Dirt Band
- Toby Keith with Merle Haggard and Willie Nelson
- Troy Cassar-Daley with Adam Harvey
- Willie Nelson
- The Dirty Nil
- Reina del Cid
- Clive Gregson and Christine Collister
- Eli "Paperboy" Reed
- 2021 - John Greene, Crying Time Again

== See also ==
- "Momma's Waiting"
