= Hungry Eyes (Merle Haggard song) =

Single by Merle Haggard and the Strangers

from the album A Portrait of Merle Haggard
- B-side: "California Blues"
- Released: February 17, 1969
- Recorded: December 9, 1968
- Genre: Country
- Length: 3:29
- Label: Capitol 2383
- Songwriter: Merle Haggard
- Producer: Ken Nelson

Merle Haggard and the Strangers singles chronology
"I Take a Lot of Pride in What I Am" (1968)	"Hungry Eyes" (1969)	"Workin' Man Blues" (1969)

"Hungry Eyes" is a song written and recorded by American country music artist Merle Haggard and the Strangers. It was released in February 1969 as the first single from the album A Portrait of Merle Haggard. The song was one of the most popular of his career.

== Background ==
During the late 1960s, Haggard released a series of recordings many critics have deemed to be not only some of his greatest works, but some of the most significant in the history of country music. "Hungry Eyes" — sometimes known as "Mama's Hungry Eyes" — is one of those recordings.

According to genre historian Bill Malone, Haggard wrote the song as a tribute to his mother and the sacrifices she made for her family as a single mother (Haggard's father having died when he was 9). The song itself is not autobiographical, Malone noted, as the Haggard family never lived in a labor camp.

However, "Hungry Eyes" is a tribute to Oklahomans and others who lived in labor camps during the Great Depression, the time period in which this song is set. "(I)t is Haggard's way of commemorating a whole generation of Okies who persisted through persecution and suffering to transplant their culture to California," Malone wrote.

"Hungry Eyes", whose somber tone underscored the hope-filled despair of its main subject, Mama, was a track on Haggard's 1969 album A Portrait of Merle Haggard. Music critic Mark Deming noted that the song was among three of Haggard's finest songs to appear on the album; "Silver Wings" and "Workin' Man's Blues" were the other two. "(M)ost country artists would be happy to cut three tunes this strong during the course of their career, let alone as part of one of six albums Hag would release in 1969," wrote Deming.

== Chart performance ==
"Hungry Eyes" was released in February 1969, and reached number one on the Billboard Hot Country Singles chart.

Chart (1969)	Peak position
US Hot Country Songs (Billboard)	1
Canadian RPM Country Tracks	2
