= Branded Man (song) =

Single by Merle Haggard and The Strangers

from the album Branded Man
- B-side: "You Don't Have Very Far to Go"
- Released: June 12, 1967
- Genre: Country
- Length: 3:07
- Label: Capitol
- Songwriter(s): Merle Haggard
- Producer(s): Ken Nelson

Merle Haggard and The Strangers singles chronology
"I Threw Away the Rose" (1967)	"Branded Man" (1967)	"Sing Me Back Home" (1967)

"Branded Man" is a song written and recorded by American country music artist Merle Haggard and The Strangers. It was released in June 12th 1967 as the second single and title track from the album Branded Man. The song was Haggard and The Strangers second number one on the country charts. The single stayed at number one for a single week and spent 15 weeks on the chart.

== Content ==
The song is about an ex-convict's fear of not being accepted by the outside world after being paroled.

== Personnel ==
- Merle Haggard– vocals, guitar

The Strangers:

- Roy Nichols – guitar
- Ralph Mooney – steel guitar
- George French – piano
- Jerry Ward – bass
- Eddie Burris – drums

== Chart performance ==
Chart (1967)	Peak position
US Hot Country Songs (Billboard)	1
