= Always Wanting You =

Single by Merle Haggard and The Strangers

from the album Keep Movin' On
- B-side: "I've Got a Yearning"
- Released: February 3, 1975
- Genre: Country
- Length: 3:09
- Label: Capitol
- Songwriter: Merle Haggard
- Producers: Ken Nelson; Fuzzy Owen

Merle Haggard and The Strangers singles chronology
"Kentucky Gambler" (1974)	"Always Wanting You" (1975)	"Movin' On" (1975)

"Always Wanting You" is a song written and recorded by American country music artist Merle Haggard and The Strangers. It was released in February 1975 as the second single from the album Keep Movin' On. The song was Haggard and The Strangers twentieth number-one single on the U.S. country chart. It stayed at number one for two weeks and spent a total of ten weeks on the chart.

== Content ==
"Always Wanting You" was written for Dolly Parton, because Haggard fell in love with her while recording her song "Kentucky Gambler" but knew they could not be together as both were married to others. Haggard and Parton had toured together during 1974–1975. Haggard expressed his desires for a more intimate relationship on several occasions, but Parton insisted throughout that it could never work (she was married, but he was between wives at the time). After Haggard wrote "Always Wanting You", he sang it to Parton over the phone in the early hours of the morning, hoping it would impress her enough to give in; she declined. Haggard wrote about his experiences in his book Sing Me Back Home: My Own Story; he was not embarrassed about it, nor did Parton claim to be.

"Always Wanting You" reached the pinnacle of Billboard's Hot Country Singles chart on April 12, 1975, and was strong enough to remain in that position for two weeks. It was Haggard's sixth number one single in a row, and the 20th of his eventual 38 chart-toppers, the third most in history.

== Personnel ==
- Merle Haggard– vocals, guitar

The Strangers:

- Roy Nichols – lead guitar
- Norman Hamlet – steel guitar, dobro
- Tiny Moore – mandolin
- Ronnie Reno – guitar
- Mark Yeary – piano
- Johnny Meeks - bass
- Biff Adam – drums
- Don Markham – saxophone

== Charts ==
=== Weekly charts ===
Chart (1975)	Peak position
US Hot Country Songs (Billboard)	1
Canadian RPM Country Tracks	3

=== Year-end charts ===
Chart (1975)	Position
US Hot Country Songs (Billboard)	23

== Popular culture ==
The song is featured in the video game Grand Theft Auto: San Andreas.
