= Sing Me Back Home =

Studio album by Merle Haggard and the Strangers
- Released: January 2, 1968
- Recorded: April, July, September, November 1967
- Studio: Capitol (Hollywood)
- Genre: Country
- Length: 30:13
- Label: Capitol
- Producer: Ken Nelson

Merle Haggard and the Strangers chronology
Branded Man (1967)	Sing Me Back Home (1968)	The Legend of Bonnie & Clyde (1968)

Singles from Sing Me Back Home
- 1. "Sing Me Back Home" Released: October 23, 1967

Sing Me Back Home is the fifth studio album by American country singer and songwriter Merle Haggard and the Strangers, released in 1968 on Capitol Records.

== Background ==
The album's title track was inspired by an inmate Haggard knew while he was serving time in San Quentin named Jimmy "Rabbit" Kendrick. As recounted in his 1981 autobiography Merle Haggard: Sing Me Back Home, Rabbit devised a brilliant escape and invited Haggard to join him, but they both agreed it would be best that he stay put. Rabbit was captured two weeks later and eventually executed for the murder of a state trooper. Haggard, the "guitar playing friend", wrote the song as a tribute. Writing in the liner notes for the 1994 retrospective Down Every Road, Daniel Cooper calls it, "a ballad that works on so many different levels of the soul it defies one's every attempt to analyze it." In a 1977 interview in Billboard with Bob Eubanks, Haggard reflected, "Even though the crime was brutal and the guy was an incorrigible criminal, it's a feeling you never forget when you see someone you know make that last walk. They bring him through the yard, and there's a guard in front and a guard behind - that's how you know a death prisoner. They brought Rabbit out...taking him to see the Father,...prior to his execution. That was a strong picture that was left in my mind." The track topped the country singles chart a few weeks into 1968 (his second number one in a row) and he performed it as a duet with Johnny Cash on the latter's network television show in 1969. In his 1999 autobiography House of Memories, Haggard states that the song had been published by Blue Book Music, a company owned by Buck Owens, and when Haggard asked Owens for a sum of money to pay back debts incurred in Las Vegas, Owens agreed only if he received half of “Sing Me Back Home,” to which Haggard agreed. Haggard, who later felt he had been taken, sued to get his ownership of the song back.

Although Haggard wrote or co-wrote most of the tracks on Sing Me Back Home, the song credits also list several important figures from his musical past, such as Lefty Frizzell, who wrote "Mom and Dad's Waltz" and was arguably Merle's biggest musical inspiration. In addition, a young Haggard had played behind both Buck Owens and Wynn Stewart during his time on the Bakersfield club scene, and the album features compositions by both. In fact, Haggard wrote "Home Is Where a Kid Grows Up" with Stewart and another one of his idols, Bob Wills (Haggard would cut a tribute album in honor of Wills in 1970).

While many country LPs during this period were often haphazardly assembled collections of studio cuts and cover songs to support a hit single or two, the quality of Haggard's albums during this period were remarkably high. In his 2013 biography Merle Haggard: The Running Kind, David Cantwell gives part of the credit to producer Ken Nelson: "Nelson wasn't a musician himself, and he wasn't a knob-twirling auteur, either...Nelson had an ear for talent and material and for sounds...He was an old school A&R man, and he had the role's key skill: he could hear pop." Another key ingredient in Haggard's sound during this period was the guitar blend of James Burton and Roy Nichols. As Haggard explained to Downbeat in 1980, "James was doing this thing called 'chicken pickin'. But he wasn't really bending the strings. Roy, on the other hand, was doing the string bending but wasn't doing the chicken' pickin'... Our guitar style came out of a marriage between the styles."

== Critical reception ==
Professional ratings
Review scores
Source	Rating
AllMusic	4.5/5 stars
Pitchfork Media	8.8/10

Sing Me Back Home was released on January 2, 1968, and became Haggard's second straight number-one album. At the time of the album's release, Life stated that the title track "could be a Top 40 hit tomorrow if the big-city stations would play it." Stephen Thomas Erlewine of AllMusic writes: "Sing Me Back Home follows the blueprint of Merle Haggard's first three albums, balancing a hit single with album tracks and a couple of covers, but there is a difference. Where the previous album Branded Man was a transitional album, hinting that Haggard's talents were deepening substantially, Sing Me Back Home is the result of the flowering of his talent."

== Track listing ==
All tracks composed by Merle Haggard; except where indicated

No.	Title	Writer(s)	Length
1.	"Sing Me Back Home"		2:51
2.	"Look Over Me"		2:58
3.	"The Son of Hickory Holler's Tramp"	Dallas Frazier	3:00
4.	"Wine Take Me Away"	Tommy Collins, Haggard	2:48
5.	"If You See My Baby"	Eddie Miller, Bob Morris	2:32
6.	"Where Does the Good Times Go"	Buck Owens	2:06
7.	"I'll Leave the Bottle on the Bar"		2:41
8.	"My Past Is Present"	Haggard, Wynn Stewart	1:58
9.	"Home Is Where a Kid Grows Up"		1:57
10.	"Mom and Dad's Waltz"	Lefty Frizzell	2:27
11.	"Good Times"		2:59
12.	"Seeing Eye Dog"		2:41

== Personnel ==
- Merle Haggard – vocals, guitar

The Strangers:

- Roy Nichols – guitar
- Norman Hamlet – steel guitar
- George French – piano
- Jerry Ward – bass
- Eddie Burris – drums

with

- Lewis Talley – guitar
- Billy Mize – guitar
- Bonnie Owens – harmony vocals

and

- Glen Campbell – guitar

== Charts ==
Chart (1968)	Peak position
Billboard Country LPs	1
