= Today I Started Loving You Again =

1968 song written by Merle Haggard and Bonnie Owens

Single by Merle Haggard and The Strangers

from the album The Legend of Bonnie & Clyde
- A-side: "The Legend of Bonnie and Clyde"
- Released: February 26, 1968
- Genre: country
- Length: 2:20
- Label: Capitol
- Songwriters: Merle Haggard, Bonnie Owens

"Today I Started Loving You Again" is a 1968 song written by Merle Haggard and Bonnie Owens. Haggard first recorded it as a B-side to his number 1 hit, "The Legend of Bonnie and Clyde", but it failed to chart. It also appears on his 1968 album, The Legend of Bonnie & Clyde. The song was later recorded by Al Martino in 1969, followed by many other artists, including Waylon Jennings 1968, Conway Twitty 1968, Marty Robbins 1968, Gene Summers 1980, Charlie McCoy 1972, David Peters, Jerry Lee Lewis 1968, Kenny Rogers and the First Edition 1972, Bettye Swann 1969, Connie Smith 1969, Barbara Mandrell 1974, Sammi Smith 1975, Bobby Bland 1975, Emmylou Harris 1986, Skeeter Davis 1970 and Dolly Parton 1996. More recently it was recorded by Jeff Carson and Merle Haggard for Carson's 1997 album, Butterfly Kisses.

== Chart peaks ==
=== Al Martino ===
Chart (1969)	Peak position
US Billboard Hot 100 Singles	86
US Billboard Adult Contemporary	19
US Billboard Hot Country Singles	69
Canada RPM Top Tracks	44
Canada RPM Adult Contemporary	21

=== Charlie McCoy ===
Chart (1972)	Peak position
US Billboard Hot Country Singles	16
Canada RPM Country Singles	13

=== David Peters ===
Chart (1973)	Peak position
Canada RPM Country Singles	75
Canada RPM Adult Contemporary	83

=== Kenny Rogers and the First Edition ===
Chart (1973)	Peak position
US Billboard Hot Country Singles	69

=== Bettye Swann ===
Chart (1975)	Peak position
US Billboard Hot 100 Singles	46
US Billboard R&B Singles	26

=== Sammi Smith ===
Chart (1975)	Peak position
US Billboard Hot Country Singles	9

=== Bobby Bland ===
Chart (1976)	Peak position
US Billboard Bubbling Under-Hot Singles	3
US Billboard R&B Singles	34

=== Emmylou Harris ===
Chart (1986)	Peak position
US Billboard Hot Country Singles	43
Canada RPM Country Singles	49
