= Andy Wickham =

English music producer (1947–2022)

Andrew Wickham (9 May 1947 – 29 March 2022) was a British native who became prominent in the U.S. music business as a producer, A&R director, and talent scout in the 1960s, 1970s and 1980s.

== Professional rise ==
Wickham had worked as a commercial artist in London, and was employed at Andrew Loog Oldham's Immediate Records label before moving to Los Angeles to work for Lou Adler's Dunhill label. He met Warner Bros. Records executive Mo Ostin at the Monterey International Pop Festival in 1967, and was hired as the label's "company freak" to scout new talent and forge a bond between rebellious young artists and established Warner Bros. executives.

In 1975, he was assigned to oversee the establishment of Warner's Country Music division in Nashville.

== Artists signed ==
As an executive at Warner Bros./Reprise, Wickham signed Joni Mitchell, Eric Andersen, Jethro Tull, Van Morrison, Gram Parsons, Emmylou Harris, Buck Owens, Guy Clark, A-HA and others to recording contracts.

== Production work ==
Wickham produced recordings by The Everly Brothers, Phil Ochs, Doug Kershaw, The Mighty Sparrow, Nancy Sinatra, Goldie Hawn, Van Dyke Parks, Steve Young, and many others. He also wrote liner notes for many albums.

== Legacy ==
Warner Executive Stan Cornyn recalled working at the label in the late 1960s. "At one point," he said, "I was the hippest person at Warner Bros. Records. My hair was slightly longer than the others’, and my attitude was good. But we were all guys in suits, or even blazers up to a certain point in time. To my knowledge, Mo Ostin never took a drug. Joe Smith never took a drug. We had Andy Wickham to take the drugs. ... Mo knew to go after people and find people who were not proven yet — to find someone like Andy Wickham, who might come in at two in the afternoon with his eyes not quite focused, but who knew Joni Mitchell and that whole crowd."

Journalist Barney Hoskyns, in Hotel California, his 2006 book about the late 1960s and early 1970s southern California music scene, described Wickham as Warner's "house hippie" who “worked Laurel Canyon’s narrow-laned hills, had long hair and did not keep office hours."

Cornyn, in a Rhino Records series called Stay Tuned, said that Mo Ostin told Wickham, "'Find me promising writers, singers.' He knew the cost of artists found by Andy would be much less than hiring those Sinatra veteran singers down in Palm Springs had been. Wickham became a discrete employee for Reprise. He specialized in Laurel Canyon and neighboring fields of music. Artists he brought to Mo proved to be bargains, and the list went on for some years: Joni Mitchell, Eric Andersen, Jethro Tull, Van Morrison... Andy brought to Reprise the hippest of times."
