= Merle Haggard =

American singer-songwriter (1937–2016)

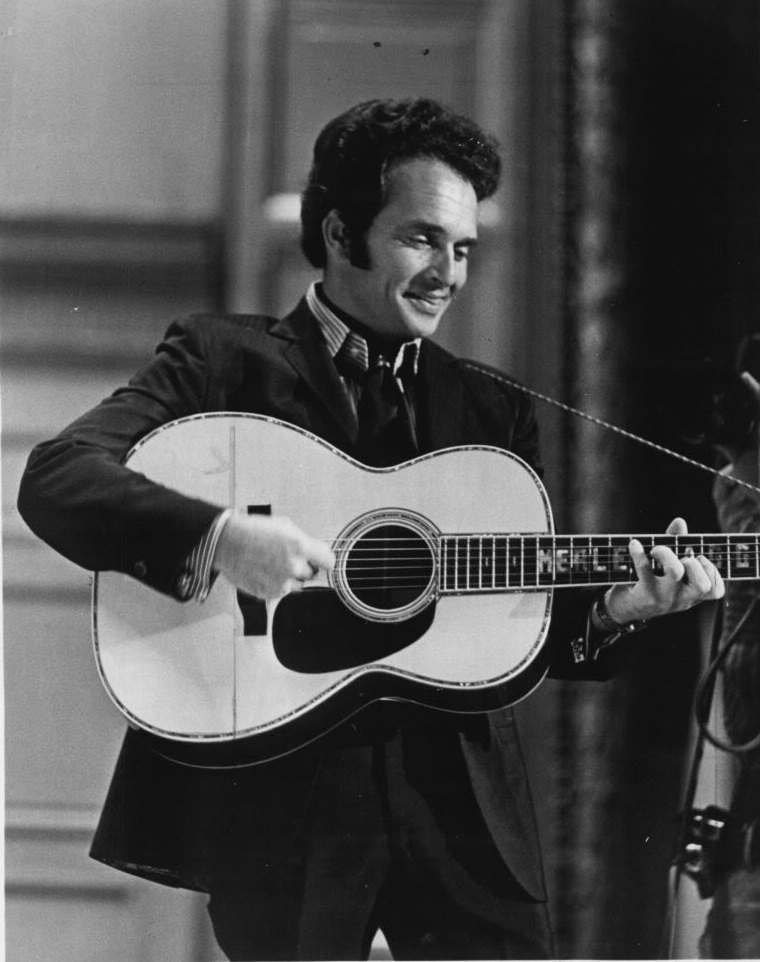
- Haggard performing live in 1971

Background information
- Born: Merle Ronald Haggard; April 6, 1937; Oildale, California, U.S.
- Died: April 6, 2016 (aged 79) Palo Cedro, California, U.S.
- Genres: Country; outlaw country; Bakersfield sound
- Occupations: Singer; songwriter; musician
- Instruments: Vocals; guitar; fiddle
- Years active: 1961–2016
- Labels: Capitol; MCA; Epic; Curb; ANTI-; Vanguard
- Formerly of: The Strangers
- Spouses: Leona Hobbs (m. 1956; div. 1964) Bonnie Owens (m. 1965; div. 1978) Leona Williams (m. 1978; div. 1983) Debbie Parret (m. 1985; div. 1991) Theresa Ann Lane (m. 1993)
- Children: 6, including Marty and Noel
- Website: merlehaggard.com

Merle Ronald Haggard (April 6, 1937 – April 6, 2016) was an American country music singer, songwriter, guitarist, and fiddler. Widely regarded as one of the greatest and most influential figures in country music, he was a central pioneer of the Bakersfield sound. With a career spanning over five decades, Haggard had 38 number-one hits on the US country charts, several of which also made the Billboard all-genre singles chart. His song "Mama Tried" has become a country staple.

Haggard overcame a troubled childhood, criminal convictions and time in prison to launch a successful country music career. He gained popularity with his songs about the working class; these occasionally contained themes contrary to the anti–Vietnam War sentiment of some popular music of the time, most notably "Okie From Muskogee", and "The Fightin' Side of Me".

Haggard received many honors and awards, including a Kennedy Center Honor (2010); a Grammy Lifetime Achievement Award (2006); a BMI Icon Award (2006); and induction into the Nashville Songwriters Hall of Fame (1977); Country Music Hall of Fame (1994) and Oklahoma Music Hall of Fame (1997).

In 2017, he earned the number one spot in Rolling Stone's list of "The 100 Greatest Country Artists of All Time", surpassing Johnny Cash and Hank Williams.

== Early life ==
External audio
- Country Music Legend Merle Haggard, interviewed by Terry Gross on Fresh Air, 42:14, August 14, 1995.

Haggard was born in Oildale, California, the son of Flossie Mae (née Harp; 1902–1984) and James Francis Haggard (1899–1946), who, in 1934, had moved to California after their farm in Checotah, Oklahoma, burned down.

They settled with their two elder children, James "Lowell" (1922–1996) and Lillian, in an apartment in Bakersfield, while James started working for the Santa Fe Railroad. A woman who owned a boxcar in nearby Oildale asked Haggard's father about the possibility of converting it into a house. He remodeled and expanded the boxcar, and soon after moved in, also purchasing the lot, where Merle Ronald Haggard was born on April 6, 1937.

In 1946, James Haggard died of a brain hemorrhage. Nine-year-old Merle was deeply affected by the loss, and it remained a pivotal event to him for the rest of his life. To support the family, Haggard's mother took a job as a bookkeeper. Older brother Lowell gave his guitar to Merle when Merle was 12. Haggard taught himself to play, with the records he had at home, influenced by Bob Wills, Lefty Frizzell, and Hank Williams. While his mother was at work, Haggard started getting into trouble. She sent him to a juvenile detention center for a weekend but his behavior worsened.

By age 13, Haggard was stealing and writing bad checks. In 1950 he was caught shoplifting and sent to a juvenile detention center. The following year, he ran away to Texas with his friend Bob Teague. The two rode freight trains and hitchhiked throughout the state. When they returned later that year, they were accused of robbery and sent to jail; they were released when the real robbers were found. Merle was sent to Fred C. Nelles Youth Correctional Facility in Whittier, California, a juvenile detention center later that year, from which he and his friend escaped and headed to Modesto, California. There, he worked as a potato truck driver, short order cook, hay pitcher and oil well shooter. During this time, he made his musical debut performance, with Teague, in a Modesto bar named "Fun Center", for which he was paid US$5 and given free beer.

In 1951, Haggard returned to Bakersfield, where he was arrested for truancy and petty larceny and sent to a juvenile detention center. After another escape, he was sent to the high-security Preston School of Industry. He was released 15 months later but was sent back after beating a local boy during a burglary attempt. After his release, he and Teague saw Lefty Frizzell in concert. The two sat backstage, where Haggard began to sing along. Hearing the young man from the stage, Frizzell insisted that Haggard come on stage and sing. He was well received by the audience and decided to pursue a career in music. At night he would sing and play in local bars, while working as a farmhand or in the oil fields during the day.

In 1956, Haggard got married but he was plagued by financial issues. In 1957, he tried to rob a Bakersfield roadhouse, but was caught, convicted and sent to the Bakersfield Jail. After an escape attempt he was transferred to San Quentin Prison on February 21, 1958. There he was prisoner number A45200. While in prison, Haggard learned that his wife was expecting another man's child, which stressed him psychologically. He was fired from a series of prison jobs, and planned to escape along with another inmate nicknamed "Rabbit" (James Kendrick) but was dissuaded by fellow inmates.

While in San Quentin, Haggard started a gambling and brewing racket with his cellmate. After he was caught drinking, he spent a week in solitary confinement, where he encountered Caryl Chessman, an author and death-row inmate. Meanwhile, "Rabbit" had successfully escaped, only to shoot a police officer and be returned to San Quentin for execution. Chessman's predicament, along with the execution of "Rabbit", inspired Haggard to change his life. He earned a high school equivalency diploma and kept a steady job in the prison's textile plant. He also played for the prison's country music band. In 1960, he attended a Johnny Cash concert at the prison, where Cash sang "Folsom Prison Blues". This had a profound influence on Haggard who, upon his release in 1960, set out to forge a career as a singer-songwriter.

In 1972, after Haggard had become a country music star, then-California governor Ronald Reagan granted him a full and unconditional pardon for his past crimes.

== Career ==
=== Early career ===
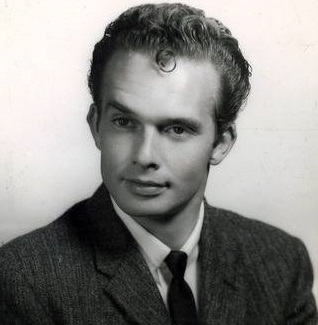
Haggard in a 1961 publicity photo for Tally Records

Upon his release from San Quentin in 1960, Haggard began digging ditches for his brother's electrical contracting company. Soon, he was performing again and later began recording with Tally Records. The Bakersfield sound was developing in the area as a reaction against the overproduced Nashville sound. Haggard's first record for Tally was "Singing My Heart Out" backed by "Skid Row"; it was not a success, and only 200 copies were pressed. In 1962, Haggard wound up performing at a Wynn Stewart show in Las Vegas and heard Wynn's "Sing a Sad Song". He asked for permission to record it, and the resulting single was a national hit in 1964. The following year, he had his first national top-10 record with "(My Friends Are Gonna Be) Strangers", written by Liz Anderson, mother of country singer Lynn Anderson, and his career was off and running. Haggard recalls having been talked into visiting Anderson—a woman he did not know—at her house to hear her sing some songs she had written. "If there was anything I didn't wanna do, it was sit around some danged woman's house and listen to her cute little songs. But I went anyway. She was a pleasant enough lady, pretty, with a nice smile, but I was all set to be bored to death, even more so when she got out a whole bunch of songs and went over to an old pump organ... There they were. My God, one hit right after another. There must have been four or five number one songs there..."

In 1967, Haggard recorded "I'm a Lonesome Fugitive" with the Strangers, also written by Liz Anderson, with her husband Casey Anderson, which became his first number-one single. When the Andersons presented the song to Haggard, they were unaware of his prison stretch. Bonnie Owens, Haggard's backup singer and then-wife, is quoted by music journalist Daniel Cooper in the liner notes to the 1994 retrospective Down Every Road: "I guess I didn't realize how much the experience at San Quentin did to him, 'cause he never talked about it all that much ... I could tell he was in a dark mood ... and I said, 'Is everything okay?' And he said, 'I'm really scared.' And I said, 'Why?' And he said, 'Cause I'm afraid someday I'm gonna be out there ... and there's gonna be ... some prisoner ... in there the same time I was in, stand up—and they're gonna be about the third row down—and say, 'What do you think you're doing, 45200?'" Cooper notes that the news had little effect on Haggard's career: "It's unclear when or where Merle first acknowledged to the public that his prison songs were rooted in personal history, for to his credit, he doesn't seem to have made some big splash announcement. In a May 1967 profile in Music City News, his prison record is never mentioned, but in July 1968, in the very same publication, it's spoken of as if it were common knowledge."

The 1967 album Branded Man with the Strangers kicked off an artistically and commercially successful run for Haggard. In 2013, Haggard biographer David Cantwell stated, "The immediate successors to I'm a Lonesome Fugitive—Branded Man in 1967 and, in '68, Sing Me Back Home and The Legend of Bonnie and Clyde—were among the finest albums of their respective years." Haggard's new recordings showcased his band the Strangers, specifically Roy Nichols's Telecaster, Ralph Mooney's steel guitar, and the harmony vocals provided by Bonnie Owens.

At the time of Haggard's first top-10 hit "(My Friends Are Gonna Be) Strangers" in 1965, Owens, who had been married to Buck Owens, was known as a solo performer, a fixture on the Bakersfield club scene and someone who had appeared on television. She won the new Academy of Country Music's first ever award for Female Vocalist after her 1965 debut album, Don't Take Advantage of Me, hit the top five on the country albums chart. However, Bonnie Owens had no further hit singles, and although she recorded six solo albums on Capitol between 1965 and 1970, she became mainly known for her background harmonies on Haggard hits such as "Sing Me Back Home" and "Branded Man".

Producer Ken Nelson took a hands-off approach to produce Haggard. In the episode of American Masters dedicated to him, Haggard remembers: "The producer I had at that time, Ken Nelson, was an exception to the rule. He called me 'Mr. Haggard' and I was a little twenty-four, twenty-five-year-old punk from Oildale... He gave me complete responsibility. I think if he'd jumped in and said, 'Oh, you can't do that', it would've destroyed me." In the documentary series Lost Highway, Nelson recalls, "When I first started recording Merle, I became so enamored with his singing that I would forget what else was going on, and I suddenly realized, 'Wait a minute, there's musicians here you've got to worry about!' But his songs—he was a great writer."

Towards the end of the decade, Haggard composed several number-one hits, including "Mama Tried", "The Legend of Bonnie and Clyde", "Hungry Eyes", and "Sing Me Back Home". Daniel Cooper calls "Sing Me Back Home" "a ballad that works on so many different levels of the soul it defies one's every attempt to analyze it". In a 1977 interview in Billboard with Bob Eubanks, Haggard reflected, "Even though the crime was brutal and the guy was an incorrigible criminal, it's a feeling you never forget when you see someone you know make that last walk. They bring him through the yard, and there's a guard in front and a guard behind—that's how you know a death prisoner. They brought Rabbit out ... taking him to see the Father, ... prior to his execution. That was a strong picture that was left in my mind." In 1969, Haggard's first tribute LP Same Train, Different Time: A Tribute to Jimmie Rodgers, was also released to acclaim.

In the 1969 Rolling Stone review for Haggard and the Strangers 1968 album Mama Tried, Andy Wickham wrote, "His songs romanticize the hardships and tragedies of America's transient proletarian and his success is resultant of his inherent ability to relate to his audience a commonplace experience with precisely the right emotional pitch... Merle Haggard looks the part and sounds the part because he is the part. He's great."

=== "Okie from Muskogee" and "The Fightin' Side of Me" ===
In 1969, Haggard and the Strangers released "Okie From Muskogee", with lyrics ostensibly reflecting the singer's pride in being from Middle America, where people are conventionally patriotic and traditionally conservative. American president Richard Nixon wrote an appreciative letter to Haggard upon his hearing of the song, and would go on to invite Haggard to perform at the White House several times.

In the ensuing years, Haggard gave varying statements regarding whether he intended the song as a humorous satire or a serious political statement in support of conservative values. In a 2001 interview, Haggard called the song a "documentation of the uneducated that lived in America at the time". However, he made several other statements suggesting that he meant the song seriously. On the Bob Edwards Show, he said, "I wrote it when I recently got out of the joint. I knew what it was like to lose my freedom, and I was getting really mad at these protesters. They didn't know anything more about the war in Vietnam than I did. I thought how my dad, who was from Oklahoma, would have felt. I felt I knew how those boys fighting in Vietnam felt." In the country music documentary series Lost Highway, he elaborated: "My dad passed away when I was nine, and I don't know if you've ever thought about somebody you've lost and you say, 'I wonder what so-and-so would think about this?' I was drivin' on Interstate 40 and I saw a sign that said '19 Miles to Muskogee', while at the same time listening to radio shows of The World Tomorrow hosted by Garner Ted Armstrong. Muskogee was always referred to in my childhood as 'back home.' So I saw that sign and my whole childhood flashed before my eyes and I thought, 'I wonder what dad would think about the youthful uprising that was occurring at the time, the Janis Joplins... I understood 'em, I got along with it, but what if he was to come alive at this moment? And I thought, what a way to describe the kind of people in America that are still sittin' in the center of the country sayin', 'What is goin' on on these campuses?'", as it was the subject of this Garner Ted Armstrong radio program. "And a week or so later, I was listening to Garner Ted Armstrong, and Armstrong was saying how the smaller colleges in smaller towns don't seem to have any problems. And I wondered if Muskogee had a college, and it did, and they hadn't had any trouble - no racial problems and no dope problems. The whole thing hit me in two minutes, and I did one line after another and got the whole thing done in 20 minutes." In the American Masters documentary about him, he said, "That's how I got into it with the hippies... I thought they were unqualified to judge America, and I thought they were lookin' down their noses at something that I cherished very much, and it pissed me off. And I thought, 'You sons of bitches, you've never been restricted away from this great, wonderful country, and yet here you are in the streets bitchin' about things, protesting about a war that they didn't know any more about than I did. They weren't over there fightin' that war any more than I was."

Haggard began performing the song in concert in 1969 and was astounded at the reaction it received:

The Haggard camp knew they were on to something. Everywhere they went, every show, "Okie" did more than prompt enthusiastic applause. There was an unanticipated adulation racing through the crowds now, standing ovations that went on and on and sometimes left the audience and the band members alike teary-eyed. Merle had somehow stumbled upon a song that expressed previously inchoate fears, spoke out loud gripes and anxieties otherwise only whispered, and now people were using his song, were using him, to connect themselves to these larger concerns and to one another.

The studio version, which was mellower than the usually raucous live-concert versions, topped the country charts in 1969 and remained there for a month. It also hit number 41 on the Billboard all-genre singles chart, becoming Haggard's biggest hit up to that time, surpassed only by his 1973 crossover Christmas hit, "If We Make It Through December", which peaked at number 28. "Okie from Muskogee" is also generally described as Haggard's signature song.

On his next single, "The Fightin' Side of Me", released by his record company in 1970 over Haggard's objections, Haggard's lyrics stated that he did not mind the counterculture "switchin' sides and standin' up for what they believe in", but resolutely declared, "If you don't love it, leave it!" In May 1970, Haggard explained to John Grissom of Rolling Stone, "I don't like their views on life, their filth, their visible self-disrespect, y'know. They don't give a shit what they look like or what they smell like... What do they have to offer humanity?" In a 2003 interview with No Depression magazine, Haggard said, "I had different views in the '70s. As a human being, I've learned [more]. I have more culture now. I was dumb as a rock when I wrote 'Okie From Muskogee'. That's being honest with you at the moment, and a lot of things that I said [then] I sing with a different intention now. My views on marijuana have totally changed. I think we were brainwashed and I think anybody that doesn't know that needs to get up and read and look around, get their own information. It's a cooperative government project to make us think marijuana should be outlawed."

Haggard had wanted to follow "Okie from Muskogee" with "Irma Jackson", a song that dealt with an interracial romance between a white man and an African American woman. His producer, Ken Nelson, discouraged him from releasing it as a single. Jonathan Bernstein recounts, "Hoping to distance himself from the harshly right-wing image he had accrued in the wake of the hippie-bashing "Muskogee", Haggard wanted to take a different direction and release "Irma Jackson" as his next single... When the Bakersfield, California, native brought the song to his record label, executives were reportedly appalled. In the wake of "Okie", Capitol Records was not interested in complicating Haggard's conservative, blue-collar image."

After "The Fightin' Side of Me" was released instead, Haggard later commented to The Wall Street Journal, "People are narrow-minded. Down South they might have called me a nigger lover." In a 2001 interview, Haggard stated that Nelson, who was also head of the country division at Capitol at the time, never interfered with his music, but "this one time he came out and said, 'Merle, I don't believe the world is ready for this yet.' ... And he might have been right. I might've canceled out where I was headed in my career."

"Okie From Muskogee", "The Fightin' Side of Me", and "I Wonder If They Think of Me" (Haggard's 1973 song about an American POW in Vietnam) were hailed as anthems of the silent majority, and have been recognized as part of a recurring patriotic trend in American country music that also includes Charlie Daniels' "In America" and Lee Greenwood's "God Bless the USA". Although Gordon Friesen of Broadside magazine criticized Haggard for his "[John] Birch–type songs against war dissenters", Haggard was popular with college students in the early 1970s, not only because of the ironic use of his songs by counterculture members, but also because his music was recognized as coming from an early country-folk tradition. Both "Okie from Muskogee" and "The Fightin' Side of Me" received extensive airplay on underground radio stations, and "Okie" was performed in concert by protest singers Arlo Guthrie and Phil Ochs.

=== Later career ===
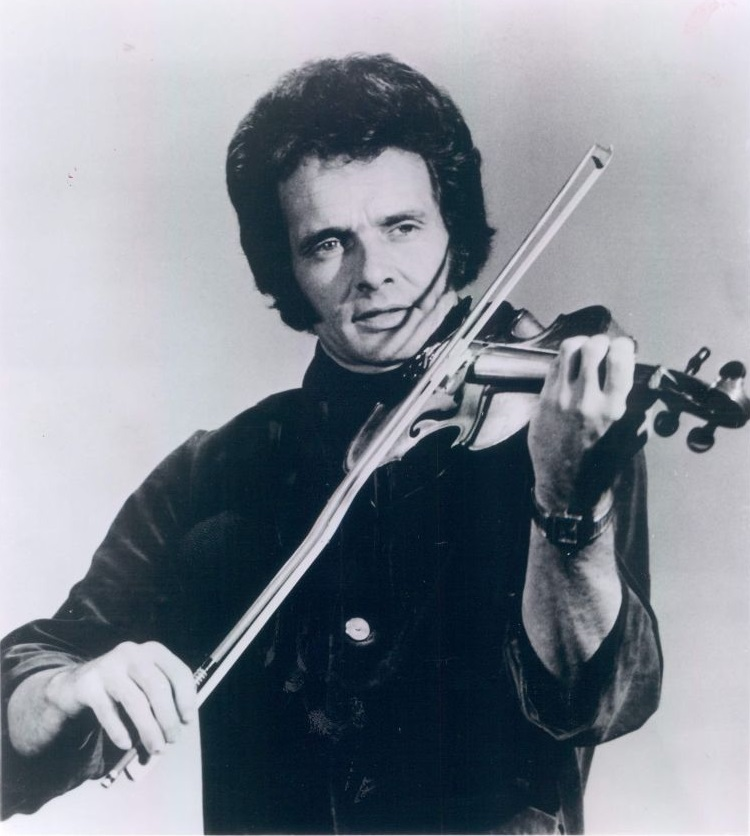
Haggard in a 1975 publicity photo for Capitol Records

Haggard's 1970 LP A Tribute to the Best Damn Fiddle Player in the World, dedicated to Bob Wills, helped spark a permanent revival and expanded the audience for western swing. By this point, Haggard was one of the most famous country singers in the world, having enjoyed an immensely successful artistic and commercial run with Capitol, accumulating 24 number-one country singles since 1966.

In 1972, Let Me Tell You about A Song, the first TV special starring Haggard, was nationally syndicated by Capital Cities TV Productions. It was a semi-autobiographical musical profile of Haggard, akin to the contemporary Behind the Music, produced and directed by Michael Davis. The 1973 recession anthem, "If We Make It Through December", furthered Haggard's status as a champion of the working class. "If We Make It Through December" turned out to be Haggard and the Strangers' final crossover pop hit.

Haggard appeared on the cover of Time on May 6, 1974. He also wrote and performed the theme song to the television series Movin' On, which in 1975 gave him and the Strangers another number-one country hit. During the early-to-mid-1970s, Haggard and the Strangers country chart domination continued with songs such as "Someday We'll Look Back", "Grandma Harp", "Always Wanting You", and "The Roots of My Raising". Between 1973 and 1976, he and the Strangers scored nine consecutive number-one country hits.

Haggard appeared in an episode of The Waltons titled "The Comeback", season five, episode three, original air-date October 10, 1976. He played a bandleader named Red, who had been depressed since the death of his son (Ron Howard).

In 1977, he switched to MCA Records and began exploring the themes of depression, alcoholism, and middle age on albums such as Serving 190 Proof and The Way I Am. Haggard sang a duet cover of Billy Burnette's "What's A Little Love Between Friends" with Lynda Carter in her 1980 television music special, Lynda Carter: Encore! In 1980, Haggard headlined the Bronco Billy soundtrack alongside Ronnie Milsap, which saw Haggard score a number-one hit with "Bar Room Buddies", a duet with actor Clint Eastwood.

In 1981, Haggard published an autobiography, Sing Me Back Home. The same year, he provided the narration and theme for the movie The Legend of the Lone Ranger. The movie did not perform as well as expected attributing its commercial failure to the Wrather/Moore dispute which generated negative publicity. Haggard also changed record labels again in 1981, moving to Epic and releasing one of his most critically acclaimed albums, Big City, on which he was backed by the Strangers.

Between 1981 and 1985, Haggard scored 12 more top-10 country hits, with nine of them reaching number one, including "My Favorite Memory", "Going Where the Lonely Go", "Someday When Things Are Good", and "Natural High". In addition, Haggard recorded two chart-topping duets with George Jones—"Yesterdays' Wine" in 1982—and with Willie Nelson—"Pancho and Lefty" in 1983. Nelson believed the 1983 Academy Award-winning film Tender Mercies, about the life of fictional singer Mac Sledge, was based on the life of Merle Haggard. Actor Robert Duvall and other filmmakers denied this and claimed the character was based on nobody in particular. Duvall, however, said he was a big fan of Haggard's.

In 1983, Haggard and his third wife Leona Williams divorced after five stormy years of marriage. The split served as a license to party for Haggard, who spent much of the next decade becoming mired in alcohol and drug problems. Haggard has stated that he was in his own mid-life crisis, or "male menopause", around this time. He said in an interview from this period: "Things that you've enjoyed for years don't seem nearly as important, and you're at war with yourself as to what's happening. 'Why don't I like that anymore? Why do I like this now?' And finally, I think you actually go through a biological change, you just, you become another... Your body is getting ready to die and your mind doesn't agree." He was briefly a heavy user of cocaine but was able to quit. Despite these issues, he won a Grammy Award for Best Male Country Vocal Performance for his 1984 remake of "That's the Way Love Goes".

Haggard was hampered by financial woes well into the 1990s, as his presence on the charts diminished in favor of newer country singers, such as George Strait and Randy Travis. Haggard's last number-one hit was "Twinkle, Twinkle Lucky Star" from his smash album Chill Factor in 1988.

In 1989, Haggard recorded a song, "Me and Crippled Soldiers Give a Damn", in response to the Supreme Court's decision not to allow banning flag burning, considering it to be "speech" and therefore protected under the First Amendment. After CBS Records Nashville avoided releasing the song, Haggard bought his way out of the contract and signed with Curb Records, which was willing to release the song. Haggard commented about the situation, "I've never been a guy that can do what people told me... It's always been my nature to fight the system."

=== Comeback ===
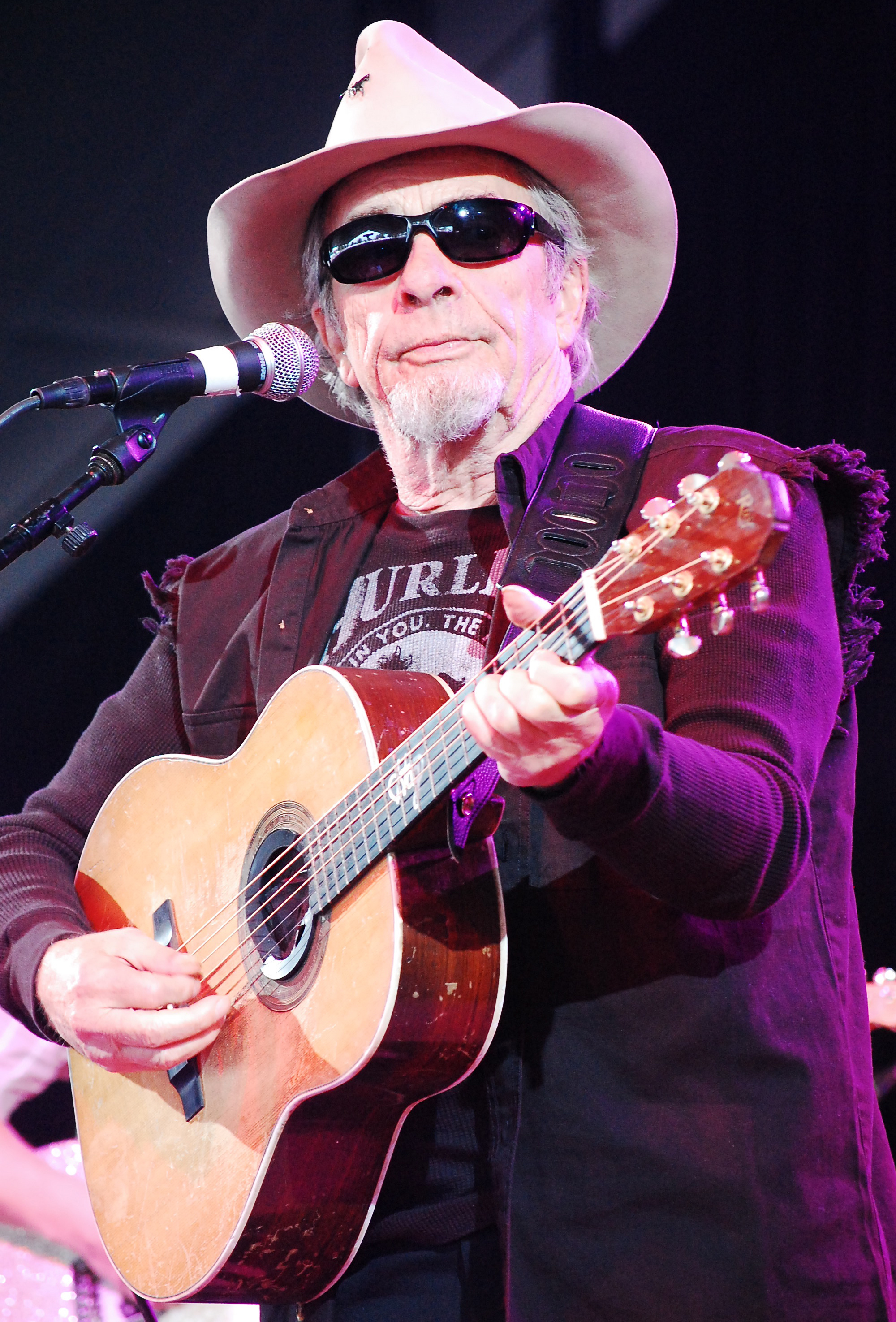
Haggard performing in June 2009

In 2000, Haggard made a comeback of sorts, signing with the independent record label Anti and releasing the spare If I Could Only Fly to critical acclaim. He followed it in 2001 with Roots, vol. 1, a collection of Lefty Frizzell, Hank Williams, and Hank Thompson covers, along with three Haggard originals. The album, recorded in Haggard's living room with no overdubs, featured Haggard's longtime bandmates, the Strangers, as well as Frizzell's original lead guitarist, Norman Stephens. In December 2004, Haggard spoke at length on Larry King Live about his incarceration as a young man and said it was "hell" and "the scariest experience of my life".

When political opponents were attacking the Chicks for criticizing President George W. Bush's 2003 invasion of Iraq, Haggard spoke up for the band on July 25, 2003, saying:

I don't even know the Dixie Chicks, but I find it an insult for all the men and women who fought and died in past wars when almost the majority of America jumped down their throats for voicing an opinion. It was like a verbal witch-hunt and lynching.

Haggard and the Strangers' number-one hit single "Mama Tried" is featured in Bryan Bertino's The Strangers with Liv Tyler. In addition, his and the Strangers song "Swingin' Doors" can be heard in the film Crash (2004), and his 1981 hit "Big City", where he is backed by the Strangers, is heard in Joel and Ethan Coen's film Fargo.

He's not going to play The Palace in Louisville, he's going pick the tertiary towns, and he's going to play on the outer edge. Merle was a real westerner. Like one of those lizards that thrives in arid heat. He was a California guy, but not the California you see on television with Palm Trees. He was the California that was dusty, that was Merle's.

— Ketch Secor, Old Crow Medicine Show

In October 2005, Haggard released his album Chicago Wind to mostly positive reviews. The album contains an anti-Iraq War song titled "America First", in which he laments the nation's economy and faltering infrastructure, applauds its soldiers, and sings, "Let's get out of Iraq, and get back on track." This follows from his 2003 release "Haggard Like Never Before" in which he includes a song, "That's the News". Haggard released a bluegrass album, The Bluegrass Sessions, on October 2, 2007.

In April 2010, Haggard released a new album, I Am What I Am, to strong reviews, and he performed the title song on The Tonight Show with Jay Leno in February 2011. Haggard's final concert was held in Oakland at the Paramount Theatre on February 13, 2016.

=== Collaborations ===
Haggard collaborated with many other artists over the course of his career. In the early 1960s, Haggard recorded duets with Bonnie Owens, who later became his wife, for Tally Records, scoring a minor hit with "Just Between the Two of Us". As part of the deal that got Haggard signed to Capitol, producer Ken Nelson obtained the rights to Haggard's Tally sides, including the duets with Owens, resulting in the release of Haggard's first duet album with Owens and the Strangers in 1966, also entitled Just Between the Two of Us. The album reached number four on the country charts, and Haggard and Owens recorded a number of additional duets before their divorce in 1978. Haggard went on to record duets with George Jones, Willie Nelson, and Clint Eastwood, among others.

In 1970, Haggard released A Tribute to the Best Damn Fiddle Player in the World (or, My Salute to Bob Wills), rounding up six of the remaining members of the Texas Playboys to record the tribute: Johnnie Lee Wills, Eldon Shamblin, Tiny Moore, Joe Holley, Johnny Gimble, and Alex Brashear. Haggard's band, the Strangers, were also present during the recording, but Wills suffered a massive stroke after the first day of recording. Haggard arrived on the second day, devastated that he would not get to record with him, but the album helped return Wills to public consciousness, and set off a Western swing revival. Haggard did other tribute albums to Bob Wills over the next 40 years. In 1973 he appeared on For the Last Time: Bob Wills and His Texas Playboys. In 1994, Haggard collaborated with Asleep at the Wheel and many other artists influenced by the music of Bob Wills on an album titled A Tribute to the Music of Bob Wills and the Texas Playboys. A Tribute was re-released on CD on the Koch label in 1995.

In 1972, Haggard agreed to produce Gram Parsons's first solo album but backed out at the last minute. Warner Bros. arranged a meeting at Haggard's Bakersfield home and the two musicians seemed to hit it off, but later on the afternoon of the first session, Haggard canceled. Parsons, an enormous Haggard fan, was crushed, with his wife Gretchen telling Meyer, "Merle not producing Gram was probably one of the greatest disappointments in Gram's life. Merle was very nice, very sweet, but he had his own enemies and his own demons." In 1980, Haggard said of Parsons, in an interview with Mark Rose, "He was a pussy. Hell, he was just a long-haired kid. I thought he was a good writer. He was not wild, though. That's what's funny to me. All these guys running around in long hair talking about being wild and Rolling Stones. I don't think someone abusing themselves on drugs determines how wild they are. It might determine how ignorant they are."

In 1982, Haggard recorded A Taste of Yesterday's Wine with George Jones, an album that produced two top-10 hits, including the number-one "Yesterday's Wine". In 2006, the pair released a sequel, Kickin' Out the Footlights...Again.

Haggard released the duet album Pancho & Lefty with Willie Nelson in 1983, with the title track becoming an enormous hit for the duo. In 1987, a second, less successful LP, Seashores of Old Mexico, was also released, and the pair worked together again with Ray Price in 2007, releasing the album Last of the Breed. In 2015, they released their sixth and final duet album, Django and Jimmie. The album's lead single, "It's All Going to Pot", was a subtle reference to smoking marijuana, and the music video for the song showed Haggard and Nelson smoking joints while singing in a recording studio.

In 1983, Haggard got permission from Epic Records to collaborate with then-wife Leona Williams on Polydor Records, releasing Heart to Heart in 1983. The album, on which they were backed by the Strangers, was not a hit, peaking at number 44.

In 2001, Haggard released an album of gospel songs with Albert E. Brumley called Two Old Friends. In 2002, Haggard collaborated with longtime friend and fellow recording artist Chester Smith (founder of television broadcasting company Sainte Partners II, L.P. and owner of several stations in California and Oregon) with a CD titled California Blend. The CD features classic country, western, and gospel tracks performed by both Smith and Haggard.

In 2005, Haggard was featured as a guest vocalist on Gretchen Wilson's song "Politically Uncorrect", which earned a Grammy nomination for Best Country Collaboration with Vocals. He is also featured singing a verse on Eric Church's 2006 song "Pledge Allegiance to the Hag".That same year, Haggard was featured as a guest vocalist on Blaine Larsen's song "If Merle Would Sing My Song".

In 2010, Haggard was featured along with Ralph Nader, Willie Nelson, Gatewood Galbraith and Julia Butterfly Hill in the documentary film Hempsters: Plant the Seed directed by Michael P. Henning.

In 2015, Haggard was featured as a guest vocalist on Don Henley's song "The Cost of Living" on the album Cass County. Henley would later say he was "nervous", but "happily surprised" that Haggard joined him on the track.

In 2017, Haggard appeared alongside Willie Nelson in the award-winning documentary The American Epic Sessions directed by Bernard MacMahon. They performed a song Haggard had composed for the film, "The Only Man Wilder Than Me" and Bob Wills' classic "Old Fashioned Love", which they recorded live on the restored first electrical sound recording system from the 1920s. It was the last filmed performance of the pair, with Rolling Stone commenting "in the final performance of Sessions, Willie Nelson and Merle Haggard perform the duet "The Only Man Wilder Than Me". Haggard has a look of complete joy on his face throughout the session in the old-timey recording set-up once used by his musical heroes."

Haggard's last recording, a song called "Kern River Blues", described his departure from Bakersfield in the late 1970s and his displeasure with politicians. The song was recorded February 9, 2016, and features his son Ben on guitar. This record was released on May 12, 2016.

== Equipment ==
Haggard endorsed Fender guitars and had a Custom Artist signature model Telecaster. The guitar is a modified Telecaster Thinline with laminated top of figured maple, set neck with deep carved heel, birdseye maple fingerboard with 22 jumbo frets, ivoroid pickguard and binding, gold hardware, abalone Tuff Dog Tele peghead inlay, 2-Colour Sunburst finish, and a pair of Fender Texas Special Tele single-coil pickups with custom-wired 4-way pickup switching. He also played six-string acoustic models. In 2001, C. F. Martin & Company introduced a limited edition Merle Haggard Signature Edition 000-28SMH acoustic guitar available with or without factory-installed electronics.

== Personal life ==
=== Wives and children ===
Haggard was married five times, first to Leona Hobbs from 1956 to 1964. They had four children: Dana, Marty, Kelli, and Noel.

Shortly after divorcing Hobbs, in 1965, he married singer Bonnie Owens, the former wife of Buck Owens. Haggard credited her with helping him make his big break as a country artist. He shared the writing credit with Owens for his hit "Today I Started Loving You Again" and acknowledged, including on stage, that the song was about a sudden burst of special feelings he experienced for her while they were touring together. She also helped care for Haggard's children from his first marriage and was the maid of honor for Haggard's third marriage. Haggard and Owens divorced in 1978 but remained close friends as Owens continued as his backing vocalist until her death in 2006.

In 1978, Haggard married Leona Williams. In 1983, they divorced. In 1985 Haggard married Debbie Parret; they divorced in 1991. He married his fifth wife, Theresa Ann Lane, on September 11, 1993. They had two children, Jenessa and Ben.

=== Cigarette and drug use ===
Haggard said he started smoking marijuana in 1978, when he was 41 years old. He admitted that in 1983, he bought "$2,000 (worth) of cocaine" and partied for five months afterward, when he said he finally realized his condition and quit for good. He quit smoking cigarettes in 1991, and stopped smoking marijuana in 1995. However, a Rolling Stone magazine interview in 2009 indicated that he had resumed regular marijuana smoking.

=== Illness and death ===
Haggard underwent angioplasty in 1995 to unblock clogged arteries. On November 9, 2008, it was announced that he had been diagnosed with lung cancer in May and undergone surgery on November 3, during which part of his lung was removed. Haggard returned home on November 8. Less than two months after his cancer surgery, he played two shows on January 2 and 3, 2009, in Bakersfield at Buck Owens Crystal Palace, and continued to tour and record until shortly before his death.

On December 5, 2015, Haggard was treated at an undisclosed hospital in California for pneumonia. He made a recovery, but postponed several concerts.

In March 2016, Haggard was once again hospitalized. His concerts for April were canceled due to his ongoing double pneumonia. On the morning of April 6, 2016, his 79th birthday, he died of complications from pneumonia at his home in Palo Cedro, Shasta County, California. Haggard was buried in a private funeral at his ranch on April 9, 2016; longtime friend Marty Stuart officiated.

== Legacy and honors ==
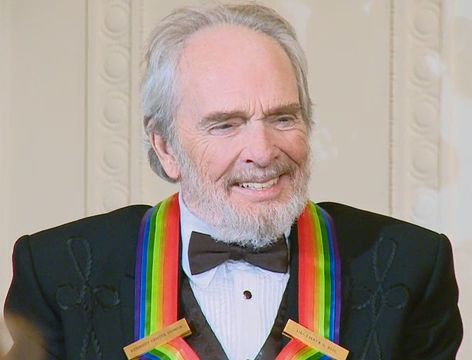
Haggard at the White House for the 2010 Kennedy Center Honors

During his long career, Haggard received numerous awards from the Academy of Country Music, Country Music Association, and National Academy of Recording Arts and Sciences (Grammy Awards) (see Awards). He was inducted into the Nashville Songwriters Hall of Fame in 1977, the Country Music Hall of Fame and Museum in 1994, and the Oklahoma Music Hall of Fame in 1997. In 2006, he received a Grammy Lifetime Achievement Award, and was also honored as a BMI Icon at the 54th annual BMI Pop Awards that same year. During his songwriting career up to that time, Haggard had earned 48 BMI Country Awards, nine BMI Pop Awards, a BMI R&B Award, and 16 BMI "Million-Air" awards, all from a catalog of songs that added up to over 25 million performances.

Haggard accepted a Kennedy Center Honor on December 4, 2010, from the John F. Kennedy Center for the Performing Arts in recognition of his lifetime achievement and "outstanding contribution to American culture". The following day, he was honored at a gala in Washington, DC, with musical performances by Kris Kristofferson, Willie Nelson, Sheryl Crow, Vince Gill, Jamey Johnson, Kid Rock, Miranda Lambert, and Brad Paisley. This tribute was featured on the December 28, 2010, CBS telecast of the Kennedy Center Honors.

In July 2007, a three-and-a-half-mile stretch of 7th Standard Road in Oildale, California, where Haggard grew up, was renamed Merle Haggard Drive in his honor. It stretches from North Chester Avenue west to U.S. Route 99 and provides access to the William M. Thomas airport terminal at Meadows Field Airport. Haggard played two shows to raise money to pay for the changes in road signage. In 2015, the converted boxcar in which the Haggard family lived in Oildale was moved to the Kern County Museum for historic preservation and restoration.

On June 14, 2013, the California State University, Bakersfield, awarded Haggard the honorary degree of Doctor of Fine Arts. Haggard stepped to the podium and said, "Thank you. It's nice to be noticed."

On November 6, 2013, the mayor of Winchester, Virginia, awarded Haggard the Key to the City at the Patsy Cline Theatre after a sold-out show by Bonnie Blue Concerts.

On January 26, 2014, Haggard performed his 1969 song "Okie from Muskogee" at the 56th Annual Grammy Awards along with Kris Kristofferson, Willie Nelson, and Blake Shelton.

In 2023, Rolling Stone ranked Haggard at number 138 on its list of the 200 Greatest Singers of All Time.

=== Influence ===
Haggard's guitar playing and voice gave his country songs a hard-edged, blues-like style in many cuts. Although he was outspoken in his dislike for modern country music, he praised George Strait, Toby Keith, Alan Jackson, and Sturgill Simpson. Haggard also had an interest in jazz music, and stated in an interview in 1986 that he wanted to be remembered as "the greatest jazz guitar player in the world that loved to play country". Keith singled out Haggard as a major influence on his career.

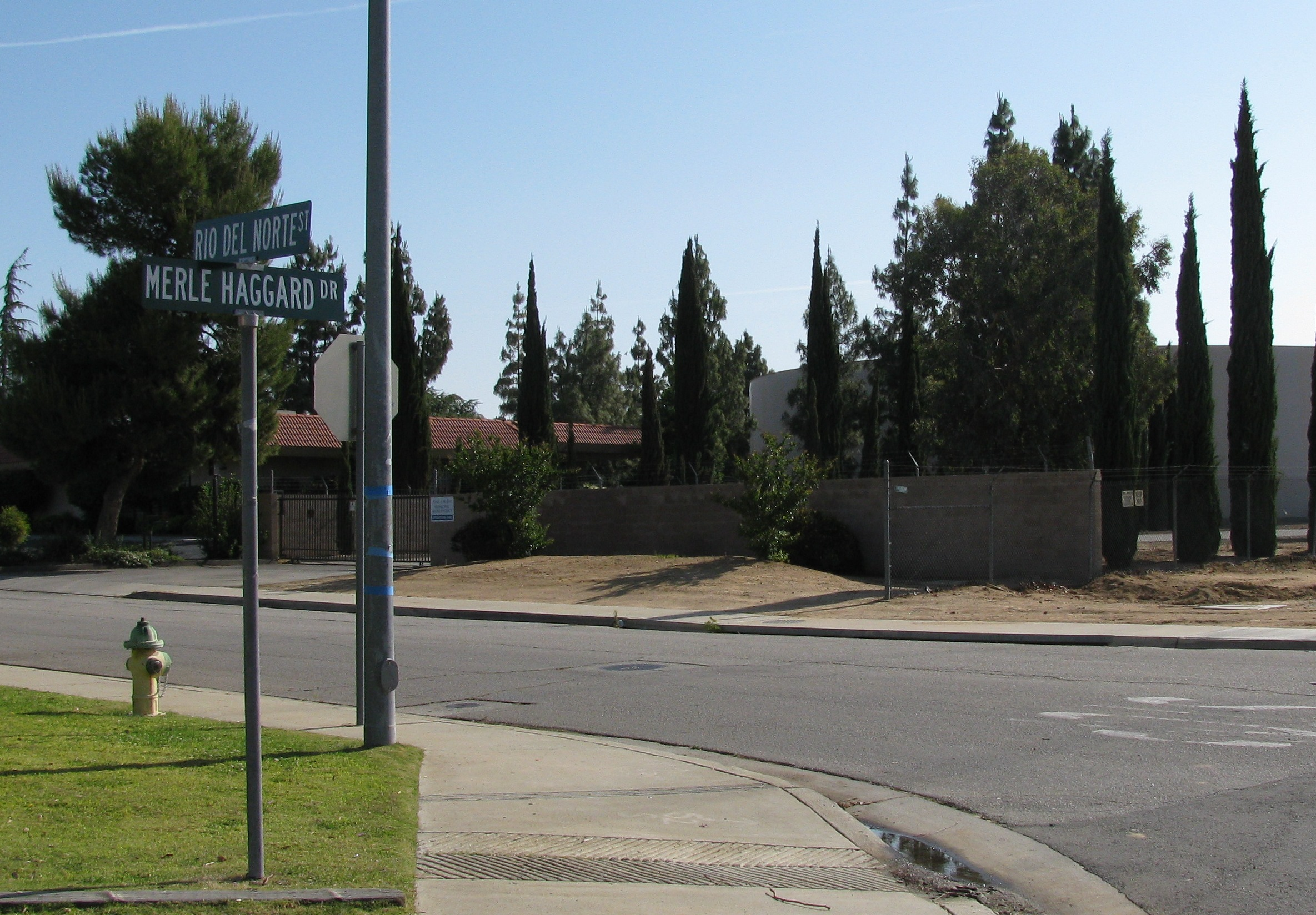
Merle Haggard Drive, Oildale, California

As noted by an article published in The Washington Post upon Haggard's death, "Respect for the Hag [Haggard] as an icon, both for his musical status and his personal views, is a common theme" in country music. Many country music acts have paid tribute to Haggard by mentioning him in their songs (a fact aided by his first name rhyming with "girl", a common theme in country songs). These include:

- Collin Raye recorded "My Kind of Girl", which includes the line, "How 'bout some music/She said have you got any Merle/That's when I knew she was my kind of girl."
- In 2000, Alan Jackson and George Strait sang "Murder on Music Row", which criticizes mainstream country trends: "The Hag wouldn't have a chance on today's radio/Because they committed murder down on music row."
- In 2005, the country rock duo Brooks & Dunn sang "Just Another Neon Night" off their Hillbilly Deluxe album. In the song, Ronnie Dunn said, "He's got an Eastwood grin and a Tulare swagger/Hollerin' turn off that rap/And play me some Haggard." Brooks and Dunn also reference Haggard in 1993's "Rock My World (little country girl)" off their Hard Workin' Man album as they sing "Acts like Madonna but she listens to Merle/Rock my world little country girl."
- In 2009, Jimmy Buffett's song Wings refers to Haggard and his song Silver Wings in the verse "You have wings look and see, Silver wings like Merle and me".
- LeAnn Rimes mentions him in her 2013 song, "I Do Now": "Thank God for Merle Haggard, he's right, the bottle let me down."
- Gretchen Wilson's song "Politically Uncorrect" and Eric Church's song "Pledge Allegiance to the Hag" both contain tributes to Haggard, as well as featuring him as a guest vocalist.
- Country singer David Nail references the Haggard song "Mama Tried" in the lyrics to his song "The Sound of a Million Dreams" from his 2011 album of the same name: "...when I hear Mama Tried I still break down and cry And pull to the side of the road...". The song was written by Phil Vassar & Scooter Carusoe.
- In John Anderson's song "Honky Tonk Saturday Night", he sings the lines, "I went to the jukebox and played some Merle Haggard/Oh me and the waitress think he's outta sight".
- Cody Johnson centralizes Merle in his song "Monday Morning Merle", with a reference in the chorus "...turns up 'Misery and Gin', here we are again - Monday Morning Merle."
- Cody Jinks's song "Hippies and Cowboys" has the following lyrics "Some old drunk on a bar stool on a Merle Haggard tune, that's my kind of room."

In the 1970s, several rock acts responded in their own songs to Haggard's criticism of hippie counterculture in "Okie from Muskogee" and "The Fightin' Side of Me". The Youngbloods answered "Okie from Muskogee" with "Hippie from Olema", in which, in one repetition of the chorus, they change the line, "We still take in strangers if they're ragged" to "We still take in strangers if they're haggard." Nick Gravenites, of Big Brother and the Holding Company, paid Haggard a tongue-in-cheek tribute with the song, "I'll Change Your Flat Tire, Merle", later covered by other artists including Pure Prairie League. Despite these critiques, the Grateful Dead performed "Mama Tried" over 300 times, and "Sing Me Back Home" approximately 40 times.

The Southern rock band Lynyrd Skynyrd more respectfully referenced Haggard in their song, "Railroad Song", which contains the lyric, "Well I'm a ride this train Lord until I find out/What Jimmie Rodgers and the Hag was all about." Skynyrd also performed both a cover of "Honky Tonk Night Time Man" and their own take on the song with "Jacksonville Kid" (found on the 2001 CD reissue of the album) on their album Street Survivors. He described himself as a student of music, philosophy, and communication. He would discuss jazzman Howard Roberts guitar playing, life after death and the unique speaking technique of Garner Ted Armstrong of The World Tomorrow with enthusiasm and authority.

=== Acting ===
His first acting appearance was in the movie Hillbillys in a Haunted House, released in May 1967. He played himself and sang his song "Swinging Doors". He then played Charlie, a police officer who gets killed in the movie Killers Three. It was released in November 1968 and was produced by Dick Clark. In 1969 he appeared in the film "From Nashville with Music" performing "Branded Man", "Today I Started Loving You Again", "Hungry Eyes" and "Lead Me On" with Bonnie Owens and The Strangers.

On March 13, 1974, he guest starred on the ABC television show Doc Elliot appearing as Owen Henderson in the episode "The Gold Mine" alongside Karl Swenson. While he did not act in the show, he sang the theme song "Movin’ On" for Claude Akins NBC series Movin' On, which ran from May 8, 1974 through March 2, 1976. On March 25, 1975, he starred as the Duke in ABC’s television movie Huckleberry Finn, which was directed by Robert Totten and co-starred Ron Howard and Jack Elam. He guest starred on the CBS series The Waltons on the October 7, 1976 episode "The Comeback". He portrayed Red Turner and sang the Jimmie Davis song "Nobody's Darlin' But Mine".

On February 4, 1979 he appeared on the final episode of the NBC miniseries Centennial entitled "The Scream of Eagles". He played Cisco Calendar and sang the song "I Guess He'd Rather Be in Colorado". He also appeared as himself in the Clint Eastwood movie Bronco Billy that was released on June 11, 1980. He was backed by The Strangers and performed the song "Misery and Gin". He also was featured as the Narrator/Balladeer for the movie The Legend of the Lone Ranger. It was released on May 22, 1981 and starred Christopher Lloyd and Jason Robards. He also appeared in 1985’s television film All American Cowboy.

== Discography ==
=== Studio albums ===
- Strangers (1965)
- Just Between the Two of Us (with Bonnie Owens and the Strangers) (1966)
- Swinging Doors (with the Strangers) (1966)
- I'm a Lonesome Fugitive (with the Strangers) (1967)
- Branded Man (with the Strangers) (1967)
- Sing Me Back Home (with the Strangers) (1968)
- The Legend of Bonnie & Clyde (with the Strangers) (1968)
- Mama Tried (with the Strangers) (1968)
- Pride in What I Am (with the Strangers) (1969)
- Same Train, a Different Time (with the Strangers) (1969)
- A Portrait of Merle Haggard (with the Strangers) (1969)
- A Tribute to the Best Damn Fiddle Player in the World (or, My Salute to Bob Wills) (with the Strangers) (1970)
- Hag (with the Strangers) (1971)
- Someday We'll Look Back (with the Strangers) (1971)
- Let Me Tell You About a Song (with the Strangers) (1972)
- It's Not Love (But It's Not Bad) (with the Strangers) (1972)
- Merle Haggard's Christmas Present (Something Old, Something New) (1973)
- If We Make It Through December (with the Strangers) (1974)
- Merle Haggard Presents His 30th Album (with the Strangers) (1974)
- Keep Movin' On (with the Strangers) (1975)
- It's All in the Movies (with the Strangers) (1976)
- My Love Affair with Trains (with the Strangers) (1976)
- The Roots of My Raising (with the Strangers) (1976)
- Ramblin' Fever (1977)
- A Working Man Can't Get Nowhere Today (with the Strangers) (1977)
- My Farewell to Elvis (1977)
- I'm Always on a Mountain When I Fall (1978)
- Serving 190 Proof (1979)
- The Way I Am (1980)
- Back to the Barrooms (1980)
- Songs for the Mama That Tried (1981)
- Big City (1981)
- A Taste of Yesterday's Wine (with George Jones) (1982)
- Going Where the Lonely Go (1982)
- Goin' Home for Christmas (1982)
- Pancho & Lefty (with Willie Nelson) (1983)
- Heart to Heart (with Leona Williams) (1983)
- That's the Way Love Goes (1983)
- It's All in the Game (1984)
- Kern River (1985)
- A Friend in California (1986)
- Out Among the Stars (1986)
- Seashores of Old Mexico (with Willie Nelson) (1987)
- Chill Factor (1987)
- 5:01 Blues (1989)
- Blue Jungle (1990)
- 1994 (1994)
- 1996 (1996)
- Two Old Friends (with Albert Brumley, Jr.) (1999)
- If I Could Only Fly (2000)
- Cabin in the Hills (2001)
- Roots, Volume 1 (2001)
- The Peer Sessions (2002)
- Like Never Before (2003)
- I Wish I Was Santa Claus (2004)
- Unforgettable (2004)
- Chicago Wind (2005)
- Kickin' Out the Footlights...Again (with George Jones) (2006)
- Last of the Breed (with Willie Nelson and Ray Price) (2007)
- The Bluegrass Sessions (2007)
- I Am What I Am (2010)
- Working in Tennessee (2011)
- Django and Jimmie (with Willie Nelson) (2015)
- Timeless (with Mac Wiseman) (2015)

=== Number-one hits on U.S. country charts ===
1. "I'm a Lonesome Fugitive" (1966) with the Strangers
2. "Branded Man" (1967) with the Strangers
3. "Sing Me Back Home" (1968) with the Strangers
4. "The Legend of Bonnie and Clyde" (1968) with the Strangers
5. "Mama Tried" (1968) with the Strangers
6. "Hungry Eyes" (1969) with the Strangers
7. "Workin' Man Blues" (1969) with the Strangers
8. "Okie from Muskogee" (1969) with the Strangers
9. "The Fightin' Side of Me" (1970) with the Strangers
10. "Daddy Frank" (1971) with the Strangers
11. "Carolyn" (1971) with the Strangers
12. "Grandma Harp" (1972) with the Strangers
13. "It's Not Love (But It's Not Bad)" (1972) with the Strangers
14. "I Wonder If They Ever Think of Me" (1972) with the Strangers
15. "Everybody's Had the Blues" (1973) with the Strangers
16. "If We Make It Through December" (1973) with the Strangers
17. "Things Aren't Funny Anymore" (1974) with the Strangers
18. "Old Man from the Mountain" (1974) with the Strangers
19. "Kentucky Gambler" (1974) with the Strangers
20. "Always Wanting You" (1975) with the Strangers
21. "Movin' On" (1975) with the Strangers
22. "It's All in the Movies" (1975) with the Strangers
23. "The Roots of My Raising" (1975) with the Strangers
24. "Cherokee Maiden" (1976) with the Strangers
25. "Bar Room Buddies" (with Clint Eastwood) (1980)
26. "I Think I'll Just Stay Here and Drink" (1980)
27. "My Favorite Memory" (1981)
28. "Big City" (1981)
29. "Yesterday's Wine" (with George Jones) (1982)
30. "Going Where the Lonely Go" (1982)
31. "You Take Me for Granted" (1982)
32. "Pancho and Lefty" (with Willie Nelson) (1983)
33. "That's the Way Love Goes" (1983)
34. "Someday When Things Are Good" (1984)
35. "Let's Chase Each Other Around the Room" (1984)
36. "A Place to Fall Apart" (with Janie Frickie) (1984)
37. "Natural High" (1985)
38. "Twinkle, Twinkle Lucky Star" (1987)

== Awards ==
Academy of Country Music

- 1965 Most Promising Male Vocalist
- 1965 Best Vocal Group – with Bonnie Owens
- 1965 Top Vocal Group with Bonnie Owens
- 1966 Top Male Vocalist
- 1967 Top Duo with Bonnie Owens
- 1969 Top Male Vocalist
- 1969 Album of the Year – "Okie from Muskogee" – with the Strangers
- 1969 Song of the Year – "Okie from Muskogee" – with the Strangers
- 1969 Single of the Year – "Okie from Muskogee" – with the Strangers
- 1970 Entertainer of the Year
- 1970 Top Male Vocalist
- 1972 Top Male Vocalist
- 1974 Top Male Vocalist
- 1981 Top Male Vocalist
- 1982 Song of the Year – "Are the Good Times Really Over" (won award as both artist and composer)
- 1995 Pioneer Award
- 2005 Triple Crown
- 2008 Poet's Award
- 2013 Crystal Milestone Award

BMI Awards

- 2006 BMI Icon Award

Country Music Association

- 1970 Album of the Year – "Okie from Muskogee" – with the Strangers
- 1970 Entertainer of the Year
- 1970 Male Vocalist of the Year
- 1970 Single of the Year – "Okie from Muskogee" – with the Strangers
- 1972 Album of the Year – "Let Me Tell You About a Song" – with the Strangers
- 1983 Vocal Duo of the Year – with Willie Nelson

Country Music Hall of Fame and Museum

- Inducted in 1994

Grammy Awards

- 1984 Best Country Vocal Performance, Male – "That's The Way Love Goes"
- 1998 Best Country Collaboration with Vocals with Clint Black, Joe Diffie, Emmylou Harris, Alison Krauss, Patty Loveless, Earl Scruggs, Ricky Skaggs, Marty Stuart, Pam Tillis, Randy Travis, Travis Tritt & Dwight Yoakam for "Same Old Train"
- 1999 Grammy Hall of Fame Award – "Mama Tried"
- 2006 Grammy Lifetime Achievement Award

Kennedy Center Honors

- Inducted in 2010

Nashville Songwriters Hall of Fame

- Inducted in 1977

Oklahoma Music Hall of Fame

- Inducted in 1997
