= Billy Mize =

American country music singer-songwriter and TV host (1929–2017)

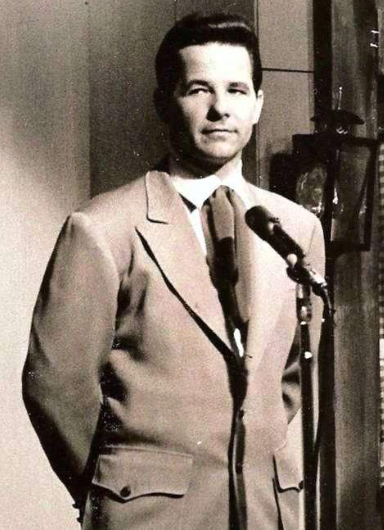
- Billy Mize, 1960s
- Born: William Robert Mize; April 29, 1929; Arkansas City, Kansas, U.S.
- Died: October 29, 2017 (aged 88)
- Occupations: Singer; actor; comedian; television host
- Musical career
- Genres: country
- Instruments: Vocals; steel guitar
- Years active: 1953–2006
- Labels: Decca; Challenge; Liberty; Columbia

William Robert Mize (April 29, 1929 – October 29, 2017) was an American country music singer-songwriter, steel guitarist, band leader, and TV show host.

== Biography ==
Mize was born in Arkansas City, Kansas, United States, but raised in the San Joaquin Valley of California, an area steeped in country music thanks to relocated "Okies". He originally learned to play guitar as a child, but fell in love with the steel guitar he received for his 18th birthday.

Mize moved to Bakersfield, California and formed his own band playing local gigs and also working as a disc jockey on KPMC. In 1953, he, Bill Woods and Herb Henson put together a local TV show called The Cousin Herb Trading Post Show on KERO-TV Bakersfield (then channel 10), where he became affectionately known as Billy The Kid. The signal from that show was so strong the show could be seen as far as Fresno, all the way over to the central coast and Los Angeles. The show was popular because it not only featured fledgling acts such as Buck Owens, Merle Haggard, Tommy Collins, Jean Shepard, Bonnie Owens, Ferlin Husky, but many national acts such as Hank Williams and Patsy Cline. He stayed with the show for thirteen years.

In 1955, Mize began to appear on a local Los Angeles television show hosted by Hank Penny. By 1957, he was working on seven different weekly shows in the LA area, including The Hank Penny Show, The Cal Worthington Show, Country Music Time and Town Hall Party. He recorded for Decca (Solid Sender/It Could happen - 1957), Challenge and Liberty, finally hitting the country charts in 1966 with "You Can't Stop Me" for Columbia.

That same year he began hosting and performing on Gene Autry's Melody Ranch network show on KTLA as well as starting his own syndicated Billy Mize Show from Bakersfield. During the next decade he managed eleven chart hits as well as writing hits for others, such as "Who Will Buy The Wine" (Charlie Walker), "My Baby Walks All Over Me" (Johnny Sea) and "Don't Let The Blues Make You Bad" (Dean Martin). Martin cut three of his songs in one day in June 1966, including "Terrible Tangled Web". Martin recorded Mize's top-40 country hit "Make It Rain" in 1969 as well.

He won the Academy of Country Music's "TV Personality of the Year" award three years in a row between 1965 and 1967.

In 1972, he taped two pilots of the "Billy Mize Music Hall", which he hoped to sell into national syndication but it was not picked up.

A critically acclaimed documentary chronicling the life of Mize and his impact on the country music industry was released in 2015. Directed by William J Saunders and titled Billy Mize and the Bakersfield Sound, it screened at the Los Angeles Film Festival in June 2014.

Mize died on October 29, 2017, at the age of 88.

== Discography ==
- Solid Sender/It Could Happen (Decca, 1957)
- Please Don't Let The Blues Make You Bad (Columbia, 1965)
- You Can't Stop Me (Columbia, 1966)
- It's Gonna Get Lonely (Columbia, 1966)
- Lights Of Albuquerque (Columbia, 1967)
- This Time and Place (Imperial, 1969)
- You're All Right With Me (United Artists, 1971)
- Love'N'Stuff (Zodiac, 1976)
- Billy Mize's Tribute To Swing (G&M, 1986)
- A Salute to Swing (Hag Records, 2006)
- Make it Rain (Sharecropper Records, 2006)

=== Singles ===
Year	Title	Chart positions
Year	Title	US Country
1966	"You Can't Stop Me"	57
1968	"Walking Through the Memories of My Mind"	58
1969	"Make It Rain"	40
1969	"While I'm Thinkin' About It"	43
1970	"Beer Drinking Honky Tonkin' Blues"	49
1970	"If This Was the Last Song"	71
1972	"Take It Easy"	66
1973	"California Is Just Mississippi"	99
1974	"Thank You for the Feeling"	79
1975	"You Can Get By"	-
1976	"It Hurts to Know the Feeling's Gone"	31
1977	"Livin' Her Life in a Song"	68
