= 1973 in country music =

This is a list of notable events in country music that took place in the year 1973.

== Events ==
- July — The Dean Martin Show becomes known as Dean Martin Presents Music Country for the longtime variety show's summer broadcasts. Country music becomes a staple of Martin's show for the 1973–1974 season — its last on the air, as it turns out.
- July 4 — Willie Nelson hosts his first Fourth of July picnic.
- July 14 — Billboard increases the number of positions for its Hot Country Singles chart to 100 (up from 75), which it would keep until January 1990. The expansion comes at a time when the number of No. 1 songs in a given year continues to increase; for the first time in history, there are at least 35 No. 1 songs in one year.
- September — Jimmy Dean's third country music TV series, The Jimmy Dean Show, premieres in syndication for what will be a two-season run.
- October 6 — Country music's most successful syndicated radio countdown program to date, "American Country Countdown," makes its debut. The three-hour program is created by Casey Kasem and Don Bustany, and is modeled after American Top 40 (which Kasem also hosted). Comedian Don Bowman) is the original host, but by 1978, he would be replaced by Bob Kingsley.
- October — The new Radio & Records magazine includes a 50-position country singles chart.
- November 10 — One of Nashville's most notorious murders makes national headlines when David Akeman (aka Stringbean) and his wife, Estelle, are killed when they interrupt a burglary after returning home. Their bodies are found the next day. Their assailants—brothers John and Marvin Douglas—are later captured, convicted and sentenced to prison. Stringbean, who was 58, was best known to his audiences for his role on the syndicated series "Hee Haw."

== Top hits of the year ==
=== Number one hits ===
==== United States ====
(as certified by Billboard)

Date	Single Name	Artist	Wks. No.1	CAN peak	Spec. Note
January 20	Soul Song	Joe Stampley	1	2	^{[A]}
January 27	(Old Dogs, Children And) Watermelon Wine	Tom T. Hall	1
February 3	She Needs Someone to Hold Her (When She Cries)	Conway Twitty	2	8
February 17	I Wonder If They Ever Think of Me	Merle Haggard	1
February 24	Rated "X"	Loretta Lynn	1
March 3	The Lord Knows I'm Drinking	Cal Smith	1	2	^{[A]}
March 10	'Til I Get it Right	Tammy Wynette	1
March 17	The Teddy Bear Song	Barbara Fairchild	2		^{[C]}
March 31	Keep Me in Mind	Lynn Anderson	1
April 7	Super Kind of Woman	Freddie Hart	1
April 14	A Shoulder to Cry On	Charley Pride	1
April 21	Superman	Donna Fargo	1
April 28	Behind Closed Doors	Charlie Rich	2		^{[A]}
May 12	Come Live with Me	Roy Clark	1		^{[C]}
May 19	What's Your Mama's Name	Tanya Tucker	1		^{[A]}
May 26	Satin Sheets	Jeanne Pruett	3	3	^{[2], [C]}: Returned to Number One on June 23.
June 9	You Always Come Back (To Hurting Me)	Johnny Rodriguez	1		^{[A]}
June 16	Kids Say the Darndest Things	Tammy Wynette	1	2
June 30	Don't Fight the Feelings of Love	Charley Pride	1
July 7	Why Me	Kris Kristofferson	1		^{[A]}
July 14	Love Is the Foundation	Loretta Lynn	2
July 28	You Were Always There	Donna Fargo	1
August 4	Lord, Mr. Ford	Jerry Reed	1	2
August 11	Trip to Heaven	Freddie Hart	1		^{[B]}
August 18	Louisiana Woman, Mississippi Man	Conway Twitty and Loretta Lynn	1
August 25	Everybody's Had the Blues	Merle Haggard	2
September 8	You've Never Been This Far Before	Conway Twitty	3		^{[1]}
September 29	Blood Red and Goin' Down	Tanya Tucker	1
October 6	You're the Best Thing That Ever Happened to Me	Ray Price	1	2	^{[B]}
October 13	Ridin' My Thumb to Mexico	Johnny Rodriguez	2
October 27	We're Gonna Hold On	George Jones and Tammy Wynette	2	2
November 10	Paper Roses	Marie Osmond	2		^{[A]}
November 24	The Most Beautiful Girl	Charlie Rich	3
December 15	Amazing Love	Charley Pride	1
December 22	If We Make It Through December	Merle Haggard	4

Notes

- 1 No. 1 song of the year, as determined by Billboard.
- 2 Song dropped from No. 1 and later returned to top spot.
- A First Billboard No. 1 hit for that artist.
- B Last Billboard No. 1 hit for that artist.
- C Only Billboard No. 1 hit for that artist to date.

==== Canada ====
(as certified by RPM)

Date	Single Name	Artist	Wks. No.1	U.S. peak	Spec. Note
January 13	Love's the Answer	Tanya Tucker	1	5	^{[A]}
January 20	(Old Dogs, Children And) Watermelon Wine	Tom T. Hall	1		^{[A]}
January 27	Danny's Song	Anne Murray	1	10
February 3	I Wonder If They Ever Think of Me	Merle Haggard	1
February 10	Rated "X"	Loretta Lynn	2
February 24	'Til I Get it Right	Tammy Wynette	1
March 3	Any Old Wind That Blows	Johnny Cash	2	3
March 17	The Teddy Bear Song	Barbara Fairchild	2		^{[A]}
March 31	Keep Me in Mind	Lynn Anderson	2
April 14	Super Kind of Woman	Freddie Hart	1
April 21	A Shoulder to Cry On	Charley Pride	1
April 28	Superman	Donna Fargo	1
May 5	Behind Closed Doors	Charlie Rich	1		^{[A]}
May 12	Nobody Wins	Brenda Lee	1	5	^{[C]}
May 19	Come Live with Me	Roy Clark	1		^{[A]}
May 26	What's Your Mama's Name	Tanya Tucker	1
June 2	Dirty Old Man	George Hamilton IV	2	38	^{[B]}
June 16	Tie a Yellow Ribbon Round the Ole Oak Tree	Johnny Carver	1	5	^{[C]}
June 23	You Always Come Back (To Hurting Me)	Johnny Rodriguez	1		^{[A]}
June 30	Don't Fight the Feelings of Love	Charley Pride	3		^{[2]}: Fell to #3 on the week of July 7.
July 7	Ravishing Ruby	Tom T. Hall	1	3
July 14	Why Me	Kris Kristofferson	1		^{[A]}
July 21	Love Is the Foundation	Loretta Lynn	1
August 11	You Were Always There	Donna Fargo	1
August 18	Top of the World	Lynn Anderson	2	2
September 1	Trip to Heaven	Freddie Hart	1
September 8	Louisiana Woman, Mississippi Man	Conway Twitty and Loretta Lynn	2
September 22	Everybody's Had the Blues	Merle Haggard	1
September 29	The Corner of My Life	Bill Anderson	1	2
October 6	You've Never Been This Far Before	Conway Twitty	2
October 20	Blood Red and Goin' Down	Tanya Tucker	1
October 27	Kid Stuff	Barbara Fairchild	1	2	^{[B]}
November 3	Rednecks, White Socks and Blue Ribbon Beer	Johnny Russell	2	4	^{[C]}
November 17	Ridin' My Thumb to Mexico	Johnny Rodriguez	1
November 24	Paper Roses	Marie Osmond	2		^{[A]}
December 8	The Most Beautiful Girl	Charlie Rich	4

Notes

- 2 Song dropped from No. 1 and later returned to top spot.
- A First RPM No. 1 hit for that artist.
- B Last RPM No. 1 hit for that artist.
- C Only RPM No. 1 hit for that artist.

=== Other major hits ===
==== Singles released by American artists ====
US	CAN	Single	Artist
22	19	Afraid I'll Want to Love Her One More Time	Billy "Crash" Craddock
23	10	After You	Hank Williams, Jr.
14	7	Ain't It Amazing Gracie	Buck Owens
13	63	All in the Name of Love	Narvel Felts
16	4	Always on My Mind	Elvis Presley
12	9	Am I That Easy to Forget	Jim Reeves
2	2	Baby's Gone	Conway Twitty
22	5	Blue Train (Of the Heartbreak Line)	George Hamilton IV
7	4	Bring It on Home (To Your Woman)	Joe Stampley
15	11	Broad-Minded Man	Jim Ed Brown
6	4	Can I Sleep in Your Arms	Jeannie Seely
26	9	Carry Me Back	The Statler Brothers
12	3	Catfish John	Johnny Russell
18	20	Cheating Game	Susan Raye
30	15	Children	Johnny Cash
12	—	Come Early Morning	Don Williams
2	9	Country Sunshine	Dottie West
33	18	Daisy a Day	Jud Strunk
5	3	Darling, You Can Always Come Back Home	Jody Miller
2	4	Do You Know What It's Like to Be Lonesome	Jerry Wallace
3	12	Don't Give Up on Me	Jerry Wallace
8	48	Drift Away	Narvel Felts
20	12	Drinking Wine Spo-Dee-O-Dee	Jerry Lee Lewis
5	9	Dueling Banjos	Eric Weissberg and Steve Mandell
3	12	The Emptiest Arms in the World	Merle Haggard
9	9	Good News	Jody Miller
2	3	Good Things	David Houston
14	36	Got Leaving on Her Mind	Nat Stuckey
12	14	Hank	Hank Williams, Jr.
14	20	Hello We're Lonely	Patti Page and Tom T. Hall
17	13	Honky Tonk Wine	Wayne Kemp
12	11	I Can't Believe That It's All Over	Skeeter Davis
10	14	I Hate You	Ronnie Milsap
4	3	I Love You More and More Everyday	Sonny James
11	3	I Need Somebody Bad	Jack Greene
16	—	I Recall a Gypsy Woman	Tommy Cash
22	14	I Used It All on You	Nat Stuckey
24	16	I Wish (You Had Stayed)	Brian Collins
7	10	I'll Never Break These Chains	Tommy Overstreet
8	8	I'm Your Woman	Jeanne Pruett
15	11	If She Just Helps Me Get Over You	Sonny James
3	5	If Teardrops Were Pennies	Porter Wagoner and Dolly Parton
2	2	If You Can Live with It (I Can Live Without It)	Bill Anderson
3	5	If You Can't Feel It (It Ain't There)	Freddie Hart
26	9	If You're Goin' Girl	Don Gibson
22	16	It'll Be Her	David Rogers
20	22	It's a Man's World (If You Had a Man Like Mine)	Diana Trask
17	18	Just Thank Me	David Rogers
9	9	Just What I Had in Mind	Faron Young
19	10	Keep on Truckin'	Dave Dudley
3	4	Last Love Song	Hank Williams, Jr.
7	11	Let Me Be There	Olivia Newton-John
17	12	Lila	Doyle Holly
2	2	Little Girl Gone	Donna Fargo
8	6	Love Is the Look You're Looking for	Connie Smith
9	3	Love Me	Marty Robbins
17	18	Love Sure Feels Good in My Heart	Susan Raye
5	8	Lovin' on Back Streets	Mel Street
7	5	The Midnight Oil	Barbara Mandrell
20	10	Monday Morning Secretary	The Statler Brothers
2	3	Mr. Lovemaker	Johnny Paycheck
15	10	My Tennessee Mountain Home	Dolly Parton
7	17	Neither One of Us	Bob Luman
3	3	Neon Rose	Mel Tillis
19	3	No More Hanging On	Jerry Lee Lewis
7	8	Nothing Ever Hurt Me (Half as Bad as Losing You)	George Jones
33	17	One Last Time	Glen Campbell
14	8	Open Up Your Heart	Roger Miller
9	7	Pass Me By (If You're Only Passing Through)	Johnny Rodriguez
13	7	The Perfect Stranger	Freddy Weller
11	4	Ride Me Down Easy	Bobby Bare
17	12	Satisfaction	Jack Greene
2	5	Sawmill	Mel Tillis
15	8	Say When	Diana Trask
50	5	Second Cup of Coffee	George Hamilton IV
7	10	Send Me No Roses	Tommy Overstreet
15	6	She Fights That Lovin' Feeling	Faron Young
11	3	She Loves Me (Right Out of My Mind)	Freddy Weller
3	6	She's All Woman	David Houston
20	43	She's My Rock	Stoney Edwards
14	—	The Shelter of Your Eyes	Don Williams
3	3	Sing About Love	Lynn Anderson
14	13	Slippin' and Slidin'	Billy "Crash" Craddock
4	3	Slippin' Away	Jean Shepard
28	15	So Many Ways	Eddy Arnold
10	20	Something About You I Love	Johnny Paycheck
6	6	Sometimes a Memory Ain't Enough	Jerry Lee Lewis
21	16	Sound of Goodbye	Jerry Wallace
6	6	Southern Loving	Jim Ed Brown
31	20	Steamroller Blues/Fool	Elvis Presley
6	8	Sunday Sunrise	Brenda Lee
6	8	Sweet Country Woman	Johnny Duncan
10	14	Take Time to Love Her	Nat Stuckey
18	42	Talkin' with My Lady	Johnny Duncan
21	12	Thank You for Being You	Mel Tillis
8	18	'Till the Water Stops Runnin'	Billy "Crash" Craddock
12	23	Too Far Gone	Joe Stampley
8	7	Too Much Monkey Business	Freddy Weller
6	5	Touch the Morning	Don Gibson
20	12	Travelin' Man	Dolly Parton
11	6	Walk Softly on the Bridges	Mel Street
6	5	Walking Piece of Heaven	Marty Robbins
16	20	Watergate Blues	Tom T. Hall
28	17	We Had It All	Waylon Jennings
6	—	What My Woman Can't Do	George Jones
32	17	When a Man Loves a Woman (The Way That I Love You)	Tony Booth
20	30	Wherefore and Why	Glen Campbell
13	38	Whole World's Making Love Again Tonight	Bobby G. Rice
13	11	You Ain't Gonna Have Ol' Buck to Kick Around No More	Buck Owens
8	8	You Ask Me To	Waylon Jennings
7	2	You Can Have Her	Waylon Jennings
8	8	You Give Me You	Bobby G. Rice
30	13	You Know Who	Bobby Bare
3	7	You Lay So Easy on My Mind	Bobby G. Rice
6	11	You Really Haven't Changed	Johnny Carver
18	8	You Took All the Ramblin' Out of Me	Jerry Reed
36	19	Your Side of the Bed	Mac Davis

==== Singles released by Canadian artists ====
US	CAN	Single	Artist
—	20	All Them Irons in the Fire	Carroll Baker
—	12	Blind Jonathon/Make It Over the Hill	Dianne Leigh
—	18	But Tomorrow There's Another Day	Hank Smith
—	5	Carpenter of Wood	Cliff Edwards
—	18	Champlain and St. Lawrence Line	Orval Prophet
—	8	The Farmer's Song	Murray McLauchlan
—	16	The Feeling's Too Strong	Family Brown
—	13	Flying East	Sharon Lowness
—	19	Going Home to the Country	Dick Damron
—	19	Highway Driving	Alabama
—	4	It's So Easy to Please Me	Mercey Brothers
—	12	It's Worth Believin'	Gordon Lightfoot
—	15	Judgment Day Express	Orval Prophet
—	19	Meant to Be with Me	Mercey Brothers
71	20	North to Chicago	Hank Snow
—	15	Old Ira Gray	Dallas Harms
—	14	Pictou County Jail	Jim and Don Haggart
—	20	The Prisoner	Shannon Two Feathers
79	10	Send a Little Love My Way	Anne Murray
—	18	Too Many Memories	Joe Firth
20	2	What About Me	Anne Murray
46	5	What Got to You (Before It Got to Me)	Ray Griff
—	16	The World I Know Is Now	Carroll Baker

== Top new album releases ==
Album	Artist	Record Label
Bill	Bill Anderson	MCA
Bubbling Over	Dolly Parton	RCA
Can I Sleep in Your Arms/Lucky Ladies	Jeannie Seely	MCA
Country Sunshine	Dottie West	RCA
Entertainer of the Year	Loretta Lynn	Decca
Full Moon	Kris Kristofferson and Rita Coolidge	A&M
Good News!	Jody Miller	Epic
Honky Tonk Heroes	Waylon Jennings	RCA
Kid Stuff	Barbara Fairchild	Columbia
Louisiana Woman, Mississippi Man	Conway Twitty and Loretta Lynn	MCA
Love and Music	Porter Wagoner and Dolly Parton	RCA
Love Is the Foundation	Loretta Lynn	MCA
My Second Album	Donna Fargo	Dot
My Tennessee Mountain Home	Dolly Parton	RCA
Satin Sheets	Jeanne Pruett	MCA
Slippin' Away	Jean Shepard	United Artists
Shotgun Willie	Willie Nelson	Atlantic
Top of the World	Lynn Anderson	Columbia
We Found It	Porter Wagoner and Dolly Parton	RCA
What's Your Mama's Name	Tanya Tucker	Columbia

=== Other top new albums ===
Album	Artist	Record Label
Brenda	Brenda Lee	MCA
Cheating Game	Susan Raye	Capitol
Country Keepsakes	Wanda Jackson	Capitol
Daisy a Day	Jud Strunk	MGM
Entertainer of the Year - Loretta	Loretta Lynn	MCA
It's a Man's World	Diana Trask	Dot
Keep Me in Mind	Lynn Anderson	Columbia
Let Me Be There	Olivia Newton-John	MCA
The Midnight Oil	Barbara Mandrell	Columbia
New Sunrise	Brenda Lee	MCA
Rub it In	Billy "Crash" Craddock	ABC-Dot
Where My Heart Is	Ronnie Milsap	RCA

== Births ==
- March 6 — Trent Willmon, rising country music star of the early- to mid-2000s (decade).
- May 24 — Jill Johnson, Swedish female country singer.
- June 6 — Lisa Brokop, Canadian country star of the 1990s and early-2000s (decade).
- June 26 — Gretchen Wilson, singer-songwriter and key member of the MuzikMafia of the 2000s (decade).
- July 29 — James Otto, rising male vocalist of the 2000s (decade).
- August 8 — Mark Wills, country star of the mid-to-late-1990s and early-2000s (decade) ("19 Somethin'", "Wish You Were Here").
- August 13 — Andy Griggs, country music star of late-1990s and early-2000s (decade).
- November 19 — Billy Currington, rising star of the mid-2000s (decade).

== Deaths ==
- March 26 – Don Messer, 63, Canadian fiddler and folk music icon whose career spanned 40 years (heart attack).
- September 19 — Gram Parsons, 26, influential country rock and alt-country singer-songwriter-guitarist who was a member of such bands as The Byrds and The Flying Burrito Brothers, and also recorded a critically acclaimed body of solo recordings (drug overdose).
- November 10 — Stringbean, 58, banjo player and comedian on the TV series Hee Haw (homicide).

== Country Music Hall of Fame Inductees ==
- Chet Atkins (1924–2001)
- Patsy Cline (1932–1963), first female to be inducted as a solo act.

== Major awards ==
=== Grammy Awards ===
- Best Female Country Vocal Performance — "Let Me Be There", Olivia Newton-John
- Best Male Country Vocal Performance —c"Behind Closed Doors", Charlie Rich
- Best Country Performance by a Duo or Group with Vocal — "From the Bottle to the Bottom", Kris Kristofferson and Rita Coolidge
- Best Country Instrumental Performance — "Dueling Banjos", Eric Weissberg and Steve Mandell
- Best Country Song — "Behind Closed Doors", Kenny O'Dell (Performer: Charlie Rich)

=== Juno Awards ===
- Country Male Vocalist of the Year — Stompin' Tom Connors
- Country Female Vocalist of the Year — Shirley Eikhard
- Country Group or Duo of the Year — Mercey Brothers

=== Academy of Country Music ===
- Entertainer of the Year — Roy Clark
- Song of the Year — "Behind Closed Doors", Kenny O'Dell (Performer: Charlie Rich)
- Single of the Year — "Behind Closed Doors", Charlie Rich
- Album of the Year — Behind Closed Doors, Charlie Rich
- Top Male Vocalist — Charlie Rich
- Top Female Vocalist — Loretta Lynn
- Top Vocal Group — Brush Arbor
- Top New Male Vocalist — Dorsey Burnette
- Top New Female Vocalist — Olivia Newton-John

=== Country Music Association ===
- Entertainer of the Year — Roy Clark
- Song of the Year — "Behind Closed Doors", Kenny O'Dell (Performer: Charlie Rich)
- Single of the Year — "Behind Closed Doors", Charlie Rich
- Album of the Year — Behind Closed Doors, Charlie Rich
- Male Vocalist of the Year — Charlie Rich
- Female Vocalist of the Year — Loretta Lynn
- Vocal Duo of the Year — Conway Twitty and Loretta Lynn
- Vocal Group of the Year — The Statler Brothers
- Instrumentalist of the Year — Charlie McCoy
- Instrumental Group of the Year — Danny Davis and the Nashville Brass

== Other links ==
- Country Music Association
- Inductees of the Country Music Hall of Fame
