= List of RPM number-one country singles of 1973 =

These are the Canadian number-one country songs of 1973, per the RPM Country Tracks chart.

Issue date	Title	Artist
January 13	Love's the Answer	Tanya Tucker
January 20	(Old Dogs, Children And) Watermelon Wine	Tom T. Hall
January 27	Danny's Song	Anne Murray
February 3	I Wonder If They Ever Think of Me	Merle Haggard
February 10	Rated "X"	Loretta Lynn
February 17	Rated "X"	Loretta Lynn
February 24	'Til I Get it Right	Tammy Wynette
March 3	Any Old Wind That Blows	Johnny Cash
March 10	Any Old Wind That Blows	Johnny Cash
March 17	The Teddy Bear Song	Barbara Fairchild
March 24	The Teddy Bear Song	Barbara Fairchild
March 31	Keep Me in Mind	Lynn Anderson
April 7	Keep Me in Mind	Lynn Anderson
April 14	Super Kind of Woman	Freddie Hart
April 21	A Shoulder to Cry On	Charley Pride
April 28	Superman	Donna Fargo
May 5	Behind Closed Doors	Charlie Rich
May 12	Nobody Wins	Brenda Lee
May 19	Come Live with Me	Roy Clark
May 26	What's Your Mama's Name	Tanya Tucker
June 2	Dirty Old Man	George Hamilton IV
June 9	Dirty Old Man	George Hamilton IV
June 16	Tie a Yellow Ribbon Round the Ole Oak Tree	Johnny Carver
June 23	You Always Come Back to Hurting Me	Johnny Rodriguez
June 30	Don't Fight the Feelings of Love	Charley Pride
July 7	Ravishing Ruby	Tom T. Hall
July 14	Why Me	Kris Kristofferson
July 21	Love Is the Foundation	Loretta Lynn
July 28	Don't Fight the Feelings of Love	Charley Pride
August 4	Don't Fight the Feelings of Love	Charley Pride
August 11	You Were Always There	Donna Fargo
August 18	Top of the World	Lynn Anderson
August 25	Top of the World	Lynn Anderson
September 1	Trip to Heaven	Freddie Hart
September 8	Louisiana Woman, Mississippi Man	Conway Twitty and Loretta Lynn
September 15	Louisiana Woman, Mississippi Man	Conway Twitty and Loretta Lynn
September 22	Everybody's Had the Blues	Merle Haggard
September 29	The Corner of My Life	Bill Anderson
October 6	You've Never Been This Far Before	Conway Twitty
October 13	You've Never Been This Far Before	Conway Twitty
October 20	Blood Red and Goin' Down	Tanya Tucker
October 27	Kid Stuff	Barbara Fairchild
November 3	Rednecks, White Socks and Blue Ribbon Beer	Johnny Russell
November 10	Rednecks, White Socks and Blue Ribbon Beer	Johnny Russell
November 17	Ridin' My Thumb to Mexico	Johnny Rodriguez
November 24	Paper Roses	Marie Osmond
December 1	Paper Roses	Marie Osmond
December 8	The Most Beautiful Girl	Charlie Rich
December 15	The Most Beautiful Girl	Charlie Rich
December 22	The Most Beautiful Girl	Charlie Rich
December 29	The Most Beautiful Girl	Charlie Rich

== See also ==
- 1973 in music
- List of number-one country hits of 1973 (U.S.)
