= List of Hot Country Singles number ones of 1973 =

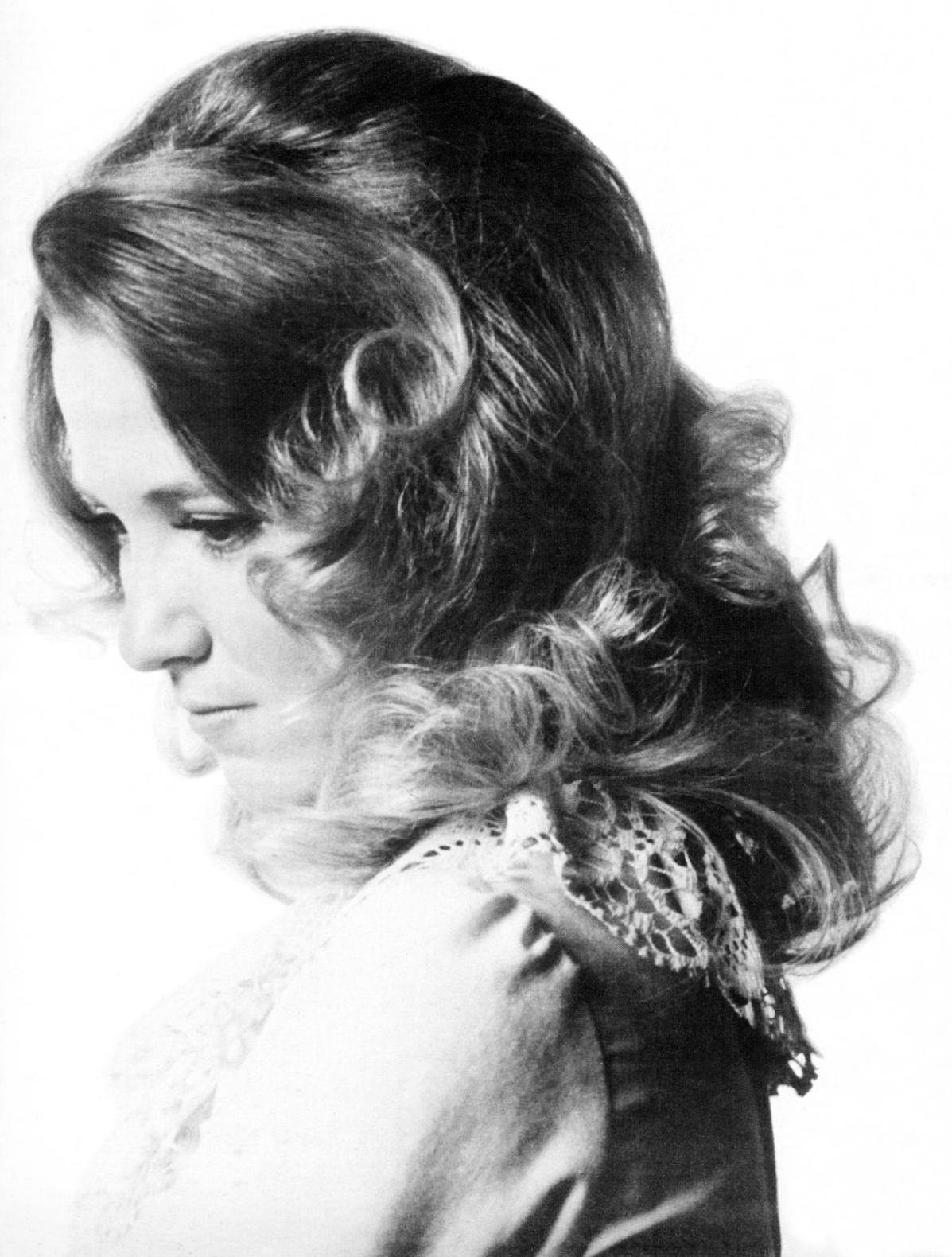
Tanya Tucker had her first chart-topper in 1973 at the age of 14.

Hot Country Songs is a record chart that ranks the top-performing country music songs in the United States, published by Billboard magazine. In 1973, 36 different singles topped the chart, at the time published under the title Hot Country Singles, in 52 issues of the magazine. Chart placings were based on playlists submitted by country music radio stations and sales reports submitted by stores.

At the start of the year, the number one song was "She's Got to Be a Saint" by Ray Price, which had reached number one the previous week, and remained atop the chart for two weeks in 1973. Price returned to the top spot for a single week later in the year with "You're the Best Thing That Ever Happened to Me". This marked his final appearance at the top of the Hot Country Singles chart, fifteen years after he had been at number one on the very first combined country sales and airplay chart published by Billboard. Conway Twitty spent the highest number of weeks at number one by any artist in 1973 with six, including one week at the top with a duet with Loretta Lynn. Twitty and Lynn had a run of success with duet recordings in the early 1970s alongside their ongoing solo careers, and each had three number one singles during the year, tying with Charley Pride, Tammy Wynette and Merle Haggard for the most number ones by an artist. Despite being banned by some radio stations due to its lyrical content, Twitty's "You've Never Been This Far Before" spent three weeks at number one, tying for the longest unbroken run of the year with "The Most Beautiful Girl" by Charlie Rich.

Artists to reach number one for the first time in 1973 included Tanya Tucker, who took "What's Your Mama's Name" to the top spot at the age of 14. Later in the year, another 14-year old, Marie Osmond, reached the top spot with "Paper Roses". She became the first female solo artist to top the chart with her debut single and set a new record as the youngest female artist to top the chart. A number of other artists achieved a first country number one in 1973. Joe Stampley was the first when he spent one week at the top of the chart with "Soul Song" in January. In March, Cal Smith topped the chart for the first time with "The Lord Knows I'm Drinking", as did Barbara Fairchild with "The Teddy Bear Song". In April, Charlie Rich gained his first number one with "Behind Closed Doors", beginning a run of five consecutive first-time chart-toppers which also included Roy Clark with "Come Live with Me", Tucker's "What's Your Mama's Name", "Satin Sheets" by Jeanne Pruett, and Johnny Rodriguez's "You Always Come Back to Hurting Me". In July, Kris Kristofferson, who had written a number of major hits including "Me and Bobby McGee", which had topped the Billboard Hot 100 for Janis Joplin, achieved his only number one as a solo performer with "Why Me". The final number one of the year was the aptly-titled "If We Make It Through December" by Merle Haggard.

== Chart history ==
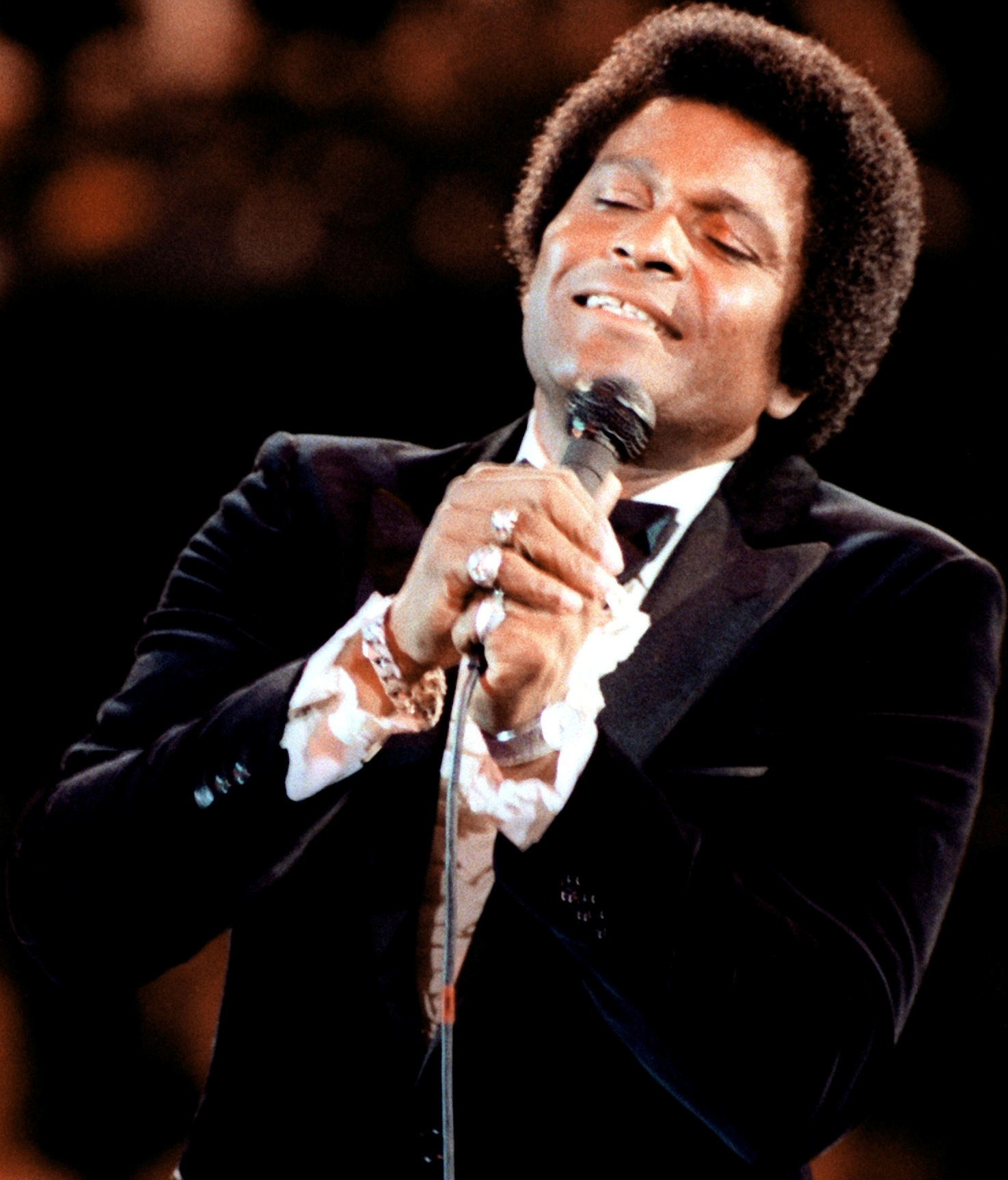
Charley Pride had three number ones in 1973.

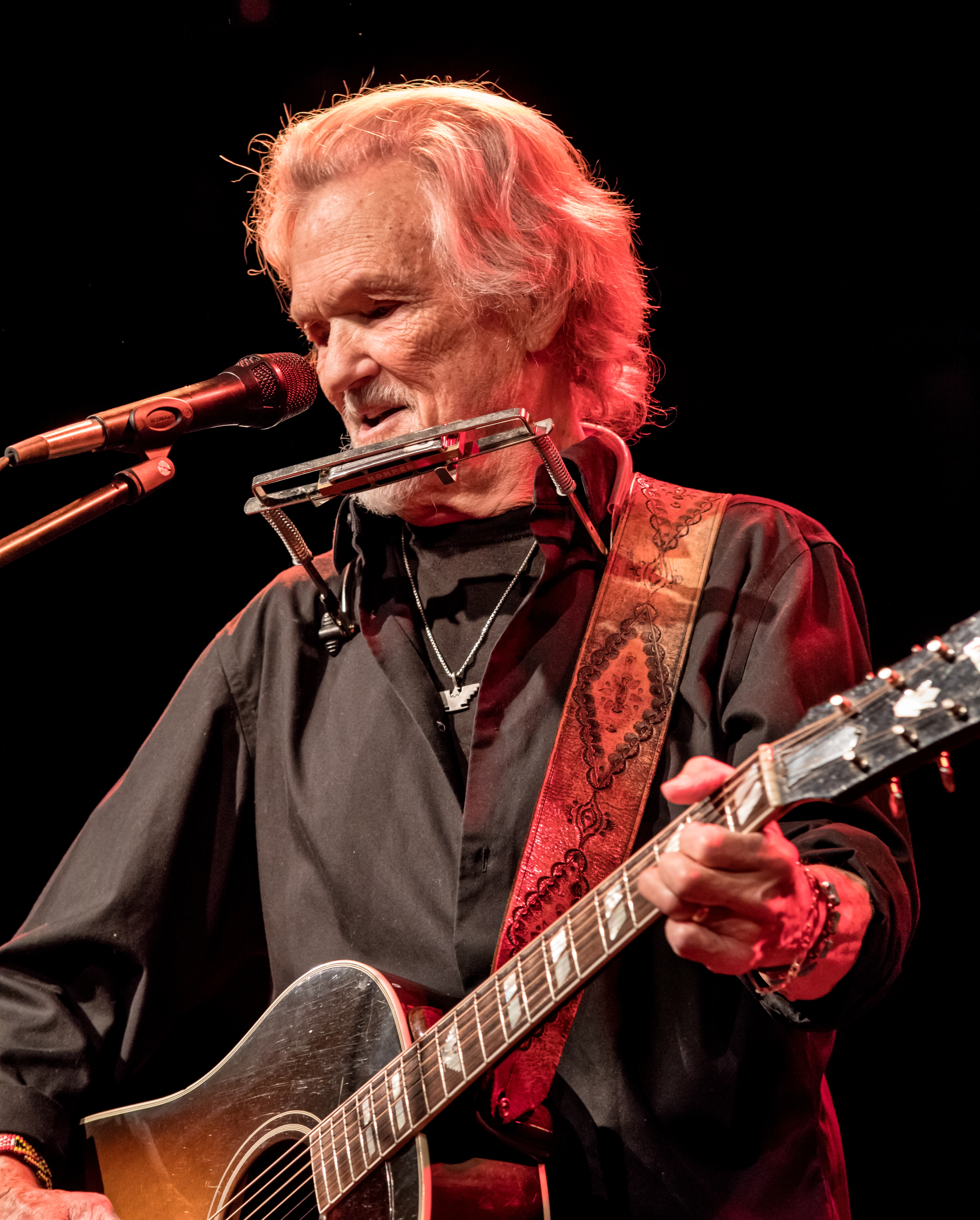
Kris Kristofferson (pictured in 2017) had already achieved considerable success as a songwriter for other acts, but in 1973 he gained his only number one as a solo singer.

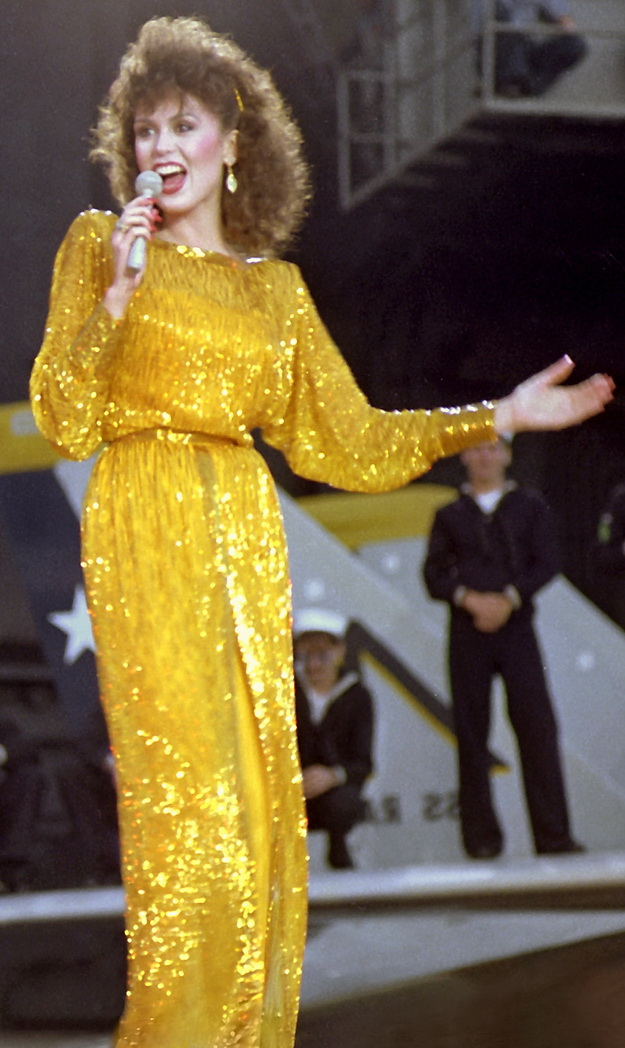
Marie Osmond (pictured in 1981) became the youngest female singer to top the Hot Country chart.

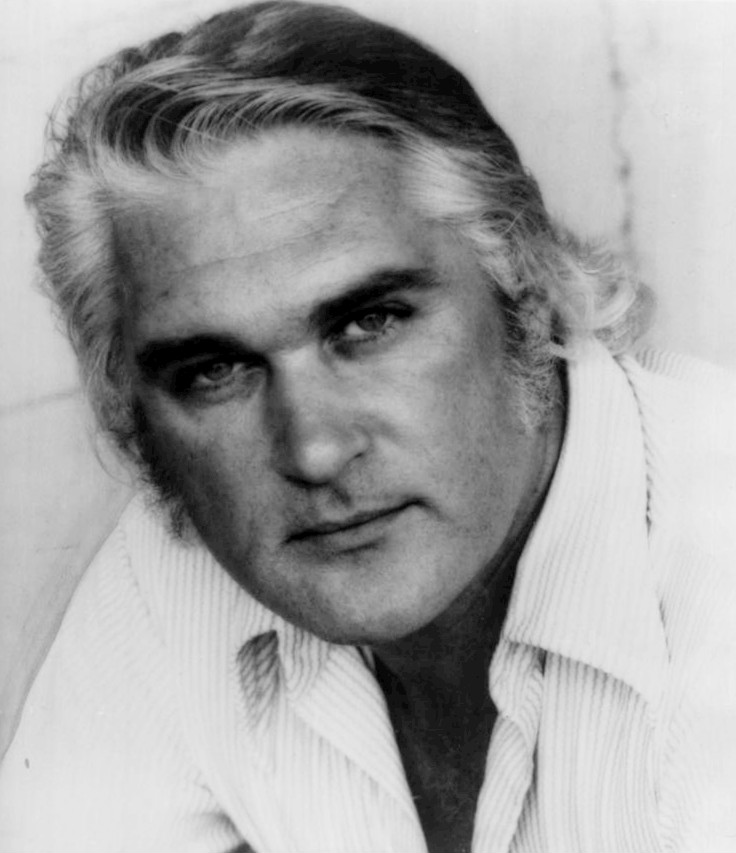
Charlie Rich's "The Most Beautiful Girl" was not only a country number one but also topped the magazine's all-genre chart, the Hot 100.

| Issue date | Title | Artist(s) | Ref. |
|---|---|---|---|
| January 6 | "She's Got to Be a Saint" | Ray Price | |
| January 13 | "She's Got to Be a Saint" | Ray Price | |
| January 20 | "Soul Song" | Joe Stampley | |
| January 27 | "(Old Dogs, Children and) Watermelon Wine" | Tom T. Hall | |
| February 3 | "She Needs Someone to Hold Her (When She Cries)" | Conway Twitty | |
| February 10 | "She Needs Someone to Hold Her (When She Cries)" | Conway Twitty | |
| February 17 | "I Wonder If They Ever Think of Me" | Merle Haggard | |
| February 24 | "Rated "X"" | Loretta Lynn | |
| March 3 | "The Lord Knows I'm Drinking" | Cal Smith | |
| March 10 | "'Til I Get It Right" | Tammy Wynette | |
| March 17 | "The Teddy Bear Song" | Barbara Fairchild | |
| March 24 | "The Teddy Bear Song" | Barbara Fairchild | |
| March 31 | "Keep Me in Mind" | Lynn Anderson | |
| April 7 | "Super Kind of Woman" | Freddie Hart | |
| April 14 | "A Shoulder to Cry On" | Charley Pride | |
| April 21 | "Superman" | Donna Fargo | |
| April 28 | "Behind Closed Doors" | Charlie Rich | |
| May 5 | "Behind Closed Doors" | Charlie Rich | |
| May 12 | "Come Live with Me" | Roy Clark | |
| May 19 | "What's Your Mama's Name" | Tanya Tucker | |
| May 26 | "Satin Sheets" | Jeanne Pruett | |
| June 2 | "Satin Sheets" | Jeanne Pruett | |
| June 9 | "You Always Come Back to Hurting Me" | Johnny Rodriguez | |
| June 16 | "Kids Say the Darndest Things" | Tammy Wynette | |
| June 23 | "Satin Sheets" | Jeanne Pruett | |
| June 30 | "Don't Fight the Feelings of Love" | Charley Pride | |
| July 7 | "Why Me" | Kris Kristofferson | |
| July 14 | "Love Is the Foundation" | Loretta Lynn | |
| July 21 | "Love Is the Foundation" | Loretta Lynn | |
| July 28 | "You Were Always There" | Donna Fargo | |
| August 4 | "Lord, Mr. Ford" | Jerry Reed | |
| August 11 | "Trip to Heaven" | Freddie Hart | |
| August 18 | "Louisiana Woman, Mississippi Man" | Loretta Lynn & Conway Twitty | |
| August 25 | "Everybody's Had the Blues" | Merle Haggard | |
| September 1 | "Everybody's Had the Blues" | Merle Haggard | |
| September 8 | "You've Never Been This Far Before" | Conway Twitty | |
| September 15 | "You've Never Been This Far Before" | Conway Twitty | |
| September 22 | "You've Never Been This Far Before" | Conway Twitty | |
| September 29 | "Blood Red and Goin' Down" | Tanya Tucker | |
| October 6 | "You're the Best Thing That Ever Happened to Me" | Ray Price | |
| October 13 | "Ridin' My Thumb to Mexico" | Johnny Rodriguez | |
| October 20 | "Ridin' My Thumb to Mexico" | Johnny Rodriguez | |
| October 27 | "We're Gonna Hold On" | George Jones & Tammy Wynette | |
| November 3 | "We're Gonna Hold On" | George Jones & Tammy Wynette | |
| November 10 | "Paper Roses" | Marie Osmond | |
| November 17 | "Paper Roses" | Marie Osmond | |
| November 24 | "The Most Beautiful Girl" | Charlie Rich | |
| December 1 | "The Most Beautiful Girl" | Charlie Rich | |
| December 8 | "The Most Beautiful Girl" | Charlie Rich | |
| December 15 | "Amazing Love" | Charley Pride | |
| December 22 | "If We Make It Through December" | Merle Haggard | |
| December 29 | "If We Make It Through December" | Merle Haggard | |

== See also ==
- 1973 in music
- List of artists who reached number one on the U.S. country chart
