= Barbara Fairchild discography =

This is the discography for American country music singer Barbara Fairchild.

== Albums ==
Year	Album	US Country
1970	Someone Special	—
1971	Love's Old Song	31
1972	A Sweeter Love	17
1973	Kid Stuff	14
1974	Love Is a Gentle Thing	33
1974	Standing in Your Line	29
1975	Barbara Fairchild	—
1976	Mississippi	49
1977	Free and Easy	48
1978	Greatest Hits	—
1979	This Is Me!	—
1980	Bye Bye Love (with Billy Walker)	—
1982	The Biggest Hurt	—
1991	The Light	—
1993	Son in My Eyes	—
1995	Stories	—
1995	Hymns That Last Forever	—
1998	Classic Country	—
1999	Rocky Top	—
2000	Then and Now	—
2000	All Is Forgiven (with Roy Morris)	—
2001	For God and Country (with Roy Morris)	—
2002	Wings of a Dove	—
2003	Love Never Fails (with Connie Smith & Sharon White)	—
2003	Forever Friend	—
2006	He Kept On Loving Me	—

== Singles ==
Year	Title	Peak positions					Album
Year	Title	US Country	US	CAN Country	CAN	CAN AC	Album
1969	"Love Is a Gentle Thing"	69	—	—	—	—	Someone Special
1969	"A Woman's Hand"	66	—	—	—	—	Someone Special
1970	"A Girl Who'll Satisfy Her Man"	26	—	—	—	—	Someone Special
1970	"Find Out What's Happenin'"	52	—	—	—	—	Someone Special
1971	"(Loving You Is) Sunshine"	33	—	48	—	—	Love's Old Song
1971	"What Do You Do"	62	—	—	—	—	—N/a
1971	"Love's Old Song"	28	—	—	—	—	Love's Old Song
1972	"Color My World"	38	—	—	—	—	Love's Old Song
1972	"Thanks for the Mem'ries"	29	—	—	—	—	A Sweeter Love
1972	"A Sweeter Love (I'll Never Know)"	53	—	—	—	—	A Sweeter Love
1972	"The Teddy Bear Song"	1	32	1	42	24	A Sweeter Love
1973	"Kid Stuff"	2	95	1	—	72	Kid Stuff
1974	"Baby Doll"	6	—	2	—	—	Kid Stuff
1974	"Standing in Your Line"	17	—	—	—	—	Standing in Your Line
1974	"Little Girl Feeling"	31	—	—	—	—	—N/a
1975	"Let's Love While We Can"	52	—	—	—	—	Barbara Fairchild
1975	"You've Lost That Lovin' Feelin'"	41	—	—	—	—	Barbara Fairchild
1975	"I Just Love Being a Woman"	63	—	—	—	—	Barbara Fairchild
1976	"Under Your Spell Again"	65	—	—	—	—	Mississippi
1976	"Mississippi"	31	—	—	—	—	Mississippi
1976	"Cheatin' Is"	15	—	—	—	—	Mississippi
1977	"Let Me Love You Once Before You Go"	22	—	32	—	—	Mississippi
1977	"For All the Right Reasons"	49	—	—	—	—	Free and Easy
1978	"The Other Side of the Morning"	72	—	—	—	—	Free and Easy
1978	"She Can't Give It Away"	96	—	—	—	—	Free and Easy
1978	"It's Sad to Go to the Funeral (Of a Good Love That Has Died)"	91	—	—	—	—	This Is Me!
1982	"The Biggest Hurt"	—	—	—	—	—	The Biggest Hurt
1986	"Just Riding Around"	84	—	—	—	—	—N/a
1986	"All My Cloudy Days Are Gone"	—	—	—	—	—	—N/a
1987	"Too Much Love"	—	—	—	—	—	—N/a
2006	"He Kept On Loving Me"	—	—	—	—	—	He Kept On Loving Me
"—" denotes releases that did not chart

=== Collaboration singles ===
Year	Title	Artist	Peak positions	Album
Year	Title	Artist	US Country	Album
1980	"Let Me Be the One"	Billy Walker	74	Bye Bye Love
1980	"Bye Bye Love"	Billy Walker	70	Bye Bye Love
1980	"Love's Slipping Through our Fingers"	Billy Walker	79	Bye Bye Love
2003	"Closer to Home"	Connie Smith and Sharon White	—	Love Never Fails
2004	"Love Never Fails"	Connie Smith and Sharon White	—	Love Never Fails
"—" denotes releases that did not chart
