= Delta Dawn (album) =

Studio album by Tanya Tucker
- Released: September 11, 1972
- Recorded: March–July 1972
- Studios: Columbia (Nashville, Tennessee)
- Genre: Country
- Length: 28:08
- Label: Columbia
- Producer: Billy Sherrill

Tanya Tucker chronology
| Delta Dawn (1972) | What's Your Mama's Name (1973) |

Singles from Delta Dawn
- 1. "Delta Dawn" Released: April 10, 1972; 2. "Love's the Answer/The Jamestown Ferry" Released: October 30, 1972

Delta Dawn is the debut studio album by American country music singer Tanya Tucker. It was released on September 11, 1972, by Columbia Records. The album was produced by Billy Sherrill and includes two top ten singles, "Delta Dawn" and "Love's the Answer"/"The Jamestown Ferry".

== Critical reception ==
The review published in the September 23, 1972, issue of Cashbox said, "We've already seen Tanya Tucker breeze up the country and pop singles charts with "Delta Dawn", establishing herself as country music's first thirteen-year-old superstar. Now this album will establish her versatility, a talent necessary for longevity, since even thirteen-year-olds grow up someday. Tanya Tucker won't always be a child star, but if this album is an indication, she'll always be a star." The review also noted "Soul Song", "I'm So Lonesome I Could Cry", and "Love's the Answer" as the best cuts on the album.

== Commercial performance ==
The album peaked at No. 32 on the US Billboard Hot Country LP's chart.

The album's first single, "Delta Dawn", was released in April 1972 and peaked at No. 6 on the US Billboard Hot Country Singles chart and No. 72 on the US Billboard Hot 100. In Canada, the single peaked at No. 3 on the RPM Country Singles chart. The album's second single, "Love's the Answer", was released in October 1972 and peaked at No. 5 on the US Billboard Hot Country Singles chart with its B-side, "The Jamestown Ferry". In Canada, the single peaked at No. 1 on the RPM Country Singles chart.

== Track listing ==
Side one
| No. | Title | Writer(s) | Length |
|---|---|---|---|
| 1. | "Delta Dawn" | Alex Harvey; Larry Collins | 2:52 |
| 2. | "New York City Song" | Linda Hargrove | 2:27 |
| 3. | "Smell the Flowers" | Jerry Reed | 2:23 |
| 4. | "If You Touch Me (You've Got to Love Me)" | Carmol Taylor; Norro Wilson; Joe Stampley | 2:18 |
| 5. | "He's All I Got" | Jerry Williams; Gary U.S. Bonds | 2:23 |

Side two
| No. | Title | Writer(s) | Length |
|---|---|---|---|
| 1. | "The Jamestown Ferry" | Mack Vickery; Bobby Borchers | 2:53 |
| 2. | "Loving You Could Never Be Better" | Earl Montgomery; Carl Montgomery; Betty Tate | 2:37 |
| 3. | "Soul Song" | George Richey; Wilson; Billy Sherrill | 2:36 |
| 4. | "Love's the Answer" | Emily Mitchell; Wilson | 2:34 |
| 5. | "The Happiest Girl in the Whole USA" | Donna Fargo | 2:15 |
| 6. | "I'm So Lonesome I Could Cry" | Hank Williams | 2:50 |

== Personnel ==
Adapted from the album liner notes.

- Tanya Tucker – lead vocals
- Lou Bradley – engineer
- The Jordanaires – background vocals
- The Nashville Edition – background vocals
- Billy Sherrill – producer

== Charts ==
Album

| Chart (1972) | Peak chart positions |
|---|---|
| US Hot Country LP's (Billboard) | 32 |

Singles

| Title | Year | Peak chart positions | | |
| Title | Year | US Country | US | CAN Country |
|---|---|---|---|---|
| "Delta Dawn" | 1972 | 6 | 72 | 3 |
| "Love's the Answer" | 1972 | 5 | — | 1 |

Charted B-sides

| Title | Year | Peak chart positions | A-side |
| Title | Year | US Country | A-side |
|---|---|---|---|
| "The Jamestown Ferry" | 1972 | flip | "Love's the Answer" |

== Release history ==
| Region | Date | Format | Label | Ref. |
|---|---|---|---|---|
| Various | September 11, 1972 | LP; 8-track; cassette | Columbia | |
| UK | June 22, 2010 | CD | T-Bird | |
| Various | April 19, 2011 | Digital download | Sony; Legacy | |
