= Behind Closed Doors (Charlie Rich album) =

Studio album by Charlie Rich
- Released: May 1973
- Studios: Columbia (Nashville, Tennessee)
- Genre: Country
- Length: 31:30
- Label: Epic
- Producer: Billy Sherrill

Charlie Rich chronology
| Boss Man (1970) | Behind Closed Doors (1973) | Tomorrow Night (1973) |

Professional ratings
Review scores
| Source | Rating |
|---|---|
| Allmusic | 5/5 stars |
| Christgau's Record Guide | B− |
| Džuboks | favorable |

Behind Closed Doors is a 1973 album by Charlie Rich. The album received the Country Music Association award for Album of the Year; the title track (written by Kenny O'Dell) was also named CMA's Single of the Year, and Rich was named Best Male Vocalist for his performance on the album. Rich won the 1974 Grammy Award for Best Male Country Vocal Performance and also took home four Academy of Country Music awards for this album.

In 2002, the album was certified Quadruple Platinum by the RIAA, commemorating U.S. sales of over four million. Charlie Rich contributed "Peace On You" to this album. Charlie's wife Margaret Ann contributed two of her songs to the album as well, "A Sunday Kind of Woman" and "Nothing In The World (To Do With Me)". Charlie's teenage son contributed the song "You Never Really Wanted Me" to the album as well.

== Track listing ==
1. "Behind Closed Doors" (Kenny O'Dell) - 2:56
2. "If You Wouldn't Be My Lady" (Jimmy Holiday, Eddie Reeves) - 2:53
3. "You Never Really Wanted Me" (Allan Rich) - 2:27
4. "A Sunday Kind of Woman" (Margaret Ann Rich) - 3:09
5. "Peace On You" (Charlie Rich) - 3:59
6. "The Most Beautiful Girl" (Billy Sherrill, Norro Wilson, Rory Bourke) - 2:43
7. "I Take It On Home" (Kenny O'Dell) - 2:52
8. "'Til I Can't Take It Anymore" (Clyde Otis, Dorian Burton) - 2:30
9. "We Love Each Other" (Buddy Killen) - 3:08
10. "I'm Not Going Hungry Anymore" (Freddie Hart) - 2:12
11. "Nothing In the World (To Do With Me)" (Margaret Ann Rich) - 2:41

== Charts ==
=== Weekly charts ===
| Chart (1973–1974) | Peak position |
|---|---|
| Australia Albums (Kent Music Report) | 57 |
| US Billboard 200 | 8 |
| US Top Country Albums (Billboard) | 1 |

=== Year-end charts ===
| Chart (1973) | Position |
|---|---|
| US Top Country Albums (Billboard) | 1 |
| Chart (1974) | Position |
| US Billboard 200 | 8 |
| US Top Country Albums (Billboard) | 1 |

== Personnel ==
- Charlie Rich - vocals
- Billy Sanford, Dale Sellers, Harold Bradley, Jerry Kennedy, Ray Edenton - guitar
- Pete Drake, Lloyd Green - steel guitar
- Bob Moore - bass
- Hargus "Pig" Robbins - piano
- Buddy Harman, Kenny Buttrey - drums
- The Jordanaires, Nashville Edition - background vocals

Technical

- Charlie Bragg, Lou Bradley - engineers
- Bill Barnes, Peggy Owens - photography
