= What's Your Mama's Name =

Studio album by Tanya Tucker
- Released: May 21, 1973
- Recorded: January 5 – March 22, 1973
- Studios: Columbia (Nashville, Tennessee)
- Genre: Country
- Length: 29:11
- Label: Columbia
- Producer: Billy Sherrill

Tanya Tucker chronology
| Delta Dawn (1972) | What's Your Mama's Name (1973) | Would You Lay with Me (In a Field of Stone) (1974) |

Singles from What's Your Mama's Name
- 1. "What's Your Mama's Name" Released: March 5, 1973; 2. "Blood Red and Goin' Down" Released: August 13, 1973

What's Your Mama's Name is the second studio album by American country music singer Tanya Tucker. It was released on May 21, 1973, by Columbia Records. The album was produced by Billy Sherrill and includes Tucker's first two number one country singles, "What's Your Mama's Name" and "Blood Red and Goin' Down". It was certified Gold by the RIAA in 1995 for sales of more than 500,000 copies.

== Critical reception ==
Professional ratings
Review scores
| Source | Rating |
|---|---|
| AllMusic | 5/5 stars |

The review published in the June 2, 1973, issue of Cashbox said, "Blood Red and Goin' Down" opens this album's B-side on a powerful note. Hot mouth harp sizzles under Tanya's dramatic delivery and then the LP takes off, rockin' and sockin' through a list of tunes that draw on rock, blues, gospel and always—back to unmistakable country. Billy Sherrill production is the icing on this cake and, of course, the Jordanaires and the Nashville Edition add oomph. Hours and hours of listening pleasure here."

== Commercial performance ==
The album peaked at No. 4 on the US Billboard Hot Country LP's chart.

The album's first single, "What's Your Mama's Name", was released in March 1973 and peaked at No. 1 on the US Billboard Hot Country Singles chart and No. 86 on the US Billboard Hot 100. The single also peaked at No. 1 in Canada on the RPM Country Singles chart. The second single, "Blood Red and Goin' Down", was released in August 1973 and peaked at No. 1 on the US Billboard Hot Country Singles chart and No. 74 on the US Billboard Hot 100. It also peaked at No. 1 in Canada on the RPM Country Singles chart.

== Track listing ==
Side one
| No. | Title | Writer(s) | Length |
|---|---|---|---|
| 1. | "What's Your Mama's Name" | Dallas Frazier; Earl Montgomery | 2:55 |
| 2. | "Horseshoe Bend" | Bobby Borchers; Mack Vickery | 2:35 |
| 3. | "The Chokin' Kind" | Harlan Howard | 2:35 |
| 4. | "California Cotton Fields" | Frazier; Montgomery | 2:12 |
| 5. | "The Teddy Bear Song" | Nick Nixon; Don Earl | 3:00 |

Side two
| No. | Title | Writer(s) | Length |
|---|---|---|---|
| 1. | "Blood Red and Goin' Down" | Curly Putman | 3:00 |
| 2. | "Song Man" | Frazier; Arthur Leo Owens | 2:40 |
| 3. | "The Missing Piece of Puzzle" | Mark Sherrill; Leon Sherrill | 2:23 |
| 4. | "Rainy Girl" | Tanya Tucker; Codye Hancock | 2:29 |
| 5. | "Pass Me By (If You're Only Passing Through)" | Hillman Hall | 2:22 |
| 6. | "Teach Me the Words to Your Song" | Rory Bourke; Gayle Barnhill | 3:00 |

== Personnel ==
- Tanya Tucker – lead vocals
- Lou Bradley – engineer
- The Jordanaires – background vocals
- Bill McElhiney – string arrangements
- Cam Mullins – string arrangements
- The Nashville Edition – background vocals
- Billy Sherrill – producer

== Charts ==
Album

| Chart (1973) | Peak chart positions |
|---|---|
| US Hot Country LP's (Billboard) | 4 |

Singles

| Title | Year | Peak chart positions | | |
| Title | Year | US Country | US | CAN Country |
|---|---|---|---|---|
| "What's Your Mama's Name" | 1973 | 1 | 86 | 1 |
| "Blood Red and Goin' Down" | 1973 | 1 | 74 | 1 |

== Certifications ==
| Region | Certification | Certified units/sales |
|---|---|---|
| United States (RIAA) | Gold | 500,000^{^} |
^{^} Shipments figures based on certification alone.
