= The Jamestown Ferry =

Single by Tanya Tucker

from the album Delta Dawn
- A-side: "Love's the Answer"
- Released: October 1972
- Recorded: July 1972
- Studio: Columbia (Nashville, Tennessee)
- Genre: Country
- Length: 2:53
- Label: Columbia
- Songwriters: Bobby Borchers; Mack Vickery
- Producer: Billy Sherrill

Tanya Tucker singles chronology
"Delta Dawn" (1972)	"The Jamestown Ferry" (1972)	"What's Your Mama's Name" (1973)

"The Jamestown Ferry" is a song composed by Bobby Borchers and Mack Vickery. It was originally recorded and released as a single by American country artist, Tanya Tucker. The track was issued as a double A-side single in conjunction with "Love's the Answer" in October 1972. The singles both reached the top five of the American country chart and the top of the Canadian country chart. It was also included on Tucker's debut album called Delta Dawn.

Charley Crockett released his version of Jamestown Ferry on 2017’s Lil G.L.’s Honky Tonk Jubilee. Quickly becoming a crowd favorite at live shows it was followed up on 2023’s Live From the Ryman. A remixed version was released in 2025’s Lonesome Drifter.

Barbara Mandrell also recorded a version on her 1973 Columbia release The Midnight Oil.

== Background and recording ==
Tanya Tucker was 13 years old when she signed her first recording contract to Columbia Records. Her first single was 1972's "Delta Dawn", which became a top ten country song in North America. She would follow the song with a series of top ten (and later) number one country recordings. Her follow-up release would be "Love's the Answer". Included on the other side of "Love's the Answer" was a song called "The Jamestown Ferry". The tune was composed by Bobby Borchers and Mack Vickery. The track was recorded at the Columbia Studio in Nashville, Tennessee. The session was held in July 1972.

== Release and chart performance ==
"The Jamestown Ferry" was first included on Tucker's debut album in September 1972 titled Delta Dawn. In conjunction with "Love's the Answer", "The Jamestown Ferry" was issued as a double A-side single by Columbia Records in October 1972. Both singles were counted with the same chart positions. Spending 13 weeks on the American Billboard Hot Country Songs chart, "Love's the Answer"/"The Jamestown Ferry" peaked at number five by February 1973. On the Canadian RPM Country chart, the singles became her first to reach the number one spot.

== Track listing ==
7" double A-side vinyl single

- "Love's the Answer" – 2:34
- "The Jamestown Ferry" – 2:53

== Chart performance ==
Chart (1972–1973)	Peak position
Canada Country Singles (RPM)	1
US Hot Country Songs (Billboard)	5
