= Merle Haggard's Christmas Present =

- Cover to the standard edition of the album

Studio album by Merle Haggard
- Released: November 1973
- Recorded: January and July 1973
- Studio: Columbia (Nashville, Tennessee)
- Genre: Country, Christmas
- Length: 25:14
- Label: Capitol
- Producer: Ken Nelson, Fuzzy Owen

Merle Haggard chronology
I Love Dixie Blues (1973)	Merle Haggard's Christmas Present (1973)	If We Make It Through December (1974)

Singles from Merle Haggard's Christmas Present
- 1. "If We Make It Through December" Released: October 27, 1973

Alternative Cover

Professional ratings
Review scores
Source	Rating
Allmusic	4.5/5 stars

Merle Haggard's Christmas Present is the eighteenth studio album by American country singer Merle Haggard backed by The Strangers, released in 1973. The single, "If We Make It Through December" spent four weeks at No. 1 on the Billboard magazine Hot Country Singles chart in December 1973 and January 1974, and cracked the Top 30 of the Billboard Hot 100. "If We Make It Through December" was the No. 2 song of the year on Billboard's Hot Country Singles 1974 year-end chart.

The original LP release of the album carries the subtitle Something Old, Something New.

== Track listing ==
All songs by Merle Haggard unless otherwise noted.

1. "If We Make It Through December" – 2:42
2. "Santa Claus and Popcorn" – 2:13
3. "Bobby Wants a Puppy Dog for Christmas" – 2:13
4. "Daddy Won't Be Home Again for Christmas" – 3:04
5. "Grandma's Homemade Christmas Card" – 1:50
6. "White Christmas" (Irving Berlin) – 2:28
7. "Silver Bells" (Jay Livingston, Ray Evans) – 3:20
8. "Winter Wonderland" (Felix Bernard, Richard B. Smith) – 2:31
9. "Silent Night" (Josef Mohr, Franz Xaver Gruber) – 2:29
10. "Jingle Bells" (James Lord Pierpont) – 2:21

== Chart positions ==
Year	Chart	Position
1973	Billboard Hot Country Albums	4
