= Nick Nixon =

American country music singer-songwriter (1939–2013)

Hershel Paul "Nick" Nixon (March 20, 1939 – July 30, 2013) was an American country music singer and songwriter.

== Career ==
Nixon was born in Poplar Bluff, Missouri, and he later moved to St. Louis. He married Doris Ostendorf in 1959 and had four children. His son Paul later joined Nick's band as bass player and singer.

Nixon's best known song was The Teddy Bear Song, co-written with Don Earl, which country singer Barbara Fairchild took to number one on the Billboard Hot Country Singles chart in 1973. Two other songs written with Don Earl and producer Jerry Crutchfield - "Lovenworth" (Roy Rogers) and "Loser's Cocktail" (Dick Curless) - charted in 1971. As a singer, Nixon had a number of minor charting country songs in the 1970s, including "Rocking in Rosalee's Boat" (#28 country in 1976), "I'll Get Over You" (#34 country in 1978), and "I'm Too Use to Loving You" (#38 country in 1975). His only album, Nick Nixon, was released in 1977.

== Later life ==
Nixon's second wife's name was Kim; they had one child.

After leaving the national country music scene, Nixon entered the real estate business in the St. Louis area, but continued to perform locally. He owned and performed at several country bars and restaurants in the St. Louis area, including Choo Choo's Cafe in Foristell, Missouri.

Nixon died of pulmonary lung disease in St. Louis, Missouri, on July 30, 2013, at age 74. He is buried in Mount Zion Cemetery in O'Fallon, Missouri.
