= Love's the Answer =

Single by Tanya Tucker

from the album Delta Dawn
- A-side: "The Jamestown Ferry"
- Released: October 20, 1972
- Studio: Columbia (Nashville, Tennessee)
- Genre: Country
- Length: 2:34
- Label: Columbia
- Songwriter(s): Emily Mitchell; Norro Wilson
- Producer(s): Billy Sherrill

Tanya Tucker singles chronology
"Delta Dawn" (1972)	"Love's the Answer" (1972)	"What's Your Mama's Name" (1973)

"Love's the Answer" is a song written by Emily Mitchell and Norro Wilson, and recorded by American country music artist Tanya Tucker. It was released in October 1972 as the second single from her album Delta Dawn. The song peaked at number 5 on the Billboard Hot Country Singles chart. It also reached number 1 on the RPM Country Tracks chart in Canada.

== Chart performance ==
Chart (1972–1973)	Peak position
US Hot Country Songs (Billboard)	5
Canadian RPM Country Tracks	1
