= I Love Dixie Blues =

I Love Dixie Blues, So I Recorded Live In New Orleans

Live album by Merle Haggard and the Strangers
- Released: 1973
- Recorded: May 13, 1973 in New Orleans
- Genre: Country
- Length: 36:14
- Label: Capitol
- Producer: Ken Nelson, Fuzzy Owen

Merle Haggard and the Strangers chronology
It's Not Love (But It's Not Bad) (1972)	I Love Dixie Blues, So I Recorded Live In New Orleans (1973)	Merle Haggard's Christmas Present (1973)

Singles from I Love Dixie Blues
- 1. "I Wonder If They Ever Think of Me" Released: December 4, 1972; 2. "The Emptiest Arms in the World" Released: March 10, 1973; 3. "Everybody's Had the Blues" Released: June 30, 1973

I Love Dixie Blues (subtitled So I Recorded Live in New Orleans) is a live album by American country singer Merle Haggard and the Strangers, released in 1973.

== Background ==
Haggard had originally planned on releasing a studio-themed album called I Love Dixie Blues - test pressings and cover art had been prepared - but changed his mind, opting to rerecord some of the tracks live in New Orleans. The album was Haggard's third live LP in four years and features his usual backing band The Strangers augmented by a small horn trio named the Dixieland Express. The album is noteworthy for featuring several songs originally recorded by Emmet Miller, a minstrel show performer and recording artist from Georgia whose high falsetto and yodel-like voice had been a major influence on country stars like Jimmie Rodgers, Bob Wills, and Hank Williams, and it is likely that Williams became aware of "Lovesick Blues" from Miller's 1928 version.

The album produced three hit singles, the first being the #1 hit "I Wonder If They Ever Think of Me," which sees Haggard return to the subject of the Vietnam War, this time from the perspective of a POW. The other singles include the honky-tonk blues "The Emptiest Arms in the World," which peaked at number 3, and "Everybody's Had the Blues," another number one that also rose to #62 on the pop chart, his first appearance there since the single "Carolyn" in 1971.

== Reception ==
Professional ratings
Review scores
Source	Rating
AllMusic	3.5/5 stars
Christgau's Record Guide	C

I Love Dixie Blues... was released in July 1973 and topped the Billboard country albums chart. In his 2013 biography Merle Haggard: The Running Kind, David Cantwell wrote the album "is a thrilling document, loose and lively in a way Haggard had rarely been even at his finest. The addition of the Dixieland Horns gives the songs drives and character without sounding quaint..."

Stephen Thomas Erlewine of AllMusic wrote, "Haggard's gamble works quite well, since the brass section never feels like it's grafted onto the core band—they sound integrated, unlike his previous experiments with dixieland horns." Robert Christgau wrote, "The care Haggard put into his Jimmie Rodgers and Bob Wills tributes was palpable; this live-in-New Orleans-with-horns affair is slovenly."

== Track listing ==
1. "Hammin' It Up" (Norman Hamlet) – 2:00
2. "Everybody's Had the Blues" (Merle Haggard) – 3:35
3. "Big Bad Bill (Is Sweet William Now)" (Jack Yellen, Milton Ager) – 2:50
4. "I Forget You Every Day" (Haggard) – 2:52
5. "I Ain't Got Nobody" (Spencer Williams, Roger Graham, Dave Taylor) – 2:52
6. "Carolyn" (Tommy Collins) – 2:45
7. "Champagne" (Roy Nichols, Norman Hamlet, Biff Adams) – 1:47
8. "Lovesick Blues" (Irving Mills, Cliff Friend) – 2:37
9. "The Emptiest Arms in the World" (Haggard) – 3:19
10. "Nobody Knows I'm Hurtin'" (Haggard) – 1:50
11. "Intro to "Way Down Yonder in New Orleans" – 0:57
12. "Way Down Yonder In New Orleans" (Henry Creamer, J. Turner Layton) – 2:04
13. "Okie from Muskogee" (Haggard, Eddie Burris) – 3:00
14. "I Wonder If They Ever Think of Me" (Haggard) – 2:45
15. "Finale" – 1:01

== Personnel ==
- Merle Haggard – vocals, guitar

The Strangers:

- Roy Nichols – lead guitar
- Norman Hamlet – steel guitar, dobro
- Bobby Wayne – guitar
- Dennis Hromek – bass, background vocals
- Biff Adam – drums

with

- Mark Yeary – piano
- Johnny Gimble – fiddle
- Bonnie Owens – vocals

and

- The Dixie Land Express – horns

== Chart positions ==
Year	Chart	Position
1973	Billboard Country albums	1
1973	Billboard Pop albums	126
