= Here I Am Again =

Studio album by Loretta Lynn
- Released: October 2, 1972
- Recorded: January 18–August 9, 1972
- Studios: Bradley's Barn, Mount Juliet, Tennessee
- Genre: Country
- Length: 26:05
- Label: Decca
- Producer: Owen Bradley

Loretta Lynn chronology
God Bless America Again (1972)	Here I Am Again (1972)	Entertainer of the Year (1973)

Singles from Here I Am Again
- 1. "Here I Am Again" Released: June 12, 1972

Here I Am Again is the twenty-first solo studio album by American country music singer-songwriter Loretta Lynn. It was released on October 2, 1972, by Decca Records. The album features liner notes written by Lynn's mother, Clara Butcher, who had remarried following the death of Lynn's father, Ted Webb, in 1959. This would be Lynn's last studio album to be released under Decca Records, which would merge with MCA in 1973.

== Critical reception ==
Professional ratings
Review scores
Source	Rating
Allmusic	3/5 stars

In the October 21, 1972, issue, Billboard published a review of the album that said, "One of the decided queens of country music, Miss Loretta Lynn, offers "Manhattan Kansas", "Delta Dawn", and "The Best Years of My Life" as well as the title tune of Here I Am Again. A superb LP that warrants repeated airplay on country stations."

Cashbox published a review in the October 14, 1972, issue that said, "She's been here before, and she'll be back many times to follow. When Loretta says "here I am again" with a new eleven song collection, her return is welcome. She is one of the cornerstones of country music, and although her face is more than familiar to country aficionados, her music is always fresh and exciting – it never becomes repetitive or unreal. For this reason, Loretta has stayed on top of the scene and can say that she's here again with more new music. Includes "My Kind of Man", "Where Do Babies Go" and the title tune.

Allmusic rated the album three out of five stars, calling a couple of the songs on this album "sassy", including "A Woman a Day".

== Commercial performance ==
The album peaked at No. 4 on the US Billboard Hot Country LP's chart.

The album's only single, "Here I Am Again", peaked at No. 3 on the US Billboard Hot Country Singles chart. The single also peaked at No. 3 in Canada on the RPM Country Singles chart.

== Recording ==
Recording sessions for the album began on April 25 and 26, 1972, at Bradley's Barn studio in Mount Juliet, Tennessee. Two additional sessions followed on May 3 and August 9. Two songs on the album were recorded during the sessions for 1972's One's on the Way. "A Woman a Day" was recorded on January 18, 1972, and "I Miss You More Today" was recorded on January 20, 1972.

== Track listing ==
Side one
No.	Title	Writer(s)	Recording date	Length
1.	"Here I Am Again"	Shel Silverstein	April 26, 1972	2:44
2.	"My Kind of Man"	Darrell Statler	April 26, 1972	1:50
3.	"Manhattan, Kansas"	Joe Allen	August 9, 1972	2:25
4.	"Be Proud of Your Man"	L.E. White	April 25, 1972	2:19
5.	"There's a Built-In Trouble Maker in Every Man"	Elkin Rippy; Carmol Taylor; Norro Wilson	May 3, 1972	2:23
6.	"Love Takes a Long Time Dyin'"	Rick Craig; Bobby Hicks	April 26, 1972	2:31

Side one
No.	Title	Writer(s)	Recording date	Length
1.	"Delta Dawn"	Larry Collins; Alex Harvey	August 9, 1972	2:05
2.	"The Best Years of My Life"	Ray Griff	May 3, 1972	2:53
3.	"Where Do Babies Go?"	Lorene Allen; Kenny Starr	August 9, 1972	2:28
4.	"A Woman a Day"	Venda Holliday	January 18, 1972	2:05
5.	"I Miss You More Today"	Lorene Allen; Loretta Lynn	January 20, 1972	2:22

== Personnel ==
Adapted from the album liner notes and Decca recording session records.

- Willie Ackerman – drums
- Larry Barbier – photography
- Harold Bradley – bass guitar
- Owen Bradley – producer
- Clara Butcher – liner notes
- James Capps – acoustic guitar
- Ray Edenton – acoustic guitar
- Buddy Harman – drums
- The Jordanaires – background vocals
- Loretta Lynn – lead vocals
- Grady Martin – guitar
- Bob Moore – bass
- Hargus Robbins – piano
- Hal Rugg – steel guitar, dobro

== Charts ==
Album

Chart (1972)	Peak position
US Hot Country LP's (Billboard)	4

Singles

Title	Year	Peak position	
Title	Year	US Country	CAN Country
"Here I Am Again"	1972	3	3
