= The Nashville Sessions (Dean Martin album) =

Studio album by Dean Martin
- Released: June 15, 1983
- Recorded: January 17–21, 1983
- Studios: Masterfonics, Nashville
- Genre: Country
- Length: 28:30
- Label: Warner Bros. - WB-1-23870-1
- Producer: Jimmy Bowen

Dean Martin chronology
Once in a While (1978)	The Nashville Sessions (1983)

Professional ratings
Review scores
Source	Rating
Allmusic	4/5 stars

The Nashville Sessions is the thirty-fourth and final studio album by Italian-American singer and actor Dean Martin. It was released on June 15, 1983 and produced by Jimmy Bowen. This was Martin's last album.

== Overview ==
Martin sang two of the songs in duet, "My First Country Song" with Conway Twitty, and "Everybody's Had the Blues" with Merle Haggard.

These were Martin's last recording sessions, with the exception of his rare 1985 "L.A. Is My Home" single.

== Track listing ==
1. "Old Bones" (John Hadley)
2. "Everybody's Had the Blues" (Merle Haggard)
3. "Don't Give Up on Me" (Ben Peters)
4. "In Love Up to My Heart" (Chester Lester)
5. "Shoulder to Shoulder" (Dallas Frazier)
6. "Since I Met You Baby" (Ivory Joe Hunter)
7. "My First Country Song" (Conway Twitty)
8. "Drinking Champagne" (Bill Mack)
9. "Hangin' Around" (Chip Hardy, Rick & Janis Carnes)
10. "Love Put a Song in My Heart" (Ben Peters)

== Personnel ==
- Dean Martin - vocals
- Reggie Young, Billy Joe Walker Jr. - guitar
- Jimmy Capps - acoustic guitar
- John Hughey, Sonny Garrish - steel guitar
- David Hungate - bass
- David Briggs, Alan Moore - keyboards
- Buddy Spicher - fiddle
- Kieran Kane - mandolin
- James Stroud - drums
- Denis Solee, Sam Levine - horns
- Carol Chase, Dennis Wilson, Diane Tidwell, Donna Sheridan, Doug Clements, Gary Janney, Karen Taylor, Lisa Silver, Lori Brooks, Louis Nunley, Philip Forrest, Sherilyn Huffman, Terry Dearmore, Tom Brannon - backing vocals
- Nashville String Machine - strings
- Al De Lory - string arrangements
- Carl Gorodetzky - concertmaster
