= If We Make It Through December (album) =

Studio album by Merle Haggard and the Strangers
- Released: February 1974
- Recorded: April, November 1971, September 1972, January, July 1973
- Studio: Columbia (Nashville, Tennessee)
- Genre: Country
- Length: 30:13
- Label: Capitol
- Producer: Ken Nelson, Fuzzy Owen

Merle Haggard and the Strangers chronology
It's Not Love (But It's Not Bad) (1973)	If We Make It Through December (1974)	Merle Haggard Presents His 30th Album (1974)

Singles from If We Make It Through December
- 1. "If We Make It Through December" Released: October 27, 1973

If We Make It Through December is the sixteenth studio album by American country music singer Merle Haggard and the Strangers, released in 1974. It reached number 4 on the Billboard country album charts. The title track was previously released on Haggard's Christmas release of 1973, A Christmas Present. The single spent four weeks at No. 1 on the Billboard magazine Hot Country Singles chart in December 1973 and January 1974, and cracked the Top 30 of the Billboard Hot 100. "If We Make It Through December" was the No. 2 song of the year on Billboard's Hot Country Singles 1974 year-end chart.

== History ==
Haggard's 1973 Christmas single "If We Make It Through December" proved to be so popular that it became the title track for this February 1974 release. The song explores the feelings of an unemployed father struggling to make ends meet and provide a happy Christmas for his daughter. As Daniel Cooper observes in the liner notes to the 1994 Haggard box set Down Every Road, "That it's one of the most heartbreaking Christmas songs ever recorded didn't matter to people who prefer honestly rendered pain to false merriment." In his book Merle Haggard: The Running Kind, David Cantwell notes that "If We Make It Through December" is a Christmas song, but "it feels like an anti-Christmas song. The character he plays isn't just feeling blue this holiday season like we've seen in hundreds of other Christmas numbers. He hates Christmas, hates the whole idea of it, at least this year." The song reached number one on the country singles chart and crossed over to number 28 on the pop charts, becoming Haggard's biggest hit.

Although Haggard had been writing the majority of the songs on his LPs for years, outside contributions dominate this album. As he later recalled in his 1981 autobiography Sing Me Back Home, Haggard and wife Bonnie Owens were splitting up at the time.

== Critical reception ==
Professional ratings
Review scores
Source	Rating
AllMusic	3.5/5 stars
Christgau's Record Guide	B

‘‘If We Make It Through December’’ was generally well received by critics. In a review published in the Houston Post’’, Bob Claypool wrote that Merle Haggard “has done it again,” adding that the album was “one of the finest country LPs to appear so far this year.”

Contemporary reviews have also been positive. Stephen Thomas Erlewine of AllMusic writes, "Usually, Merle Haggard's musical eclecticism is a virtue, but on If We Make It Through December it hurts the overall impact of the album. Many of the individual tracks—particularly the gentle, yearning title track and good versions of Lefty Frizzell's 'I'm An Old, Old Man (Tryin' To Live While I Can)' and the country standard 'To Each His Own'—work well on their own, but often the straight-up country, western swing, Dixieland experiments and pop-tinged ballads seem at odds with each other." Robert Christgau wrote, "Last time it was good to hear him go contemporary again. This time one of the two contemporary standouts sounds mysteriously like Bob Wills. The Lefty Frizzell and Floyd Tillman remakes come across fresh and clean. The Ink Spots remake doesn't."

== Track listing ==
No.	Title	Writer(s)	Length
1.	"If We Make It Through December"	Merle Haggard	2:42
2.	"Love and Honor Never Crossed Your Mind"	Haggard	2:48
3.	"To Each His Own"	Jay Livingston, Ray Evans	2:35
4.	"You're the Only Girl in the Game"	Hank Cochran, Glenn Martin	2:55
5.	"I'm an Old Old Man (Tryin' to Live While I Can)"	Lefty Frizzell	2:34
6.	"Come on into My Arms"	Marcia Nichols	2:48
7.	"Better Off When I Was Hungry"	Dave Kirby	2:24
8.	"I'll Break Out Again Tonight"	Arthur Leo Owens, Sanger D. Shafer	2:50
9.	"This Cold War With You"	Floyd Tillman	2:54
10.	"Uncle Lem"	Glenn Martin	2:54
11.	"There's Just One Way"	Haggard, Kenny Seratt	2:49

== Personnel ==
- Merle Haggard – vocals, guitar

The Strangers:

- Roy Nichols – lead guitar
- Norman Hamlet – steel guitar, Dobro
- Bobby Wayne – guitar
- Marcia Nichols – guitar
- Dennis Hromek – bass, background vocals
- Biff Adam – drums

with

- Tommy Collins – guitar
- Dave Kirby – guitar
- Ronnie Reno – guitar
- Mark Yeary – piano
- Johnny Meeks – bass
- Johnny Gimble – fiddle

and

- Hargus "Pig" Robbins – piano, organ
- Billy Liebert – piano
- Joe Zinkan – bass
- Bill Woods – fiddle
- Bill Puett – horns

== Charts ==
=== Weekly charts ===
Chart (1974–1975)	Peak position
Australia Albums (Kent Music Report)	92
US Billboard 200	190
US Top Country Albums (Billboard)	4

=== Year-end charts ===
Chart (1974)	Position
US Top Country Albums (Billboard)	34
