= Here I Am Again (song) =

Single by Loretta Lynn

from the album Here I Am Again
- B-side: "My Kind of Man"
- Released: June 1972
- Recorded: April 26, 1972
- Studio: Bradley's Barn, Mount Juliet, Tennessee
- Genre: Country
- Length: 2:44
- Label: Decca
- Songwriter(s): Shel Silverstein
- Producer(s): Owen Bradley

Loretta Lynn singles chronology
"One's on the Way" (1971)	"Here I Am Again" (1972)	"Rated "X"" (1972)

"Here I Am Again" is a song written by Shel Silverstein that was originally performed by American country music artist Loretta Lynn. It was released as a single in June 1972 via Decca Records.

== Background and reception ==
"Here I Am Again" was recorded at Bradley's Barn studio in Mount Juliet, Tennessee on April 26, 1972. The session was produced by the studio's owner, renowned country music producer Owen Bradley. Two additional tracks were recorded during this session.

"Here I Am Again" reached number three on the Billboard Hot Country Singles survey in 1972. Additionally, the song peaked at number three on the Canadian RPM Country Songs chart during this same period. It was included on her studio album, Here I Am Again (1972).

== Track listings ==
7" vinyl single

- "Here I Am Again" – 2:44
- "My Kind of Man" – 1:50

== Charts ==
Chart (1972)	Peak position
Canada Country Songs (RPM)	3
US Hot Country Singles (Billboard)	3
