= Entertainer of the Year =

Studio album by Loretta Lynn
- Released: February 26, 1973
- Recorded: August 19, 1970–December 12, 1972
- Studios: Bradley's Barn, Mount Juliet, Tennessee
- Genre: Country
- Length: 28:19
- Label: MCA
- Producer: Owen Bradley

Loretta Lynn chronology
Here I Am Again (1972)	Entertainer of the Year (1973)	Louisiana Woman, Mississippi Man (1973)

Singles from Entertainer of the Year
- 1. "Rated "X"" Released: November 20, 1972

Entertainer of the Year is the twenty-second solo studio album by American country music singer-songwriter Loretta Lynn. It was released on February 26, 1973, by MCA Records. This was Lynn's first album with MCA following Decca's consolidation into the MCA label.

This album was titled Entertainer of the Year after Lynn received the Entertainer of the Year award from the Country Music Association the previous year, becoming the first woman to win that award.

== Critical reception ==
In the March 10, 1973 issue, Billboard published a review that said, "One of the more remarkable things about this album is its ability to demonstrate Miss Lynn as a blues singer. On a few of the cuts, her blues are superb. There are more sides of Loretta here than we're used to, and they're good." The review also noted "Hanky Panky Woman", "I'm All He's Got", and "Possessions" as the best cuts on the album.

Cashbox published a review in the March 17 issue which said, "Although Loretta's latest is titled after her recent country music award, it would not be overstating matters to claim that she is the entertainer of any year. This album continues her already established fine tradition of recording the best country material available and delivering it with the style and grace that only she can. Included are her current hit, "Rated "X"", "Legend in My Mind", "Hanky Panky Woman", and "Possessions". A sure fire winner in, and for, the Entertainer of the Year."

== Commercial performance ==
Professional ratings
Review scores
Source	Rating
AllMusic	2.5/5 stars

The album peaked at No. 1 on the US Billboard Hot Country LP's chart.

The album's only single, "Rated "X"", was released in November 1972 and peaked atop the US Billboard Hot Country Singles chart. The single also peaked at No. 1 in Canada on the RPM Country Singles chart.

== Recording ==
Recording sessions for the album took place on August 21 and December 12, 1972, at Bradley's Barn in Mount Juliet, TN. Three songs on the album were recorded during previous sessions. "Hanky Panky Woman" was recorded during the August 19, 1970 session for 1970's Coal Miner's Daughter. "Rated "X"" is the only song ever released of the three songs recorded during the session on August 24, 1971. "Legend in My Mind" was recorded on April 25, 1972, during a session for 1972's Here I Am Again.

== Track listing ==
Side one
No.	Title	Writer(s)	Recording date	Length
1.	"Rated "X""	Loretta Lynn	August 24, 1971	2:35
2.	"Till the Pain Outwears the Shame"	Wiley J. Smith	August 21, 1972	2:40
3.	"Ruby, Madge and Mable"	Dallas Frazier; A. L. Owens	August 21, 1972	2:37
4.	"Legend in My Mind"	Paul Richey; Theresa Beaty	April 25, 1972	2:52
5.	"Ain't It Funny"	Tracey Lee	December 12, 1972	2:43
6.	"Yesterday Will Come Again Tonight"	Glenn Ray; Jermiah Stone	December 12, 1972	2:45

Side two
No.	Title	Writer(s)	Recording date	Length
1.	"Hanky Panky Woman"	Jim Owen; Lois Johnson	August 19, 1970	2:46
2.	"I'm All He's Got (But He's Got All of Me)"	Wiley J. Smith	December 12, 1972	2:27
3.	"I'm Paying for My Raising"	Doris Hutchins; Harold J. Norrid	August 21, 1972	2:00
4.	"Possessions"	Martha Baker; S. Burnett	December 12, 1972	2:29
5.	"I Need Someone to Hold Me (When I Cry)"	Raymond A. Smith	December 12, 1972	2:23

== Personnel ==
Adapted from the album liner notes and MCA recording session records.

- Harold Bradley – bass guitar
- Owen Bradley – producer
- Ray Edenton – acoustic guitar
- Buddy Harman – drums
- Darrell Johnson - mastering
- The Jordanaires – background vocals
- Loretta Lynn – lead vocals
- Grady Martin – guitar
- Charlie McCoy – harmonica, vibes
- Bob Moore – bass
- Doctor Elkin L. Rippy – liner notes
- Hargus Robbins – piano
- Hal Rugg – steel, dobro
- Jerry Shook – guitar
- Jerry Smith – piano
- Pete Wade – guitar

== Charts ==
Album

Chart (1973)	Peak position
US Hot Country LP's (Billboard)	1

Singles

Title	Year	Peak position	
Title	Year	US Country	CAN Country
"Rated "X""	1972	1	1
