= The Emptiest Arms in the World =

Single by Merle Haggard and The Strangers

from the album I Love Dixie Blues
- B-side: "Radiator Man from Wasco"
- Released: March 10, 1973
- Genre: Country
- Length: 3:19
- Label: Capitol
- Songwriter(s): Merle Haggard
- Producer(s): Ken Nelson; Fuzzy Owen

Merle Haggard and The Strangers singles chronology
"I Wonder If They Ever Think of Me" (1972)	"The Emptiest Arms in the World" (1973)	"Everybody's Had the Blues" (1973)

"The Emptiest Arms in the World" is a song written and recorded by American country music artist Merle Haggard and The Strangers. It was released in March 1973 as the second single from the album I Love Dixie Blues. The song peaked at number three on the U.S. Billboard Hot Country Singles chart. It reached number twelve on the Canadian RPM Country Tracks.

== Personnel ==
- Merle Haggard– vocals, guitar

The Strangers:

- Roy Nichols – lead guitar
- Norman Hamlet – steel guitar, dobro
- Bobby Wayne – guitar
- Dennis Hromek – bass, background vocals
- Biff Adam – drums

== Chart performance ==
Chart (1973)	Peak position
US Hot Country Songs (Billboard)	3
Canadian RPM Country Tracks	12
