= If We Make It Through December =

Single by Merle Haggard and the Strangers

from the album If We Make It Through December
- B-side: "Bobby Wants a Puppy Dog for Christmas"
- Released: October 27, 1973
- Recorded: 1973
- Studio: Columbia (Nashville, Tennessee)
- Genre: Country
- Length: 2:42
- Label: Capitol 3746
- Songwriter(s): Merle Haggard
- Producer(s): Ken Nelson

Merle Haggard and the Strangers singles chronology
"Everybody's Had the Blues" (1973)	"If We Make It Through December" (1973)	"Things Aren't Funny Anymore" (1974)

"If We Make It Through December" is a song written and recorded by American country music singer Merle Haggard and the Strangers. It was released in October 1973 as the lead single from the album Merle Haggard's Christmas Present, and was the title track on a non-Christmas album four months later. In the years since its release, "If We Make It Through December" — which, in addition to its Christmas motif, also uses themes of unemployment and loneliness — has become one of the trademark songs of Haggard's career.

== Content ==
Written in 1973, it treats with Haggard's characteristically simple poetry the desperate optimism of a working-class man dealing with economic hardship. Having been laid off from his factory job just prior to the Christmas season, the man becomes depressed over his predicament during what normally should be a "happy time of year." At one point, he observes that his little girl "don't understand why Daddy can't afford no Christmas gift."

The chorus, "If we make it through December/Everything's gonna be alright, I know" expresses hope, the protagonist telling himself that hope exists if he wants to deal with "the coldest time of winter" and the cold, lonely feeling he experiences while watching the snow fall ("and I shiver when I see the falling snow").

While Christmas is a prominent theme of this song, writer Merle Haggard said the song is not considered a "pure" Christmas record, as the subject of economics was also explored.

== Critical reception ==
"If We Make It Through December" was received positively by a review panel with Billboard magazine. In the review published October 13, 1973, they wrote, "Another change of pace by Haggard, who keeps surprising with his various styles, and does so well with all. He is a complete artist."

In 2024, Rolling Stone ranked the song at #107 on its 200 Greatest Country Songs of All Time ranking.

== Chart performance ==
The song spent four weeks at No. 1 on the Billboard Hot Country Singles chart in December 1973 and January 1974, and cracked the Top 30 of the Billboard Hot 100. "If We Make It Through December" was the No. 2 song of the year on Billboard's Hot Country Singles 1974 year-end chart.

Chart (1973–1974)	Peak position
US Hot Country Songs (Billboard)	1
US Billboard Easy Listening	16
US Billboard Hot 100	28
Canadian RPM Country Tracks	1
Canadian RPM Top Singles	30
Canadian RPM Adult Contemporary Tracks	37

== Cover versions ==
Several singers in the country, folk and pop genres have covered "If We Make It Through December," including Alan Jackson (on his Christmas album, Honky Tonk Christmas), Marty Robbins, Faron Young, Holly Cole. Joey + Rory recorded it for their album A Farmhouse Christmas with Merle Haggard adding background vocals as well as singing the final chorus. The song was also covered by the Blue Shadows, featuring Billy Cowsill, and included on the 2010 re-release of the band's debut album. The song was covered by both The Mamas and Phoebe Bridgers in November 2020. Scottish folk singer Iona Fyfe covered it in Scots in 2024.
