= She Needs Someone to Hold Her (When She Cries) =

Single by Conway Twitty

from the album She Needs Someone to Hold Her
- B-side: "This Road That I Walk"
- Released: November 1972
- Recorded: September 27, 1972
- Studio: Bradley's Barn, Mount Juliet, Tennessee
- Genre: Country
- Length: 2:47
- Label: Decca
- Songwriter(s): Raymond Smith
- Producer(s): Owen Bradley

Conway Twitty singles chronology
"I Can't Stop Loving You" (1972)	"She Needs Someone to Hold Her (When She Cries)" (1972)	"Baby's Gone" (1973)

"She Needs Someone to Hold Her (When She Cries)" is a song written by Raymond Smith, and recorded by American country music artist Conway Twitty. It was released in November 1972 as the first single from the album She Needs Someone to Hold Her. The song was Twitty's ninth number one in the U.S. country chart as a solo artist. It stayed at number one for two weeks and spent 14 weeks in the chart.

== Personnel ==
- Conway Twitty — vocals
- Joe E. Lewis, The Nashville Sounds — vocals
- Harold Bradley — 6-string electric bass guitar
- Ray Edenton — acoustic guitar
- John Hughey — steel guitar
- Tommy Markham — drums
- Grady Martin — electric guitar
- Bob Moore — bass
- Hargus "Pig" Robbins — piano

== Chart performance ==
Chart (1972–1973)	Peak position
US Hot Country Songs (Billboard)	1
Canadian RPM Country Tracks	8
