= Blood Red and Goin' Down =

- German promotional sleeve

Single by Tanya Tucker

from the album What's Your Mama's Name
- B-side: "The Missing Piece of Puzzle"
- Released: June 29, 1973
- Studio: Columbia (Nashville, Tennessee)
- Genre: Country
- Length: 3:02
- Label: Columbia
- Songwriter(s): Curly Putman
- Producer(s): Billy Sherrill

Tanya Tucker singles chronology
"What's Your Mama's Name" (1973)	"Blood Red and Goin' Down" (1973)	"Would You Lay with Me (In a Field of Stone)" (1973)

"Blood Red and Goin' Down" is a song written by Curly Putman, and recorded by American country music artist Tanya Tucker. It was released in June 1973 as the second single from Tucker's album What's Your Mama's Name. The single was Tucker's second number one on the country chart and would stay at number one for a single week and spend a total of twelve weeks on the chart.

== Content ==
The song is about an adolescent girl, who accompanies her father to a barroom where her mother and her mother's lover are drinking, and witnesses as her father murders the pair.

== Chart performance ==
Chart (1973)	Peak position
US Hot Country Songs (Billboard)	1
US Billboard Hot 100	74
Canadian RPM Country Tracks	1
