= What's Your Mama's Name (song) =

- German release picture sleeve

Single by Tanya Tucker

from the album What's Your Mama's Name
- B-side: "Rainy Girl"
- Released: February 16, 1973
- Recorded: January 5, 1973
- Studio: Columbia (Nashville, Tennessee)
- Genre: Country
- Length: 3:03
- Label: Columbia
- Songwriters: Dallas Frazier and Earl Montgomery
- Producer: Billy Sherrill

Tanya Tucker singles chronology
"Love's the Answer/The Jamestown Ferry" (1972)	"What's Your Mama's Name" (1973)	"Blood Red and Goin' Down" (1973)

"What's Your Mama's Name" is a song written by Dallas Frazier and Earl Montgomery, and recorded by American country music artist Tanya Tucker. It was released in February 1973 as the first single and title track from the album What's Your Mama's Name. The song was Tucker's fourth hit on the country chart and her first number one. The single stayed at number one for a single week and spent a total of fourteen weeks on the chart. On the Billboard Hot 100 pop chart, it reached number eighty-six. Tammy Wynette also recorded an unreleased version of the song in the early 1970s. Her version was never officially released till after her death in 1998.

== Content ==
The song tells, in flashback, of a man named Buford Wilson. The story begins at least 30 years beforehand, when the young man travels to Memphis, Tennessee, in search of a woman with whom he'd had a previous relationship in New Orleans. He spends the next decade asking people about the woman's whereabouts, and is generally ignored-now described not as a "young man," but as "a drunkard," he has an encounter with a young, green-eyed girl. As told in the song's refrain:

What's your mama's name, child? What's your mama's name? Does she ever talk about a place called New Orleans? Has she ever mentioned a man named Buford Wilson?

Wilson is arrested for enticing a child - after he had offered her a nickel's worth of candy if she revealed the identity of her mother - and is jailed for a month of labor. The final verse describes how, about a year before the present, Wilson, now a "wayward soul" that the county had to claim, is found dead in Memphis, wearing a ragged coat. Inside the coat's pocket is a "faded letter" stating, "You have a daughter, and her eyes are Wilson green," showing that Wilson's intent was not predatory, but to simply find his lost daughter and to reconnect with her mother, his lost love.

== Chart performance ==
Chart (1973)	Peak position
US Hot Country Songs (Billboard)	1
US Billboard Hot 100	86
Canadian RPM Country Tracks	1
