= You've Never Been This Far Before =

Single by Conway Twitty

from the album You've Never Been This Far Before
- B-side: "You Make It Hard (To Take the Easy Way Out)"
- Released: July 2, 1973
- Recorded: April 4, 1973
- Studio: Bradley's Barn, Mount Juliet, Tennessee
- Genre: Country
- Length: 3:02
- Label: MCA
- Songwriter(s): Conway Twitty
- Producer(s): Owen Bradley

Conway Twitty singles chronology
"Baby's Gone" (1973)	"You've Never Been This Far Before" (1973)	"There's a Honky Tonk Angel (Who'll Take Me Back In)" (1974)

"You've Never Been This Far Before" is a song written and recorded by American country music artist Conway Twitty. It was released in July 1973 as the second single and title track from the album You've Never Been This Far Before.

== Content ==
The song was controversial at the time of its release, with several radio stations banning it, due to what were considered by some to be overly sexual lyrics.

== Personnel ==
- Conway Twitty — vocals
- Joe E. Lewis, The Nashville Sounds — vocals
- Harold Bradley — 6-string electric bass guitar
- Ray Edenton — acoustic guitar
- Johnny Gimble — fiddle
- John Hughey — steel guitar, dobro
- Tommy Markham — drums
- Grady Martin — electric guitar
- Bob Moore — bass
- Hargus "Pig" Robbins — piano

== Chart performance ==
The song was Twitty's 10th number one on the country chart as a solo artist. The single stayed at number one for three weeks and spent a total of 16 weeks on the chart.

"You've Never Been This Far Before" was Twitty's only song from the country chart to cross over onto the Top 40 of the Billboard Hot 100, where the single peaked at number 22.

=== Conway Twitty ===
Chart (1973–1974)	Peak position
Australia (Kent Music Report)	12
US Hot Country Songs (Billboard)	1
US Billboard Hot 100	22
US Adult Contemporary (Billboard)	37
Canadian RPM Country Tracks	1
Canadian RPM Top Singles	30
Canadian RPM Adult Contemporary Tracks	21

=== Carroll Baker ===
Canadian singer Carroll Baker released a version titled "I've Never Been This Far Before". This version of the song reached number one on the RPM Country Tracks chart in Canada in May 1975.

Chart (1975)	Peak position
Canadian RPM Country Tracks	1
