= The Most Beautiful Girl =

Single by Charlie Rich

from the album Behind Closed Doors
- B-side: "I Feel Like Going Home"
- Released: 29 August 1973
- Recorded: 1973
- Studio: Columbia (Nashville, Tennessee)
- Genre: Country; country pop; countrypolitan; blue-eyed soul
- Length: 2:43
- Label: Epic
- Songwriters: Rory Bourke; Billy Sherrill; Norro Wilson
- Producer: Billy Sherrill

Charlie Rich singles chronology
"Behind Closed Doors" (1973)	"The Most Beautiful Girl" (1973)	"A Very Special Love Song" (1974)

Official audio
- "The Most Beautiful Girl" on YouTube

"The Most Beautiful Girl" is a song recorded by Charlie Rich and written by Billy Sherrill, Norro Wilson, and Rory Bourke. The countrypolitan ballad reached No. 1 in the United States in 1973 on three Billboard music charts: the pop chart (two weeks), the country chart (three weeks), and the adult contemporary chart (three weeks), as well as in Canada on three RPM charts: the RPM 100 Top Singles chart, the Country Tracks chart, and the Adult Contemporary chart. Billboard ranked it as the No. 23 song for 1974.

It is actually a merging of two songs previously recorded by Wilson: "Hey Mister" (from 1968). which forms a major part of the song; and "Mama McCluskie”, used in part in the chorus.

The B-side, Rich's own "I Feel Like Going Home”, was later covered by Rita Coolidge and was released on her 1974 album Fall into Spring. British pop singer Engelbert Humperdinck covered "The Most Beautiful Girl" on his 1973 album Engelbert: King of Hearts.

"The Most Beautiful Girl" was also recorded by Slim Whitman and released on his 1974 album Happy Anniversary, and the same year by Andy Williams on his album The Way We Were. In 1975 ABBA singer Anni-Frid Lyngstad recorded a Swedish-language version called "Vill du låna en man?" (with Swedish lyrics by Stig Anderson) on her solo album Frida ensam. Sergio Franchi recorded the song on his 1976 DynaHouse album 20 Magnificent Songs. Country music boy band South 65 recorded an updated version of the song, titled "The Most Beautiful Girl (2001 Version)”. on their 2001 album Dream Large.

The song receives a very brief airing by Brenda Fricker in the film So I Married an Axe Murderer. Jason Alexander offered a rendition as his character George Costanza on the December 16, 1992, episode of the sitcom Seinfeld titled "The Pick", where he bemoaned the loss of his girlfriend, Susan. The song is featured prominently in the 2018 horror film The Ranger.

== Personnel ==
- Charlie Rich – vocals
- Billy Sanford, Dale Sellers, Harold Bradley, Jerry Kennedy, Ray Edenton – guitar
- Pete Drake, Lloyd Green – steel guitar
- Bob Moore – bass
- Hargus "Pig" Robbins – piano
- Buddy Harman, Kenny Buttrey – drums
- The Jordanaires, Nashville Edition – background vocals

== Charts ==
=== Weekly charts ===
Chart (1973–1974)	Peak position
Australia (Kent Music Report)	7
Belgian VRT Top 30	1
Canadian RPM Country Tracks	1
Canadian RPM Top Singles	1
Canadian RPM Adult Contemporary	1
Danish Singles Chart	5
French Singles Chart	10
German Singles Chart	14
Irish Singles Chart	2
Netherlands	3
Norwegian Singles Chart	8
UK Singles Chart	2
US Billboard Hot 100	1
US Billboard Hot Country Singles	1
US Billboard Easy Listening	1
US Cash Box Top 100	1

=== Year-end charts ===
Chart (1973)	Rank
Canada	84

Chart (1974)	Rank
Australia (Kent Music Report)	57
UK	25
US Billboard Hot 100	23
US Cash Box Top 100	3

== Certifications ==
Region	Certification	Certified units/sales
United States (RIAA)	Gold	1,000,000^{^}
^{^} Shipments figures based on certification alone.
