= Behind Closed Doors (Charlie Rich song) =

Single by Charlie Rich

from the album Behind Closed Doors
- B-side: "A Sunday Kind of Woman"
- Released: 17 January 1973
- Recorded: 1972
- Studio: Columbia (Nashville, Tennessee)
- Genre: Country pop; soft rock
- Length: 2:56
- Label: Epic
- Songwriter: Kenny O'Dell
- Producer: Billy Sherrill

Charlie Rich singles chronology
"I Take It on Home" (1972)	"Behind Closed Doors" (1973)	"The Most Beautiful Girl" (1973)

Official audio
- "Behind Closed Doors" on YouTube

"Behind Closed Doors" is a country song written by Kenny O'Dell. It was first recorded by Charlie Rich for his 1973 album Behind Closed Doors. The single was Rich's first No.1 hit on the country charts, spent 20 weeks on this chart, and was also a crossover hit on the pop charts. It was certified Platinum by the RIAA for U.S. sales in excess of two million copies. Background vocals were provided by The Nashville Edition.

Rich's producer, Billy Sherrill, encouraged O'Dell to write music for the singer. O'Dell recalled the creation of "Behind Closed Doors" to Tom Roland in The Billboard Book of Number One Country Hits. "It was just a title I had written down, and I had a little guitar riff that I'd carried with me for a couple of years. The chorus was pretty much a little deviation on that." Sherrill later changed some lines at the end of the second verse, but some radio stations banned the record initially as being racy.

"Behind Closed Doors" earned awards for Song of the Year for O'Dell and Single of the Year for Rich from both the Country Music Association and the Academy of Country Music. Both O'Dell and Rich also received a Grammy Awards for "Behind Closed Doors: Best Country Song for O'Dell and Best Country Vocal Performance, Male for Rich. In 2003, it ranked No.9 in CMT's 100 Greatest Songs in Country Music.

The pianist was Hargus "Pig" Robbins.

== Chart performance ==
Charlie Rich

Chart (1973–74)	Peak position
US Hot Country Songs (Billboard)	1
US Billboard Hot 100	15
US Adult Contemporary (Billboard)	8
US Cash Box Top 100	17
Australia (Kent Music Report)	18
Canadian RPM Country Tracks	1
Canadian RPM Top Singles	5
Canadian RPM Adult Contemporary Tracks	37
Irish Singles Chart	9
UK Singles Chart	16
Dutch Top 40	25

Diana Ross

Chart (1974)	Peak position
South Africa (Springbok)	14

== Personnel ==
- Charlie Rich – vocals
- Billy Sanford, Dale Sellers, Harold Bradley, Jerry Kennedy, Ray Edenton – guitar
- Pete Drake, Lloyd Green – steel guitar
- Bob Moore – bass
- Hargus "Pig" Robbins – piano
- Buddy Harman, Kenny Buttrey – drums
- The Jordanaires, Nashville Edition – background vocals

== Cover versions ==
Numerous other artists have covered the song "Behind Closed Doors", using the original or slightly modified lyrics. For example, Loretta Lynn and Dolly Parton sang versions in which the genders were reversed and a few words changed or added, while Diana Ross sang a version with both gender change and added lines. Ross's version reached No.14 in South Africa.

Other artists who covered this song include Bettye LaVette, Ronnie Milsap, Hank Thompson, Cal Smith, Perry Como, Percy Sledge, Little Milton, Mike Cooley, Stan Ridgway, Tom Jones, Bobby Womack, and Buddy Jewell.

Joe Diffie covered the song on the 1998 album Tribute to Tradition. His version peaked at No.64 on the Billboard Hot Country Singles & Tracks chart.

Brett Kissel covered the song on his 2023 release The Compass Project - West Album.
