= (Old Dogs, Children and) Watermelon Wine =

Single by Tom T. Hall

from the album The Storyteller
- B-side: "Grandma Whistled"
- Released: November 13, 1972
- Recorded: July 12, 1972; Mercury Custom Recording Studio; Nashville, Tennessee
- Genre: Country
- Length: 4:09
- Label: Mercury
- Songwriter: Tom T. Hall
- Producer: Jerry Kennedy

Tom T. Hall singles chronology
"More About John Henry" (1972)	"(Old Dogs, Children and) Watermelon Wine" (1972)	"Hello, We're Lonely" (1972)

"(Old Dogs, Children and) Watermelon Wine" is a song written and recorded by American country music artist Tom T. Hall. It was released in November 1972 as the second and final single from the album The Storyteller. The song was Hall's third number one on the U.S. country singles chart and earned him his second nomination for the Grammy Award for Best Country Song. "(Old Dogs, Children and) Watermelon Wine" spent one week at the top and a total of thirteen weeks on the chart. On June 1, 2014, Rolling Stone magazine ranked the song #93 on its list of the 100 greatest country songs.

== Content ==
The song is a true account of Hall's experience at the 1972 Democratic National Convention, where he had a conversation with an old porter (janitor) at a Miami Beach hotel. The porter appraises his own life by concluding that the only worthwhile things are the three listed in the song's title.

== Covers ==
The song was covered by artists such as Frankie Laine, whose version changed what the bartender was watching from Ironside to Rawhide; George Burns; John Prine; and Mac Wiseman and Ferlin Husky. Alf Robertson wrote new lyrics and recorded the song in 1977 in Swedish as Hundar och ungar och hembryggt äppelvin (Swedish for Dogs and children and home-brewed apple wine); he scored a Svensktoppen hit with the song for 10 weeks between 2 November 1980 and 18 January 1981, topping the chart for 4 weeks.

== Chart performance ==
Chart (1972–73)	Peak position
US Hot Country Songs (Billboard)	1
Canadian RPM Country Playlist	1
Australian (Go-Set)	21
New Zealand (Listener)	17
