= Come Live with Me (Roy Clark song) =

Single by Roy Clark

from the album Come Live with Me
- B-side: "Darby's Castle"
- Released: February 1973
- Genre: Country
- Label: Dot
- Songwriter(s): Felice and Boudleaux Bryant
- Producer(s): Jim Foglesong

Roy Clark singles chronology
| "The Lawrence Welk - Hee Haw Counter-Revolution Polka" (1972) | "Come Live with Me" (1973) | "Riders in the Sky" (1973) |

"Come Live with Me' is a 1973 single written by Felice and Boudleaux Bryant and recorded by Roy Clark. "Come Live with Me" was Roy Clark's twelfth hit on the country chart and his only number one. The single stayed at number one for a single week and spent a total of sixteen weeks on the country chart, also crossing over to the top 40 of the easy listening chart and reaching the lower reaches of the Hot 100, peaking at 89 on that chart.

== Chart performance ==
| Chart (1973) | Peak position |
|---|---|
| U.S. Billboard Hot Country Singles | 1 |
| U.S. Billboard Hot 100 | 89 |
| U.S. Billboard Adult Contemporary | 23 |
| Canadian RPM Country Tracks | 1 |
| Canadian RPM Adult Contemporary Tracks | 70 |
