= Rated "X" (song) =

Single by Loretta Lynn

from the album Entertainer of the Year
- B-side: "Till the Pain Outwears the Shame"
- Released: November 20, 1972
- Recorded: August 24, 1971
- Genre: Country
- Length: 2:35
- Label: Decca
- Songwriter(s): Loretta Lynn
- Producer(s): Owen Bradley

Loretta Lynn singles chronology
| "Here I Am Again" (1972) | "Rated "X"" (1972) | "Love Is the Foundation" (1973) |

"Rated "X"" is a 1972 single written and recorded by Loretta Lynn. "Rated "X"" was Lynn's sixth number one country single as a solo artist. The single spent one week at number one and a total of fourteen weeks on the chart. The song dealt with the stigma faced by divorced women during the early 1970s, and was regarded as somewhat controversial at the time, due to its frank language.

== Cover versions ==
In 2001, a live version was used as the B-side of the "Hotel Yorba" single by The White Stripes.

The song was recorded by Neko Case for her 2004 live album The Tigers Have Spoken.

== Legacy ==
In the late 1990s, Jack White, lead singer of rock band The White Stripes, who often noted his admiration of Lynn's music, frequently included "Rated "X"" in the White Stripes' concerts; he and Lynn would eventually collaborate on Lynn's 2004 album Van Lear Rose.

== Chart performance ==
| Chart (1972–1973) | Peak position |
|---|---|
| U.S. Billboard Hot Country Singles | 1 |
| Canadian RPM Country Tracks | 1 |
