= Kid Stuff (Barbara Fairchild song) =

Single by Barbara Fairchild

from the album Kid Stuff
- B-side: "Make No Mistakes"
- Released: July 1973
- Genre: Country
- Label: Columbia
- Songwriter(s): Jerry Crutchfield; Don Earl

Barbara Fairchild singles chronology
"The Teddy Bear Song" (1972)	"Kid Stuff" (1973)	"Baby Doll" (1974)

"Kid Stuff" is a single by American country music artist Barbara Fairchild. Released in July 1973, it was the first single from her album Kid Stuff.

== Background ==
"Kid Stuff" was one in a series of Fairchild songs using childhood themes to express a woman's dismay over broken relationships and the male-dominated hierarchy of traditional ones. Here, a young woman plays upon the childhood game of house and a not-so-fond recollection of playing the game with a little boy, who insists on dominating the proceedings, regardless of the girl's feelings. Now an adult, the woman has entered into a relationship where the man is the dominant figure and is either ignorant or uncaring when she objects. Unlike childhood, the woman bemoans that their relationship is real life, and not just "kid stuff."

== Chart performance ==
The song peaked at number 2 on the Billboard Hot Country Singles chart. It also reached number 1 on the RPM Country Tracks chart in Canada.

Chart (1973)	Peak position
U.S. Billboard Hot Country Singles	2
U.S. Billboard Hot 100	95
Canadian RPM Country Tracks	1
Canadian RPM Top Singles	72
