= I Wonder If They Ever Think of Me =

Single by Merle Haggard and The Strangers

from the album I Love Dixie Blues
- B-side: "I Forget You Every Day"
- Released: December 4, 1972
- Genre: Country
- Length: 2:45
- Label: Capitol
- Songwriter(s): Merle Haggard
- Producer(s): Ken Nelson; Fuzzy Owen

Merle Haggard and The Strangers singles chronology
"It's Not Love (But It's Not Bad)" (1972)	"I Wonder If They Ever Think of Me" (1972)	"The Emptiest Arms in the World" (1973)

"I Wonder If They Ever Think of Me" is a song written and recorded by American country music artist Merle Haggard and The Strangers. It was released in December 1972 as the first single from the album I Love Dixie Blues. The song was Haggard and The Strangers fourteenth number one on the U.S. country singles chart. It was number one for a single week and spent a total of thirteen weeks on the chart.

== Chart performance ==
Chart (1972–1973)	Peak position
US Hot Country Songs (Billboard)	1
Canadian RPM Country Tracks	1
