= Everybody's Had the Blues =

Single by Merle Haggard and The Strangers

from the album I Love Dixie Blues
- B-side: "Nobody Knows I'm Hurtin'
- Released: June 30, 1973
- Genre: Country
- Length: 2:52
- Label: Capitol
- Songwriter(s): Merle Haggard
- Producer(s): Ken Nelson; Fuzzy Owen

Merle Haggard and The Strangers singles chronology
"The Emptiest Arms in the World" (1972)	"Everybody's Had the Blues" (1973)	"If We Make It Through December" (1973)

"Everybody's Had the Blues" is a song written and recorded by American country music artist Merle Haggard and The Strangers. It was released in June 1973 as the third single from the album I Love Dixie Blues.

== Personnel ==
- Merle Haggard– vocals, guitar

The Strangers:

- Roy Nichols – lead guitar
- Norman Hamlet – steel guitar, dobro
- Bobby Wayne – guitar
- Dennis Hromek – bass, background vocals
- Biff Adam – drums

== Chart positions ==
The song was a live recording that was Haggard and The Strangers fifteenth number one on the U.S. country singles chart. The single stayed at number one for two weeks and spent a total of fifteen weeks on the chart. "Everybody's Had the Blues" was a minor pop hit, reaching No. 62 on the Billboard Hot 100 in the fall of 1973.

Chart (1973)	Peak position
US Hot Country Songs (Billboard)	1
US Billboard Hot 100	62
Canadian RPM Country Tracks	1

== Other versions ==
Dean Martin, who also covered other Haggard songs, included the song on his final studio album, The Nashville Sessions, in 1983.
