= Trip to Heaven =

Single by Freddie Hart

from the album Trip to Heaven
- B-side: "Look-a Here"
- Released: May 1973
- Genre: Country
- Label: Capitol
- Songwriter(s): Freddie Hart
- Producer(s): Bob Morris

Freddie Hart singles chronology
"Born a Fool" (1973)	"Trip to Heaven" (1973)	"If You Can't Feel It (It Ain't There)" (1973)

"Trip to Heaven" is a 1973 single by Freddie Hart and the Heartbeats. "Trip to Heaven" was Freddie Hart's sixth and final number one on the country chart. The single stayed at number one for a single week and spent a total of thirteen weeks on the country chart.

== Chart performance ==
Chart (1973)	Peak position
U.S. Billboard Hot Country Singles	1
Canadian RPM Country Tracks	1
