= Ridin' My Thumb to Mexico =

Single by Johnny Rodriguez

from the album All I Ever Meant to Do Was Sing
- B-side: "Release Me"
- Released: August 1973
- Genre: Country
- Length: 2:08
- Label: Mercury
- Songwriter: Johnny Rodriguez
- Producer: Jerry Kennedy

Johnny Rodriguez singles chronology
| "You Always Come Back (To Hurting Me)" (1973) | "Ridin' My Thumb to Mexico" (1973) | "That's the Way Love Goes" (1974) |

"Ridin' My Thumb to Mexico" is a song written and recorded by American country music artist Johnny Rodriguez. It was released in August 1973 as the first single from the album All I Ever Meant to Do Is Sing. The song was Rodriguez's second number one on the U.S. country singles chart. The single stayed at number one for two weeks and spent a total of 13 weeks on the charts.

== Chart performance ==
| Chart (1973) | Peak position |
|---|---|
| US Hot Country Songs (Billboard) | 1 |
| US Billboard Hot 100 | 70 |
| Canadian RPM Country Tracks | 1 |
