= You Always Come Back (To Hurting Me) =

Single by Johnny Rodriguez

from the album Introducing Johnny Rodriguez
- B-side: "I Wonder Where You Are Tonight"
- Released: March 1973
- Genre: Country
- Label: Mercury
- Songwriters: Johnny Rodriguez; Tom T. Hall
- Producer: Jerry Kennedy

Johnny Rodriguez singles chronology
"Pass Me By (If You're Only Passing Through)" (1972)	"You Always Come Back (To Hurting Me)" (1973)	"Ridin' My Thumb to Mexico" (1973)

"You Always Come Back (To Hurting Me)" is a song co-written and recorded by American country music artist Johnny Rodriguez. It was released in March 1973 as the second single from the album Introducing Johnny Rodriguez. It was Rodriguez's second hit on the U.S. country music chart and first number one. The single spent one week at the top and a total of twelve weeks on the chart. The song was written by Rodriguez and Tom T. Hall.

The song made Rodriguez, who was 21 at the time, the youngest male artist to chart a number one country hit. This record stood until 2012, when it was broken by Hunter Hayes' "Wanted".

== Chart performance ==
Chart (1973)	Peak position
US Hot Country Songs (Billboard)	1
US Billboard Hot 100	86
Canadian RPM Country Tracks	1
