= Teddy Bear Song =

Single by Barbara Fairchild

from the album A Sweeter Love
- B-side: "(You Make Me Feel Like) Singing a Song"
- Released: December 1972
- Recorded: June 1972
- Genre: Country
- Length: 3:03
- Label: Columbia
- Songwriter(s): Don Earl; Nick Nixon
- Producer(s): Jerry Crutchfield

Barbara Fairchild singles chronology
"A Sweeter Love (I'll Never Know)" (1972)	"Teddy Bear Song" (1972)	"Kid Stuff" (1973)

"Teddy Bear Song" is a 1973 single written by Don Earl and Nick Nixon, and made famous by country music vocalist Barbara Fairchild. Released in December 1972, the song was Fairchild's only No. 1 song on the Billboard magazine Hot Country Singles chart in March 1973. The song also became a modest pop hit, peaking at No. 32 on the Billboard Hot 100 in June 1973.

== Song background ==
In "Teddy Bear Song," the female protagonist expresses such dismay over poor choices in her life—most notably, a just-ended emotional love affair that ended badly—that she'd rather revert to the innocence of a department store-window teddy bear, as spoken in the song's main tag line, "I wish I was a teddy bear ..." . The song's lyrics depict the carefree, simple existence of the teddy bear she wishes she were: not having to dream, cry or express other emotion (except for a sweetly voiced "Hi, I'm Teddy. Ain't it a lovely day?" from its pull-string-wound internal phonograph,) have regrets, or feel sorry for herself.

"Teddy Bear Song" was the first in a series of Fairchild songs where childhood themes were used to express dismay over broken relationships and the male-dominated hierarchy of traditional relationships. For instance, the follow-up "Kid Stuff" (a No. 2 country hit for Fairchild in October 1973) plays upon the childhood game of house, where a young woman recalls a childhood memory of how she played the game with a little boy, who dominated the game and was uncaring of her feelings; those feelings are re-triggered when as an adult, she enters into a relationship where the man is the dominant figure and is either ignorant or uncaring when she objects.

== Honors ==
"Teddy Bear Song" was nominated for a Grammy Award for Best Country Vocal Performance by a Female in 1974, but did not win.

== Chart performance ==
Chart (1972–1973)	Peak position
U.S. Billboard Hot Country Singles	1
U.S. Billboard Hot 100	32
Australian (Kent Music Report)	28
Canadian RPM Country Tracks	1
Canadian RPM Top Singles	42
Canadian RPM Adult Contemporary Tracks	24

== Cover versions ==
- Several female country vocalists recorded cover versions of "Teddy Bear Song," including Jean Shepard, Connie Smith, Diana Trask, Barbi Benton and Tanya Tucker.
