= Ray Edenton =

American guitarist (1926–2022)

- Birth name: Ray Quarles Edenton
- Born: November 3, 1926; Mineral, Virginia, U.S.
- Died: September 21, 2022 (aged 95); Goodlettsville, Tennessee, U.S.
- Genres: Country, rock and roll
- Occupation: Musician
- Instrument(s): Guitar, mandolin, banjo, bass, ukulele
- Years active: 1949–1991

Ray Quarles Edenton (November 3, 1926 – September 21, 2022) was an American guitarist and country music session musician.

== Early life ==
Ray Edenton was born into a musical family on November 3, 1926, and was raised near Mineral, Virginia. His first instrument was a banjo ukulele, and by the age of six, he was performing with his two brothers and cousins at local square dances.

After serving in the United States Army during World War II, Edenton and guitarist Joe Maphis joined the Korn Krackers, a band that was regularly featured on the Old Dominion Barn Dance show on WRVA, a radio station in Richmond, Virginia. In 1949, Edenton moved to Knoxville, Tennessee to work at radio station WNOX, but was sidelined by a 28-month hospital stay with tuberculosis. Edenton later moved to Nashville, where he began to play acoustic guitar on the Grand Ole Opry.

== Career ==
Edenton is considered one of Nashville's most prolific studio musicians, having played on more than 12,000 recording sessions as a member of The Nashville A-Team. In 1949, he played on his first session: Red Kirk's recording of "Lovesick Blues" for Mercury Records. His first appearance on a major hit was on Webb Pierce's 1953 single "There Stands the Glass". Edenton played on 26 of Pierce's 27 chart-topping country singles, and also played on other well-known recordings, such as the Everly Brothers' "Bye Bye Love" and "Wake Up Little Susie", as well as Marty Robbins' "Singing the Blues", and Roger Miller's "King of the Road".

Edenton accompanied other artists on recordings, including Julie Andrews, the Beach Boys, Gary Burton, Sammy Davis Jr., Henry Mancini, Reba McEntire, Elvis Presley, Johnny Cash, Leon Russell, and Neil Young.

Though Edenton could play lead guitar and a variety of other instruments, he is best known as an acoustic and rhythm guitar player. On some of his earlier recordings, he is miscredited as "Ray Eddington".

Edenton retired in 1991. He died on September 21, 2022, at the age of 95, in Goodlettsville, Tennessee.
