= Barbara Fairchild =

American country and gospel singer (born 1950)

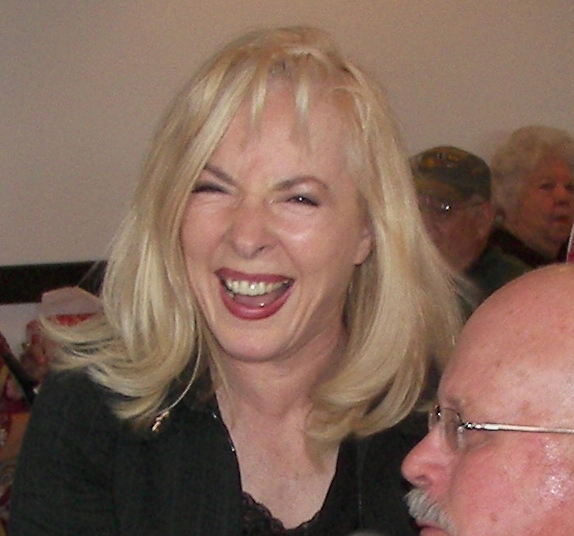
- Fairchild in 2009

Background information
- Born: Barbara Fairchild; November 12, 1950 (age 75); Knobel, Arkansas, United States
- Genres: Country, gospel
- Occupations: Singer, songwriter
- Years active: 1969–present
- Labels: Columbia; Daywind
- Website: Official website

Barbara Fairchild (born November 12, 1950) is an American country and gospel singer, who is best known for her hit 1973 country song "Teddy Bear Song" and other country hits.

== Biography ==
=== Early life and beginnings in Nashville ===
Fairchild was born in Knobel, Arkansas, United States, and started her career at a young age singing country music. She cut her first single at 15 years old. In 1963, she moved to St. Louis, Missouri, and by 1965, she was a regular on a local TV show and recorded for a local label, Norman Records, but her released singles were not much more than regional hits.

In 1968, after high-school graduation, she decided to follow her dream and moved to Nashville. She briefly signed with Kapp Records with no success. She also recorded briefly for MCA Records. After this, she met producer Billy Sherrill, who had discovered Tammy Wynette. He listened to Fairchild's songs and decided that she was ready for a major record deal, and he signed her with Columbia Records in 1969. Her first single in 1969, "Love Is a Gentle Thing", was a minor hit, as was her next single, "A Woman's Hand". In 1970, she scored her first top-40 hit with "A Girl Who'll Satisfy Her Man". Between 1970 and 1972, Fairchild scored four more top-40 hits, the biggest of these being "Love's Old Song" and "Thanks for the Mem'ries".

=== The success of "Teddy Bear Song" ===
Her breakthrough year turned out to be 1973, as she released the biggest hit of her career with "Teddy Bear Song". It became a number-one hit on the country charts, and reached the pop charts, as well, peaking at number 32. It was nominated for a Grammy Award that year. "Teddy Bear Song" spent two weeks at the number-one spot. She followed up "Teddy Bear Song" that year with another hit, "Kid Stuff," which reached number two on the country chart, and made the Billboard Hot 100 at number 95. In 1974, she scored another top 10 with the song "Baby Doll." Between 1974 and 1977, she had several other successes, including "Standing in Your Line", "Little Girl Feelin'", "Mississippi", "Cheatin' Is", and "Let Me Love You Once Before You Go".

=== Later career and life ===
She turned her attention to gospel music, where she has recorded both solo and with Connie Smith and Sharon White on the album, Love Never Fails. She now lives in Branson, Missouri, with her husband, Roy Morris, who is also a singer-songwriter.

== Awards and honors ==
- Inducted into the Christian Music Hall of Fame in 2009.
- Nominated for Christian Country Female Vocalist of the Year for a Visionary Award by the Christian Music Hall of Fame.
