= Billy Sherrill =

American record producer and arranger (1936–2015)

Background information
- Born: Billy Norris Sherrill; November 5, 1936; Phil Campbell, Alabama, U.S.
- Died: August 4, 2015 (aged 78) Nashville, Tennessee, U.S.
- Genres: Country music, countrypolitan
- Occupations: Record producer, arranger, songwriter

Billy Norris Sherrill (November 5, 1936 – August 4, 2015) was an American record producer, songwriter, and arranger associated with country artists, notably Tammy Wynette and George Jones. Sherrill and business partner Glenn Sutton are regarded as the defining influences of the countrypolitan sound, a smooth amalgamation of pop and country music that was popular during the late 1960s and throughout the 1970s. Sherrill also co-wrote many hit songs, including "Stand by Your Man" (written with Tammy Wynette) and "The Most Beautiful Girl" (written with Rory Bourke and Norro Wilson).

== Early years ==
Born in the town of Phil Campbell, Alabama, in 1936, the son of an evangelical preacher, Sherrill was attracted to jazz and blues music, learning to play the piano and, in his teens, the saxophone. During his teenage years, he led a jump blues band, and toured the southern states playing in R&B and rock 'n' roll bands. He signed a solo record deal with a small independent label, which had little success.

== Early career ==
In 1962, Sherrill moved to Nashville, where he was hired by Sam Phillips to manage Phillips Recording's Nashville recording studio. When Phillips sold its Nashville studio the following year, Sherrill was hired by Epic Records to handle A&R and in-house production in Nashville. Given his limited exposure to country music, his production incorporated many elements of pop music production, creating his own style of sweeping productions, influenced by Phil Spector, Don Law, and Chet Atkins. His sound has often been described as a country equivalent to Spector's Wall of Sound. He chose many of his artists' songs, rewriting them in some cases to suit the singer's style.

His first success was with David Houston. Houston's recording of Sherrill's and Glenn Sutton's composition "Livin' in a House Full of Love" reached number 3 on the country chart in late 1965, and followed it up with "Almost Persuaded", also written by Sherrill and Sutton, which spent nine weeks at the top of the U.S. country charts in mid 1966. The song won a Grammy for Best Country & Western Song, and was later recorded by Louis Armstrong, Louis Prima, and Etta James among others. Sherrill continued to write and produce for Houston until the 1970s.

== Work with Tammy Wynette and George Jones ==
Sherrill's association with Wynette began in 1966, when the then-unknown performer auditioned for him. He signed Wynette to Epic, and involved himself in nearly every aspect of the aspiring singer's career, helping her choose her stage name (she was born Virginia Wynette Pugh). He suggested she adopt the name "Tammy". He helped her to develop her stage persona, and co-wrote many of her early country hits, including "Your Good Girl's Gonna Go Bad", "My Elusive Dreams", and "I Don't Wanna Play House". In 1968, Sherrill co-wrote with Wynette her biggest hit, "Stand By Your Man".

By 1971, George Jones had arrived at Epic Records. Jones' recording contract with Musicor Records was still in force in 1971 but a desire between both Jones and his then-wife, Tammy Wynette, to record together led to a buy-out of Jones' contract with Musicor. Soon after, Jones and Wynette began recording together with Sherrill as their producer. Sherrill often played double duty as a songwriter, usually in tandem with Norro Wilson and George Richey. Richey became the future husband of Wynette. Although Billboard chart statistics show that Sherrill had his biggest commercial successes with artists Wynette and Charlie Rich, with Jones Sherrill had his longest association. Sherrill's biggest hit with Jones was "He Stopped Loving Her Today".

In the 1989 video documentary, Same Ole Me, Sherrill recalled a heated exchange during one recording session when Jones insisted on adapting the melody from "Help Me Make It Through the Night": "I said 'That's not the melody!' and he said "Yeah, but it's a better melody.' I said 'It might be — Kristofferson would think so too, it's his melody!'" In the same documentary, Sherrill claimed that Jones was in such bad physical shape during this period that "the recitation was recorded 18 months after the first verse was" and added that the last words Jones said about "He Stopped Loving Her Today" was "Nobody'll buy that morbid son of a bitch" (These comments were repeated during the Ken Burns Country Music series in 2019 though Sherrill had died four years earlier.). Sherrill, once he vacated as the head of CBS/Epic, continued to produce the recordings of Jones throughout the 1980s. Sherrill appeared in the video of Jones' "Who's Gonna Fill Their Shoes" (1985), acting as the bus-driver. Sherrill is credited as Jones record producer for 19 years, 1971–1990.

When news surfaced that the couple were in divorce proceedings, which would eventually last quite a few months, the song that capitalized on this the most was "The Grand Tour" which hit number 1 for Jones in 1974. The song is about a man inviting the listeners to walk through a house with him as he tells about a divorce that took place. The woman left just about everything in the house except a couple of critical items we are told at song's end. When their divorce became final in early 1975, the appropriate songs by Jones released at the time were "Memories of Us" and "I Just Don't Give a Damn". Wynette had a hit during that time period with "'Til I Can Make It On My Own". The duo continued to record through 1976, enjoying several more Top-10 and number 1 hits together such as "Golden Ring", "Southern California", and "Near You", but the duo stopped recording together after the 1976 sessions. They did not team up in the studio again until 1979/1980 with their final hit song being 1980's "Two Story House". Afterwards they didn't record, and rarely appeared, together for 14 years. They embarked on a reunion tour in 1995 in support of their first duet album together in 15 years, One.

In 1991, when Jones left for MCA Records and recorded under Kyle Lehning it was the first time in 20 years that someone other than Sherrill was in the control booth. Lehning became Jones' third record producer. Pappy Daily had produced all of Jones recordings during 1954–1971, and then Sherrill took over the role for the next 19 years. During Jones' stay at MCA almost every album would feature a different producer. Norro Wilson and Buddy Cannon show up more often during the MCA years as Jones' record producers.

== Work with Charlie Rich ==
Another artist who benefited greatly from his association with Sherrill was Charlie Rich. Rich had been a marginally successful performer of blues and early rock and roll, scoring a minor hit with the tune "Lonely Weekends", but it was his early 1970s work with Sherrill, particularly the countrypolitan hits "Behind Closed Doors" and "The Most Beautiful Girl", that brought Rich to national and international prominence. Along with songwriter Norro Wilson, Sherrill won a Grammy Award in 1975 for Best Country Song for Rich's version of the song "A Very Special Love Song".

== Later career ==
By 1975, Sherrill was regarded as "the most reliable hitmaker in Nashville". Other artists with whom Sherrill worked included Barbara Mandrell -- whom he signed to Columbia Records in 1969 -- Sandy Posey, Shelby Lynne, Marty Robbins, Ray Charles, Johnny Paycheck, Tanya Tucker, Johnny Cash, Janie Fricke, Lacy J. Dalton, Ray Conniff, Bobby Vinton, Bob Luman, Johnny Duncan, Jim and Jesse, Jody Miller, Moe Bandy, Joe Stampley, Charlie Walker, Barbara Fairchild, Andy Williams, Cliff Richard ("The Minute You're Gone"), Mickey Gilley, and David Allan Coe. In 1981, he produced Elvis Costello's album Almost Blue. The friction between Costello and Sherrill was aired in a British television documentary.

In 1980, he was appointed Vice President of CBS in Nashville. After leaving to become an independent producer, he returned in 1986 before retiring a few years later.

== Influence and awards ==
In the 1981 made-for-television movie based on Tammy Wynette's book Stand By Your Man, Sherrill was portrayed by James Hampton.

In 2008, Billy Sherrill was inducted into the Musicians Hall of Fame and Museum in Nashville, TN. On February 23, 2010, Sherrill was selected for induction into the Country Music Hall of Fame along with Don Williams, Ferlin Husky, and Jimmy Dean.

== Death ==
Sherrill died after a short illness on August 4, 2015, at the age of 78.
