= Quonset Hut Studio =

Music recording studio in Nashville, Tennessee, U.S.

Bradley Studios
- Formerly: Music City Recordings, Bradley's Film & Recording Studios
- Industry: Recording studio
- Founded: Nashville, Tennessee, U.S. (1955; 71 years ago)
- Founder: Owen Bradley, Harold Bradley
- Defunct: 1982; 44 years ago
- Fate: Closed
- Successor: Columbia Recording Studios
- Headquarters: Nashville, Tennessee, U.S.
- Number of locations: 1

Quonset Hut Studio is the nickname given to Bradley Studios, an independent recording studio complex established in 1954 in Nashville, Tennessee, by brothers Harold and Owen Bradley. The first commercial recording studio facility in what would later become known as Music Row, the studio produced hundreds of hits by artists including Johnny Cash, Conway Twitty, Patsy Cline, Ronnie Self, Red Foley, Brenda Lee, Marty Robbins, Sonny James, and others.

The facility was purchased in 1962 by Columbia Records, who replaced the former residence and Studio A with a newer, larger recording studio, mastering and editing studios, and administrative offices, while keeping Studio B (the Quonset hut studio) intact. Columbia continued to host sessions for various record labels until 1969, when they began using the studios exclusively with Columbia artists. Between 1962 and 1982, hits by Johnny Cash, Bobby Vinton, Bob Dylan, Roger Miller, George Jones, Tammy Wynette, Lynn Anderson, Ray Price, Merle Haggard, Charlie Rich and many others were produced at the studio. CBS closed the facility in 1982.

Record Executive Mike Curb bought the structure in 2006 and restored it; it is now a recording classroom for Belmont University's Mike Curb College of Entertainment & Music Business.

== History ==
=== Bradley Studios ===
Bradley's proposal to build a Nashville recording studio was a response to Paul Cohen, head of Decca Records' country music division, telling Bradley that he was considering moving Decca's country headquarters to Dallas, where Jim Beck had a recording studio.

In 1954, Bradley and his brother Harold Bradley, who had experimented with putting together and running a television/film production studio previously, purchased a house at 804 16th Avenue South in Nashville for $7500 and tore out the first floor of the house to create a 30 x 35-foot basement recording space with 20-foot high ceiling. Initially called Music City Recordings, it was the first recording studio in what would become Music Row. The first song recorded at the studio was "Be-Bop-a-Lula" by Gene Vincent and His Blue Caps.

The Bradleys' new studio, Music City Recorders, hosted recording sessions that produced hits for Roy Acuff, and Ray Price, as well as Buddy Holly's recording sessions for Decca.

In 1955 the Bradleys bought an Army surplus Quonset hut and attached it to the back of the house to create a 78 x 35-foot sound stage for filming musical performances, and renamed the studios to Bradleys' Film & Recording Studios in 1957. The Bradleys produced several Country Style, USA film programs in the Quonset hut, but the demand for recording music in the Quonset hut (which was much larger than the house's basement Studio A) eventually overtook the Bradley's film production business, and the Bradleys purchased a three-track mixing console from Decca and built a control room in the Quonset hut to turn it into Studio B. The Quonset hut location of Studio B also offered sufficient space for recording the musical elements essential to the developing Nashville sound, such as orchestras and string sections.

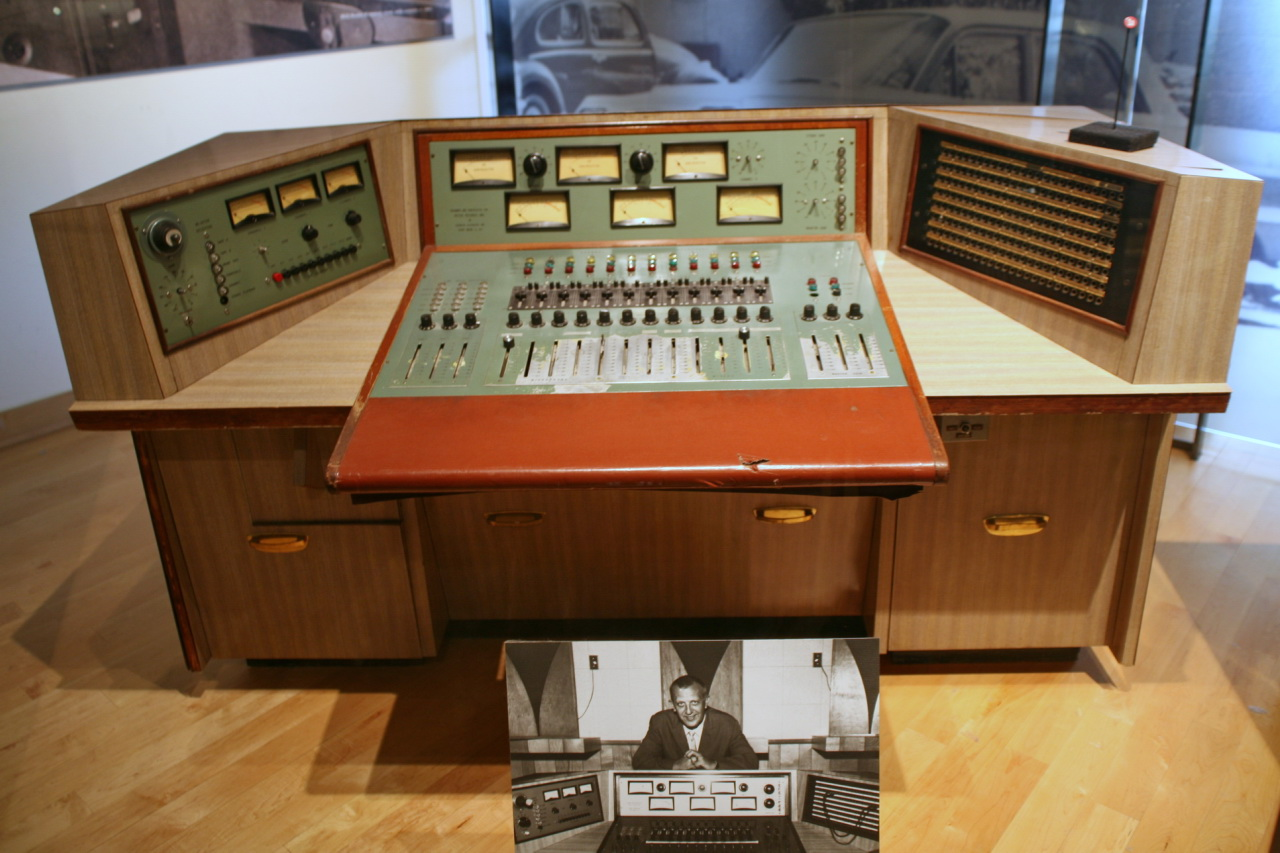
Mixing console used by Bradley Studio B

A steady string of hits were produced at Bradley Studios, including Sonny James' "Young Love", and Ferlin Husky's "Gone", as well as Conway Twitty's first hit single "It's Only Make Believe" in 1958. That same year Johnny Cash recorded his second studio album at the studio following his departure from Sun Records. The No. 1 song for 1959, Johnny Horton's "The Battle of New Orleans", was recorded at Bradley Studios, as was Mark Dinning's hit song "Teen Angel". Recording sessions were often accomplished with session musicians that came to be known as the Nashville A-Team, as well as vocal backing groups such as the Jordanaires and the Anita Kerr Quartet.

In 1957, Patsy Cline recorded "Walkin' After Midnight" with Bradley in Studio B, the first of several of the artist's classic songs recorded at the studio, including "I Fall to Pieces" and "Crazy". In 1958, Bradley asked a 13-year old Brenda Lee to record "Rockin' Around the Christmas Tree" at the studio, and the artist continued to record at the studio with Bradley through the early 1960s, including her signature song "I'm Sorry".

In 1961, during the recording of Marty Robbins' song "Don't Worry" at the studios, a defect in the mixing console unexpectedly transformed session musician Grady Martin's guitar tone into an unusual distorted sound. "I'm pretty sure what happened was the primary transformer opened up, causing session player Grady Martin's guitar sound to go from clean to bludgeoning", Snoddy told The Tennessean in 2013. As "Don't Worry" topped the country charts and crossed over to the pop charts, the unique sound of the mixing console's faulty channel rapidly became sought after in Nashville studios. Snoddy and fellow WSM radio engineer Revis Virgil Hobbs built a stand-alone device entirely based around three 1n270 germanium transistors that would intentionally recreate the novel fuzzy effect, and the two engineers sold their circuit to Gibson, who commercialized the device in 1962 under the name Maestro FZ-1 Fuzz-Tone.

=== Columbia Studios ===
In January 1962, the Bradleys sold Bradley Studios to Columbia Records for $300,000, with Columbia assuming operation on February 1. The sale agreement included a non-compete clause that the Bradleys would not operate a studio in Davidson County and would not open another recording studio within two years. Under Columbia's ownership, the studios initially continued hosting recording sessions for Decca, Mercury, Epic, Capitol, and other labels in addition to Columbia artists.

In 1963, Johnny Cash returned to the Quonset hut studio and recorded his hit song "Ring of Fire", and would later record "Jackson" at the studio with June Carter in 1967. In 1963, Bobby Vinton recorded his No. 1 song "Blue Velvet" at the studio, and the same year, Loretta Lynn recorded her first studio album there, the first of five she would record at the studio.

The same year, Columbia announced plans to demolish the former residential structure housing Studio A in order to construct a new three-story office building with estimated cost of $100,000 that included a new, larger recording studio, two editing rooms, two mastering rooms, a musicians' lounge, and an engineering room. The new building's address was 804 16th Avenue South (which would become 34 Music Square East when the street was renamed in 1975). The revered Studio B in the Quonset hut attached to the rear of the building was retained, while the new Studio A, which measured 58 feet by 37 feet wide, and was 25 feet high, opened on October 22, 1965.

In 1966 on the suggestion of producer Bob Johnston, the recording sessions for Bob Dylan's album Blonde on Blonde were moved from Columbia's studios in New York City to Nashville, and that album was followed up by John Wesley Harding (1967) and Nashville Skyline (1969), all recorded at Columbia Studio A in Nashville. Johnston himself became head of Columbia in Nashville, and produced albums for Leonard Cohen at the studio, including Songs from a Room (1969) and Songs of Love and Hate (1971). Dylan's positive results attracted other folk artists, including Joan Baez and Ian & Sylvia, to record at Columbia's studios beginning in the late 1960s.

In 1967, Tammy Wynette recorded her debut studio album at Columbia's Nashville studios, and would record there almost exclusively through the 1970s, including several duet albums with George Jones. In 1968, Jeannie C. Riley recorded her hit "Harper Valley PTA" at the studio.

In 1969, Lynn Anderson recorded the album Rose Garden and its crossover country and pop hit title track at Columbia A, with the song winning Anderson the Grammy Award for Best Female Country Vocal Performance at the 13th Annual Grammy Awards in 1971.

In 1970, Ray Price recorded For the Good Times, the best-selling album of the artist's career. In 1973, Merle Haggard and the Strangers recorded If We Make It Through December in the Quonset hut studio (Columbia B). The same year, Charlie Rich recorded his hit album Behind Closed Doors at the studio, including the hit title track and the even more successful follow-up release, "The Most Beautiful Girl".

In 1981, Elvis Costello and the Attractions chose Columbia Studio A in Nashville to record Almost Blue, a covers album of country music songs. Other artists who recorded at Columbia's Nashville studios included George Jones, Dusty Springfield, the Byrds, Patti Page, Lacy J. Dalton, Dave Loggins, John Hiatt, and Johnny Paycheck.

In 1982, John Anderson's album Wild & Blue was the last to be recorded at the studio before Columbia closed their Nashville recording studios and converted them to office space.

=== Restoration ===
In 2005, philanthropist Mike Curb bought the structure and had it restored. Studio B was reopened as a recording classroom for Belmont University's Mike Curb College of Entertainment & Music Business in 2009, with Studio A following in 2014.

== Legacy ==
In 2011, the Mike Curb Foundation and The Historical Commission of Metropolitan Nashville and Davidson County erected a historical marker for Bradley Studios at the intersection of Music Square East and Music Circle South.

Toontrack produced an expansion library for their EZdrummer software drum instrument, Traditional Country EZX, at Columbia Studio B in the Quonset hut.

== See also ==
- Owen Bradley
- Music Row
- The Nashville A-Team
- Nashville sound
