= Billboard Top Movie Hits =

Compilation album by Various artists
- Released: April 23, 1996
- Recorded: 1940s–1970s
- Label: Rhino

Billboard Top Movie Hits is a series of compilation albums released by Rhino Records in April 1996 featuring recordings popularized through their use in movies released from the 1940s through the 1970s. Five albums were released in the series, each containing ten songs from a specified five- or ten-year period.

== 1940s ==
Professional ratings
Review scores
Source	Rating
Allmusic	3/5 stars

1. "I've Heard That Song Before" (From Youth on Parade) – Helen Forrest, Harry James & His Orchestra
2. "Zip-A-Dee-Doo-Dah" (From Song of the South) – James Baskett
3. "Swinging on a Star" (From Going My Way) – Bing Crosby, John Scott Trotter and The Williams Brothers Quartet
4. "My Dreams Are Getting Better All the Time" (From In Society) – Doris Day, Les Brown & His Orchestra
5. "Boogie Woogie Bugle Boy" (From Buck Privates) – Andrews Sisters, Vic Schoen & His Orchestra
6. "You'll Never Know" (From Hello, Frisco, Hello) – Dick Haymes & The Song Spinners
7. "(I Got Spurs That) Jingle, Jangle, Jingle" (From The Forest Rangers) – Harry Babbiyt, Kay Kyser & His Orchestra
8. "It's Magic" (From Romance on the High Seas) – Doris Day
9. "Doctor, Lawyer, Indian Chief" (From The Stork Club) – Betty Hutton, Paul Weston & His Orchestra
10. "As Time Goes By" (From Casablanca) – Rudy Vallee

== 1950-1954 ==
Professional ratings
Review scores
Source	Rating
Allmusic	3/5 stars

1. "The Song from Moulin Rouge (Where Is Your Heart?)" (From Moulin Rouge) – Felicia Sanders, Percy Faith & His Orchestra
2. "Three Coins in the Fountain" (From Three Coins in the Fountain) – Four Aces, Al Alberts with Chorus
3. "Aba Daba Honeymoon" (From Two Weeks with Love) – Debbie Reynolds, Carleton Carpenter
4. "The High and the Mighty" (From The High and the Mighty) – Victor Young & His Singing Strings
5. "Ruby" (From Ruby Gentry) – Richard Hayman & His Orchestra
6. "Secret Love" (From Calamity Jane) – Doris Day
7. "Ol' Man River" (From Show Boat) – William Warfield
8. "Anywhere I Wander" (From Hans Christian Andersen) – Julius LaRosa
9. "Anna" (From Anna) – Silvana Mangano
10. "High Noon (Do Not Forsake Me)" (From High Noon) – Frankie Laine

== 1955-1959 ==
Professional ratings
Review scores
Source	Rating
Allmusic	3/5 stars

1. "Unchained Melody" (From Unchained) – Les Baxter and His Chorus and Orchestra
2. "Love Is a Many-Splendored Thing" (From Love Is a Many-Splendored Thing) – The Four Aces, Al Alberts
3. "It's Not for Me to Say" (From Lizzie) – Johnny Mathis, Ray Conniff
4. "Moonglow" (Theme from Picnic) – Morris Stoloff and the Columbia Pictures Orchestra
5. "Tammy" (From Tammy and the Bachelor) – Debbie Reynolds
6. "April Love" (From April Love) – Pat Boone
7. "Que Sera, Sera (Whatever Will Be, Will Be)" (From The Man Who Knew Too Much) – Doris Day, Frank De Vol and His Orchestra
8. "Cherry Pink and Apple Blossom White" (From Underwater!) – Perez Prado and His Orchestra, Billy Regis
9. "Fascination" (From Love in the Afternoon) – Jane Morgan & the Troubadours
10. "The Man with the Golden Arm" (Main Title) (From The Man with the Golden Arm) – Elmer Bernstein and His Orchestra, Shelly Manne

== 1960s ==
Professional ratings
Review scores
Source	Rating
Allmusic	3/5 stars

1. "Theme from A Summer Place" – Percy Faith & His Orchestra
2. "Exodus" (From Exodus) – Ferrante & Teicher
3. "(Theme from) Valley of the Dolls (From Valley of the Dolls) – Dionne Warwick
4. "Jean" (From The Prime of Miss Jean Brodie) – Oliver
5. "Love Theme from Romeo and Juliet – Henry Mancini & His Orchestra
6. "Raindrops Keep Fallin' on My Head" (from Butch Cassidy and the Sundance Kid) – B.J. Thomas
7. "Ballad of the Alamo" (From The Alamo) – Marty Robbins
8. "Hush, Hush, Sweet Charlotte" (from Hush... Hush, Sweet Charlotte) – Patti Page
9. "Born Free" (from Born Free) – Roger Williams
10. "Moon River" (From Breakfast at Tiffany's) – Henry Mancini & His Orchestra

== 1970s ==
Professional ratings
Review scores
Source	Rating
Allmusic	3/5 stars

1. "Star Wars (Main Title)" (Album version) (from Star Wars) – London Symphony Orchestra
2. "Midnight Cowboy" (from Midnight Cowboy) – Ferrante & Teicher
3. "Every Which Way but Loose" (from Every Which Way but Loose) – Eddie Rabbitt
4. "Theme from Shaft" (from Shaft) – Isaac Hayes
5. "Gonna Fly Now" (from Rocky) – Bill Conti
6. "You Light Up My Life" (from You Light Up My Life) – Debby Boone
7. "The Entertainer" (from The Sting) – Marvin Hamlisch
8. "I Got a Name" (from The Last American Hero) – Jim Croce
9. "Dueling Banjos" (from Deliverance) – Eric Weissberg & Steve Mandell
10. "Theme from Close Encounters of the Third Kind" (From Close Encounters of the Third Kind) - John Williams
