= List of Top Country LP's number ones of 1973 =

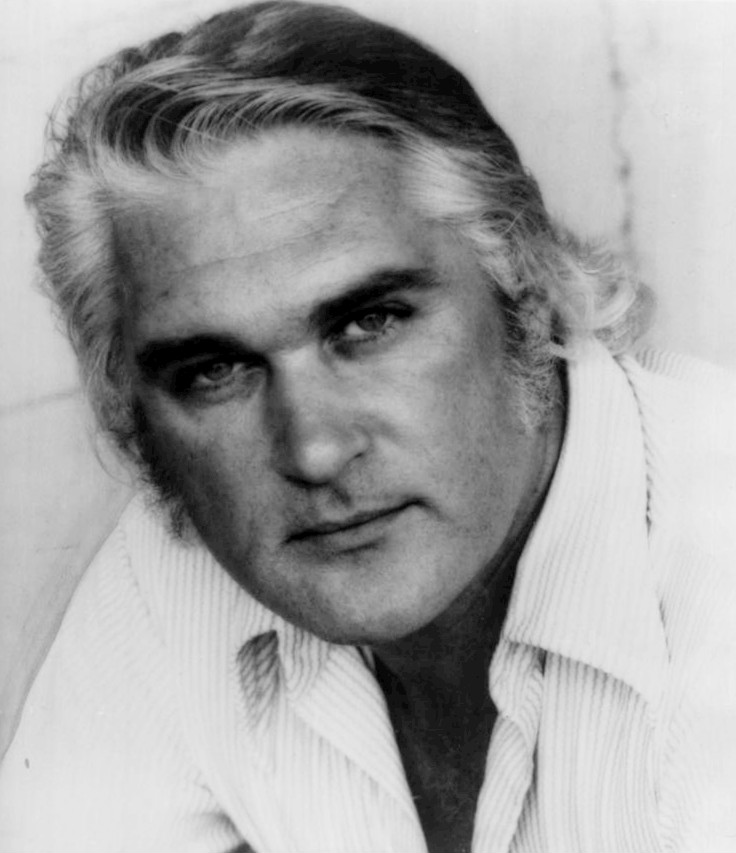
Charlie Rich topped the chart with Behind Closed Doors, which went on to set a new record for the most weeks spent by an album at number one.

Top Country Albums is a chart that ranks the top-performing country music albums in the United States, published by Billboard. In 1973, 21 different albums topped the chart, which was at the time published under the title Top Country LP's, based on sales reports submitted by a representative sample of stores nationwide.

In the issue of Billboard dated January 6, Merle Haggard was at number one with the compilation album The Best of the Best of Merle Haggard, the record's seventh week in the top spot. The following week, it was displaced from the top spot by Got the All Overs for You by Freddie Hart and the Heartbeats, but Haggard returned to number one in the issue dated January 27 with It's Not Love (But It's Not Bad). He achieved a third number one in September with I Love Dixie Blues...So I Recorded "Live" In New Orleans and was one of two artists with three chart-toppers during the year. The other was Loretta Lynn, who reached number one with Entertainer of the Year – Loretta and Love Is the Foundation as well as Louisiana Woman, Mississippi Man, a collaboration with Conway Twitty. The two singers had a run of success with duet recordings in the early 1970s alongside their ongoing solo careers.

Kris Kristofferson was one of several artists with two number one albums in 1973, topping the chart in consecutive weeks with Jesus Was a Capricorn and Full Moon, the latter a collaboration with Rita Coolidge, his then-wife. Full Moon's time at number one was ended by Marie Osmond, the younger sister of teen-pop stars the Osmonds, who achieved her first chart-topping album at the age of 14. Jeanne Pruett had the year's longest unbroken run at number one, spending eight consecutive weeks at the top of the listing with her album Satin Sheets. Charlie Rich spent four non-consecutive weeks at number one in June and July with his album Behind Closed Doors. Having released his first records in the 1950s, Rich had finally achieved country music success in 1972 and become a mainstream star the following year. Five months after it left the top spot, the album returned to number one in December, in the same week that Rich's song "The Most Beautiful Girl" reached number one on Billboard's all-genre singles chart, the Hot 100. The album would continue its success into 1974 and eventually spend a total of 21 weeks atop the chart, a new record total for an album.

== Chart history ==
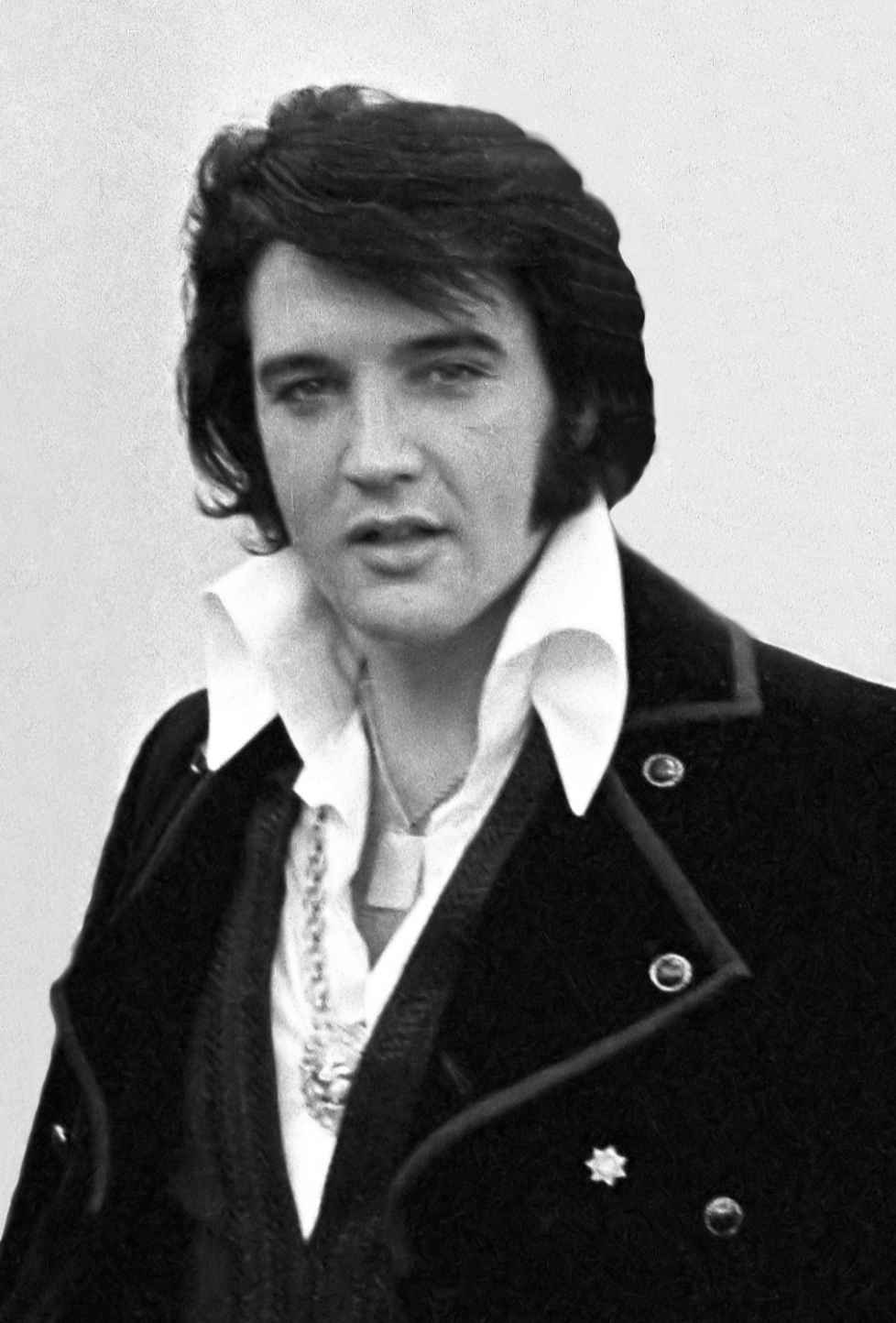
"King of Rock and Roll" Elvis Presley achieved his first number one country album with Aloha from Hawaii Via Satellite.

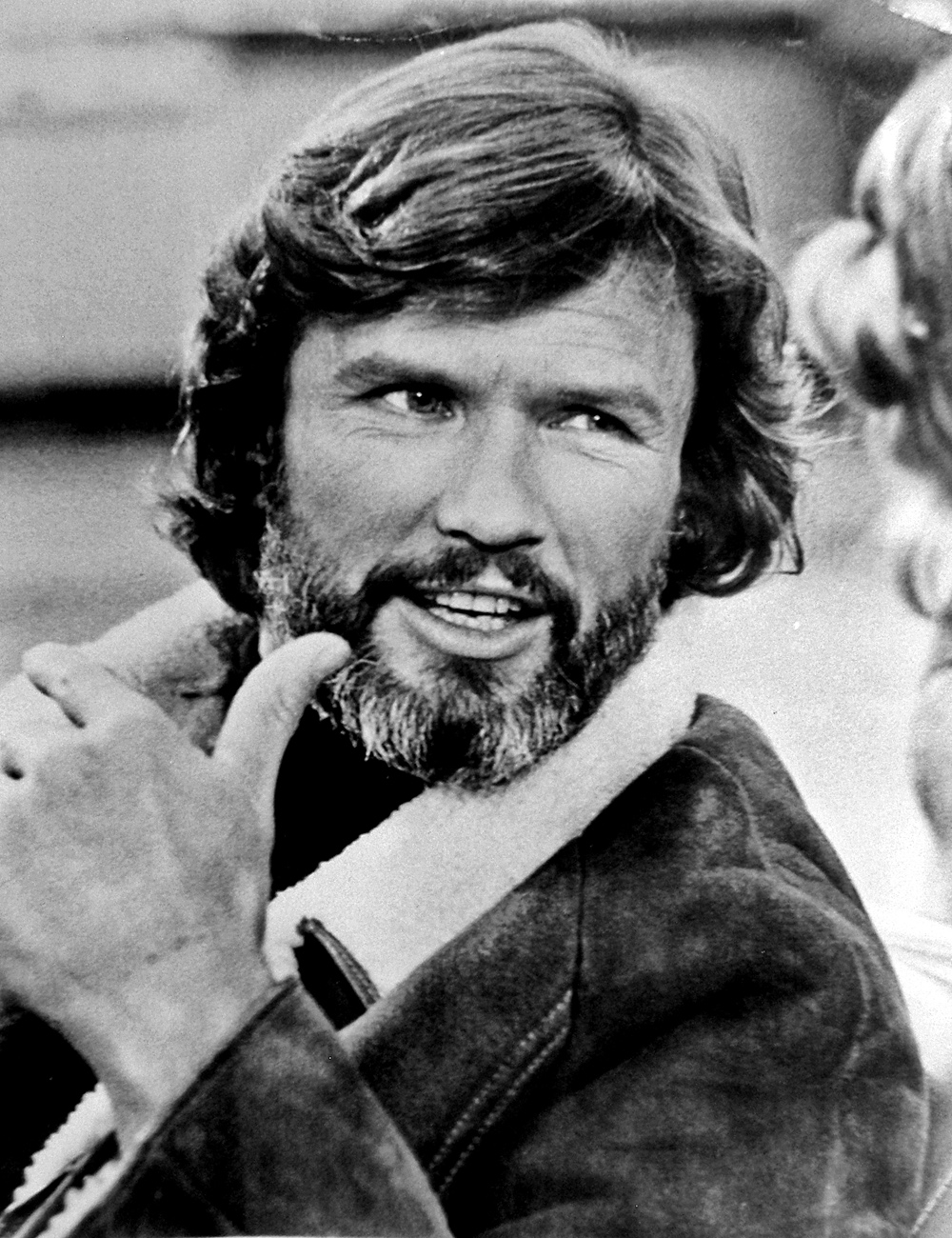
Two consecutive number ones in November were by Kris Kristofferson, the second a collaboration with his then-wife Rita Coolidge.

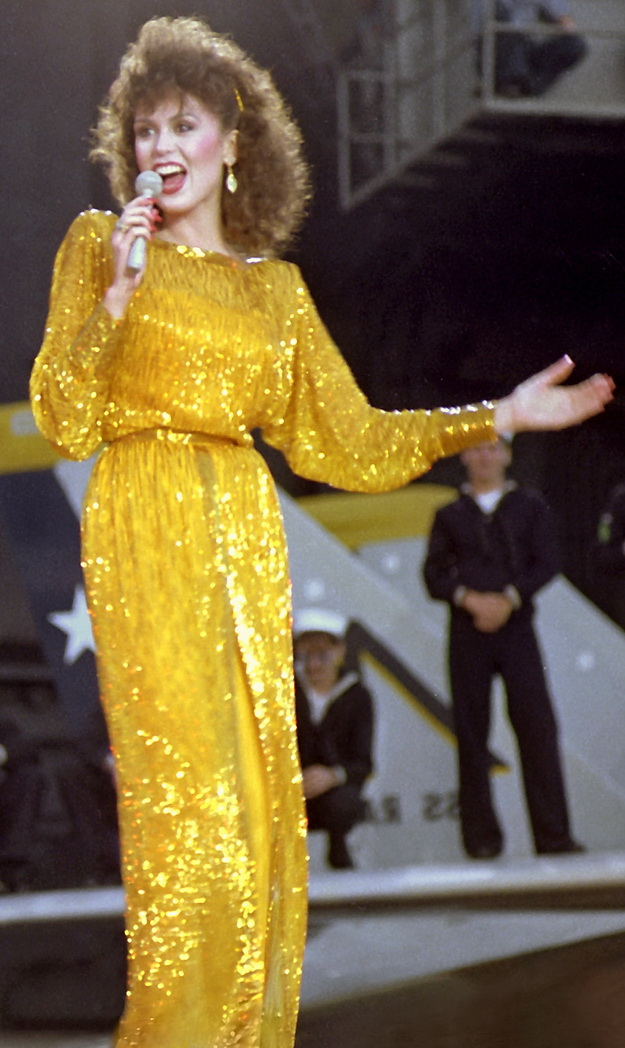
Marie Osmond was 14 years old when her album Paper Roses reached number one.

Issue date	Title	Artist(s)	Ref.
January 6	The Best of the Best of Merle Haggard	Merle Haggard	
January 13	Got the All Overs for You	Freddie Hart and the Heartbeats	
January 20	Got the All Overs for You	Freddie Hart and the Heartbeats	
January 27	It's Not Love (But It's Not Bad)	Merle Haggard and the Strangers	
February 3	It's Not Love (But It's Not Bad)	Merle Haggard and the Strangers	
February 10	It's Not Love (But It's Not Bad)	Merle Haggard and the Strangers	
February 17	Songs of Love by Charley Pride	Charley Pride	
February 24	Songs of Love by Charley Pride	Charley Pride	
March 3	Songs of Love by Charley Pride	Charley Pride	
March 10	Songs of Love by Charley Pride	Charley Pride	
March 17	Dueling Banjos	Eric Weissberg and Steve Mandell	
March 24	Dueling Banjos	Eric Weissberg and Steve Mandell	
March 31	Dueling Banjos	Eric Weissberg and Steve Mandell	
April 7	Dueling Banjos	Eric Weissberg and Steve Mandell	
April 14	Aloha from Hawaii Via Satellite	Elvis Presley	
April 21	Aloha from Hawaii Via Satellite	Elvis Presley	
April 28	Aloha from Hawaii Via Satellite	Elvis Presley	
May 5	Aloha from Hawaii Via Satellite	Elvis Presley	
May 12	My Second Album	Donna Fargo	
May 19	Super Kind of Woman	Freddie Hart and the Heartbeats	
May 26	Introducing Johnny Rodriguez	Johnny Rodriguez	
June 2	Entertainer of the Year – Loretta	Loretta Lynn	
June 9	The Rhymer and Other Five and Dimers	Tom T. Hall	
June 16	Behind Closed Doors	Charlie Rich	
June 23	Behind Closed Doors	Charlie Rich	
June 30	Behind Closed Doors	Charlie Rich	
July 7	Good Time Charlie	Charlie McCoy	
July 14	Behind Closed Doors	Charlie Rich	
July 21	Satin Sheets	Jeanne Pruett	
July 28	Satin Sheets	Jeanne Pruett	
August 4	Satin Sheets	Jeanne Pruett	
August 11	Satin Sheets	Jeanne Pruett	
August 18	Satin Sheets	Jeanne Pruett	
August 25	Satin Sheets	Jeanne Pruett	
September 1	Satin Sheets	Jeanne Pruett	
September 8	Satin Sheets	Jeanne Pruett	
September 15	Louisiana Woman, Mississippi Man	Conway Twitty and Loretta Lynn	
September 22	I Love Dixie Blues...So I Recorded "Live" In New Orleans	Merle Haggard and the Strangers	
September 29	I Love Dixie Blues...So I Recorded "Live" In New Orleans	Merle Haggard and the Strangers	
October 6	You've Never Been This Far Before / Baby's Gone	Conway Twitty	
October 13	You've Never Been This Far Before / Baby's Gone	Conway Twitty	
October 20	You've Never Been This Far Before / Baby's Gone	Conway Twitty	
October 27	Love Is the Foundation	Loretta Lynn	
November 3	Jesus Was a Capricorn	Kris Kristofferson	
November 10	Full Moon	Kris Kristofferson and Rita Coolidge	
November 17	Paper Roses	Marie Osmond	
November 24	Paper Roses	Marie Osmond	
December 1	Paper Roses	Marie Osmond	
December 8	Primrose Lane / Don't Give Up On Me	Jerry Wallace	
December 15	Behind Closed Doors	Charlie Rich	
December 22	Behind Closed Doors	Charlie Rich	
December 29	Behind Closed Doors	Charlie Rich	
