= List of Billboard 200 number-one albums of 1973 =

These are the Billboard magazine number-one albums of 1973, per the Billboard 200.

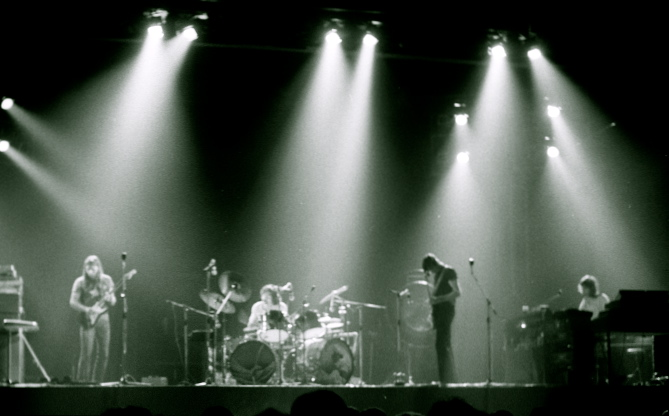
Despite only spending one week at number one, Pink Floyd's The Dark Side of the Moon was the best-selling album of 1973.

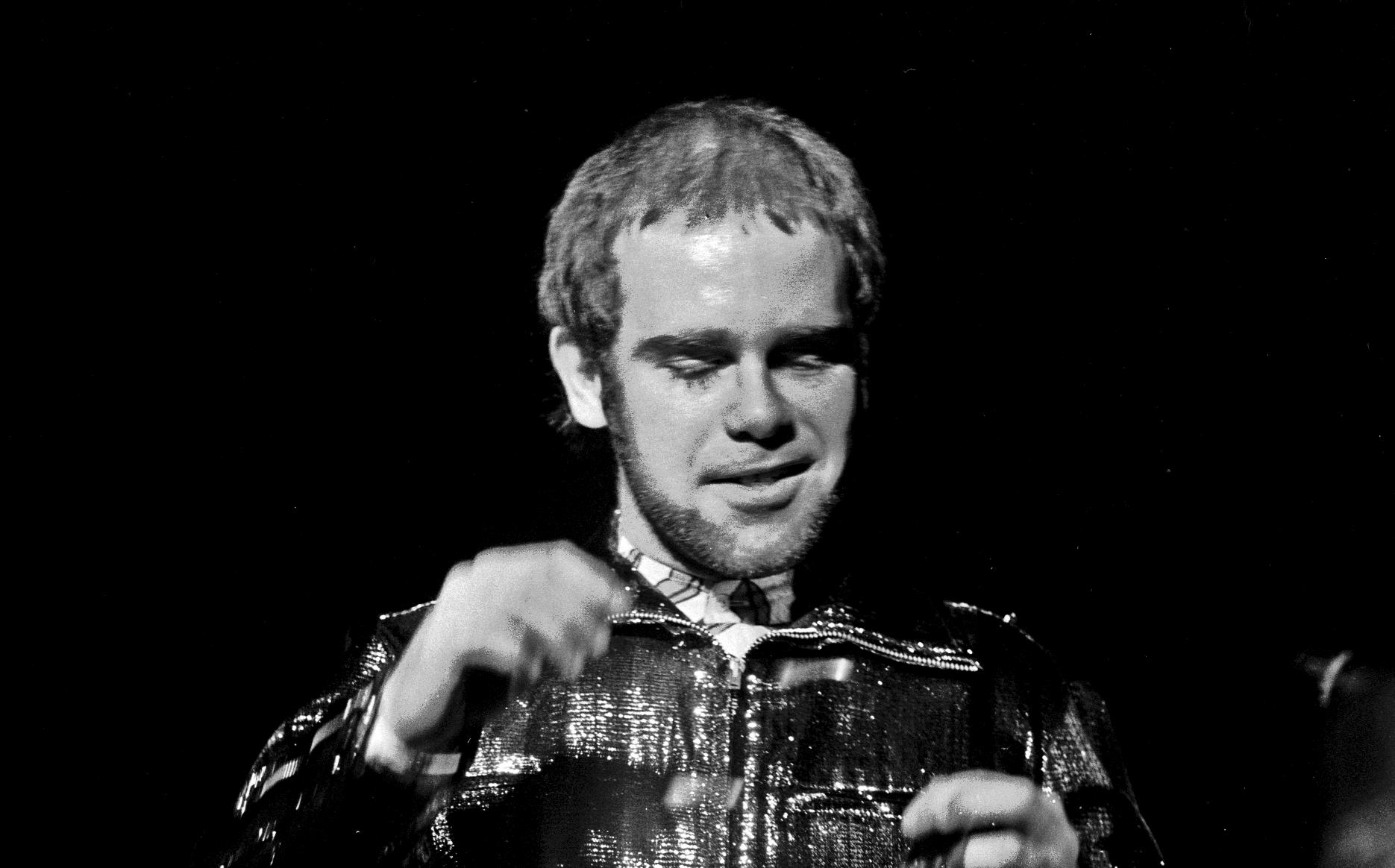
Elton John had two number one albums in 1973, Don't Shoot Me I'm Only the Piano Player and Goodbye Yellow Brick Road, which spent a cumulative ten weeks at number one.

== Chart history ==
Key
†	Indicates best performing album of 1973

Issue date	Album	Artist(s)	Label	Ref.
January 6	Seventh Sojourn	The Moody Blues	Threshold	
January 13	No Secrets	Carly Simon	Elektra	
January 20	No Secrets	Carly Simon	Elektra	
January 27	No Secrets	Carly Simon	Elektra	
February 3	No Secrets	Carly Simon	Elektra	
February 10	No Secrets	Carly Simon	Elektra	
February 17	The World Is a Ghetto	War	United Artists	
February 24	The World Is a Ghetto	War	United Artists	
March 3	Don't Shoot Me I'm Only the Piano Player	Elton John	MCA	
March 10	Don't Shoot Me I'm Only the Piano Player	Elton John	MCA	
March 17	Dueling Banjos	Eric Weissberg & Steve Mandell	Warner Bros.	
March 24	Dueling Banjos	Eric Weissberg & Steve Mandell	Warner Bros.	
March 31	Dueling Banjos	Eric Weissberg & Steve Mandell	Warner Bros.	
April 7	Lady Sings the Blues	Diana Ross / Soundtrack	Motown	
April 14	Lady Sings the Blues	Diana Ross / Soundtrack	Motown	
April 21	Billion Dollar Babies	Alice Cooper	Warner Bros.	
April 28	The Dark Side of the Moon †	Pink Floyd	Harvest	
May 5	Aloha from Hawaii Via Satellite	Elvis Presley	RCA	
May 12	Houses of the Holy	Led Zeppelin	Atlantic	
May 19	Houses of the Holy	Led Zeppelin	Atlantic	
May 26	1967–1970	The Beatles	Apple	
June 2	Red Rose Speedway	Paul McCartney and Wings	Apple	
June 9	Red Rose Speedway	Paul McCartney and Wings	Apple	
June 16	Red Rose Speedway	Paul McCartney and Wings	Apple	
June 23	Living in the Material World	George Harrison	Apple	
June 30	Living in the Material World	George Harrison	Apple	
July 7	Living in the Material World	George Harrison	Apple	
July 14	Living in the Material World	George Harrison	Apple	
July 21	Living in the Material World	George Harrison	Apple	
July 28	Chicago VI	Chicago	Columbia	
August 4	Chicago VI	Chicago	Columbia	
August 11	Chicago VI	Chicago	Columbia	
August 18	A Passion Play	Jethro Tull	Chrysalis	
August 25	Chicago VI	Chicago	Columbia	
September 1	Chicago VI	Chicago	Columbia	
September 8	Brothers and Sisters	The Allman Brothers Band	Capricorn	
September 15	Brothers and Sisters	The Allman Brothers Band	Capricorn	
September 22	Brothers and Sisters	The Allman Brothers Band	Capricorn	
September 29	Brothers and Sisters	The Allman Brothers Band	Capricorn	
October 6	Brothers and Sisters	The Allman Brothers Band	Capricorn	
October 13	Goats Head Soup	The Rolling Stones	Rolling Stones	
October 20	Goats Head Soup	The Rolling Stones	Rolling Stones	
October 27	Goats Head Soup	The Rolling Stones	Rolling Stones	
November 3	Goats Head Soup	The Rolling Stones	Rolling Stones	
November 10	Goodbye Yellow Brick Road	Elton John	MCA	
November 17	Goodbye Yellow Brick Road	Elton John	MCA	
November 24	Goodbye Yellow Brick Road	Elton John	MCA	
December 1	Goodbye Yellow Brick Road	Elton John	MCA	
December 8	Goodbye Yellow Brick Road	Elton John	MCA	
December 15	Goodbye Yellow Brick Road	Elton John	MCA	
December 22	Goodbye Yellow Brick Road	Elton John	MCA	
December 29	Goodbye Yellow Brick Road	Elton John	MCA	

== See also ==
- 1973 in music
- List of number-one albums (United States)
