= Marshall Brickman =

American screenwriter and director (1939–2024)

- Born: Marshall Jacob Brickman; August 25, 1939; Rio de Janeiro, Brazil
- Died: November 29, 2024 (aged 85); New York City, U.S.
- Education: Brooklyn Technical High School, University of Wisconsin–Madison
- Occupations: Writer; director; musician
- Spouse: Nina Feinberg (m. 1973)
- Children: 2

Marshall Jacob Brickman (August 25, 1939 – November 29, 2024) was an American screenwriter and director, best known for his collaborations with Woody Allen, with whom he shared the 1977 Academy Award for Best Original Screenplay for Annie Hall. He was previously the head writer for Johnny Carson, writing scripts for recurring characters such as Carnac the Magnificent. He is also known for playing the mandolin and banjo with Eric Weissberg in the 1960s, for a series of comical parodies published in The New Yorker, and for his co-authoring the books for the Broadway musicals Jersey Boys and The Addams Family Musical with Rick Elice.

== Life and career ==
=== Early years and education ===
Marshall Jacob Brickman was born on August 25, 1939, in Rio de Janeiro, Brazil, to American parents Pauline (née Wolin) and Abram Brickman. His parents were Jewish. His father immigrated from Poland. The family returned to the United States in 1943, and Brickman grew up in Flatbush, Brooklyn.

Brickman was a 1956 graduate of Brooklyn Technical High School, where he was an honor roll student and a participant in WNYE. After attending the University of Wisconsin–Madison, where he studied science and music and briefly aspired to be a doctor, he became a member of folk act the Tarriers in 1962, recruited by former classmate Eric Weissberg. A banjo album that he and Weissberg recorded around this time was later re-licensed as the bulk of the soundtrack to the 1972 film Deliverance. Following the disbanding of the Tarriers in 1965, Brickman joined the New Journeymen with John Phillips and Michelle Phillips, who later had success with the Mamas & the Papas.

=== Career ===
Brickman left the New Journeymen to pursue a career as a writer, initially writing for television in the 1960s, including Candid Camera, The Tonight Show, and The Dick Cavett Show. It was during this time that he met Allen, with whom he would collaborate on three completed film screenplays during the 1970s: Sleeper (1973), Annie Hall (1977, which won the Best Original Screenplay Oscar), and Manhattan (1979). In 2015, members of the Writers Guild of America voted Annie Hall as the funniest screenplay ever written.

Brickman directed several of his own scripts in the 1980s, including Simon, Lovesick, and The Manhattan Project, as well as Sister Mary Explains It All, a TV adaptation of the play by Christopher Durang. His script with Allen for Manhattan Murder Mystery (1993) had been put aside some years earlier when the project was later revived.

With partner Rick Elice, he wrote the book for the Broadway musical Jersey Boys, about 1960s rock 'n' roll group The Four Seasons. The two collaborated again in 2009 to write the book for the musical The Addams Family.

Brickman's "Who's Who in the Cast," a parody of a Playbill cast list, was published in the July 26, 1976, issue of The New Yorker, and drew so much attention that it was republished in the special theatre issue of May 31, 1993. His other pieces for The New Yorker include "The Recipes of Chairman Mao" (August 27, 1973) and "The New York Review of Gossip" (May 19, 1975).

=== Personal life and death ===
In 1973, Brickman married Nina Feinberg, with whom he had two daughters. He had previously been married to Michelle Phillips' sister, Russell Ann Gilliam. He died in Manhattan on November 29, 2024, at the age of 85.

== Works ==
=== Film ===
Year	Title	Director	Writer
1973	Sleeper	No	Yes
1974	Ann in Blue	No	Yes
1977	Annie Hall	No	Yes
1979	Manhattan	No	Yes
1980	Simon	Yes	Yes
1983	Lovesick	Yes	Yes
1986	The Manhattan Project	Yes	Yes
1991	For the Boys	No	Yes
1993	Manhattan Murder Mystery	No	Yes
1994	Intersection	No	Yes
2001	Sister Mary Explains It All	Yes	No
2014	Jersey Boys	No	Yes

=== Television ===
Year	Title	Director	Writer
1975	The Muppet Show: Sex and Violence	No	Yes

=== Theatre ===
Year	Title	Notes	Venue
1975	Straws in the Wind	Sketches, Book	Off-Broadway
2005	Jersey Boys	Book (with Rick Elice). Nominated Best Book of a Musical Tony Award	August Wilson Theatre
2010	The Addams Family	Book (with Rick Elice)	Lunt-Fontanne Theatre

== See also ==
- List of Jewish Academy Award winners and nominees
