= The Tarriers =

American folk music group

- Origin: New York City
- Genres: Folk, pop
- Years active: 1956–1965
- Labels: Glory Records, President, United Artists, Atlantic, Brunswick, Decca
- Past members: Erik Darling; Bob Carey; Karl Karlton; Alan Arkin; Clarence Cooper; Eric Weissberg; Marshall Brickman; Al Dana

The Tarriers were an American vocal group, specializing in folk music and folk-flavored popular music. Named after the folk song "Drill, Ye Tarriers, Drill", the group had two hit songs during 1956-57: "Cindy, Oh Cindy" (with Vince Martin) and "The Banana Boat Song." The two singles became US Top Ten hits and peaked at No. 26 and No. 15 respectively in the UK Singles Chart.

== Career ==
The group formed from a collection of folk singers who performed regularly at Washington Square in New York City during the mid-1950s, including Erik Darling and Bob Carey. "Eventually it became the Tarriers, with Bob, me, Karl Karlton and Alan Arkin," Darling told Wayne Jancik in The Billboard Book of One-Hit Wonders. According to Darling, "Karl didn't really mesh" and left the group before the remaining trio secured a contract with Glory Records in 1956, where the Tarriers scored two hits.

The Tarriers appeared in a 1957 low-budget musical Calypso Heat Wave, in which they lip-synched to "The Banana Boat Song" and "Choucoune". After completing a European tour in early 1958, Arkin left the group to pursue acting. His replacement was Clarence Cooper, a singer rooted in blues and gospel. In March 1958, Darling was recruited to replace Pete Seeger in The Weavers. Because The Weavers only performed sporadic concerts and recording sessions, Darling continued working with The Tarriers until a November 1959 scheduling conflict forced his departure. His replacement was banjoist/singer Eric Weissberg, later of "Dueling Banjos" fame.

Because of Carey's growing unreliability, Weissberg recruited his college friend Marshall Brickman to join the group. The Tarriers briefly worked as a quartet until late 1963, when Brickman, Cooper and Weissberg reluctantly dismissed Carey for missing shows. Not long thereafter, in January 1964, Carey was interviewed twice on Folk Music Worldwide, an international short-wave radio station in New York City, during which his own music and that of The Tarriers was played.

The Tarriers went on hiatus in 1964 while Cooper recovered from heart surgery and Weissberg honored his National Guard commitments. Brickman joined John Phillips and Michelle Phillips in The New Journeymen. When Cooper and Weissberg re-formed the trio, Al Dana was Brickman's replacement. After his return, the Tarriers re-formed. In 1965, the group accompanied Judy Collins on a tour of Poland and Russia. With the decline in popularity of folk music in the wake of the British Invasion, the Tarriers disbanded.

During their career, the group in its various configurations recorded six albums: one for Glory Records, one for United Artists Records, one for Atlantic Records and three for Decca Records, including The Tarriers at the Bitter End (Decca) and another on which they backed folksinger Oscar Brand, Folk Songs for Fun (Decca, 1962).
