= Arthur "Guitar Boogie" Smith =

American composer, musician, and record producer (1921–2014)

- Born: Arthur Smith; April 1, 1921; Clinton, South Carolina, U.S.
- Origin: South Carolina and Charlotte, North Carolina
- Died: April 3, 2014 (aged 93) Charlotte, North Carolina, U.S.
- Occupations: Composer; musician; record producer
- Instruments: Guitar; banjo; fiddle; mandolin; accordion

Arthur Smith (April 1, 1921 – April 3, 2014) was an American musician, composer, and record producer, as well as a radio and TV host. He produced radio and TV shows; The Arthur Smith Show was the first nationally syndicated country music show on television. After moving to Charlotte, North Carolina, Smith developed and ran the first commercial recording studio in the Southeast.

Born in Clinton, South Carolina, United States, Arthur Smith was a textile mill worker who became a celebrated and respected country music instrumental composer, guitarist, fiddler, and banjo player. One of his early hits was the instrumental "Guitar Boogie", which he wrote and recorded in 1945. It sold over three million copies, and was awarded a gold disc by the RIAA. The song earned him the moniker Arthur "Guitar Boogie" Smith (to differentiate him from Tennessee fiddler and 1930s Grand Ole Opry star Fiddlin' Arthur Smith). It was recorded by numerous other musicians, including Tommy Emmanuel, and became known around the world.

Renamed "Guitar Boogie Shuffle", it became a rock and roll hit by Frank Virtue and the Virtues. Virtue served in the Navy with Smith and counted him as a major influence. Other musicians who have been influenced by Smith include Nashville studio ace Hank "Sugarfoot" Garland, Roy Clark, and Glen Campbell.

Smith was also noted for his "Feudin' Banjos" (1955), which was also recorded by Lester Flatt. It was revived as "Dueling Banjos" and used as a theme song in the film, Deliverance (1972). Released as a single, it became a hit, played on Top 40, AOR, and country stations alike. It reached the Top Ten and hit No. 1 in the US and Canada. Because he was not credited in the film for the song, Smith sued Warner Brothers, and gained a settlement. Smith asked Warner Bros. to include his name on the official soundtrack listing, but reportedly asked to be omitted from the film credits because he found the film offensive.

== Early life ==
Arthur Smith was born in 1921 in Clinton, South Carolina, the son of Clayton Seymour Smith, a cotton mill worker, and his wife. His father was also a music teacher, and led a brass band in Kershaw, South Carolina. The boy's first instrument was the cornet. Arthur, along with his brothers Ralph and Sonny, formed a Dixieland combo, the Carolina Crackerjacks, who appeared briefly on radio in Spartanburg, South Carolina.

They had limited success with their jazz format, and became more popular as a country music group. Arthur Smith moved to Charlotte, North Carolina to join the cast of the WBT Carolina Barndance, a live show and radio program. Before World War II, he was an occasional member of the WBT Briarhoppers band.

== Post-World War II career ==
After wartime service in the US Navy, Smith returned to Charlotte. He was joined in his recording career by his brothers, wife Dorothy and vocalist Roy Lear. He also started his own radio show, Carolina Calling, on WBT. Smith emceed part of the first live television program broadcast in 1951 by the new television station, WBTV, in Charlotte.

His own The Arthur Smith Show was the first country music television show to be syndicated nationally; it ran for 32 years in 90 markets coast to coast. In Charlotte, the show ran on WBTV until April 1, 1971, when it moved to WSOC-TV, with the radio show moving from WBT to WSOC. His band, renamed Arthur Smith & His Crackerjacks, became an institution in the Southeast area through the new medium. They had a daily early-morning variety program, Carolina Calling, which was carried on the CBS-TV network as a summer-replacement during the 1950s. This increased Smith's national visibility. Unusually for a country music band, his band relied on tight arrangements with written "charts" for most of their music.

"He was a good neighbor on radio and TV to so many people," said Tom Hanchett, historian at the Levine Museum of the New South. "He was somebody who came to you every day in your living room or kitchen and felt like a member of the family in a way hard to imagine today. He was from the same mold as Doc Watson and Andy Griffith. He enjoyed the genial tradition of being a Southern gentleman. He relished that."

In 1955, Smith composed a banjo instrumental he called "Feudin' Banjos", and recorded the song with five-string banjo player Don Reno. Later the composition was performed in the popular 1972 film Deliverance, retitled "Dueling Banjos" and played by Eric Weissberg and Steve Mandell. It was released as a single becoming a major hit: played on Top 40, AOR, and country stations alike. It reached the Top Ten in several categories and hit No. 1 on the Cashbox and Record World US pop charts. It was also a No. 1 country hit in the US and Canada. Not credited for this piece in the film, Smith filed a legal suit against Warner Brothers, winning a "substantial settlement;" it included his being awarded songwriting credit and back royalties. This was considered a landmark copyright infringement suit.

As a composer, Smith had nearly 500 copyrights, including over 100 active inspirational and/or gospel music compositions. "The Fourth Man" and "I Saw A Man" were million sellers. In total, his compositions have been recorded numerous times, by artists including Chet Atkins, Glen Campbell, Johnny Cash, the Statesmen Quartet, the Cathedrals, Al Hirt, Barbara Mandrell, Willie Nelson, the Gatlin Brothers, Oak Ridge Boys, Roy Orbison, Tom Petty, Boots Randolph, George Beverly Shea, the Stamps, the Statler Brothers, Ricky Van Shelton and many more. A portion of his Crackerjacks group sang and recorded gospel music under the moniker the Crossroads Quartet. Among the members throughout the years were Smith, Tommy Faile, Ray Atkins, Lois Atkins, brother Ralph Smith, and Wayne Haas.

In Charlotte, Smith founded in 1957 the first commercial recording studio in the Southeast. In addition to recording the Crackerjacks and its various members, he recorded such musicians as vocalist/guitarist/songwriter Tommy Faile, Lester Flatt, Earl Scruggs, Pat Boone, Ronnie Milsap, George Beverly Shea and the Statler Brothers. He also produced sides from many other acts, including rhythm and blues star James Brown, whose "Papa's Got a Brand New Bag" (1965) was cut in Smith's studio. It was later ranked as "No. 72 in Rolling Stone's list of the 500 greatest songs of all time." In this facility, Smith also created and produced nationally syndicated radio programs hosted by Johnny Cash, Chet Atkins, Richard Petty, James Brown, and George Beverly Shea. Billy Graham's Hour of Decision radio program was first produced in Smith's studio. Smith also produced and hosted his own radio program, Top of the Morning, which was syndicated for an unbroken span of 29 years. In the 1970s, Smith produced a weekly, 30-minute videotaped program syndicated in more than 90 TV markets at its peak. He produced radio and television shows for a number of other artists, including Johnny Cash, who had become a friend, and gospel singer George Beverly Shea.

The Crackerjacks band employed a number of noted country musicians at various times, including Don Reno, fiddler Jim Buchanan (later with Jim & Jesse's Virginia Boys, Mel Tillis), banjoists David Deese, Carl Hunt and Jeff Whittington, resonator guitarist Ray Atkins (Johnny & Jack, Carl Story) and country singer George Hamilton IV. Other regular cast members included Wayne Haas, Maggie Griffin, Gerry Dionne, Don Ange, and Jackie Schuler, along with Ralph Smith and Tommy Faile.

As of late 2006, Smith was retired. His extensive publishing interests, production company, and management business are managed by his son, Clay Smith. The younger Smith, a noted recording artist, ran Johnny Cash's businesses in the late 1970s. He returned to his family business with his father in 1982.

His albums include Clay Smith - Smith & Son; Clay Smith & Arthur Smith – Guitars Galore; Clay Smith Decoupage; Clay Smith – Follow the River. Clay Smith is also an award-winning network television producer and record producer.

Arthur and Clay Smith collaborated on 12 major motion picture soundtracks, including Dark Sunday, Death Driver and Living Legend.

== Death ==
Smith died at his home on April 3, 2014, two days after his 93rd birthday. On April 12, 2014, artists, friends and family paid tribute to Smith in a memorial celebration at Calvary Church in Charlotte, North Carolina. Producer Fred Foster gave the eulogy. George Hamilton IV, The Avett Brothers, and others performed several of Smith's popular gospel songs. Dave Moody and David Johnson performed Smith's classic banjo instrumental, "Dueling Banjos". The service ended with a rendition of "Guitar Boogie" performed by a band full of guitarists, including Smith's nephews Tim and Roddy Smith.

== Recognition ==
Awards that Smith received as songwriter and producer:

- BMI Song of the Year Award 1973
- Grammy - Dueling Banjos (1973) (original writer)
- Council on International Nontheatrical Events - Golden Eagle Award (1980)
- The Gold Squirrel Award (Grand Prize – First Prize) Festival International Film & Adventura, Cortina D'Ampezzo, Italy (1981)
- International Real Life Adventure Film Festival, 1st Place Award (1981)
- State of North Carolina Order of The Long Leaf Pine (1984)
- Southeast Tourism Society Award (1985)
- American Advertising Federation Silver Medal Award (1986)
- Broadcast Music Inc. (BMI) Special Citation of Achievement (over 1 million broadcast performances of original compositions)
- The Broadcasters Hall of Fame – North Carolina Association of Broadcasters (1990)
- South Carolina Hall of Fame (1998)
- North Carolina Folk Heritage Award (1998)
- North Carolina Award (2001)
- Legends Award – Western Film Festival (2003)
- Lifetime Achievement Award - South Carolina Broadcasters Association (2006)
- BMI Legendary Songwriter Award (2006)
- North Carolina Music Hall of Fame (2010)

== Discography ==
=== Albums ===
- Specials 1955 (MGM)
- Fingers on Fire 1957 (MGM)
- Arthur Smith and the Crossroads Quartet 1962 (Starday)
- Mister Guitar 1962 (Starday)
- Arthur Smith: In Person 1963 (Starday SLP 241)
- Goes to Town 1963 (Starday)
- Arthur Smith and Voices 1963 (ABC Paramount)
- Old Timers of the Grand Ol' Opry 1964 (MGM)
- Original Guitar Boogie 1964 (Starday)
- Down Home 1964 (Starday)
- The Arthur Smith Show 1964 (Dot)
- Great Country and Western Hits 1965 (Dot)
- Singing on the Mountain 1965 (Dot)
- A Tribute to Jim Reeves 1966 (Dot)
- Guitar Boogie 1968 (MGM)
- The Guitar of Arthur Smith 1968 (Starday)
- Arthur Smith 1970 (Monument)
- Battling Banjos 1973 (Monument)
- The Road That Jesus Walked 1974 (Lamb & Lion)
- Guitars Galore 1975 (Monument)
- Smith & Son 1975 (Monument MC 6643) - with Clay Smith
- Jumpin' Guitar 1985 (MGM)
- Arthur Smith, Vol. 1 (Polydor)
- The Original Dueling Banjos (CBS/Monument)
- Plays Bach, Bacharach, Bluegrass & Boogie (CBS/Monument)

=== Singles ===
Year	Single	Chart Positions		Album
Year	Single	US Country	CAN Country	Album
1948	"Banjo Boogie"	9	—	singles only
1948	"Guitar Boogie"	8	—	singles only
1949	"Boomerang"	8	—	singles only
1950	"Duelin' Banjos"	4	—	singles only
1963	"Tie My Hunting Dog Down, Jed"	29	—	
1973	"Battling Banjos Polka"	—	64	Battling Banjos
