= Yesterday's Tears =

Single by Ernest Tubb
- Released: 1944
- Genre: Country
- Label: Decca
- Songwriter: Ernest Tubb

"Yesterday's Tears" is a country music song written and performed by Ernest Tubb. It was released in 1944 on the Decca label (catalog no. 6098B) with "Soldier's Last Letter" as the "A" side. It peaked at No. 4 on the Billboard country and western chart and remained on the chart for three weeks. It was later re-released with "Mean Mama Blues" as the "A" side.

The song's lyrics refer to a lost love that the singer has tried to forget. His love is such a sorrow, and his heart has been dying since she left. He owes everything to her. So yesterday's tears are still falling.

It was later included on multiple compilation albums, including "Let's Turn Back the Years" (1969), "The Daddy of 'Em All - Ernest Tubb 1940-1952" (1974), "Walking the Fllor Over You" (1996 Bear Family), "Another Story" (1999 Bear Family), "The Definitive Hits Collection" (2001), "The Texas Troubadour" (2005), "The Early Years 1936-1945" (2009), and "The Complete US Hits 1941-62" (2016).
