= Let Me Tell You About a Song =

Studio album by Merle Haggard and the Strangers
- Released: June 1972
- Recorded: August 30, November 8, 18–19, 1971
- Studio: Buck Owens (Bakersfield, California); Capitol (Hollywood)
- Genre: Country
- Label: Capitol ST-882
- Producer: Ken Nelson

Merle Haggard and the Strangers chronology
The Land of Many Churches (1971)	Let Me Tell You About a Song (1972)	It's Not Love (But It's Not Bad) (1972)

Singles from Let Me Tell You About a Song
- 1. "Daddy Frank (The Guitar Man)" Released: September 27, 1971; 2. "Grandma Harp" Released: March 20, 1972

Let Me Tell You About a Song is the fourteenth studio album by American country singer Merle Haggard and the Strangers, released in 1972. It reached No. 7 on the Billboard Country album chart and No. 166 on the Pop album chart. The lead-off singles were "Grandma Harp" and "Daddy Frank (The Guitar Man)" — both reached No. 1.

== Background ==
The album includes Haggard explaining the origins of each song with spoken introductions while praising the talents of those who inspired him, such as Tommy Collins and Bob Wills. Compositionally, the album is split between Haggard originals and cover songs written by Collins, Wills, Red Foley and Joe Simpson, and also contains two #1 country hits, "Daddy Frank (The Guitar Man)" and "Grandma Harp," both penned by Haggard. According to the liner notes to the 1994 box set Down Every Road, "Daddy Frank" derived from stories his wife Bonnie Owens had told him about her own mother, who had a hearing problem, and her father, who wasn't blind but loved to play harmonica. Haggard wed their story to that of the Maddox Brothers and Rose, who had moved from Alabama to California by boxcar during the Depression before forming their famous hillbilly boogie band. The young voices heard on "Daddy Frank" are those of his daughter Dana and of his manager Fuzzy Owen's daughter Cindy.

The album also contains "Irma Jackson," a song Merle describes in his preamble as his favorite "because it tells it like it is" but had remained unreleased because "the time wasn't right." The song tells the story of a doomed interracial romance between a white man and an African-American woman. Haggard had wanted to follow his hit "Okie from Muskogee" with the song but was advised not to by his record label. As Jonathan Bernstein recounts in his online Rolling Stone article "Merle Haggard Reluctantly Unveils 'The Fightin' Side of Me'", "Hoping to distance himself from the harshly right-wing image he had accrued in the wake of the hippie-bashing "Muskogee," Haggard wanted to take a different direction and release "Irma Jackson" as his next single... When the Bakersfield, California native brought the song to his record label, executives were reportedly appalled. In the wake of 'Okie,' Capitol Records was not interested in complicating Haggard's conservative, blue-collar image." After "The Fightin' Side of Me" was released instead, Haggard later commented to the Wall Street Journal, "People are narrow-minded. Down South they might have called me a nigger lover." In an interview with Cantwell in 2001, Haggard stated that his producer Ken Nelson, who was also head of the country division at Capitol at the time, never interfered with his music but "this one time he came out and said, 'Merle...I don't believe the world is ready for this yet'...And he might have been right. I might've canceled out where I was headed in my career."

As Haggard relates in his spoken introduction to the song, "They're Tearin' the Labor Camps Down" is about the disappearance of labor camps like the one he had spent time at in Houston, California when he was a boy. The camps were homes for transplanted "Okies" trying to make a better life for themselves. In the country music documentary Beyond Nashville, Haggard insists that the people in these camps "weren't ignorant, they weren't a lot of things Steinbeck thought they were. My aunt and uncle...lived in a canvass-covered cabin beside the railroad track in Houston, California, and I got to visit them once in a while and really get to know those people and see the impact that the Depression had on them..."

Let Me Tell You About a Song was reissued along with Hag on CD by Beat Goes On Records in 2002.

== Critical reception ==
Professional ratings
Review scores
Source	Rating
AllMusic	4.5/5 stars
Christgau's Record Guide	B+

AllMusic critic Stephen Thomas Erlewine, "It's quite a journey, and it's yet another excellent record from an artist who at this time in his career seemed capable of delivering nothing less." Robert Christgau wrote, "But despite its mawkish moments—especially Tommy Collins's dead-mommy song—the material defines Haggard's sensibility in a winning way, and since not one of the songs is great in itself I guess the commentary must do it."

== Track listing ==
All songs by Merle Haggard unless otherwise noted:

No.	Title	Writer(s)	Length
1.	"Daddy Frank (The Guitar Man)"		3:23
2.	"They're Tearin' the Labor Camps Down"		3:33
3.	"The Man Who Picked the Wildwood Flower"	Tommy Collins	3:26
4.	"Recitation: The Proudest Fiddle in the World (A Maiden's Prayer)"	Bob Wills	2:34
5.	"Bill Woods from Bakersfield"	Joe Simpson	3:15
6.	"Old Doc Brown"	Red Foley	3:26
7.	"Grandma Harp"		3:11
8.	"Turnin' Off a Memory"		2:48
9.	"Irma Jackson"		2:56
10.	"The Funeral"	Collins	3:18
11.	"Bring It On Down to My House, Honey"	Wills	2:49

== Personnel ==
- Merle Haggard – vocals, guitar

The Strangers:

- Roy Nichols – lead guitar
- Norman Hamlet – steel guitar, dobro
- Bobby Wayne – rhythm guitar, harmony vocals
- Dennis Hromek – bass, background vocals
- Biff Adam – drums

with

- Tommy Collins – guitar
- Johnny Gimble – fiddle

and

- Glen D. Hardin – piano
- Billy Liebert – piano

== Charts ==
=== Weekly charts ===
Chart (1972)	Peak position
US Billboard 200	166
US Top Country Albums (Billboard)	7

=== Year-end charts ===
Chart (1972)	Position
US Top Country Albums (Billboard)	11
