= Grandma Harp =

Single by Merle Haggard and The Strangers

from the album Let Me Tell You About a Song
- B-side: "Turning Off a Memory"
- Released: March 20, 1972
- Recorded: November 18, 1971; Hollywood, California
- Genre: Country
- Length: 2:12 (single); 3:10 (album version)
- Label: Capitol 3198
- Songwriter: Merle Haggard
- Producer: Ken Nelson

Merle Haggard and The Strangers singles chronology
"Carolyn" (1971)	"Grandma Harp" / "Turning Off a Memory" (1972)	"It Not Love (But It's Not Bad)" (1972)

"Grandma Harp" is a song written and recorded by American country music artist Merle Haggard and The Strangers. It was released in March 1972 as the second single from the album Let Me Tell You About a Song. The song was Merle Haggard and The Strangers 12th No. 1 on the Billboard Hot Country Singles chart in May 1972, staying atop the chart for two weeks, and spending a total 14 weeks in the top 40.

== Content ==
The song is a reflection of a young man's (Merle Haggard) grandmother, Martha Frances Arizona Belle “Zona” Villines Harp, (aka "Grandma Harp") the family matriarch and title character who was born in Newton County, Arkansas, and lived for 93 years.

The protagonist (who sings the song in first person) says that her life story can be told in only a few short lines, but reflects on how Grandma Harp (along with Grandpa, whom she married in 1901) was a rock that held the family together. The album version includes a spoken word prologue, where Haggard reflects how his grandmother lived through an era of tremendous historical and social change, from the first automobiles to two world wars and the first man to walk on the Moon.

== Chart performance ==
Chart (1972)	Peak position
US Hot Country Songs (Billboard)	1
Canadian RPM Country Tracks	5
