= Daddy Frank (The Guitar Man) =

Single by Merle Haggard and The Strangers

from the album Let Me Tell You About a Song
- B-side: "My Heart Would Know"
- Released: September 27, 1971
- Recorded: August 30, 1971; Buck Owens Studios; Bakersfield, California
- Genre: Country
- Length: 3:10 (single); 3:20 (album version)
- Label: Capitol 3198
- Songwriter(s): Merle Haggard
- Producer(s): Ken Nelson

Merle Haggard and The Strangers singles chronology
"Someday We'll Look Back" (1971)	"Daddy Frank (The Guitar Man)" (1971)	"Carolyn" (1971)

"Daddy Frank (The Guitar Man)" is a song written and recorded by American country music artist Merle Haggard and The Strangers. It was released in September 1971 as the first single from the album Let Me Tell You About a Song. The song was Haggard and the Strangers tenth No. 1 on the Billboard Hot Country Singles. The song topped the chart for two weeks around Thanksgiving 1971, and spent 13 weeks in the chart's Top 40.

== Content ==
The song's main characters are part of a family band:

- Daddy Frank, who was born blind, played the guitar and “French harp” (harmonica).
- Sister, who "played the ringin' tambourine".
- Mama, rendered totally deaf by a fever, had learned to read lips and "helped the fam'ly sing".
- Merle's unnamed character, who narrated the story.

With music as their only means of making an income, the family was essentially homeless, living out of their pick-up truck and camping alongside the highway using the pickup bed as a place to sleep. But Merle recalls that the family never went hungry as Mama would cook on the ground.

The song's values come from how Frank and Mama use their respective handicaps to become strong together. In the song's second verse, Merle says he doesn't know how Frank and Mama met, but he blesses whoever it was that brought the two together.

The album version includes a brief spoken-word introduction hinting at the premise of the song. The introduction is omitted from the 45 RPM single and radio edits.

== Chart performance ==
Chart (1971)	Peak position
US Hot Country Songs (Billboard)	1
Canadian RPM Country Tracks	2
