= I Can't Be Myself =

Single by Merle Haggard and The Strangers

from the album Hag
- Released: October 10, 1970
- Genre: Country
- Length: 2:53
- Label: Capitol
- Songwriter(s): Merle Haggard
- Producer(s): Ken Nelson

Merle Haggard and The Strangers singles chronology
"Jesus, Take a Hold" (1970)	"I Can't Be Myself" (1970)	"Soldier's Last Letter" (1971)

"I Can't Be Myself" is a song written and recorded by American country music artist Merle Haggard and The Strangers. It was released in October 1970 as the second single from the album Hag. The song peaked at number three on the U.S. Billboard Hot Country Singles chart and peaked at number six on the Bubbling Under Hot 100. It reached two on the Canadian RPM Country Tracks.

== Chart performance ==
Chart (1970–1971)	Peak position
US Hot Country Songs (Billboard)	3
US Bubbling Under Hot 100 Singles (Billboard)	6
Canadian RPM Country Tracks	2
