= Someday We'll Look Back (song) =

Single by Merle Haggard and The Strangers

from the album Someday We'll Look Back
- B-side: "It's Great to Be Alive"
- Released: July 3, 1971
- Genre: Country
- Length: 2:28
- Label: Capitol
- Songwriter(s): Merle Haggard
- Producer(s): Ken Nelson

Merle Haggard and The Strangers singles chronology
"Soldier's Last Letter" (1971)	"Someday We'll Look Back" (1971)	"Daddy Frank (The Guitar Man)" (1971)

"Someday We'll Look Back" is a song written and recorded by American country music artist Merle Haggard and The Strangers. It was released in July 1971 as the first single and title track from the album Someday We'll Look Back. The song peaked at number two on the U.S. Billboard Hot Country Singles chart and peaked at number nineteen on the Bubbling Under Hot 100. It reached number two on the Canadian RPM Country Tracks.

== Chart performance ==
Chart (1971)	Peak position
US Hot Country Songs (Billboard)	2
US Bubbling Under Hot 100 Singles (Billboard)	9
Canadian RPM Country Tracks	2
