= Someday We'll Look Back =

Studio album by Merle Haggard and the Strangers
- Released: August 9, 1971
- Recorded: 1969 and 1970
- Studio: Capitol (Hollywood)
- Genre: Country
- Length: 29:38
- Label: Capitol ST-835
- Producer: Ken Nelson

Merle Haggard and the Strangers chronology
Hag (1971)	Someday We'll Look Back (1971)	The Land of Many Churches (1971)

Singles from Someday We'll Look Back
- 1. "Someday We'll Look Back" Released: July 3, 1971; 2. "Carolyn" Released: November 1971

Someday We'll Look Back is the thirteenth studio album by American recording artist Merle Haggard and the Strangers, released in 1971. It reached number 4 on the Billboard country albums chart.

== Recording and composition ==
The album is best remembered for the number-one hit, "Carolyn", written by Haggard's friend and mentor Tommy Collins. Haggard had his doubts that the pop-tinged ballad was right for him, as Collins explains in the liner notes to the 1994 Haggard retrospective Down Every Road, "He said, 'It's just not for me. It's not country enough or something.' And the only time I ever said this to Merle was at this time. I said, 'Would you give it a try?' And (co-producer) Lewis Talley said, 'Hey, you oughta cut that song. That's a hit.'" Haggard also returns to the theme of the plight of the working poor on "One Row at a Time," "California Cotton Fields," and the self-penned "Tulare Dust," a song that led music journalist Daniel Cooper to observe in 1994, "Merle has often driven home the point that life is hard, but he's never driven it with quite so few words as he does in 'Tulare Dust.'" The LP's title track was another Top 5 hit, peaking at number 2.

== Critical reception ==
Professional ratings
Review scores
Source	Rating
AllMusic	5/5 stars
Christgau's Record Guide	B+

AllMusic critic Stephen Thomas Erlewine called the album "a terrific early-'70s LP from Merle Haggard, one that showcases not only his exceptional songwriting skills, but also his rich, subtle eclectism... one of the finest albums he ever recorded." Robert Christgau wrote, "An honest two days' work, but don't let the keynote tune fool you into expecting a lot of class-conscious reminiscences."

== Track listing ==
All songs by Merle Haggard unless otherwise noted.

No.	Title	Writer(s)	Length
1.	"Someday We'll Look Back"		2:31
2.	"Train of Life"	Roger Miller	2:42
3.	"One Sweet Hello"		2:47
4.	"One Row at a Time"	Red Lane, Dottie West	3:06
5.	"Big Time Annie's Square"		2:34
6.	"I'd Rather Be Gone"		2:35
7.	"California Cottonfields"	Dallas Frazier, Earl Montgomery	2:46
8.	"Carolyn"	Tommy Collins	2:33
9.	"Tulare Dust"		1:47
10.	"Huntsville"	Haggard, Red Simpson	3:06
11.	"The Only Trouble with Me"		3:11

== Personnel ==
- Merle Haggard – vocals, guitar

The Strangers:

- Roy Nichols – lead guitar
- Norman Hamlet – steel guitar, dobro
- Bobby Wayne – rhythm guitar, background vocals
- Dennis Hromek – bass, background vocals
- Biff Adam – drums

with

- Lewis Talley – guitar
- Red Lane – guitar
- Tommy Collins – guitar
- George French – piano
- Jerry Ward – bass
- Eddie Burris – drums
- Johnny Gimble – fiddle

and

- James Burton – guitar, dobro
- Glen Campbell – guitar, background vocals
- Glen D. Hardin – piano
- Hargus "Pig" Robbins – piano
- Willard Price – bass
- Leon Copeland – bass
- Chuck Berghofer – bass
- Tommy Ash – drums

== Chart positions ==
Year	Chart	Position
1971	Billboard Country albums	4
1971	Billboard Pop albums	108
