= Hag (album) =

Studio album by Merle Haggard and the Strangers
- Released: April 22, 1971
- Recorded: March, July–September 1970
- Studio: Capitol (Hollywood); RCA Studio A (Nashville)
- Genre: Country
- Length: 26:24
- Label: Capitol ST-735
- Producer: Ken Nelson

Merle Haggard and the Strangers chronology
A Tribute to the Best Damn Fiddle Player in the World (or, My Salute to Bob Wills) (1970)	Hag (1971)	Someday We'll Look Back (1971)

Singles from Hag
- 1. "Jesus, Take a Hold" Released: June 13, 1970; 2. "I Can't Be Myself" Released: October 10, 1970; 3. "Soldier's Last Letter" Released: January 27, 1971

Hag is the twelfth studio album by American country music artist Merle Haggard and the Strangers released on Capitol Records in 1971. It became his fifth album to top the Billboard country album charts. It also reached number 66 on the pop albums chart.

== History ==
Hag was Haggard's first album with a majority of original songs in two years, following two tribute albums (to Jimmie Rodgers and Bob Wills) and two live albums in 1969 and 1970. While Hag spawned no #1 hits, it did include three singles that went to number 3. In his 2013 book The Running Kind, Haggard biographer David Cantwell contends that Hag was "the most sustained and closest-to-coherent political statement of his career...The world Hag portrays on Hag is one teetering on the brink. From atop some middle-American watchtower, Merle delivers a nearly despairing state of the union." The album opens with the Ernest Tubb World War II era-hit "Soldier's Last Letter," a song that took on a new relevance in 1971 with America's continued involvement in the Vietnam War. Haggard addresses social issues plaguing the country at home, such as street violence ("Jesus Take Hold") and homelessness ("Sidewalks of Chicago"). The LP also contains some of Haggard's most delicately sung love songs, such as the melancholy "Shelly's Winter Love" and "The Farmer's Daughter." Haggard would rerecord "No Reason to Quit" for his 1983 duet album Pancho and Lefty with Willie Nelson.

Hag was reissued along with Let Me Tell You About a Song on CD by Beat Goes On Records in 2002.

== Critical reception ==
Professional ratings
Review scores
Source	Rating
AllMusic	5/5 stars
Christgau's Record Guide	C+
Pitchfork Media	8.9/10

In a 1971 review published in the San Bernardino County Sun, Jimmy Johnson wrote that Hag, “hits you right between the eyes with a message in every song,” describing the material as “sometimes painful, sometimes jaunty, sometimes harsh, sometimes caressing, but always intense and direct as the man who sings it.” He added that “If you like Haggard, you’ll like ‘Hag’ because it’s gut country.”

Contemporary reviews of the album have also been positive. Stephen Thomas Erlewine of AllMusic calls it "one of his absolute best albums—which means a lot, because he recorded no shortage of great records. In contrast to the rowdy live albums and the raucous Western swing that preceded it, Hag is quite quiet and reflective, sometimes referencing the turmoil within America at the end of the '60s, but more often finding Haggard turning inward." Robert Christgau wrote, "Four country hits on Haggard's first straight studio album in a year and a half, but only the simple goodbye song 'I Can't Be Myself' escapes bathos."

== Track listing ==
All songs by Merle Haggard unless otherwise noted:

No.	Title	Writer(s)	Length
1.	"Soldier's Last Letter"	Redd Stewart, Ernest Tubb	2:11
2.	"Shelly's Winter Love"		3:22
3.	"Jesus, Take a Hold"		2:16
4.	"I Can't Be Myself"		2:51
5.	"I'm a Good Loser"		2:38
6.	"Sidewalks of Chicago"	Dave Kirby	2:29
7.	"No Reason to Quit"	Dean Holloway	2:35
8.	"If You've Got Time (To Say Goodbye)"		2:52
9.	"The Farmer's Daughter"		2:55
10.	"I've Done It All"		2:15

== Personnel ==
- Merle Haggard – vocals, guitar

The Strangers:

- Roy Nichols – lead guitar
- Norman Hamlet – steel guitar, dobro
- Bobby Wayne – rhythm guitar, harmony vocals
- Dennis Hromek – bass, background vocals
- Biff Adam – drums

with

- Red Lane – guitar
- George French – piano
- Johnny Gimble – fiddle

and

- Earl Ball – piano
- Glen D. Hardin – piano

== Chart positions ==
Year	Chart	Position
1971	Billboard Country albums	1
1971	Billboard Pop albums	66
