= Jesus, Take a Hold =

Single by Merle Haggard and The Strangers

from the album Hag
- B-side: "No Reason to Quit"
- Released: June 13, 1970
- Genre: Country
- Length: 2:18
- Label: Capitol
- Songwriter(s): Merle Haggard
- Producer(s): Ken Nelson

Merle Haggard and The Strangers singles chronology
"Street Singer" (1970)	"Jesus, Take a Hold" (1970)	"I Can't Be Myself" (1970)

"Jesus, Take a Hold" is a song written and recorded by American country music artist Merle Haggard and The Strangers. It was released in June 1970 as the first single from the album Hag. The song peaked at number three on the U.S. Billboard Hot Country Singles chart and peaked at number seven on the Bubbling Under Hot 100. It reached three on the Canadian RPM Country Tracks.

== Personnel ==
- Merle Haggard– vocals, guitar

The Strangers:

- Roy Nichols – lead guitar
- Norman Hamlet – steel guitar, dobro
- Bobby Wayne - rhythm guitar, harmony vocals
- Dennis Hromek – bass, background vocals
- Biff Adam – drums

== Chart performance ==
Chart (1970)	Peak position
US Hot Country Songs (Billboard)	3
US Bubbling Under Hot 100 Singles (Billboard)	7
Canadian RPM Country Tracks	3
