= It's Not Love (But It's Not Bad) (song) =

Single by Merle Haggard and The Strangers

from the album It's Not Love (But It's Not Bad)
- B-side: "My Woman Keeps Lovin' Her Man"
- Released: August 28, 1972
- Genre: Country
- Length: 3:20
- Label: Capitol
- Songwriter(s): Hank Cochran, Glenn Martin
- Producer(s): Ken Nelson; Fuzzy Owen

Merle Haggard and The Strangers singles chronology
| "Grandma Harp" (1972) | "It's Not Love (But It's Not Bad)" (1972) | "I Wonder If They Ever Think of Me" (1972) |

"It's Not Love (But It's Not Bad)" is a song written by Hank Cochran and Glenn Martin, and recorded by American country music artist Merle Haggard and The Strangers. It was released in August 1972 as the first single and title track from the album It's Not Love (But It's Not Bad). The song was Haggard and The Strangers thirteenth number one on the country chart. The single hit number one for one week and spent a total of twelve weeks on the country chart.

== Personnel ==
- Merle Haggard– vocals, guitar

The Strangers:

- Roy Nichols – lead guitar
- Norman Hamlet – steel guitar, dobro
- Bobby Wayne - rhythm guitar, harmony vocals
- Dennis Hromek – bass, background vocals
- Biff Adam – drums

== Chart performance ==
| Chart (1972) | Peak position |
|---|---|
| US Hot Country Songs (Billboard) | 1 |
| Canadian RPM Country Tracks | 1 |
