= 16th Annual Grammy Awards =

1974 US music awards ceremony

- Date: March 2, 1974
- Location: Hollywood Palladium, Los Angeles, California
- Hosted by: Andy Williams
- Most awards: Stevie Wonder (5)
- Most nominations: Stevie Wonder (7)

Television/radio coverage
- Network: CBS

The 16th Annual Grammy Awards were held March 2, 1974, and were broadcast live on American television. They recognised accomplishments by musicians from the year 1973.

== Performers ==
- Gladys Knight & The Pips - "Midnight Train to Georgia"
- Charlie Rich - "Behind Closed Doors"
- Eric Weissberg & Steve Mandell - "Dueling Banjos"
- Al Green - "Call Me (Come Back Home)"
- Little Richard - "Rip It Up"
- Chuck Berry - "Johnny B. Goode"
- Maureen McGovern - "The Morning After"
- Tony Orlando and Dawn - "Tie a Yellow Ribbon Round the Ole Oak Tree"
- Andy Williams - best songs medley
- Cleveland Quartet
- Stevie Wonder - "You Are the Sunshine of My Life"

== Presenters ==
- Shelly Manne & The Jackson 5 - Best R&B Recording by a Duo or Group
- Loretta Lynn & The DeFranco Family - Best Country Vocal Performance, Male
- Loggins & Messina & Glen Campbell - Best Country Instrumental Performance
- Chuck Berry & Little Richard - Best R&B Performance, Male
- Andy Williams - Best Original Score Written for a Motion Picture or a Television Special
- The Carpenters - Best New Artist
- Andy Williams - Tribute to Jim Croce
- Helen Reddy & Alice Cooper - Best Pop Vocal Performance, Male
- Henry Mancini - Presented the Grammy Hall of Fame
- Kris Kristofferson & Moms Mabley - Best Pop Vocal Performance by a Duo or Group
- Roberta Flack - Announced the winners before the telecast
- Andy Williams - Song of the Year
- Isaac Hayes & Lily Tomlin - Best Pop Vocal Performance, Female
- Zubin Mehta - Announced winners in the Classical category
- Cher & Telly Savalas - Album of the Year
- Diana Ross - Record of the Year

== Award winners ==
- Record of the Year
  - Joel Dorn (producer) & Roberta Flack for "Killing Me Softly with His Song"
- Album of the Year
  - Stevie Wonder (producer & artist) for Innervisions
- Song of the Year
  - Charles Fox & Norman Gimbel (songwriters) for "Killing Me Softly with His Song" performed by Roberta Flack
- Best New Artist
  - Bette Midler

=== Children's ===
- Best Recording for Children
  - Joe Raposo (producer) for Sesame Street Live performed by the Sesame Street cast

=== Classical ===
- Best Classical Performance - Orchestra
  - Pierre Boulez (conductor) & the New York Philharmonic for Bartók: Concerto for Orchestra
- Best Classical Vocal Soloist Performance
  - Edward Downes (conductor), Leontyne Price & the New Philharmonia Orchestra for Puccini: Heroines
- Best Opera Recording
  - Tom Mowrey (producer), Leonard Bernstein (conductor), Marilyn Horne, Tom Krause, Adriana Maliponte, James McCracken & the Metropolitan Opera Orchestra & Chorus for Bizet: Carmen
- Best Choral Performance, Classical (other than opera)
  - André Previn (conductor), Arthur Oldham (choirmaster) & the London Symphony Orchestra & Chorus for Walton: Belshazzar's Feast
- Best Classical Performance Instrumental Soloist or Soloists (with orchestra)
  - Georg Solti (conductor), Vladimir Ashkenazy & the Chicago Symphony Orchestra for Beethoven: Concerti (5) for Piano and Orchestra
- Best Classical Performance Instrumental Soloist or Soloists (without orchestra)
  - Vladimir Horowitz for Horowitz Plays Scriabin
- Best Chamber Music Performance
  - Gunther Schuller (conductor) & the New England Ragtime Ensemble for Scott Joplin: The Red Back Book
- Album of the Year, Classical
  - Thomas Z. Shepard (producer), Pierre Boulez (conductor) & the New York Philharmonic for Bartók: Concerto for Orchestra

=== Comedy ===
- Best Comedy Recording
  - Cheech and Chong for Los Cochinos

=== Composing and arranging ===
- Best Instrumental Composition
  - Gato Barbieri (composer) for "Last Tango in Paris" performed by Gato Barbieri
- Album of Best Original Score Written for a Motion Picture or a Television Special
  - Neil Diamond (composer) for Jonathan Livingston Seagull performed by Neil Diamond
- Best Instrumental Arrangement
  - Quincy Jones (arranger) for "Summer in the City" performed by Quincy Jones
- Best Arrangement Accompanying Vocalist(s)
  - George Martin (arranger) for "Live and Let Die" performed by Paul McCartney & Wings

=== Country ===
- Best Country Vocal Performance, Female
  - Olivia Newton-John for "Let Me Be There"
- Best Country Vocal Performance, Male
  - Charlie Rich for "Behind Closed Doors"
- Best Country Vocal Performance by a Duo or Group
  - Rita Coolidge & Kris Kristofferson for "From the Bottle to the Bottom"
- Best Country Instrumental Performance
  - Steve Mandell & Eric Weissberg for "Dueling Banjos"
- Best Country Song
  - Kenny O'Dell (songwriter) for "Behind Closed Doors" performed by Charlie Rich

=== Folk ===
- Best Ethnic or Traditional Recording (including traditional blues)
  - Doc Watson for Then and Now

=== Gospel ===
- Best Gospel Performance
  - Blackwood Brothers for Release Me (From My Sin)
- Best Soul Gospel Performance
  - Dixie Hummingbirds for "Loves Me Like a Rock"
- Best Inspirational Performance
  - The Bill Gaither Trio for Let's Just Praise the Lord

=== Jazz ===
- Best Jazz Performance by a Soloist
  - Art Tatum for God Is in the House
- Best Jazz Performance by a Group
  - Supersax for Supersax Plays Bird
- Best Jazz Performance by a Big Band
  - Woody Herman for Giant Steps

=== Musical show ===
- Best Score From the Original Cast Show Album
  - Stephen Sondheim (composer), Goddard Lieberson (producer) & the original cast (Glynis Johns, Len Cariou, Hermione Gingold, Victoria Mallory, Patricia Elliott & Teri Ralston) for A Little Night Music

=== Packaging and notes ===
- Best Album Package
  - Wilkes & Braun (art director; Tom Wilkes and Craig Braun) for Tommy (1972 orchestral version) performed by the London Symphony Orchestra & Choir
- Best Album Notes
  - Dan Morgenstern (notes writer) for God Is in the House performed by Art Tatum
- Best Album Notes - Classical
  - Glenn Gould (notes writer) for Hindemith: Sonatas for Piano (Complete) performed by Glenn Gould

=== Pop ===
- Best Pop Vocal Performance, Female
  - Roberta Flack for "Killing Me Softly With His Song"
- Best Pop Vocal Performance, Male
  - Stevie Wonder for "You Are the Sunshine of My Life"
- Best Pop Vocal Performance by a Duo, Group or Chorus
  - Gladys Knight & the Pips for "Neither One of Us (Wants to Be the First to Say Goodbye)"
- Best Pop Instrumental Performance
  - Eumir Deodato for "Also Sprach Zarathustra (2001: A Space Odyssey)"

=== Production and engineering ===
- Best Engineered Recording, Non-Classical
  - Malcolm Cecil & Robert Margouleff (engineers) for Innervisions performed by Stevie Wonder
- Best Classical Engineered Recording
  - Edward (Bud) T. Graham, Ray Moore (engineers), Pierre Boulez (conductor) & the New York Philharmonic for Bartók: Concerto for Orchestra

=== R&B ===
- Best R&B Vocal Performance, Female
  - Aretha Franklin for "Master of Eyes"
- Best R&B Vocal Performance, Male
  - Stevie Wonder for "Superstition"
- Best R&B Vocal Performance by a Duo, Group or Chorus
  - Gladys Knight & the Pips for "Midnight Train to Georgia"
- Best R&B Instrumental Performance
  - Ramsey Lewis for "Hang On Sloopy"
- Best Rhythm & Blues Song
  - Stevie Wonder (songwriter) for "Superstition"

=== Spoken ===
- Best Spoken Word Recording
  - Richard Harris for Jonathan Livingston Seagull
