= Billy Redden =

American actor

William Redden (born October 13, 1956) is an American actor. He is best known for his role as a backwoods mountain boy in the 1972 film Deliverance, where he played Lonnie, a banjo-playing teenager in north Georgia, who played the noted "Dueling Banjos" with Drew Ballinger (Ronny Cox).

== Early life ==
Redden was born in Rabun County, Georgia, on October 13, 1956.

== Career ==
At the age of 15, he was discovered by Lynn Stalmaster, who was scouting for the movie Deliverance. Stalmaster recommended Redden to director John Boorman—though Redden was not an albino child, as Boorman had requested—and Redden was cast.

He portrayed a banjo-playing "local" in the film's famous "dueling banjos" scene. Boorman felt that Redden's skinny frame, large head, and almond-shaped eyes made him the natural choice to play the part of an "inbred from the back woods." Because Redden could not play the banjo, he wore a special shirt that allowed a real banjo player to hide behind him. The scene was then shot with carefully chosen camera angles to conceal the player, whose arms were slipped around Redden's waist to play the tune. The hidden banjo player was shown playing in the bare-fingered "clawhammer" style, while the banjo heard on the soundtrack was played in three-finger "Earl Scruggs" style, using finger picks.

After Deliverance, Redden was cast in Lamberto Bava's 1984 film Blastfighter. The film was recorded in and around Clayton, Georgia, and many people recall it as a mixture of Deliverance and First Blood.

Redden next appeared in Tim Burton's 2003 film Big Fish. Burton was intent on getting Redden, as he wanted him to play the role of a banjo-playing "welcomer" in the utopian town of Spectre. Burton located Redden in Clayton, where he was part-owner of the Cookie Jar Café, and also worked as a cook and dishwasher.

In 2004, Redden made a guest appearance on Blue Collar TV, playing a car repairman named Ray in a "Redneck Dictionary" skit. He represented the word "raisin bread" (as in "Ray's inbred"). He played a banjo in the skit.

In 2009, Redden was cast as a banjo player in Ace Cruz's film Outrage: Born in Terror.

In 2012, 40 years after the release of Deliverance, Redden was interviewed in association with a documentary, The Deliverance of Rabun County (2012). It explored the feelings of people in Rabun County four decades later about the 1972 film. Redden said that though Deliverance was the best thing that happened to him, he never saw much money from the movie:

I'd like to have all the money I thought I'd make from this movie. I wouldn't be working at Walmart right now. And I'm struggling really hard to make ends meet.

Noting some locals objected to the stereotypes in the movie, Redden said that the people in Rabun County were good people:

We're not a bad people up here, we're a loving people. Rabun County is a pretty good town. It's peaceful, not a lot of crime going on, just a real peaceful town. Everybody pretty much gets along with everybody.

== Filmography ==
- Deliverance (1972) - Lonnie (Banjo Kid)
- Blastfighter (1984) - Banjo Man (uncredited)
- Big Fish (2003) - Banjo Man
- Outrage (2009) - Banjo Man
