= Carolyn (song) =

Single by Merle Haggard and The Strangers

from the album Someday We'll Look Back
- B-side: "When the Feelin's Gone Away"
- Released: November 1971
- Recorded: April 13, 1971; Hollywood, California
- Genre: Country
- Length: 2:34
- Label: Capitol 3222
- Songwriter(s): Tommy Collins
- Producer(s): Earl Ball

Merle Haggard and The Strangers singles chronology
"Daddy Frank (The Guitar Man)" (1971)	"Carolyn" (1971)	"Grandma Harp" / "Turning Off a Memory" (1972)

"Carolyn" is a song written by Tommy Collins, and recorded by American country music artist Merle Haggard and The Strangers. It was released in November 1971 as the second single from the album Someday We'll Look Back. The song was Haggard and The Strangers eleventh number one on the U.S. country singles chart. The single stayed at number one for three weeks and spent a total of fifteen weeks on the chart.

== Chart performance ==
Chart (1971–1972)	Peak position
US Hot Country Songs (Billboard)	1
US Billboard Hot 100	58
Canadian RPM Country Tracks	2
