= Soldier's Last Letter =

1944 song by Redd Stewart and Ernest Tubb

Soldier's Last Letter is a country music song written by Redd Stewart and Ernest Tubb and recorded by Ernest Tubb. It was released in the United States in 1944 with Yesterday's Tears as the "B" side.

== Background and content ==
In 1941, following the attack on Pearl Harbor, Redd was drafted into the U.S. Army and sent to the South Pacific. While stationed there with the rank of sergeant, Redd wrote "A Soldier's Last Letter”, which Ernest Tubb worked on and recorded in 1944, making it a No.1 hit staying at the top for four weeks out of a seven-month stay on the Country charts, and crossing over to the Pop chart Top 20. The B-side of the Ernest Tubb recording of "Soldier's Last Letter" a song entitled, "Yesterday's Tears" peaked at number four on the Juke Box Folk chart.

Country singer Johnny Wright recorded Soldier's Last Letter for his 1965 album "Hello Vietnam." The song was also recorded by country music artist Hank Snow. Hank was from Nova Scotia, Canada so the last line in the song was changed to "And dear God keep our Canada free..."

== Merle Haggard and The Strangers version ==
"Soldier's Last Letter"

Single by Merle Haggard and The Strangers

from the album Hag
- B-side: "Farmer's Daughter"
- Released: January 27, 1971
- Genre: Country
- Label: Capitol
- Songwriters: Redd Stewart; Ernest Tubb
- Producer: Ken Nelson

Merle Haggard and The Strangers singles chronology
"I Can't Be Myself" (1970)	"Soldier's Last Letter" (1971)	"Someday We'll Look Back" (1971)

Merle Haggard and The Strangers later had a hit single with the song in 1970. Their version reached number three on the U.S. country chart and number four on the Canadian country chart. It also peaked at number ninety on the Hot 100.

=== Chart performance (Merle Haggard) ===
Chart (1971)	Peak position
US Hot Country Songs (Billboard)	3
US Billboard Hot 100	90
Canadian RPM Country Tracks	4
