= It's Not Love (But It's Not Bad) =

Studio album by Merle Haggard and the Strangers
- Released: December 1972
- Recorded: March 1970 – September 1972
- Studio: Capitol (Hollywood); Buck Owens (Bakersfield, California); United Western (Hollywood)
- Genre: Country
- Label: Capitol ST-11127
- Producer: Ken Nelson, Fuzzy Owen

Merle Haggard and the Strangers chronology
Let Me Tell You About a Song (1972)	It's Not Love (But It's Not Bad) (1972)	I Love Dixie Blues (1973)

Singles from It's Not Love (But It's Not Bad)
- 1. "It's Not Love (But it's Not Bad)" Released: August 28, 1972

It's Not Love (But It's Not Bad) is the fifteenth studio album by American country music singer Merle Haggard and the Strangers, released in 1972. It reached number one on the Billboard country albums chart. The lead off single was "It's Not Love (But it's Not Bad)" which also reached No. 1 on the charts.

Haggard's second studio album of 1972 contains several songs that display an ambivalence towards relationships, such as "Somewhere To Come When It Rains," "My Woman Keeps on Loving Her Man," the adulterous "I Wonder Where I'll Find You at Tonight," and the cynical title track. The LP also contains the Haggard original "I Wonder What She'll Think About Me Leaving," which Conway Twitty took to number 4 in 1971.

== Critical reception ==
Professional ratings
Review scores
Source	Rating
AllMusic	2.5/5 stars
Christgau's Record Guide	B

AllMusic's Stephen Thomas Erlewine calls the album a "frustrating listen," and a "fitfully entertaining album, equally divided between the excellent and the mediocre. A few of the throwaways are entertaining, particularly the rolling 'New York City Blues,' but songs like 'Dad's Old Fiddle' and 'My Woman Keeps Lovin' Her Man' fail to make an impression." Robert Christgau wrote, "This mainstream country album—his first since Hag—does more justice to its title than many of his more pretentious efforts. Nothing special, just marriage and its travails, but play it twice and you'll remember most of it."

== Track listing ==
All songs by Merle Haggard unless otherwise noted:

1. "It's Not Love (But it's Not Bad)" (Hank Cochran, Glenn Martin)
2. "Goodbye Comes Hard for Me" (Tommy Collins)
3. "My Woman Keeps Lovin' Her Man"
4. "New York City Blues"
5. "I Wonder What She'll Think About Me Leaving"
6. "The Conversion of Ronnie Jones" (Collins)
7. "A Shoulder to Cry On"
8. "I'd Never Told on You" (Cochran)
9. "Dad's Old Fiddle" (Martin)
10. "Somewhere to Come When It Rains" (Red Lane)
11. "I Wonder Where I'll Find You at Tonight"

== Personnel ==
- Merle Haggard – vocals, guitar

The Strangers:

- Roy Nichols – lead guitar
- Norman Hamlet – steel guitar, dobro
- Bobby Wayne – rhythm guitar, harmony vocals
- Dennis Hromek – bass, background vocals
- Biff Adam – drums

with

- Red Lane – guitar
- Johnny Gimble – fiddle

and

- Ray Edenton – guitar
- Glen D. Hardin – piano
- Hargus "Pig" Robbins – piano
- Billy Liebert – piano
- Bill Woods – fiddle

== Chart positions ==
Year	Chart	Position
1973	Billboard Country albums	1
