= Dueling Banjos (album) =

Soundtrack album by Marshall Brickman, Steve Mandell, and Eric Weissberg
- Released: January 1973
- Recorded: 1962, 1972 ("Dueling Banjos")
- Genre: Bluegrass
- Length: 34:54
- Language: English
- Label: Warner Bros.

Dueling Banjos is a 1973 soundtrack album to the film Deliverance by American banjoists Marshall Brickman, Steve Mandell, and Eric Weissberg released by Warner Bros. Records and made up of the title track by Mandell and Weissberg and a repackaged version of the 1963 album New Dimensions in Banjo and Bluegrass by Brickman and Weissberg.

== Reception ==
Editors at AllMusic rated this album 4 out of 5 stars, with critic Zac Johnson writing that "the blistering virtuosity of multi-instrumentalists Eric Weissberg and Marshall Brickman ripple through such traditional numbers" and that this serves as a good introduction to bluegrass music for listeners.

== Track listing ==
All tracks are traditional compositions, arranged and adapted by Marshall Brickman and Eric Weissberg, except where noted

1. "Dueling Banjos" (arranged by Weissberg) – 3:16
2. "Little Maggie" – 1:12
3. "Shuckin' the Corn" – 2:12
4. "Pony Express" – 2:06
5. "Old Joe Clark" – 1:50
6. "Eight More Miles to Louisville" – 2:03
7. "Farewell Blues" – 2:00
8. "Earl's Breakdown" – 1:52
9. "End of a Dream" (arranged by Weissberg) – 1:49
10. "Buffalo Gals" (written by Brickman) – 2:18
11. "Reuben's Train" – 2:58
12. "Riding the Waves" – 1:35
13. "Fire on the Mountain" – 2:18
14. "Eighth of January" – 1:07
15. "Bugle Call Rag" – 1:32
16. "Hard Ain't It Hard" (written by Woody Guthrie) – 1:50
17. "Mountain Dew" – 1:26
18. "Rawhide" – 2:05

== Personnel ==
- Marshall Brickman – banjo on all tracks except "Dueling Banjos", arrangement
- Steve Mandell – banjo and guitar on "Dueling Banjos"
- Eric Weissberg – banjo, guitar, violin, vocals, arrangement

Additional personnel

- Jimmy Bond – standup bass
- Rick Conrad – proof reading
- Jim Dickson – recording supervision
- Jac Holzman – production supervision
- Dino Lappas – audio engineering
- Clarence White – guitar

== Chart performance ==
Chart performance for Dueling Banjos
Chart	Peak
Australian Albums (Kent Music Report)	61
Billboard 200	1

== See also ==
- List of 1973 albums
- List of Billboard 200 number-one albums of 1973
