= Dueling Banjos =

1954 musical composition by Arthur "Guitar Boogie" Smith

Single by Eric Weissberg

from the album Dueling Banjos
- B-side: "End of a Dream"
- Released: December 1972
- Recorded: 1972
- Genre: Bluegrass
- Length: 2:10
- Label: Warner Bros.
- Songwriters: Arthur "Guitar Boogie" Smith, Don Reno, arranged by Eric Weissberg, Steve Mandell
- Producer: Joe Boyd

Eric Weissberg singles chronology
"Dueling Banjos" (1972)	"Reuben's Train" (1973)

"Dueling Banjos" is a bluegrass composition by American musician Arthur "Guitar Boogie" Smith. The song was composed in 1954 by Smith as a banjo instrumental he called "Feudin' Banjos"; it contained riffs from Smith, recorded in 1955 playing a four-string plectrum banjo and accompanied by five-string bluegrass banjo player Don Reno. The composition's first wide-scale airing was on a 1963 television episode of The Andy Griffith Show called "Briscoe Declares for Aunt Bee", in which it is played by visiting musical family the Darlings (portrayed by The Dillards, a bluegrass group), along with Griffith himself.

The song was made famous by the 1972 film Deliverance, which also led to a successful lawsuit by the song's composer, as it was used in the film without Smith's permission. The film version was arranged and recorded by Eric Weissberg and Steve Mandell, but only credited to Weissberg on a single subsequently issued in December 1972. It went to No. 2 for four weeks on the Billboard Hot 100 in 1973, behind Roberta Flack's "Killing Me Softly with His Song"; it topped the adult contemporary chart for two weeks. It reached No. 1 for one week on both the Cashbox and Record World charts. It reached No. 5 on Hot Country Singles. It peaked at No. 17 in the UK singles chart and spent seven weeks in the Top 40. It was nominated for the 30th Golden Globe Awards as Best Original Song. The success of the single led to an album of the same name released in January 1973.

At the 16th Annual Grammy Awards in 1974, the song won the Grammy for Best Country Instrumental Performance for Steve Mandell & Eric Weissberg.

== Use in Deliverance ==
In Deliverance, a scene depicts Billy Redden playing it opposite Ronny Cox, who joins him on guitar and ends up having a guitar vs. banjo duel. Redden plays Lonnie, a mentally challenged, inbred but extremely gifted banjo player. Redden could not play the banjo and the director thought his hand movements looked unconvincing. A local musician, Mike Addis, was brought in to depict the movement of the boy's left hand. Addis hid behind Redden, with his left arm in Redden's shirt sleeve. Careful camera angles kept Addis out of frame and completed the illusion. The music itself was dubbed from the recording made by Weissberg and Mandell and was not played by the actors. Two young musicians, Ron Brentano and Mike Russo, had originally been signed to play their adaptation for the film, but instead it was performed by Weissberg and Mandell.

"Dueling Banjos" was arranged and performed for the film by Eric Weissberg and Steve Mandell and was included on its soundtrack. When Arthur "Boogie" Smith was not acknowledged as the composer by the filmmakers, he sued and eventually won, receiving songwriting credit as well as royalties.

The song was used in the theatrical trailer of What About Bob? and briefly used in a TV commercial for the 2003 Saturn Vue.

== Charts ==
Chart (1973)	Peak position
Canadian RPM Top Singles	2
Canadian RPM Adult Contemporary Tracks	1
Canadian RPM Country Tracks	9
New Zealand (Listener)	7
South Africa (Springbok)	15
UK Singles (Official Charts Company)	17
US Billboard Hot 100	2
US Billboard Easy Listening	1
US Billboard Hot Country Singles	5

== Certifications ==
Region	Certification	Certified units/sales
United States (RIAA)	Gold	1,000,000^{^}
^{^} Shipments figures based on certification alone.

== Parodies and cover versions ==
Comedian Martin Mull spoofed the song with an instrumental "Dueling Tubas" on his 1973 comedy album Martin Mull & His Fabulous Furniture In Your Living Room.

The Randy Stonehill song "Big Ideas (In a Shrinking World)," from the album Equator, contains a brief joke about "Dueling Bagpipes."

British punk band Toy Dolls adapted the song as "Drooling Banjos" on their 1993 album Absurd-Ditties.

In "Dueling Pizzas", a production video from Season 7, Episode 19 of America's Funniest Home Videos, which first aired in 1996, two people pretend to play the song on cheese pulls from pizza slices. The video won the second place prize, $3,000.

== See also ==
- List of Billboard Easy Listening number ones of 1973
