= Steve Mandell =

American bluegrass guitarist and banjoist (c. 1941–2018)

Stephen Arnold Mandell (c. 1941 – March 14, 2018) was an American bluegrass guitarist and banjoist. Most notably, he is known for the 1973 instrumental hit "Dueling Banjos", recorded in duo with Eric Weissberg and was awarded a Grammy.

== Life and career ==
Mandell was born in Philadelphia, Pennsylvania and grew up in Mount Vernon and New Rochelle, New York. In the early 1960s, along with mandolinist David Grisman, he was part of the Garrett Mountain Boys. In the 1960s and 1970s, Mandell was a prominent session musician, and he played on Judy Collins live album The Judy Collins Concert (1964) and studio album True Stories and Other Dreams (1973), among others.

In 1972, Mandell recorded "Dueling Banjos" with another session musician, Eric Weissberg. In 1973, the single peaked at No. 2 on the Billboard Hot 100, No. 5 on the Billboard Hot Country Singles, and No. 1 on Adult Contemporary chart, and the tune was the theme of the 1972 film Deliverance. The song was also nominated for the 1972 Golden Globe Awards in the Best Original Song category. "Dueling Banjos" won the 1974 Grammy Award for Best Country Instrumental Performance.

In 1973, the album Dueling Banjos by Eric Weissberg and Steve Mandell peaked at No. 1 on the Billboard 200.

Mandell also worked on Broadway, and played in the 1976 musical The Robber Bridegroom. He also recorded advertising jingles.

In 1988, he left New York and moved to Baltimore. He died of prostate cancer on March 14, 2018, at the age of 76. He was an Owings Mills, Maryland resident at the time of his death.
