= Eric Weissberg =

American musician (1939–2020)

- Born: August 16, 1939; New York City, U.S.
- Died: March 22, 2020 (aged 80) White Lake Township, Michigan, U.S.
- Genres: Folk; country; bluegrass
- Instruments: Banjo; steel guitar; guitar; fiddle; mandolin; dobro; bass guitar
- Years active: 1958–2020
- Labels: Elektra; Warner Bros.
- Formerly of: The Tarriers

Eric Weissberg (August 16, 1939 – March 22, 2020) was an American singer, banjo player, and multi-instrumentalist, whose most commercially successful recording was his banjo solo in "Dueling Banjos", featured as the theme of the film Deliverance (1972) and released as a single that reached number 2 in the United States and Canada in 1973.

A member of the folk group the Tarriers for years, Weissberg later developed a career as a session musician. He played and recorded with leading folk, bluegrass, rock, and popular musicians and groups from the middle of the 20th century to its end.

== Life and career ==
Weissberg was born in Brooklyn, New York City, the son of Cecile (Glasberg), a liquor buyer, and Will Weissberg, a publicity photographer. He attended The Little Red Schoolhouse in New York's Greenwich Village and graduated from The High School of Music & Art in New York City. He went on to the University of Wisconsin–Madison and the Juilliard School of Music. From 1956 to 1958, Weissberg frequently joined Bob Yellin, John Herald and Paul Prestopino at Washington Square Park to play on Sundays from 12-6pm. Public folk-singing in that park was forbidden by the city except for Sunday afternoons. John Herald the lead singer played guitar. Bob Yellin played guitar and 5-string. Weissberg usually played 5-string but also fiddle. Paul Prestopino played mandolin. Weissberg joined an early version of the Greenbriar Boys (1958–59), but left before they made any recordings. He joined The Tarriers, replacing Erik Darling. At the time, the Tarriers had had a hit with "Banana Boat Song"; Harry Belafonte's version, released soon afterward, became a bigger hit.

Weissberg was taken on as a string-bass player, but the group soon made use of his multi-instrumental talents as banjo player, fiddler, guitarist, mandolin player, and singer. He started performing with the Tarriers while still a student at Juilliard. His first album with The Tarriers, Tell The World About This (1960), has a much rougher feel than the smoothly produced sound of The Weavers or The Kingston Trio.

In 1964, he had one-year's service with the National Guard, which he had earlier joined. After his return, the Tarriers re-formed. In 1965, the group accompanied Judy Collins on a tour of Poland and Russia, but disbanded soon after. Collins was sufficiently impressed with his musicianship to use Weissberg as a session musician on Fifth Album (1965) and several later albums.

Commercially, interest in acoustic folk groups was waning. Weissberg developed a career as a session musician, playing on albums by The Clancy Brothers, Doc Watson, Melanie, Billy Joel, Barbra Streisand, Frankie Valli, Bob Dylan, Loudon Wainwright III, Talking Heads, Tom Paxton, Jim Croce, Art Garfunkel, John Denver, Ronnie Gilbert, and others.

He was well known for playing the banjo solo in "Dueling Banjos", used as the theme in the film Deliverance (1972), produced by Joe Boyd and directed by John Boorman. It was released later as a single and became a hit, playing on Top 40, AOR, and country stations alike. It reached the Top Ten and hit #2 in the US and Canada. The song also won the 1974 Grammy Award for Best Country Instrumental Performance.

Weissberg released a related album, called Dueling Banjos: From the Original Motion Picture Soundtrack Deliverance (1973), which also became a hit. The album was made up mostly of tracks which Weissberg had recorded on New Dimensions in Banjo and Bluegrass (1963), with Marshall Brickman and Clarence White. (Also a screenwriter, Brickman later received an Oscar for Annie Hall.) They removed two tracks from the 1963 album and added the track for "Dueling Banjos", releasing it under the new name. One of the original 1963 tracks on the new album, "Shuckin' The Corn", was later sampled by Beastie Boys on the track "5-Piece Chicken Dinner" from their album Paul's Boutique.

Warner Brothers was sued by Arthur "Guitar Boogie" Smith, the composer of "Feudin' Banjos", which he had written and recorded in 1955. It was renamed as "Dueling Banjos" in the movie. He won a "substantial settlement," which included appended film credit for the song and a portion of royalties.

Continuing to play folk festivals, Weissberg was nearly as well known in that venue for his dobro guitar as for his bluegrass banjo playing. He also recorded with jazz musicians Herbie Mann and Bob James. In 1998, he joined Richard Thompson and dozens of other folk musicians on Nanci Griffith's album Other Voices, Too.

He often toured with Tom Paxton. They frequently played a variant of "Dueling Banjos" in the set, in addition to Paxton's material.

On February 12, 2009, Weissberg performed at the Riverside Church in New York City with the Aaron Copland School of Music at Queens College orchestra and chorus, along with the Riverside Inspirational Choir and NYC Labor Choir, to honor President Abraham Lincoln's 200th birthday. Directed by Maurice Peress, they performed Earl Robinson's The Lonesome Train: A Music Legend for Actors, Folk Singers, Choirs, and Orchestra, in which Weissberg played solo banjo.

On March 22, 2020, Weissberg died at the age of 80 from Alzheimer's disease at a nursing home in White Lake Township, Michigan, near Detroit.

== Discography ==
=== Albums ===
Year	Album	Chart positions			R.I.A.A.	Label
Year	Album	US Country	US	CAN	R.I.A.A.	Label
1963	New Dimensions in Banjo and Bluegrass	—	—	—	—	Elektra
1973	Dueling Banjos	1	1	1	Gold	Warner Bros.
1973	Rural Free Delivery	—	196	—	—	Warner Bros.
1996	Banjo Jamboree: Tradition Series	—	—	—	—	Rykodisc

=== Singles ===
Year	Single	Chart positions						R.I.A.A.	Album
Year	Single	US AC	US	US Country	CAN AC	CAN	CAN Country	R.I.A.A.	Album
1973	"Dueling Banjos" (with Steve Mandell)	1	2	5	1	2	9	Gold	Dueling Banjos
1973	"Reuben's Train"	—	—	—	69	—	71	—	Dueling Banjos
1975	"Yakety Yak" (with Deliverance)	—	—	91	—	—	—	—	single only

=== Partial list of sessions recordings ===
- The Boys Won't Leave the Girls Alone (The Clancy Brothers and Tommy Makem, 1962)
- "Sunny's Gallery of Folk Songs" (Sunny Schwartz, 1963)
- Fifth Album (Judy Collins, 1965)
- Live At Newport (1959–1966) (Judy Collins)
- Ballads From Deep Gap (Doc and Merle Watson, 1967)
- Bombs Over Puerto Rico (Jim & Ingrid Croce, 1969)
- Sweet Moments With The Blue Velvet Band, Warner Bros. Seven Arts Records WS 1802 (1969 - As member of The Blue Velvet Band, with Bill Keith, Richard Greene, Jim Rooney)
- The Good Book (Melanie, 1971)
- Barbra Joan Streisand (Barbra Streisand, 1971)
- Lay It All Out (Barry Mann, 1971)
- Aerie (John Denver, 1971)
- Stoney End (Barbra Streisand, 1971)
- Poems, Prayers & Promises (John Denver, 1971)
- Rocky Mountain High (John Denver, 1972)
- Careful Man (Jim Croce 1973)
- Portfolio (Richie Havens, 1973)
- True Stories and Other Dreams (Judy Collins, 1973)
- Farewell Andromeda (John Denver, 1973)
- Piano Man (Billy Joel, 1973)
- Back Home Again (John Denver, 1974)
- Blood on the Tracks (Bob Dylan, 1974)
- Clear Waters Remembered (Jean Ritchie, 1974)
- Judith (Judy Collins, 1975)
- Free Beer (Free Beer, 1975)
- Closeup (Frankie Valli, 1975)
- Songs for the New Depression (Bette Midler, 1976)
- Sing Children Sing: Songs of the United States of America (UNICEF, 1977)
- Two Days Away (Elkie Brooks, 1977)
- Say It in Private (Steve Goodman, 1977)
- Final Exam (Loudon Wainwright III, 1978)
- Return of the Wanderer (Dion DiMucci, 1978)
- None But One (Jean Ritchie, 1981)
- Chaka Khan (Chaka Khan, 1982)
- Cabbage Patch Dreams (Cabbage Patch Kids, 1984)
- Little Creatures (Talking Heads, 1985)
- The Animals' Christmas (Art Garfunkel, Amy Grant, 1986)
- The Wanderer (Kevin Rowland, 1988)
- Family Vacation (Rosenshontz, 1988)
- Rei Momo (David Byrne, 1989)
- Album III (Loudon Wainwright III, 1990)
- Heroes (Tom Paxton, 1992)
- Judy Sings Dylan ... Just Like a Woman (Judy Collins, 1993)
- Shameless (Judy Collins, 1994)
- Take The Fifth (compilation; Bridget St John, 1995)
- Join the Jubilee (Tom Chapin and others, 1996)
- Songs from a Parent to a Child (Art Garfunkel, 1997)
- Other Voices, Too (Nanci Griffith, 1998)
- Bathhouse Betty (Bette Midler, 1998)
- Live For The Record (Tom Paxton, 1999)
- Times Like These (Rick Danko, 2000)
- Cowboy Dreams (Prefab Sprout, 2001)
- The Girls Won't Leave the Boys Alone (Cherish the Ladies, 2001)
- Live at Wolf Trap (Judy Collins, 2002)
- Copper: Original Soundtrack (Brian Keane, 2013)
- North Mountain Rambling (David Kraai, 2017)
