= Deliverance =

1972 film by John Boorman

- Theatrical release poster by Bill Gold
- Directed by: John Boorman
- Screenplay by: James Dickey
- Based on: Deliverance (1970 novel) by James Dickey
- Produced by: John Boorman
- Starring: Jon Voight; Burt Reynolds; Ned Beatty; Ronny Cox
- Cinematography: Vilmos Zsigmond
- Edited by: Tom Priestley
- Music by: Eric Weissberg
- Production company: Elmer Enterprises
- Distributed by: Warner Bros.
- Release date: July 30, 1972
- Running time: 109 minutes
- Country: United States
- Language: English
- Budget: $2 million
- Box office: $46.1 million

Deliverance is a 1972 American thriller film directed and produced by John Boorman from a screenplay by James Dickey, who adapted it from his 1970 novel. It follows four businessmen from Atlanta who venture into the remote northern Georgia wilderness to go whitewater canoeing down the Cahulawassee River before it is dammed, only to find themselves in danger from the area's inhabitants and nature. It stars Jon Voight, Burt Reynolds, Ned Beatty, and Ronny Cox, with the latter two making their feature film debuts.

Deliverance was a critical and commercial success. It earned three Academy Award nominations and five Golden Globe Award nominations, and grossed $46.1 million on a budget of $2 million. It became a popular culture landmark for a scene featuring Cox's character playing "Dueling Banjos" on guitar with a banjo-picking country boy, and garnered notoriety for a scene in which Beatty's character is brutally raped by a mountain man. In 2008, it was selected for preservation in the United States National Film Registry by the Library of Congress as being "culturally, historically, or aesthetically significant".

In retrospective analysis, the film has since garnered criticism from journalists, historians, and citizens of Rabun County, Georgia, where the film was shot, for its portrayal of the people and culture of Appalachia, its promotion of Appalachian stereotypes in film and television, and has even been labeled as an anti-working class and an anti-rural film.

== Plot ==
Four Atlanta businessmen decide to go whitewater canoeing down the Cahulawassee River in the remote northern Georgia wilderness before it becomes dammed. Lewis Medlock is an avid outdoorsman and survivalist who leads the group, and Ed Gentry has been on several trips, but lacks Lewis's self-confidence, while Bobby Trippe and Drew Ballinger are novices.

En route to their launch site, the men, in particular Bobby, are rude toward the locals, who in turn become hostile to the "city boys". At a local gas station, Drew engages a young banjo-playing boy in a musical duel with his guitar. The duel is mutually enjoyable, and some of the locals break into dance at the sound of it. However, the boy does not acknowledge Drew when offered a friendly handshake.

The four friends travel down the river in two canoes, which briefly become separated. Ed and Bobby encounter a pair of mountain men emerging from the woods, one carrying a shotgun and missing his two front teeth. Following a disagreement, the men force Bobby to undress and the unarmed man rapes him, demanding that he "squeal like a pig".

Ed tries to help, despite being tied to a tree, and held at gunpoint. After raping Bobby, one of the mountain men begins to threaten Ed, claiming "he had a purty mouth". Before the mountain man can force himself on Ed, Lewis sneaks up and kills the rapist with his bow and arrow while Ed snatches the shotgun from the other mountain man, who flees into the woods. After a heated debate between Lewis and Drew, Ed and Bobby side with Lewis' plan to bury the body and continue on as if nothing had happened. The four continue downriver, but the canoes reach a dangerous stretch of rapids. As Drew and Ed reach the rapids in the lead canoe, Drew falls into the water without his life jacket.

The canoes collide on the rocks, throwing the three remaining men into the river and smashing one of the canoes. Lewis breaks his thigh bone and the other two are washed ashore alongside him in a gorge. Lewis, who believes Drew fell out of the boat because he was shot, encourages Ed to climb to the top of the gorge and ambush the other mountain man, who they believe is stalking them from above. Ed reaches an overhang and hides out until morning. He wakes up and sees a distant shotgun-wielding man resembling one of the rapists. Ed nocks his arrow and draws, but begins to shake with panic. The man then spots him, aims his weapon and they both fire at the same time. Ed falls back and impales himself on one of his other arrows. He pulls out the arrow as the man approaches and then draws his knife as the man nears and aims his weapon at him for the killing shot. The man falls forward, firing his weapon into the ground, having been hit by Ed's initial shot and collapses on the rocks. Ed confirms the man is dead and panics slightly that he may have killed an innocent hunter but checks his teeth and finds the man is wearing dentures and is, indeed, the man from the earlier encounter. Ed throws the man's weapon and his bow off the cliff and down into the river below. Bobby sees the items splashing into the river and looks up wondering what has happened. Ed ties a rope around the man and anchors the end of the rope to a tree to begin lowering the man down the cliff face until he runs out of rope, leaving the man suspended some distance down the cliff. Ed then begins to abseil down the rope but it frays on the cliff edge, ultimately breaking and he and the corpse fall entangled into the river below; Ed is unharmed and Bobby reels him in. They then inspect the body and confirm it is the toothless man from before. Ed and Bobby weigh down the body in the river to ensure it will never be found once the river is dammed, then do the same to Drew's broken body when they encounter it downriver. The three men carefully fabricate a cover story for local authorities to explain Drew's death.

Finally reaching the small town of Aintry, a critically injured Lewis is taken by ambulance to the hospital. Ed and Bobby lie about their adventure to Sheriff Bullard in order to escape a possible triple murder charge. Their cover up is almost blown when Ed thinks he has overheard Bobby secretly telling the sheriff the truth, but Bobby convinces him otherwise. Ed and Bobby visit Lewis in the hospital, where the doctor is contemplating amputating his broken leg. While being closely observed by a police officer, a worried Ed whispers to Lewis that they need to change their cover story. A coy Lewis relaxes him by pretending that the head trauma has wiped his memory clear of everything after the canoe collision. Sheriff Bullard does not believe the men and reveals that Deputy Queen is suspicious of them because his brother-in-law went hunting a few days earlier and has not yet returned. However, with no evidence to hold them, he lets them leave, warning them never to return. The three men part, vowing to keep their story of death and survival a secret for the rest of their lives.

Ed reunites with his wife and son, but remains traumatized, having a nightmare about a bloated hand rising from the lake.

== Cast ==
- Jon Voight as Ed Gentry
- Burt Reynolds as Lewis Medlock
- Ned Beatty as Bobby Trippe
- Ronny Cox as Drew Ballinger
- Bill McKinney as Mountain Man
- Herbert "Cowboy" Coward as Toothless Man
- James Dickey as Sheriff Bullard
- Billy Redden as Lonnie, the banjo boy
- Macon McCalman as Deputy Queen, whose brother-in-law is missing

Beatty's wife Belinda and Boorman's son Charley briefly appear as the wife and son of Voight's character in the final scene.

== Production ==
=== Casting ===
Casting was by Lynn Stalmaster. Dickey had initially wanted Sam Peckinpah to direct the film, but Warner Bros. was not so keen on Peckinpah; so they settled on John Boorman to direct. Dickey also wanted Gene Hackman to portray Ed Gentry, whereas Boorman wanted Lee Marvin to play the role. Boorman also wanted Marlon Brando to play Lewis Medlock, who turned it down because he believed he couldn't fit into the canoes. Jack Nicholson was considered for the role of Ed, while both Donald Sutherland and Charlton Heston turned down the role of Lewis. Other actors who were considered for the film included Robert Redford, Henry Fonda, George C. Scott and Warren Beatty. Boorman denied that Fonda was considered for a role in the film.

=== Filming ===
Deliverance was shot primarily in Rabun County in northeastern Georgia. The canoe scenes were filmed in the Tallulah Gorge southeast of Clayton on the Chattooga River, which divides the northeastern corner of Georgia from the northwestern corner of South Carolina. Additional scenes were shot in Salem, South Carolina. Filming took place from May to August 1971.

A scene was also shot at the Mount Carmel Baptist Church cemetery. This site has since been flooded and lies 130 feet (40 m) under the surface of Lake Jocassee, on the border between Oconee and Pickens counties in South Carolina. The dam shown under construction is Jocassee Dam near Salem, South Carolina.

During the filming of the canoe scene, author James Dickey showed up inebriated and entered into a bitter argument with producer-director John Boorman, who had rewritten Dickey's script. They allegedly had a brief fistfight in which Boorman, a much smaller man than Dickey, suffered a broken nose and four shattered teeth. Dickey was thrown off the set, but no charges were filed against him. The two reconciled and became good friends, and Boorman gave Dickey a cameo role as the sheriff at the end of the film.

The inspiration for the Cahulawassee River was the Coosawattee River, which was dammed in the 1970s and contained several dangerous whitewater rapids before being flooded by Carters Lake.

=== Stunts ===
The studio cut the film's budget after becoming concerned about its content, and the actors performed their own stunts, such as Jon Voight climbing the cliff himself. Reynolds requested to have one scene re-shot with himself in a canoe rather than a dummy as it tumbled over a real waterfall. Reynolds recalled his shoulder and head hitting rocks and floating downstream with all of his clothes torn off, then waking up with director Boorman at his bedside. Reynolds asked "How'd it look?" and Boorman said, "It looked like a dummy falling over a waterfall." Beatty almost drowned and Reynolds cracked his tailbone.

Regarding the courage of the four main actors in the movie performing their own stunts without insurance protection, Dickey said that all of them "had more guts than a burglar". In a nod to their stunt-performing audacity, early in the movie Lewis says, "Insurance? I've never been insured in my life. I don't believe in insurance. There's no risk".

=== "Squeal like a pig" ===
Several people have been credited with the phrase "squeal like a pig", spoken during the graphic rape scene. Ned Beatty said he thought of it while he and actor Bill McKinney (who played Beatty's rapist) were improvising the scene. James Dickey's son, Christopher Dickey, wrote in his memoir about the film production, Summer of Deliverance, that because Boorman had rewritten so much dialogue for the scene, one of the crewmen suggested that Beatty's character should just "squeal like a pig". Boorman, in a DVD commentary he made for the film, said the line was used because the studio wanted the male rape scene to be filmed in two ways: one for cinematic release, and one that would be acceptable for television. As Boorman did not want to do that, he decided that the phrase "squeal like a pig", suggested by Rabun County liaison Frank Rickman, was a good replacement for the original dialogue in the script. Reynolds later recalled the scene as so uncomfortable cameramen avoided watching, and he opted to interrupt the filming. He said, "I asked John Boorman, the director, 'Why did you let it go that long?' He said, 'I wanted to take it as far as I could with the audience, and I figured you'd run in when it got too far.'"

== Soundtrack ==
The film's soundtrack brought new attention to the musical work "Dueling Banjos", which had been recorded numerous times since 1955. Only Eric Weissberg and Steve Mandel were originally credited for the piece. The onscreen credits state that the song is an arrangement of the song "Feudin' Banjos", showing Combine Music Corp as the copyright owner. Songwriter and producer Arthur "Guitar Boogie" Smith, who had written "Feudin' Banjos" in 1955, and recorded it with five-string banjo player Don Reno, filed a lawsuit for songwriting credit and a percentage of royalties. He was awarded both in a landmark copyright infringement case. Smith asked Warner Bros. to include his name on the official soundtrack listing, but reportedly asked to be omitted from the film credits because he found the film offensive.

Joe Boyd, who was producing the music for the movie, offered "Duelling Banjos" to Bill Keith, who turned it down and suggested Eric Weissberg instead.

No credit was given for the film score. The film has a number of sparse, brooding passages of music scattered throughout, including several played on a synthesizer. Some prints of the movie omit much of this extra music.

Boorman was given a gold record for the "Dueling Banjos" hit single; this was later stolen from his house by the Dublin gangster Martin Cahill. Boorman recreated this scene in The General (1998), his biographical film about Cahill.

=== Charts ===
Chart performance for Deliverance soundtrack
Chart (1973)	Position
Australian Albums (Kent Music Report)	61
US Record World Album Chart	1

== Reception ==
=== Commercial ===
Deliverance was a box office success in the United States, becoming the fourth-highest grossing film of 1972, with a domestic take of over $46 million. The film's financial success continued the following year, when it went on to earn $18 million in North American "distributor rentals" (receipts).

=== Critical ===
Deliverance received generally positive reviews by critics, and is widely regarded as one of the best films of 1972.

Contemporary critic Gene Siskel of the Chicago Tribune gave the film four stars out of four and wrote, "It is a gripping horror story that at times may force you to look away from the screen, but it is so beautifully filmed that your eyes will eagerly return." Charles Champlin of the Los Angeles Times called it "an engrossing adventure, a demonstrable labor of love" carried by Voight and Reynolds. Gary Arnold of The Washington Post wrote that the film was "certainly a distinctive and gripping piece of work, with a deliberately brooding, ominous tone and visual style that put you in a grave, fearful frame of mind, almost in spite of yourself."

Not all reviews were positive. Roger Ebert of the Chicago Sun-Times gave the film a mixed 2.5 stars out of a possible 4. He declared the film was "admittedly effective on the level of simple adventure" and had good performances, particularly from Voight and Reynolds. However, Ebert also wrote Deliverance "totally fails [in] its attempt to make some kind of significant statement about its action [...] It's possible to consider civilized men in a confrontation with the wilderness without throwing in rapes, cowboy-and-Indian stunts and pure exploitative sensationalism."

Arthur D. Murphy of Variety wrote that the setting was "majestic" but it was "in the fleshing out that the script fumbles, and with it the direction and acting."

Vincent Canby of The New York Times was also generally negative, calling the film "a disappointment" because "so many of Dickey's lumpy narrative ideas remain in his screenplay that John Boorman's screen version becomes a lot less interesting than it has any right to be."

Pauline Kael writing for The New Yorker was critical of the film and wrote that the movie demonstrated that it could be effective "even if you are always aware of the actors' acting and don't really believe in a single character."

On review aggregation website Rotten Tomatoes, the film holds a 90% rating based on reviews from 68 critics, with an average rating of 8.40/10. The site's consensus states: "Given primal verve by John Boorman's unflinching direction and Burt Reynolds' star-making performance, Deliverance is a terrifying adventure." Metacritic, which uses a weighted average, assigned the film a score of 80 out of 100, based on 15 critics, indicating "generally favorable" reviews.

== Legacy ==
Following the film's release, Georgia Governor Jimmy Carter established a state film commission to encourage television and movie production there. By 2012 the state had "become one of the top five production destinations in the U.S". Tourism increased to Rabun County by the tens of thousands after the film's release. By 2012, tourism was the largest source of revenue in the county, and rafting had developed as a $20 million industry in the region. Jon Voight's stunt double for this film, Claude Terry, later purchased equipment used in the movie from Warner Brothers. He founded a whitewater rafting adventure company on the Chattooga River, Southeastern Expeditions. Payson Kennedy, the stunt double for Ned Beatty, established the Nantahala Outdoor Center with his wife and Horace Holden along the Nantahala River in Swain County, North Carolina, in 1972, the same year that Deliverance was released.

"Dueling Banjos" won the 1974 Grammy Award for Best Country Instrumental Performance. The film was selected by The New York Times as one of The Best 1,000 Movies Ever Made, while the viewers of Channel 4 in the United Kingdom voted it #45 on a list of The 100 Greatest Films. Reynolds later called it "the best film I've ever been in". However, he stated that the rape scene went "too far".

Filmmaker Bong Joon Ho has cited Deliverance as one of his top four favorite films.

In 2025, The Hollywood Reporter listed Deliverance as having the best stunts of 1972.

The "Where you goin', city boy?" line at the beginning of the film is sampled in Primus's 1993 single "My Name Is Mud". The "Now let's you just drop them pants" line and adjacent dialogue from the same scene of the film is sampled in the "Drop Yer Britches" mix of Revolting Cocks single "Beers, Steers, and Queers".

=== Awards and nominations ===
Award	Category	Recipient	Result	Ref.
Academy Awards	Best Picture	John Boorman	Nominated	
Academy Awards	Best Director	John Boorman	Nominated	
Academy Awards	Best Film Editing	Tom Priestley	Nominated	
British Academy Film Awards	Best Cinematography	Vilmos Zsigmond	Nominated	
British Academy Film Awards	Best Film Editing	Tom Priestley	Nominated	
British Academy Film Awards	Best Soundtrack	Jim Atkinson, Walter Goss, and Doug Turner	Nominated	
Directors Guild of America Awards	Outstanding Directorial Achievement in Motion Pictures	John Boorman	Nominated	
Golden Globe Awards	Best Motion Picture – Drama		Nominated	
Golden Globe Awards	Best Actor in a Motion Picture – Drama	Jon Voight	Nominated	
Golden Globe Awards	Best Director – Motion Picture	John Boorman	Nominated	
Golden Globe Awards	Best Screenplay – Motion Picture	James Dickey	Nominated	
Golden Globe Awards	Best Original Song – Motion Picture	"Dueling Banjos"; Music by Arthur Smith; Adaptation by Eric Weissberg	Nominated	
National Board of Review Awards	Top Ten Films		7th Place	
National Film Preservation Board	National Film Registry		Inducted	
Turkish Film Critics Association Awards	Best Foreign Film		9th Place	
Writers Guild of America Awards	Best Drama – Adapted from Another Medium	James Dickey	Nominated	

==== American Film Institute lists ====
- AFI's 100 Years...100 Thrills—#15

== See also ==
- List of American films of 1972
- List of cult films
- Survival film, about the film genre, with a list of related films
