= 1974 in country music =

This is a list of notable events in country music that took place in the year 1974.

== Events ==
- March 16 — The Grand Ole Opry moves from the Ryman Auditorium, its home of the past 41 years, to the newly constructed 4,400-seat Grand Ole Opry House, on the Opryland complex. President Richard Nixon is a guest at the Ryman's last show. The Ryman would essentially sit vacant for the next two decades before being renovated in the early 1990s as a historical landmark and concert hall.
- July 17 — Don Rich, a key member of Buck Owens' backing band, The Buckaroos, is killed in a motorcycle crash on State Route 99 north of Bakersfield, California; he was 32. Owens is deeply saddened by Rich's death, and it will gravely affect his career for many years.
- October 17 — The pilot episode of Austin City Limits, featuring Willie Nelson, is recorded, and will air during PBS' 1975 pledge drive.

=== No dates ===
- Country purists, long troubled by a growing trend of pop music-influenced country, form the Association of Country Entertainers, as a result of the outcry over the 1974 Country Music Association awards program, where pop diva Olivia Newton-John won Female Vocalist of the Year, and Danny Davis & the Nashville Brass was awarded another Instrumental Group of the Year.
- The proliferation of No. 1 hits, as certified by Billboard, extends into 1974, when 40 songs reach the top of the Hot Country Singles chart. In fact, just nine songs – 10, counting Merle Haggard's "If We Make It Through December", which spent two of its four weeks at No. 1 in January – remain at the top spot for more than one week.
- Dolly Parton leaves Porter Wagoner's band and his weekly television show, after seven years, to embark on a solo career.
- Loretta Lynn releases "The Pill", a sexually frank song about birth control. The song is deemed controversial and some country stations refuse to play it.

== Top hits of the year ==
=== Number-one hits ===
==== United States ====
(as certified by Billboard)

Date	Single Name	Artist	Wks. No.1	CAN peak	Spec. Note
January 19	I Love	Tom T. Hall	2
February 2	Jolene	Dolly Parton	1
February 9	World of Make Believe	Bill Anderson	1
February 16	That's the Way Love Goes	Johnny Rodriguez	1	2
February 23	Another Lonely Song	Tammy Wynette	2
March 9	There Won't Be Anymore	Charlie Rich	2		^{[1]}
March 23	There's a Honky Tonk Angel (Who'll Take Me Back In)	Conway Twitty	1
March 30	Would You Lay with Me (In a Field of Stone)	Tanya Tucker	1	7
April 6	A Very Special Love Song	Charlie Rich	3
April 27	Hello Love	Hank Snow	1		^{[B]}
May 4	Things Aren't Funny Anymore	Merle Haggard	1	2
May 11	Is It Wrong (For Loving You)	Sonny James	1	75	^{[B]}
May 18	Country Bumpkin	Cal Smith	1	2
May 25	No Charge	Melba Montgomery	1		^{[C]}
June 1	Pure Love	Ronnie Milsap	1	2	^{[A]} Written by Eddie Rabbitt.
June 8	I Will Always Love You	Dolly Parton	1	4
June 15	I Don't See Me in Your Eyes Anymore	Charlie Rich	1	7
June 22	This Time	Waylon Jennings	1		^{[A]}
June 29	Room Full of Roses	Mickey Gilley	1	6	^{[A]}
July 6	He Thinks I Still Care	Anne Murray	2	11	^{[A]}
July 20	Marie Laveau	Bobby Bare	1		^{[C]}
July 27	You Can't Be a Beacon If Your Light Don't Shine	Donna Fargo	1
August 3	Rub It In	Billy "Crash" Craddock	2		^{[A]}
August 17	As Soon as I Hang Up the Phone	Conway Twitty and Loretta Lynn	1
August 24	Old Man from the Mountain	Merle Haggard	1
August 31	The Grand Tour	George Jones	1	2
September 7	Please Don't Tell Me How the Story Ends	Ronnie Milsap	2
September 21	I Wouldn't Want to Live If You Didn't Love Me	Don Williams	1	10	^{[A]}
September 28	I'm a Ramblin' Man	Waylon Jennings	1	2
October 5	I Love My Friend	Charlie Rich	1
October 12	Please Don't Stop Loving Me	Porter Wagoner and Dolly Parton	1	45	^{[B] – Porter Wagoner}
October 19	I See the Want To in Your Eyes	Conway Twitty	2
November 2	I Overlooked an Orchid	Mickey Gilley	1	15
November 9	Love Is Like a Butterfly	Dolly Parton	1	2
November 16	Country Is	Tom T. Hall	1
November 23	Trouble in Paradise	Loretta Lynn	1	14
November 30	Back Home Again	John Denver	1		^{[A]}
December 7	She Called Me Baby	Charlie Rich	1
December 14	I Can Help	Billy Swan	2		^{[C]}
December 28	What a Man My Man Is	Lynn Anderson	1		^{[B]}

Notes

- 1 No. 1 song of the year, as determined by Billboard.
- A First Billboard No. 1 hit for that artist.
- B Last Billboard No. 1 hit for that artist.
- C Only Billboard No. 1 hit for that artist to date.

==== Canada ====
(as certified by RPM)

Date	Single Name	Artist	Wks. No.1	U.S. peak	Spec. Note
January 12	Amazing Love	Charley Pride	1
January 19	If We Make It Through December	Merle Haggard	1
January 26	I Love	Tom T. Hall	2
February 9	Hey Loretta	Loretta Lynn	1	3
February 16	Jolene	Dolly Parton	1		^{[A]}
February 23	World of Make Believe	Bill Anderson	1
March 2	A Love Song	Anne Murray	2	5
March 16	There Won't Be Anymore	Charlie Rich	1
March 23	Another Lonely Song	Tammy Wynette	1
March 30	There's a Honky Tonk Angel (Who'll Take Me Back In)	Conway Twitty	1
April 6	Sweet Magnolia Blossom	Billy "Crash" Craddock	1	3
April 13	A Very Special Love Song	Charlie Rich	3		RPM didn't publish on May 4.
May 11	Hello Love	Hank Snow	2		^{[B]}
May 25	No Charge	Melba Montgomery	1		^{[C]}
June 1	Honeymoon Feelin'	Roy Clark	1	4	^{[B]}
June 8	The Streak	Ray Stevens	1	3	^{[C]}
June 15	If You Love Me (Let Me Know)	Olivia Newton-John	2	2	^{[A]}
June 29	When the Morning Comes	Hoyt Axton	1	10	^{[C]}
July 6	We Could	Charley Pride	1	3
July 13	This Time	Waylon Jennings	1
July 20	I'm Not Through Loving You Yet	Conway Twitty	1	3
July 27	They Don't Make 'em Like My Daddy	Loretta Lynn	1	4
August 3	Marie Laveau	Bobby Bare	1		^{[C]}
August 10	As Soon as I Hang Up the Phone	Conway Twitty and Loretta Lynn	1
August 17	Rub It In	Billy "Crash" Craddock	1
August 24	You Can't Be a Beacon If Your Light Don't Shine	Donna Fargo	1
August 31	Old Man from the Mountain	Merle Haggard	1
September 7	Talkin' to the Wall	Lynn Anderson	2	7
September 21	Dance with Me (Just One More Time)	Johnny Rodriguez	1	2
September 28	Please Don't Tell Me How the Story Ends	Ronnie Milsap	1		^{[A]}
October 5	I Love My Friend	Charlie Rich	2
October 19	Bonaparte's Retreat	Glen Campbell	1	3
October 26	I See the Want To in Your Eyes	Conway Twitty	1
November 2	Woman to Woman	Tammy Wynette	1	4
November 9	Mississippi Cotton Picking Delta Town	Charley Pride	1	3
November 16	I Honestly Love You	Olivia Newton-John	2	6
November 30	Carefree Highway	Gordon Lightfoot	1	81
December 7	Country Is	Tom T. Hall	1		^{[B]}
December 14	I Can Help	Billy Swan	1		^{[C]}
December 21	Back Home Again	John Denver	1		^{[A]}
December 28	She Called Me Baby	Charlie Rich	1

Notes

- A First RPM No. 1 hit for that artist.
- B Last RPM No. 1 hit for that artist.
- C Only RPM No. 1 hit for that artist.

=== Other major hits ===
==== Singles released by American artists ====
US	CAN	Single	Artist
17	—	After the Fire Is Gone	Willie Nelson and Tracy Nelson
10	12	Ain't Love a Good Thing	Connie Smith
19	37	Angels Are Hard to Find	Hank Williams, Jr.
9	3	Annie's Song	John Denver
13	24	At the Time	Jean Shepard
13	57	Atta Way to Go	Don Williams
51	15	Back in the Country	Roy Acuff
6	2	Baby Doll	Barbara Fairchild
14	21	The Baptism of Jesse Taylor	Johnny Russell
11	15	Between Lust and Watching TV	Cal Smith
22	17	Biff, the Friendly Purple Bear	Dick Feller
4	2	Big Four Poster Bed	Brenda Lee
8	7	Big Game Hunter	Buck Owens
17	26	Bloody Mary Morning	Willie Nelson
8	8	Boney Fingers	Hoyt Axton and Renee Armand
9	14	Bring Back Your Love to Me	Don Gibson
24	2	Can I Come Home to You	Bill Anderson
9	13	Can You Feel It	David Houston
19	—	Come on In and Let Me Love You	Lois Johnson
10	38	Credit Card Song	Dick Feller
13	17	The Crude Oil Blues	Jerry Reed
2	5	Daddy, What If	Bobby Bare and Bobby Bare, Jr.
14	15	Delta Dirt	Larry Gatlin
11	17	Don't Let Go	Mel Tillis and Sherry Bryce
10	47	Don't Tell (That Sweet Ole Lady of Mine)	Johnny Carver
12	13	Don't You Think	Marty Robbins
10	—	Drinkin' Thing	Gary Stewart
7	5	Every Time I Turn the Radio On	Bill Anderson
23	16	A Field of Yellow Daisies	Charlie Rich
3	6	Get on My Love Train	LaCosta
12	17	A Good Woman's Love	Jerry Reed
19	—	Goodbye	Rex Allen, Jr.
12	8	The Great Divide	Roy Clark
18	44	Guess Who	Jerry Wallace
2	—	Hang in There Girl	Freddie Hart
26	13	He Can Be Mine	Jeannie Seely
8	4	He Can't Fill My Shoes	Jerry Lee Lewis
6	4	Help Me	Elvis Presley
17	23	Here We Go Again	Brian Shaw
15	34	Highway Headin' South	Porter Wagoner
20	35	Houston (I'm Comin' to See You)	Glen Campbell
11	7	How Lucky Can One Man Be	Joe Stampley
17	—	I Just Started Hatin' Cheatin' Songs Today	Moe Bandy
6	18	I Love You, I Love You	David Houston and Barbara Mandrell
13	—	I Never Knew (What That Song Meant Before)	Connie Smith
19	23	I Wish That I Had Loved You Better	Eddy Arnold
19	43	I'd Fight the World	Jim Reeves
17	—	I'll Do Anything It Takes (To Stay with You)	Jean Shepard
7	2	I'll Think of Something	Hank Williams, Jr.
6	—	I'll Try a Little Bit Harder	Donna Fargo
11	40	I'm Having Your Baby	Sunday Sharpe
17	7	I'm Leaving It Up to You	Donny and Marie Osmond
3	2	I'm Still Loving You	Joe Stampley
4	96	I've Got a Thing About You Baby	Elvis Presley
11	11	I've Just Got to Know (How Loving You Would Be)	Freddy Weller
8	2	If I Miss You Again Tonight	Tommy Overstreet
16	—	It'll Come Back	Red Sovine
6	9	(It's A) Monster's Holiday	Buck Owens
10	—	It's That Time of Night	Jim Ed Brown
13	77	It's Time to Cross That Bridge	Jack Greene
3	3	(Jeannie Marie) You Were a Lady	Tommy Overstreet
8	—	Last Time I Saw Him	Dottie West
13	12	Lean It All on Me	Diana Trask
15	—	Like a First Time Thing	Ray Price
11	7	Lovin' on Borrowed Time	Mel Street
9	—	Loving You Has Changed My Life	David Rogers
11	17	Lucky Ladies	Jeannie Seely
11	38	Makin' the Best of a Bad Situation	Dick Feller
4	10	The Man That Turned My Mama On	Tanya Tucker
3	3	Memory Maker	Mel Tillis
4	3	A Mi Esposa Con Amor (To My Wife with Love)	Sonny James
2	2	Midnight Me and the Blues	Mel Tillis
64	16	My Girl Bill	Jim Stafford
19	37	My Part of Forever	Johnny Paycheck
9	3	My Wife's House	Jerry Wallace
19	12	Old Home Filler-Up an' Keep On-a-Truckin' Cafe	C. W. McCall
8	4	The Older the Violin, The Sweeter the Music	Hank Thompson
9	13	On the Cover of the Music City News	Buck Owens
3	65	Once You've Had the Best	George Jones
8	30	One Day at a Time	Don Gibson
19	—	One Day at a Time	Marilyn Sellars
16	22	The Rainbow in Daddy's Eyes	Sammi Smith
13	21	Rainy Night in Georgia	Hank Williams, Jr.
21	19	Red Rose from the Blue Side of Town	George Morgan
13	9	The River's Too Wide	Jim Mundy
17	33	Rosie Cries a Lot	Ferlin Husky
51	11	Sally G	Paul McCartney
20	20	Silver Threads and Golden Needles	Linda Ronstadt
15	10	Smile for Me	Lynn Anderson
12	23	Snap Your Fingers	Don Gibson
8	6	Some Kind of a Woman	Faron Young
6	11	Something	Johnny Rodriguez
10	7	Sometime Sunshine	Jim Ed Brown
2	5	Somewhere Between Love and Tomorrow	Roy Clark
8	9	Song and Dance Man	Johnny Paycheck
17	—	Standing in Your Line	Barbara Fairchild
10	6	Statue of a Fool	Brian Collins
7	29	Still Loving You	Bob Luman
3	4	Stomp Them Grapes	Mel Tillis
40	11	Stop and Smell the Roses	Mac Davis
18	30	Stop the World (And Let Me Off)	Susan Raye
5	9	Take Me Home to Somewhere	Joe Stampley
18	8	Tell Tale Signs	Jerry Lee Lewis
14	9	Ten Commandments of Love	David Houston and Barbara Mandrell
11	14	That Girl Who Waits on Tables	Ronnie Milsap
2	2	That Song Is Driving Me Crazy	Tom T. Hall
12	—	This Time I Almost Made It	Barbara Mandrell
12	19	Tonight Someone's Falling in Love	Johnny Carver
10	9	Twentieth Century Drifter	Marty Robbins
25	16	The Uptown Poker Club	Jerry Reed
14	—	Wake Me Into Love	Bud Logan and Wilma Burgess
3	3	The Want-To's	Freddie Hart
8	—	We Loved It Away	George Jones and Tammy Wynette
5	—	We Should Be Together	Don Williams
15	16	(We're Not) The Jet Set	George Jones and Tammy Wynette
16	26	When I Get My Hands on You	Diana Trask
14	14	When Your Good Love Was Mine	Narvel Felts
10	12	Who Left the Door to Heaven Open	Hank Thompson
27	18	Workin' at the Car Wash Blues	Tony Booth
6	5	Wrong Ideas	Brenda Lee
20	22	The Wrong in Loving You	Faron Young
15	34	You Don't Need to Move a Mountain	Jeanne Pruett
15	—	You Make Me Feel More Like a Man	Mel Street
16	20	You're Not Getting Older (You're Getting Better)	Freddy Weller

==== Singles released by Canadian artists ====
US	CAN	Single	Artist
—	4	Anna Marie	Bruce Miller
—	11	Ballad of the Hotel Waitress	Roy MacCaull
—	20	The Balladeer	Jim and Don Haggart
—	10	The Battle of New Orleans	Mike Graham
—	2	Bitter Sweet Songs	Dick Damron
—	2	Bittersweet	Donna Moon
—	19	Blues Comin' Round	Marg Osburne
—	14	Cardboard Cowboys	Bob Ruzicka
—	9	Eastbound Highway	Orval Prophet
—	19	Ghost Story	Mike Graham
—	8	Great Canadian Tour	Ian Tyson
—	18	Happy Anniversary	Con Archer
—	13	He	Jim and Don Haggart
91	18	The Hill	Ray Griff
—	15	His Kind of Woman	Dianne Leigh
—	12	House of Glass	Allan Capson
—	17	I Love Your Kind of Lovin'	Lynn Jones
—	10	I'd Go Through It All Again	Carroll Baker
—	4	Kids in the Kitchen	Family Brown
—	16	Little Boy Blue	Carroll Baker
—	14	Love Is Simple	Family Brown
—	3	Momma Brown	R. Harlan Smith
—	6	Our Loving Times	Mercey Brothers
—	19	Our Summer Song	Tommy Ambrose
—	15	Shoeshine Workin' Song	Murray McLauchlan
—	11	Sing-a-Long with Me	Linda Brown
5	3	Son of a Rotten Gambler	Anne Murray
—	14	Standing on the Promises	Newman Sisters
13	4	Sundown	Gordon Lightfoot
—	11	Sweet Jesus	Roy Payne
—	3	Ten Little Fingers	Carroll Baker
65	12	That Doesn't Mean (I Don't Love My God)	Ray Griff
36	5	That's You and Me	Hank Snow
—	15	What Used to Be a River	Jim and Don Haggart
—	10	Whisper to Me Tina	Roy Payne
—	13	A Window Mannikin	Jo-Anne
—	16	You Do It Again	Sharon Lowness

== Top new album releases ==
Album	Artist	Record Label
Breakaway	Kris Kristofferson and Rita Coolidge	Monument
Elvis: A Legendary Performer Volume 1	Elvis Presley	RCA
Elvis: As Recorded Live On Stage In Memphis	Elvis Presley	RCA
Good Times	Elvis Presley	RCA
The Grand Tour	George Jones	Epic
Having Fun with Elvis on Stage	Elvis Presley	RCA
If You Love Me, Let Me Know	Olivia Newton-John	MCA
Jolene	Dolly Parton	RCA
Junkie and the Juicehead Minus Me	Johnny Cash	Columbia
Long Live Love	Olivia Newton-John	EMI
Phases and Stages	Willie Nelson	Atlantic
Ragged Old Flag	Johnny Cash	Columbia
Spooky Lady's Sideshow	Kris Kristofferson	Monument
Sundown	Gordon Lightfoot	Reprise
This Time	Waylon Jennings	RCA
Would You Lay with Me (In a Field of Stone)	Tanya Tucker	Columbia

=== Other top albums ===
Album	Artist	Record Label
Another Lovely Song	Tammy Wynette	Epic
Back Home Again	John Denver	RCA
Honky Tonk Amnesia	Moe Bandy	GRT
Honky Tonk Angel	Conway Twitty	MCA
House of the Rising Sun	Jody Miller	Epic
Houston (I'm Coming to See You)	Glen Campbell	Capitol
I-40 Country	Jerry Lee Lewis	Mercury
I'll Do Anything It Takes	Jean Shepard	United Artists
If We Make It Through December	Merle Haggard	Capitol
I'm Not Through Loving You Yet	Conway Twitty	MCA
Jeanne Pruett	Jeanne Pruett	MCA
Lean It All on Me	Diana Trask	Dot
The Midnight Oil	Barbara Mandrell	Columbia
My Third Album	Johnny Rodriguez	Mercury
Never Ending Song of Love	Conway Twitty	MCA
No Charge	Melba Montgomery	Elektra
Pure Love	Ronnie Milsap	RCA
Reunion: The Songs of Jimmy Webb	Glen Campbell	Capitol
Rub It In	Billy "Crash" Craddock	ABC
Songs About Ladies and Love	Johnny Rodriguez	Mercury
"Whispering" Bill Anderson	Bill Anderson	MCA
Woman to Woman	Tammy Wynette	Epic

== Births ==
- January 7 — John Rich, singer-songwriter and member of Big & Rich.
- February 17 – Chuck Dauphin, American sports radio broadcaster and country music journalist (died 2019).
- February 17 — Bryan White, singer-songwriter from the 1990s.
- March 18 – Phillip Sweet, member of Little Big Town.
- May 23 – Jewel, multi-genre singer-songwriter who released the country album Perfectly Clear in 2008.
- June 6 – Uncle Kracker, rock singer who has had major country successes with "When the Sun Goes Down" (duet with Kenny Chesney) and "Smile."
- September 12 — Jennifer Nettles, lead singer of Sugarland.
- October 14 — Natalie Maines, lead singer of the Dixie Chicks.
- November 21 — Kelsi Osborn, member of SHeDAISY.

== Deaths ==
- January 2 — Tex Ritter, 68, silver screen cowboy and western artist (heart attack).
- April 26 – Tim Spencer, 65, member of the Sons of the Pioneers.
- July 17 — Don Rich, 32, right-hand man of Buck Owens and key member of the Buckaroos (motorcycle crash).

== Country Music Hall of Fame Inductees ==
- Owen Bradley (1915–1998)
- Pee Wee King (1914–2000)

== Major awards ==
=== Grammy Awards ===
- Best Female Country Vocal Performance — "A Love Song", Anne Murray
- Best Male Country Vocal Performance — "Please Don't Tell Me How the Story Ends", Ronnie Milsap
- Best Country Performance by a Duo or Group with Vocal — "Fairytale", The Pointer Sisters
- Best Country Instrumental Performance — The Atkins - Travis Traveling Show, Chet Atkins and Merle Travis
- Best Country Song — "A Very Special Love Song", Billy Sherrill and Norro Wilson (Performer: Charlie Rich)

=== Juno Awards ===
- Country Male Vocalist of the Year — Stompin' Tom Connors
- Country Female Vocalist of the Year — Shirley Eikhard
- Country Group or Duo of the Year — Mercey Brothers

=== Academy of Country Music ===
- Entertainer of the Year — Mac Davis
- Song of the Year — "Country Bumpkin", Don Wayne (Performer: Cal Smith)
- Single of the Year — "Country Bumpkin", Cal Smith
- Album of the Year — Back Home Again, John Denver
- Top Male Vocalist — Merle Haggard
- Top Female Vocalist — Loretta Lynn
- Top Vocal Duo — Conway Twitty and Loretta Lynn
- Top New Male Vocalist — Mickey Gilley
- Top New Female Vocalist — Linda Ronstadt

=== Country Music Association ===
- Entertainer of the Year — Charlie Rich
- Song of the Year — "Country Bumpkin", Don Wayne (Performer: Cal Smith)
- Single of the Year — "Country Bumpkin", Cal Smith
- Album of the Year — A Very Special Love Song, Charlie Rich
- Male Vocalist of the Year — Ronnie Milsap
- Female Vocalist of the Year — Olivia Newton-John
- Vocal Duo of the Year — Conway Twitty and Loretta Lynn
- Vocal Group of the Year — The Statler Brothers
- Instrumentalist of the Year — Don Rich
- Instrumental Group of the Year — Danny Davis and the Nashville Brass

== Other links ==
- Country Music Association
- Inductees of the Country Music Hall of Fame
