= List of RPM number-one country singles of 1974 =

These are the Canadian number-one country songs of 1974, per the RPM Country Tracks chart.

Issue date	Title	Artist
January 12	Amazing Love	Charley Pride
January 19	If We Make It Through December	Merle Haggard
January 26	I Love	Tom T. Hall
February 2	I Love	Tom T. Hall
February 9	Hey Loretta	Loretta Lynn
February 16	Jolene	Dolly Parton
February 23	World of Make Believe	Bill Anderson
March 2	A Love Song	Anne Murray
March 9	A Love Song	Anne Murray
March 16	There Won't Be Anymore	Charlie Rich
March 23	Another Lonely Song	Tammy Wynette
March 30	There's a Honky Tonk Angel (Who'll Take Me Back In)	Conway Twitty
April 6	Sweet Magnolia Blossom	Billy "Crash" Craddock
April 13	A Very Special Love Song	Charlie Rich
April 20	A Very Special Love Song	Charlie Rich
April 27	A Very Special Love Song	Charlie Rich
May 11	Hello Love	Hank Snow
May 18	Hello Love	Hank Snow
May 25	No Charge	Melba Montgomery
June 1	Honeymoon Feelin'	Roy Clark
June 8	The Streak	Ray Stevens
June 15	If You Love Me (Let Me Know)	Olivia Newton-John
June 22	If You Love Me (Let Me Know)	Olivia Newton-John
June 29	When the Morning Comes	Hoyt Axton
July 6	We Could	Charley Pride
July 13	This Time	Waylon Jennings
July 20	I'm Not Through Loving You Yet	Conway Twitty
July 27	They Don't Make 'em Like My Daddy	Loretta Lynn
August 3	Marie Laveau	Bobby Bare
August 10	As Soon as I Hang Up the Phone	Conway Twitty and Loretta Lynn
August 17	Rub It In	Billy "Crash" Craddock
August 24	You Can't Be a Beacon If Your Light Don't Shine	Donna Fargo
August 31	Old Man from the Mountain	Merle Haggard
September 7	Talkin' to the Wall	Lynn Anderson
September 14	Talkin' to the Wall	Lynn Anderson
September 21	Dance with Me (Just One More Time)	Johnny Rodriguez
September 28	Please Don't Tell Me How the Story Ends	Ronnie Milsap
October 5	I Love My Friend	Charlie Rich
October 12	I Love My Friend	Charlie Rich
October 19	Bonaparte's Retreat	Glen Campbell
October 26	I See the Want To in Your Eyes	Conway Twitty
November 2	Woman to Woman	Tammy Wynette
November 9	Mississippi Cotton Picking Delta Town	Charley Pride
November 16	I Honestly Love You	Olivia Newton-John
November 23	I Honestly Love You	Olivia Newton-John
November 30	Carefree Highway	Gordon Lightfoot
December 7	Country Is	Tom T. Hall
December 14	I Can Help	Billy Swan
December 21	Back Home Again	John Denver
December 28	She Called Me Baby	Charlie Rich

== See also ==
- 1974 in music
- List of number-one country singles of 1974 (U.S.)
