= List of Hot Country Singles number ones of 1974 =

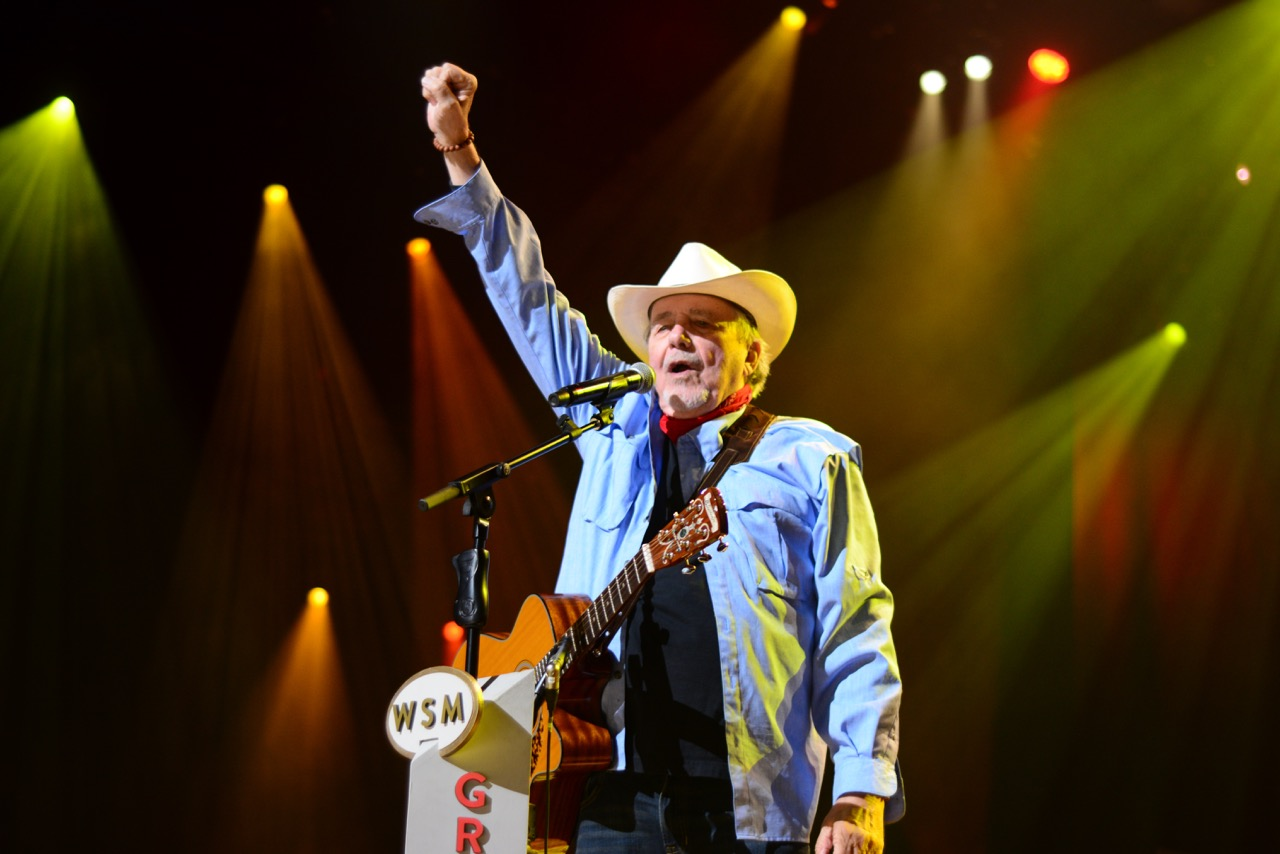
Bobby Bare had his only number one single in 1974.

Hot Country Songs is a chart that ranks the top-performing country music songs in the United States, published by Billboard magazine. In 1974, 41 different singles topped the chart, which at the time was published under the title Hot Country Singles, in 52 issues of the magazine, based on playlists submitted by country music radio stations and sales reports submitted by stores.

At the start of the year, the number one song on the chart was "If We Make It Through December" by Merle Haggard, the song's third week in the top spot. Charlie Rich had the most number ones of 1974, taking five different songs to the top spot, followed by Dolly Parton, who had three solo chart-toppers and one in collaboration with her long-time mentor Porter Wagoner. Wagoner and Parton had charted with a number of duets since 1967, but "Please Don't Stop Loving Me" was their only number one as a duo. In 1973, Parton had taken the decision to end her working relationship with Wagoner, which served as the inspiration for the song "I Will Always Love You", one of her three solo number ones of 1974. In 1982 she re-recorded the song and it once again went to number one, making her the first artist to top the country chart with two different recordings of the same song. Wagoner and Parton's chart-topper was one of two male-female duets to reach number one in 1974, the other being Conway Twitty and Loretta Lynn's "As Soon as I Hang Up the Phone". Twitty and Lynn had a run of success with duet recordings in the early 1970s alongside their ongoing solo careers.

In addition to having the most individual chart-toppers, Charlie Rich also spent the highest total number of weeks at number one during the year. The singer nicknamed the "Silver Fox" spent eight weeks in the top spot with "There Won't Be Anymore", "A Very Special Love Song", "I Don't See Me in Your Eyes Anymore", "I Love My Friend" and "She Called Me Baby", all of which also crossed over to Billboard's pop singles chart, the Hot 100; no other artist spent more than four weeks atop the country listing. Three of the five – "There Won't Be Anymore," "I Don't See Me In Your Eyes Anymore" and "She Called Me Baby" – were recorded in the mid-1960s and re-released by his old labels to cash in on his recent success. A fifteen-year veteran of the music industry, Rich had finally achieved stardom in both the country and pop markets in the early 1970s and was at the peak of his success in 1974, but changing musical tastes and increasing personal problems led to him largely retiring at the end of the decade. In June, Ronnie Milsap had his first number one with "Pure Love". He would go on to become one of the most successful country performers of the 1970s and 1980s, topping the Hot Country Singles chart more than 30 times. In the same month, Waylon Jennings reached number one for the first time with "This Time". Jennings would go on to become one of the mainstays of the successful outlaw country movement of the late 1970s and, like Milsap, is a member of the Country Music Hall of Fame. A third future Hall of Fame inductee to top the chart for the first time in 1974 was Bobby Bare, who achieved the only number one of his lengthy career in July with "Marie Laveau". Mickey Gilley, Billy Swan, Melba Montgomery and Billy "Crash" Craddock were also first-time chart-toppers in 1974. The final number one of the year was "What a Man My Man Is" by Lynn Anderson.

== Chart history ==
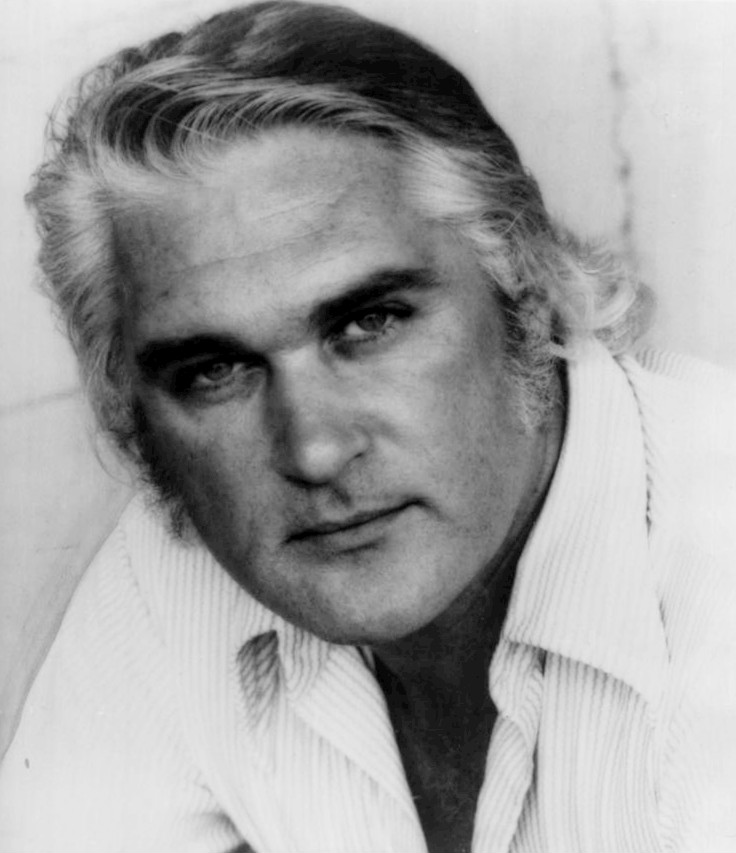
Charlie Rich had five number ones in 1974.

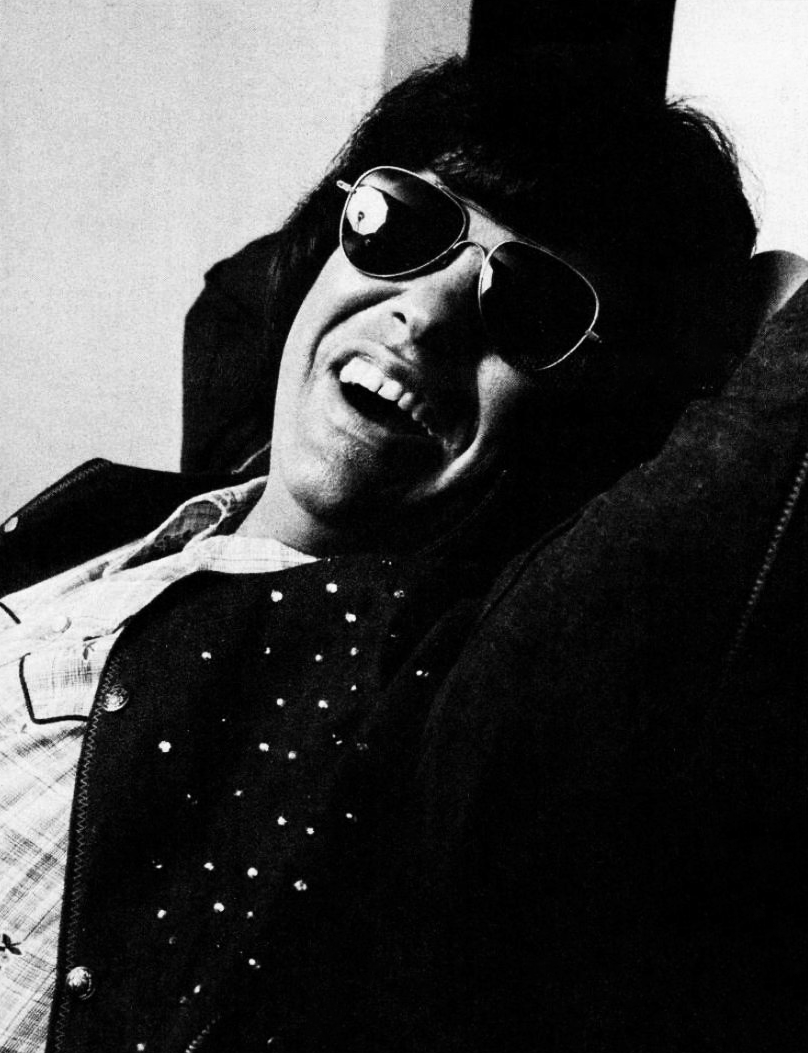
Ronnie Milsap had the first of more than 30 country number ones.

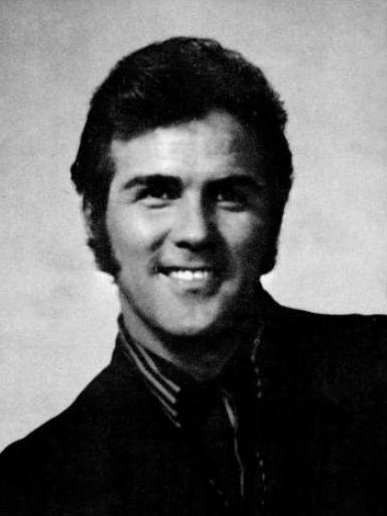
Billy "Crash" Craddock had one of the few chart-toppers to spend more than a single week at number one.

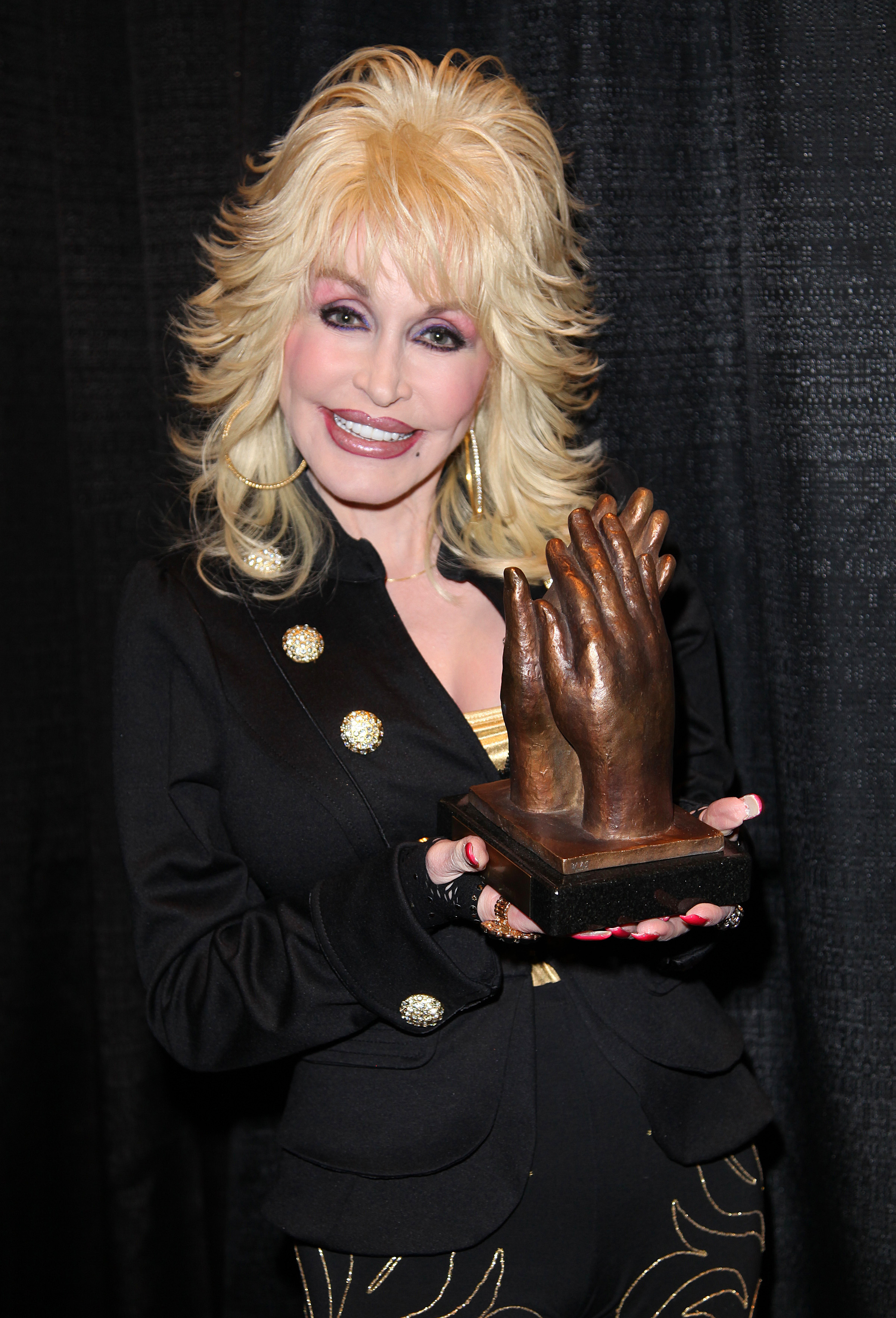
Dolly Parton had four number ones, including one of her best-known songs, "I Will Always Love You".

Issue date	Title	Artist(s)	Ref.
January 5	"If We Make It Through December"	Merle Haggard	
January 12	"If We Make It Through December"	Merle Haggard	
January 19	"I Love"	Tom T. Hall	
January 26	"I Love"	Tom T. Hall	
February 2	"Jolene"	Dolly Parton	
February 9	"World of Make Believe"	Bill Anderson	
February 16	"That's the Way Love Goes"	Johnny Rodriguez	
February 23	"Another Lonely Song"	Tammy Wynette	
March 2	"Another Lonely Song"	Tammy Wynette	
March 9	"There Won't Be Anymore"	Charlie Rich	
March 16	"There Won't Be Anymore"	Charlie Rich	
March 23	"There's a Honky Tonk Angel (Who'll Take Me Back In)"	Conway Twitty	
March 30	"Would You Lay with Me (In a Field of Stone)"	Tanya Tucker	
April 6	"A Very Special Love Song"	Charlie Rich	
April 13	"A Very Special Love Song"	Charlie Rich	
April 20	"A Very Special Love Song"	Charlie Rich	
April 27	"Hello Love"	Hank Snow	
May 4	"Things Aren't Funny Anymore"	Merle Haggard	
May 11	"Is It Wrong (For Loving You)"	Sonny James	
May 18	"Country Bumpkin"	Cal Smith	
May 25	"No Charge"	Melba Montgomery	
June 1	"Pure Love"	Ronnie Milsap	
June 8	"I Will Always Love You"	Dolly Parton	
June 15	"I Don't See Me in Your Eyes Anymore"	Charlie Rich	
June 22	"This Time"	Waylon Jennings	
June 29	"Room Full of Roses"	Mickey Gilley	
July 6	"He Thinks I Still Care"	Anne Murray	
July 13	"He Thinks I Still Care"	Anne Murray	
July 20	"Marie Laveau"	Bobby Bare	
July 27	"You Can't Be a Beacon If Your Light Don't Shine"	Donna Fargo	
August 3	"Rub It In"	Billy "Crash" Craddock	
August 10	"Rub It In"	Billy "Crash" Craddock	
August 17	"As Soon as I Hang Up the Phone"	Conway Twitty and Loretta Lynn	
August 24	"Old Man from the Mountain"	Merle Haggard	
August 31	"The Grand Tour"	George Jones	
September 7	"Please Don't Tell Me How the Story Ends"	Ronnie Milsap	
September 14	"Please Don't Tell Me How the Story Ends"	Ronnie Milsap	
September 21	"I Wouldn't Want to Live If You Didn't Love Me"	Don Williams	
September 28	"I'm a Ramblin' Man"	Waylon Jennings	
October 5	"I Love My Friend"	Charlie Rich	
October 12	"Please Don't Stop Loving Me"	Porter Wagoner and Dolly Parton	
October 19	"I See the Want To in Your Eyes"	Conway Twitty	
October 26	"I See the Want To in Your Eyes"	Conway Twitty	
November 2	"I Overlooked an Orchid"	Mickey Gilley	
November 9	"Love Is Like a Butterfly"	Dolly Parton	
November 16	"Country Is"	Tom T. Hall	
November 23	"Trouble in Paradise"	Loretta Lynn	
November 30	"Back Home Again"	John Denver	
December 7	"She Called Me Baby"	Charlie Rich	
December 14	"I Can Help"	Billy Swan	
December 21	"I Can Help"	Billy Swan	
December 28	"What a Man My Man Is"	Lynn Anderson	

== See also ==
- 1974 in music
- List of artists who reached number one on the U.S. country chart
