= Charlie Rich discography =

- Studio albums: 12
- Compilation albums: 11
- Singles: 41
- Number 1 singles: 9

This article is a detailed discography for American singer Charlie Rich.

== Albums ==
=== 1960s ===
Title	Details	Peak positions
Title	Details	US
Lonely Weekends with Charlie Rich	Release date: 1960; Label: Sun Records	—
Charlie Rich	Release date: 1964; Label: Groove Records	—
That's Rich	Release date: 1965; Label: RCA Victor	—
Big Boss Man!	Release date: 1966; Label: RCA Victor	—
The Many New Sides of Charlie Rich	Release date: 1965; Label: Smash Records	—
The Best Years	Release date: 1965; Label: Smash Records	—
Charlie Rich Sings Country & Western	Release date: 1967; Label: Hi Records	—
Set Me Free	Release date: 1968; Label: Epic Records	—
The Fabulous Charlie Rich	Release date: 1969; Label: Epic Records	—
"—" denotes releases that did not chart

=== 1970s ===
Title	Details	Peak chart positions				Certifications (sales thresholds)
Title	Details	US Country	US	AUS	CAN	Certifications (sales thresholds)
Lonely Weekends	Release date: 1970; Label: Sun Records	—	—	—	—	
Boss Man	Release date: 1970; Label: Epic Records	44	—	—	—	
She Loved Everybody but Me	Release date: 1970; Label: RCA Records	—	—	—	—	
A Time for Tears	Release date: 1971; Label: Sun Records	—	—	—	—	
The Best of Charlie Rich	Release date: 1972; Label: Epic Records	4	—	—	—	
I Do My Swingin' at Home	Release date: 1973; Label: Harmony Records	—	—	—	—	
Behind Closed Doors	Release date: 1973; Label: Epic Records	1	8	57	4	US: 4× Platinum; CAN: 2× Platinum
Tomorrow Night	Release date: 1973; Label: RCA Records	24	—	—	—	
Charlie Rich Sings the Songs of Hank Williams & Others	Release date: 1974; Label: Hi Records	33	177	—	—	
The Early Years	Release date: 1974; Label: Sun Records	—	—	—	—	
The Memphis Sound	Release date: 1974; Label: Sun Records	—	—	—	—	
Sun's Golden Treasure	Release date: 1974; Label: Sun Records	—	—	—	—	
Sun's Best of Charlie Rich	Release date: 1974; Label: Sun Records	—	—	—	—	
Arkansas Traveler	Release date: 1974; Label: Power Pak	—	—	—	—	
Fully Realized	Release date: 1974; Label: Mercury Records	11	201	—	—	
She Called Me Baby	Release date: 1974; Label: RCA Records	10	84	—	70	
There Won't Be Anymore	Release date: 1974; Label: RCA Records	1	36	91	30	US: Gold
Very Special Love Songs	Release date: 1974; Label: Epic Records	1	24	45	25	US: Gold
The Best of Charlie Rich	Release date: 1974; Label: Epic Records	4	89	—	81	
Everytime You Touch Me (I Get High)	Release date: 1975; Label: Epic Records	1	54	—	—	
Greatest Hits	Release date: 1975; Label: RCA Records	14	162	—	—	
The Silver Fox	Release date: 1975; Label: Epic Records	1	25	71	47	
Greatest Hits	Release date: 1976; Label: Epic Records	6	148	—	—	
Silver Linings	Release date: 1976; Label: Epic Records	25	160	—	—	
The World of Charlie Rich	Release date: 1976; Label: RCA Records	22	204	—	—	
Big Boss Man/My Mountain Dew	Release date: 1977; Label: RCA Records	38	—	—	—	
Rollin' with the Flow	Release date: 1977; Label: Epic Records	19	180	66	—	
Take Me	Release date: 1977; Label: Epic Records	22	—	—	—	
Classic Rich^{[A]}	Release date: 1978; Label: Epic Records	29	—	—	—	
Classic Rich Vol. 2	Release date: 1978; Label: Epic Records	29	—	—	—	
I Still Believe in Love	Release date: 1978; Label: United Artists Records	—	—	—	—	
The Fool Strikes Again	Release date: 1978; Label: United Artists Records	29	—	—	—	
Nobody but You	Release date: 1979; Label: Liberty Records	—	—	—	—	
"—" denotes releases that did not chart

=== 1980s and 1990s ===
Title	Details	Peak positions
Title	Details	US Country
Once a Drifter	Release date: 1980; Label: Elektra Records	52
Pictures and Paintings	Release date: 1992; Label: Sire Records	—
"—" denotes releases that did not chart

== Singles ==
=== 1960s ===
Year	Single	Peak chart positions					Album
Year	Single	US Country	US BB	US CB	CAN Country	CAN	Album
1960	"Lonely Weekends"	—	22	27	—	—	Lonely Weekends with Charlie Rich
1960	"Gonna Be Waitin'"	—	—	116	—	—	—N/a
1960	"On My Knees"	—	—	105	—	—	—N/a
1961	"Who Will The Next Fool Be"	—	—	102	—	—	—N/a
1961	"Just a Little Bit Sweet"	—	111	129	—	—	—N/a
1963	"Big Boss Man"	—	108	146	—	—	Charlie Rich
1964	"Nice 'N Easy"	—	131	—	—	—	—N/a
1965	"Mohair Sam"	—	21	18	—	6	The Many New Sides
1965	"I Can't Go On"	—	132	109	—	—	The Many New Sides
1966	"Hawg Jaw"	—	125	—	—	—	The Best Years
1968	"Set Me Free"	44	—	—	—	—	Set Me Free
1968	"Raggedy Ann"	45	—	—	18	—	The Fabulous Charlie Rich
1969	"Life's Little Ups and Downs"	41	—	—	—	—	The Fabulous Charlie Rich
"—" denotes releases that did not chart

=== 1970s and 1980s ===
Year	Single	Peak chart positions										Certifications (sales thresholds)	Album
Year	Single	US Country	US	US AC	US CB	AUS	CAN Country	CAN	CAN AC	UK	NLD	Certifications (sales thresholds)	Album
1970	"Who Will the Next Fool Be (re-release)"	67	—	—	—	—	—	—	—	—	—		Lonely Weekends
1970	"July 12, 1939"	47	85	39	72	—	—	76	—	—	—		The Fabulous Charlie Rich
1970	"Nice 'N Easy (re-release)"	37	—	34	—	—	—	—	—	—	—		Boss Man
1971	"A Woman Left Lonely"	72	—	—	—	—	—	—	—	—	—		The Best of Charlie Rich
1971	"A Part of Your Life"	35	—	—	—	—	—	—	—	—	—		The Best of Charlie Rich
1972	"I Take It on Home"	6	—	—	—	—	3	—	—	—	—		Behind Closed Doors
1973	"Behind Closed Doors"	1	15	8	17	18	1	5	37	16	25	US: Platinum	Behind Closed Doors
1973	"The Most Beautiful Girl"	1	1	1	1	7	1	1	1	2	3	US: Gold	Behind Closed Doors
1973	"There Won't Be Anymore"	1	18	15	22	32	1	17	33	—	—		There Won't Be Anymore
1974	"A Very Special Love Song"	1	11	1	8	23	1	4	2	—	—		Very Special Love Songs
1974	"I Don't See Me in Your Eyes Anymore"	1	47	9	59	—	7	46	3	—	—		There Won't Be Anymore
1974	"A Field of Yellow Daisies"	23	—	—	—	—	16	—	—	—	—		Fully Realized
1974	"I Love My Friend"	1	24	1	29	46	1	28	1	—	—		The Silver Fox
1974	"She Called Me Baby"	1	47	41	90	—	1	88	35	—	—		She Called Me Baby
1974	"Something Just Came Over Me"	71	—	—	—	—	—	—	—	—	—		Fully Realized
1975	"My Elusive Dreams"	3	49	16	49	—	5	—	15	—	—		The Silver Fox
1975	"It's All Over Now"	23	—	—	—	13	—	—	—	—	—		There Won't Be Anymore
1975	"We Love Each Other"	—	—	—	—	—	—	—	—	37	—		Behind Closed Doors
1975	"Every Time You Touch Me (I Get High)"	3	19	1	22	86	1	31	2	—	—		Everytime You Touch Me
1975	"All Over Me"	4	—	33	90	—	30	—	33	—	—		Everytime You Touch Me
1975	"Now Everybody Knows"	56	—	—	—	—	—	—	—	—	—		The World of Charlie Rich (Now Everybody Knows)
1975	"Since I Fell for You"	10	71	11	82	—	10	—	11	—	—		Everytime You Touch Me
1976	"America, the Beautiful"(released as "America, the Beautiful (1976)"	22	—	42	78	—	—	—	—	—	—		Greatest Hits
1976	"Road Song"	27	—	31	—	—	—	—	34	—	—		Take Me
1977	"My Mountain Dew"	24	—	—	—	—	14	—	—	—	—		Greatest Hits
1977	"Easy Look"	12	—	—	—	—	13	—	—	—	—		Take Me
1977	"Rollin' with the Flow"	1	101	32	94	47	1	100	35	—	—		Rollin' with the Flow
1978	"Puttin' in Overtime at Home"	8	—	—	—	—	3	—	—	—	—		I Still Believe in Love
1978	"Beautiful Woman"	10	—	—	—	—	2	—	—	—	—		Rollin' with the Flow
1978	"I Still Believe in Love"	46	—	—	—	—	—	—	—	—	—		I Still Believe in Love
1978	"On My Knees" (with Janie Fricke)	1	—	—	—	—	2	—	—	—	—		Take Me
1979	"I'll Wake You Up When I Get Home"	3	—	—	—	—	2	—	—	—	—		Every Which Way but Loose (soundtrack)
1979	"The Fool Strikes Again"	45	—	—	—	—	—	—	39	—	—		The Fool Strikes Again
1979	"I Lost My Head"	26	—	—	—	—	10	—	—	—	—		The Fool Strikes Again
1979	"Spanish Eyes"	20	—	—	—	—	7	—	—	—	—		Take Me
1979	"Life Goes On"	84	—	13	—	—	—	—	36	—	—		The Fool Strikes Again
1979	"You're Gonna Love Yourself in the Morning"	22	—	—	—	—	8	—	—	—	—		Nobody but You
1980	"I'd Build a Bridge"	74	—	—	—	—	—	—	—	—	—		Nobody but You
1980	"Even a Fool Would Let Go"	61	—	—	—	—	—	—	—	—	—		Take Me
1980	"A Man Just Don't Know What a Woman Goes Through"	12	—	—	—	—	26	—	—	—	—		Once a Drifter
1981	"Are We Dreamin' the Same Dream"	26	—	—	—	—	—	—	—	—	—		Once a Drifter
1981	"You Made It Beautiful"	47	—	—	—	—	45	—	—	—	—		Take This Job and Shove It (soundtrack)
"—" denotes releases that did not chart

== Other singles ==
=== Promotional singles ===
Year	Single	Peak chart positions						Album
Year	Single	US Country	US	US AC	CAN Country	CAN	CAN AC	Album
1973	"Tomorrow Night"	29	—	—	53	—	—	Tomorrow Night
"—" denotes releases that did not chart

== Notes ==
- A Classic Rich also peaked at number 6 on the RPM Country Albums chart in Canada.
