= I'm Not Through Loving You Yet =

I'm Not Through Loving You Yet may refer to:

- I'm Not Through Loving You Yet (album), by Conway Twitty
- "I'm Not Through Loving You Yet" (Conway Twitty song)
- "I'm Not Through Loving You Yet" (Louise Mandrell song)
