= You Lay So Easy on My Mind =

Studio album by Andy Williams
- Released: November 1974
- Recorded: June 18–19, 1974; September 18–19, 1974
- Genre: Country
- Length: 29:18
- Label: Columbia
- Producer: Billy Sherrill

Andy Williams chronology
Christmas Present (1974)	You Lay So Easy on My Mind (1974)	The Other Side of Me (1975)

You Lay So Easy on My Mind is the thirty-fourth studio album by American pop singer Andy Williams, released in November 1974 by Columbia Records. The idea for this LP was mentioned in an interview with Williams in the November 3, 1973, issue of Billboard magazine that emphasized his desire to move away from recording albums of Easy Listening covers of hits by other artists, noting that he was "planning an album to be cut in Nashville with Columbia's high-flying country producer, Billy Sherrill." The article coincided with the release of his first attempt to shift directions, Solitaire, which performed poorly in the US. A return to the Easy Listening hits formula, The Way We Were, followed in the spring of 1974 but failed to even chart in the US, so this next attempt to eschew soft rock songs leaned heavily on Country hits.

The album made its first appearance on the Billboard Top LP's & Tapes chart in the issue dated December 28, 1974, and remained there for four weeks, peaking at number 150. The album was released in the UK on February 14, 1975, and on March 1, 1976, the British Phonographic Industry awarded it with Silver certification for sales of 60,000 units.

The first song from the album to be released as a single by Williams was "Another Lonely Song", which entered Billboard magazine's list of the 40 most popular Easy Listening songs of the week in the US in the issue dated September 21, 1974, and stayed on the chart for eight weeks, peaking at number 29. "Cry Softly" entered that same chart in the April 12, 1975, issue and reached number 20 over the course of six weeks, and the title track from the album entered the UK singles chart the following month, on May 31, for a seven-week stay that took the song to number 32.

You Lay So Easy on My Mind was released on compact disc as one of two albums on one CD by Collectables Records on February 19, 2002, along with Williams's 1975 Columbia album, The Other Side of Me. Collectables included this CD in a box set entitled Classic Album Collection, Vol. 2, which contains 15 of his studio albums and two compilations and was released on November 29, 2002. It was also released as one of two albums on one CD by Sony Music Distribution on June 21, 2004, paired this time with Williams's album from 1980, Let's Love While We Can.

== Reception ==
Professional ratings
Review scores
Source	Rating
AllMusic	3/5 stars
Billboard	Top Album Pick
The Encyclopedia of Popular Music	3/5 stars

William Ruhlmann of AllMusic said that the album showed "Williams turned in a particularly affecting version of the 1967 David Houston and Tammy Wynette hit "My Elusive Dreams." Sherrill's production was typical Nashville Sound, with lush strings, a wordless female chorus, tinkling piano, and pedal steel guitar, and Williams sounded fine with such support.

Billboard noted that "Williams has always tried to adapt to the times, and his going Nashville is another step in that direction."

Record World notes "Williams' gentle vocal prowess lends itself well to the material, as is especially obvious on the Peter Allen - penned hit "I Honestly Love You" and "Another Lonely Song."

Record Mirror referred to it as "an easy listening album."

== Track listing ==
=== Side one ===
1. "You Lay So Easy on My Mind" (Charles W. Fields, Bobby G. Rice, Donald L. Riis) - 2:41
2. "I Love You So Much It Hurts" (Floyd Tillman) - 2:33
3. "I Honestly Love You" (Peter Allen, Jeff Barry) - 3:33
4. "A Mi Esposa con Amor (To My Wife with Love)" (Sonny James, Carole Smith) - 3:05
5. "Again" (Joe Allen) - 2:47

=== Side two ===
1. "Another Lonely Song" (Billy Sherrill, Norris Wilson, Tammy Wynette) - 2:56
2. "I'll Have to Say I Love You in a Song" (Jim Croce) - 2:25
3. "I Love My Friend" (Sherrill, Wilson) - 2:33
4. "My Elusive Dreams" (Curly Putman, Sherrill) - 3:36
5. "Cry Softly" (Buddy Killen, Sherrill, Glenn Sutton) - 3:14

== Charts ==
Chart (1974)	Peak position
US Top LP's & Tapes (Billboard)	150

=== Singles ===
Year	Title	U.S. AC	UK singles chart
1974	"Another Lonely Song"	4	—
1974	"Cry Softly"	20	—
1974	"You Lay So Easy on My Mind"	—	32

== Recording dates ==
From the liner notes for the 2002 CD:

- June 18–19, 1974 – "A Mi Esposa con Amor (To My Wife with Love)", "Another Lonely Song", "Cry Softly", "You Lay So Easy on My Mind"
- September 18–19, 1974 – "Again", "I Honestly Love You", "I Love My Friend", "I Love You So Much It Hurts", "I'll Have to Say I Love You in a Song", "My Elusive Dreams"

== Song information ==
Bobby G. Rice made it to number three on the country singles chart in Billboard magazine with "You Lay So Easy on My Mind". The highest charting version of "I Love You So Much It Hurts" was the recording by Jimmy Wakely that went to number one on the magazine's list of Most Played Juke Box Folk Records. Olivia Newton-John reached the top spot on the magazine's pop and Easy Listening charts with "I Honestly Love You", and "A Mi Esposa con Amor (To My Wife with Love)" by Sonny James got as high as number four on the Country singles chart.

Tammy Wynette had number-one country hits with "Another Lonely Song" and "My Elusive Dreams", the latter being a duet with David Houston. Jim Croce's "I'll Have to Say I Love You in a Song" went to number one Easy Listening and number 9 pop. "I Love My Friend" by Charlie Rich made it to the top spot on both the Country and Easy Listening charts, and Nancy Ames made it to number 18 Easy Listening and number 95 pop with "Cry Softly".

== Personnel ==
From the liner notes for the original album:

- Andy Williams - vocals
- Billy Sherrill - producer
- Bill McElhiney - string arrangements ("Another Lonely Song", "Cry Softly", "A Mi Esposa con Amor" and " You Lay So Easy on My Mind")
- Bergen White - string arrangements ("I'll Have To Say I Love You in a Song", "I Honestly Love You", "I Love You So Much It Hurts", "My Elusive Dreams", "Again" and "I Love My Friend")
- The Nashville Edition - background vocals
- Lou Bradley - engineer
- Ron Reynolds - engineer
- Keats Tyler - photography
- John Brogna - design

== Bibliography ==
- Whitburn, Joel (2002), Joel Whitburn's Top Country Singles, 1944-2001, Record Research Inc., ISBN 0-89820-151-9
- Whitburn, Joel (2007), Joel Whitburn Presents Billboard Top Adult Songs, 1961-2006, Record Research Inc., ISBN 978-0-89820-169-7
- Whitburn, Joel (2009), Joel Whitburn's Top Pop Singles, 1955-2008, Record Research Inc., ISBN 978-0-89820-180-2
- Whitburn, Joel (2010), Joel Whitburn Presents Top Pop Albums, Seventh Edition, Record Research Inc., ISBN 978-0-89820-183-3
