= Nancy Ames discography =

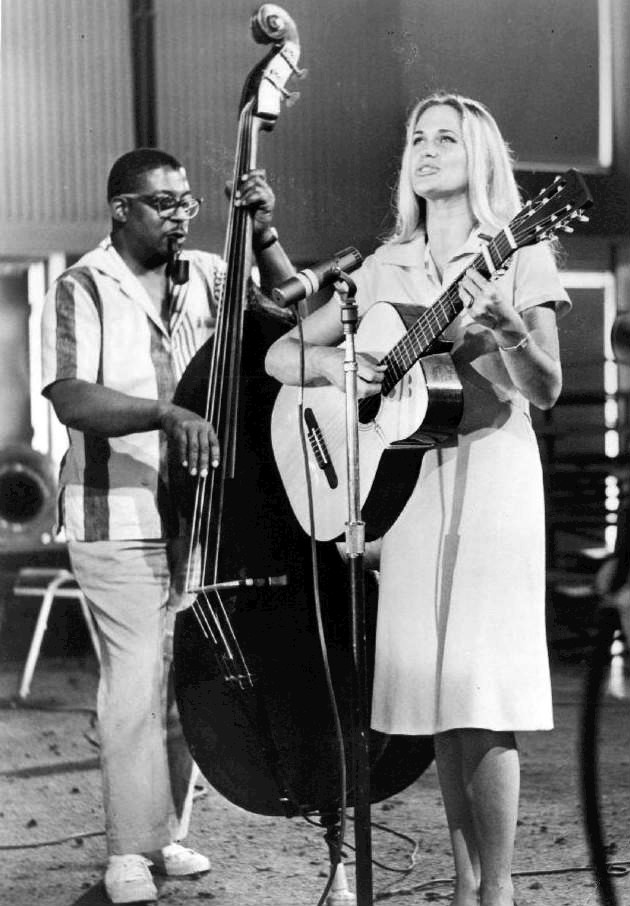
- Ames on Hootenanny in 1963
- Studio albums: 8
- Live albums: 1
- Compilation albums: 1
- Singles: 12

The discography of American singer Nancy Ames contains eight studio albums, one compilation albums, 12 singles, and one live album. Her first releases were albums issued by Liberty Records in 1963, supported by her first single "Bonsoir Cher". In 1964, her album This is the Girl That is reached number 133 on the US Billboard Top LPs chart, becoming her first of two albums to place there. In 1965, "The Funny Thing About It" became her first charting single, "bubbling" under the Hot 100. In 1965, she switched labels to Epic Records. That year and in 1966, Ames achieved commercial success with four singles–"The Funny Thing About It", "He Wore The Green Beret", "Cry Softly", and "Friends And Lovers Forever"–and one Spanish album titled Latin Pulse. "Cry Softly" managed to reach number 18 on the Billboard Easy Listening chart. Her first compilation Versatile Nancy Ames, final studio album Spiced With Brasil, and first live album At The Americana all followed. After 1968, Ames did not record anymore, with only one rereleased song in 1995.

== Albums ==
=== Studio albums ===
List of studio albums, with selected chart positions, and other relevant details
| Title | Album details | Peak chart positions | |
| Title | Album details | US Bill. | US Cash. |
|---|---|---|---|
| The Incredible Nancy Ames | Released: 1963; Label: Liberty – LRP-3276; Formats: LP | — | — |
| A Portrait of Nancy | Released: 1963; Label: Liberty – LRP-3299; Formats: LP | — | — |
| I Will Never Marry | Released: November 1963; Label: Liberty – LRP-3329; Formats: LP | — | — |
| This is the Girl That is | Released: 1964; Label: Liberty – LRP-3369; Formats: LP | 133 | 93 |
| Let It Be Me | Released: 1964; Label: Liberty – LRP-3400; Formats: LP | — | — |
| As Time Goes By | Released: 1965; Label: Liberty – LRP-3400; Formats: LP | — | — |
| Latin Pulse | Released: 1966; Label: Epic – BN 26189; Formats: LP | 133 | 111 |
| Spiced With Brasil | Released: 1967; Label: Epic – LN 24238; Formats: LP | — | — |
"—" denotes a recording that did not chart.

=== Compilation albums ===
List of compilation albums with relevant details
| Title | Album details |
|---|---|
| Versatile Nancy Ames | Released: 1966; Label: Sunset – SUS-5109; Formats: LP |

=== Live albums ===
List of live albums with relevant details
| Title | Album details |
|---|---|
| At The Americana | Released: 1968; Label: Epic – BN 26378; Formats: LP |

== EPs ==
List of extended plays with relevant details
| Title | EP details |
|---|---|
| Cantado En Españo | Released: 1966; Label: Epic – EP 9053; Formats: Extended play |

== Singles ==
List of singles, with selected chart positions, showing other relevant details
| Title | Year | Peak chart positions | | | Album |
| Title | Year | US Pop | US Cash. | US AC | Album |
|---|---|---|---|---|---|
| "Bonsoir Cher" | 1963 | — | — | — | The Incredible Nancy Ames |
| "Malaguena Salerosa" | 1964 | — | — | — | Non-LP release |
| "Let Tonight Linger On" | 1965 | — | — | — | Let It Be Me |
| "I've Got A Lot Of Love (Left In Me)" | 1965 | — | — | — | Non-LP release |
| "The Funny Thing About It" | 1965 | 119 | 125 | — | This Is The Girl That Is |
| "Friends And Lovers Forever" | 1965 | 123 | 141 | — | Non-LP release |
| "He Wore The Green Beret" | 1966 | 89 | 118 | — | As Time Goes By |
| "Cry Softly" | 1966 | 95 | 98 | 18 | Non-LP releases |
| "Love's Like Wine" | 1967 | — | — | — | Spiced With Brasil |
| "Something's Gotten Hold Of My Heart" | 1968 | — | — | — | Non-LP releases |
| "Something's Gotten Hold Of My Heart" (second release) | 1968 | — | — | — | Non-LP releases |
| "Soul Limbo" | 1995 | — | — | — | Non-LP releases |
"—" denotes a recording that did not/was not able to chart.
