= Merle Haggard Presents His 30th Album =

Studio album by Merle Haggard and The Strangers
- Released: August 1974
- Recorded: July 1969, July and October 1973, March and April 1974
- Studio: Columbia (Nashville, Tennessee)
- Genre: Country
- Label: Capitol
- Producer: Ken Nelson, Fuzzy Owen

Merle Haggard and The Strangers chronology
If We Make It Through December (1974)	Merle Haggard Presents His 30th Album (1974)	Keep Movin' On (1975)

Singles from Merle Haggard Presents His 30th Album
- 1. "Things Aren't Funny Anymore" Released: February 11, 1974; 2. "Old Man from the Mountain" Released: June 3, 1974

Merle Haggard Presents His 30th Album is the seventeenth studio album by American country music singer Merle Haggard and The Strangers, released in 1974. Contrary to the album's title, this was his 17th studio album; however, the number 30 included his six collaborative albums (one with Bonnie Owens, and five instrumental albums with The Strangers), three live albums, one 'live' gospel album, one Christmas album, and two greatest hits compilations up to that point.

== Background ==
After only having a hand in writing three songs on his previous album If We Make It Through December, Haggard composed the majority of the tracks on this LP, which became his seventh number one country album. It produced two #1 singles, the melancholy "Things Aren't Funny Anymore" and the rambunctious "Old Man from the Mountain." During a 1999 TNN television special called Merle Haggard: For the Record, country star and Bakersfield sound disciple Dwight Yoakam told the audience at the Las Vegas Hilton that he had been "stopped dead in my tracks" when he heard the destroyed family lament "Holding Things Together," recalling that "it had one verse, and there was nothing left to say after you heard that one verse." Yoakam then performed the verse and later recorded the song itself for his 2003 album In Others' Words. Merle Haggard Presents His 30th Album also includes "The Seashores of Old Mexico," which would become the title track of his second duet LP with Willie Nelson in 1987.

The same year the album came out, Haggard appeared on the cover of TIME magazine.

== Critical reception ==
Professional ratings
Review scores
Source	Rating
AllMusic	3.5/5 stars
Christgau's Record Guide	B+

Mark Deming of AllMusic wrote "If Merle Haggard didn't come up with a masterpiece for his 30th album, you could argue he didn't have to—he made consistently stronger albums than most of his contemporaries in country music, and he was still doing that 30 LPs and nine years into his recording career, and that in itself is a pretty impressive accomplishment." Music critic Robert Christgau wrote "The man has been making them for less than a decade, and thirty is too damn many. But this is clearly where Haggard wants to show off his range, and the display, featuring more original songs than he's put in one place for a long time, is pretty impressive. There's a rip-roaring infidelity lyric that's definitely one of his genius pieces—"Old Man From the Mountain," it's called, complete with bluegrass shading. And though after that only "Honky Tonk Night Time Man" and the Bob Wills/Lefty Frizzell cover are liable to be remembered, just about everything else is liable to be enjoyed." In his book Merle Haggard: The Running Kind, biographer David Cantwell calls the LP "emblematic" of Haggard's less focused albums in the mid seventies.

== Track listing ==
All songs by Merle Haggard unless otherwise noted:

1. "Old Man from the Mountain"
2. "Things Aren't Funny Anymore"
3. "White Man Singin' the Blues"
4. "Travelin'" (Ronnie Reno, Tiny Moore)
5. "The Girl Who Made Me Laugh" (Haggard, Roy Nichols)
6. "Honky Tonk Night Time Man"
7. "Holding Things Together"
8. "The Seashores of Old Mexico"
9. "Don't Give Up on Me"
10. "A King Without a Queen" (Bob Wills, John Wills, Martha Dean Moore)
11. "It Don't Bother Me" (Mark Yeary)

== Personnel ==
- Merle Haggard – vocals, guitar

The Strangers:

- Roy Nichols – lead guitar
- Norman Hamlet – steel guitar, dobro
- Tiny Moore – mandolin
- Ronnie Reno – guitar
- Mark Yeary – piano
- Johnny Meeks – bass
- Biff Adam – drums

with

- Dave Kirby – guitar
- Johnny Gimble – fiddle

and

- James Burton – guitar
- Hargus "Pig" Robbins – piano, organ
- Glen D. Hardin – piano
- Chuck Berghofer – bass
- Bill Puett – horns

== Chart positions ==
Chart (1974)	Peak position
Billboard Country albums	1
