= Long Long Road =

Studio album by Ringo Starr
- Released: 24 April 2026
- Recorded: 2025
- Genres: Country rock; country
- Length: 33:22
- Label: UME
- Producer: T Bone Burnett

Ringo Starr chronology
| Look Up (2025) | Long Long Road (2026) |

Singles from Long Long Road
- 1. "It's Been Too Long" Released: 3 March 2026; 2. "Choose Love" Released: 3 April 2026

Long Long Road is the twenty-second studio album by English singer-songwriter Ringo Starr, released on 24 April 2026. It was released through Universal Music Enterprises. It is Starr's third country and Americana album, following Beaucoups of Blues (1970) and Look Up (2025), and it features guest appearances from Billy Strings, Sheryl Crow, St. Vincent, Molly Tuttle, and Sarah Jarosz.

Long Long Road is Starr's second album in collaboration with American producer and songwriter T Bone Burnett. Burnett wrote or co-wrote six of the tracks on the album, including the first single "It's Been Too Long". Starr also co-wrote three songs on the album, including two of the tracks with Bruce Sugar, and the re-recording of "Choose Love" from his 2005 album of the same title . Additionally, Starr covered Carl Perkins' 1959 version of "I Don't See Me in Your Eyes Anymore", written by Bennie Benjamin and George David Weiss.

== Release ==
On 3 March 2026, Starr announced the album's release date of 24 April, as well as opening pre-orders for the album on vinyl, colored vinyl, and CD formats. Starr also released the first single from the album, "It's Been Too Long" on the same day, along with a visualizer video. The second single from the album, a re-recording of the title track to his 2005 album Choose Love, was released a month later on 3 April 2026.

== Reception ==
Professional ratings
Aggregate scores
| Source | Rating |
|---|---|
| Metacritic | 77/100 |
Review scores
| Source | Rating |
| AllMusic | 3.5/5 stars |
| Clash | 7/10 |
| Exclaim! | 6/10 |
| Hot Press | 7.5/10 |
| The Arts Desk | 4/5 stars |
| The Telegraph | 3/5 stars |

According to the review aggregator Metacritic, Long Long Road received "generally favorable reviews" based on a weighted average score of 77 out of 100 from 7 critic scores.

Critic Nicolás Isasi stated, "Molly Tuttle, who already appeared last year with a special chemistry and her enchanting voice on "Can You Hear Me Call", this time establishes herself as the most consistent female presence on the album, both vocally and musically, thanks to her performance on several acoustic guitar passages. This new album, consisting of ten songs, represents a journey through part of her artistic career with the same freshness and energy as always."

== Track listing ==
| No. | Title | Writer(s) | Length |
|---|---|---|---|
| 1. | "Returning Without Tears" | T Bone Burnett; Joe Henry | 2:23 |
| 2. | "Baby Don't Go" | Burnett | 3:41 |
| 3. | "I Don't See Me in Your Eyes Anymore" | Bennie Benjamin; George David Weiss | 2:52 |
| 4. | "It's Been Too Long" | Burnett; Daniel Tashian | 2:42 |
| 5. | "Why" | Burnett | 2:50 |
| 6. | "You and I (Wave of Love)" | Richard Starkey; Bruce Sugar | 3:52 |
| 7. | "My Baby Don't Want Nothing" | Burnett | 4:11 |
| 8. | "Choose Love" | Starkey; Gary Burr; Mark Hudson | 3:54 |
| 9. | "She's Gone" | Burnett; Paul Kennerley; Tashian | 3:18 |
| 10. | "Long Long Road" | Starkey; Sugar | 3:39 |
| Total length: | | | 33:22 |

== Personnel ==
Credits are adapted from Tidal.

- Ringo Starr – lead vocals, drums (all tracks), harmony vocal (2), bongos (9)
- T Bone Burnett – production (all tracks), electric guitar (2, 4, 8), acoustic guitar (4, 7), mandolin (10)
- Daniel Tashian – co-production, vocal arrangements (all tracks), vocal choruses (3, 6-7, 10), harmony vocal (4), background vocal (5), electric guitar (4, 6, 7), mandolin (6)
- Bruce Sugar – co-production
- Dennis Crouch – bass (1-7, 9-10), string bass (8)
- Patrick Warren – keyboards (1–4, 7), organ (8), chamberlain (8), orchestration (2-5, 7, 10), strings (8)
- David Mansfield – violin (1), electric guitar (4, 5), 12-string electric guitar (4), farfisa (4), claps (4), acoustic guitar (6, 8, 9), fiddle (9), strings (6, 9), viola (10)
- Rory Hoffman – crypto clav (1, 3, 4, 6, 8–10)
- Paul Franklin – steel guitar (1, 3, 6, 10), pedal steel guitar (8)
- Molly Tuttle – lead vocals (6), harmony vocal (1, 6, 9), background vocals (4), acoustic guitar (1, 5)
- Mike Stankiewicz – tambourine (2, 4, 7), percussion (5)
- Billy Strings – harmony vocal (2, 5, 7,), acoustic guitar (2, 5), electric guitar (7)
- Colin Linden – electric guitar (3, 7, 8), dobro (8)
- St. Vincent – vocal harmonies (8)
- Sheryl Crow – harmony vocal (10)
- Sarah Jarosz - background vocals (4)
- Todd Lombardo - classic acoustic guitar (9)
- Michael Piersante - claps (5), tambourine (6)

== Charts ==
| Chart (2026) | Peak position |
|---|---|
| Austrian Albums (Ö3 Austria) | 12 |
| Belgian Albums (Ultratop Flanders) | 32 |
| Belgian Albums (Ultratop Wallonia) | 76 |
| Dutch Vinyl Albums (Dutch Charts) | 32 |
| French Albums (SNEP) | 173 |
| German Albums (Offizielle Top 100) | 11 |
| Japanese Rock Albums (Oricon) | 17 |
| Japanese Top Albums Sales (Billboard Japan) | 58 |
| Japanese Western Albums (Oricon) | 15 |
| Norwegian Physical Albums (IFPI Norge) | 3 |
| Scottish Albums (Official Charts) | 8 |
| Swedish Physical Albums (Sverigetopplistan) | 5 |
| Swiss Albums (Schweizer Hitparade) | 11 |
| UK Albums (Official Charts) | 85 |
| UK Americana Albums (Official Charts) | 2 |
| UK Country Albums (Official Charts) | 2 |
| US Americana/Folk Albums (Billboard) | 15 |
| US Top Album Sales (Billboard) | 9 |
| US Top Country Albums (Billboard) | 40 |
