= It's Been Too Long =

Single by Ringo Starr

from the album Long Long Road
- Released: 3 March 2026
- Genre: Country rock
- Length: 2:42
- Label: UM^{e}
- Songwriters: T Bone Burnett; Daniel Tashian
- Producers: Burnett; Tashian; Bruce Sugar

Ringo Starr singles chronology
"Look Up" (2025)	"It's Been Too Long" (2026)	"Choose Love" (2026)

Official visualizer
- "It's Been Too Long" on YouTube

"It's Been Too Long" is a song by Ringo Starr, released on 3 March 2026 as the lead single from his album Long Long Road (2026), via UM^{e}. The song was written by T Bone Burnett and Daniel Tashian.

== Background and composition ==
"It's Been Too Long" features uncredited guest backing vocals from Molly Tuttle and Sarah Jarosz. The track calls back to Starr's recent country influences, specifically with the guitars and backing vocals.

== Release and reception ==
The track was released as the first single from Starr's album Long Long Road (2026) and is the fourth track on the album. Writing for NME, Max Pilley notes that "Ringo's voice takes the lead on the wistful track, over twanging Americana guitars and warm production". in a Stereoboard article, Jon Stickler writes that it is "a rootsy country-rock offering built on strummed guitars and a steady beat".

== Credits and personnel ==
Adapted from Tidal:

Performers

- Ringo Starr – vocals, drums
- T Bone Burnett – acoustic guitar, producer, composer, lyricist
- Dennis Crouch – bass
- Patrick Warren – keyboard
- Rory Hoffmann – keyboard
- Mike Stankiewicz – tambourine
- David Mansfield – 12 string electric guitar
- Molly Tuttle – backing vocals
- Sarah Jarosz – backing vocals

Technical

- Daniel Tashian – co-producer composer, lyricist, vocal arranger
- Bruce Sugar – co-producer
