= Ella Washington =

American singer (born 1943)

- Also known as: Ella Washington Cobbs
- Born: October 25, 1943 (age 82); Miami, Florida, U.S.
- Genres: Rhythm and blues, soul, gospel
- Occupation: Vocalist
- Years active: 1965–1972, occasionally later
- Labels: Octavia, Sound Stage 7

Ella Washington (born October 25, 1943) is an American former R&B and gospel singer, described as "an outstanding Southern soul vocalist" and best known for her 1969 hit "He Called Me Baby". She later became a church pastor.

== Biography ==
Washington was born in Miami, Florida, and first recorded in 1965 for the local Octavia label. Her single "The Grass Always Seems Greener" was leased to Atlantic Records for release, but did not achieve commercial success.

In 1967, she began recording for the Sound Stage 7 label in Nashville, Tennessee. Several of her records were produced by radio disc jockey John Richbourg, and were recorded in Muscle Shoals, Alabama. Her third single for Sound Stage 7, "He Called Me Baby", was a reworking of a 1962 song by Harlan Howard (originally "She Called Me Baby"), which had previously been recorded by many country singers including Bobby Bare and Patsy Cline. Washington's version reached # 77 on the Billboard Hot 100, and # 38 on the Billboard R&B chart, but was her only hit record. However, she released an LP, Ella Washington, in 1969, and a succession of singles on the Sound Stage 7 label through to 1972, including "Stop Giving Your Man Away" and "Trying To Make You Love Me".

In 1973, she turned from secular to gospel music. She sang "Amazing Grace" and "Because He Lives" at John Richbourg's funeral in 1986. By 2009, as Ella Washington Cobbs, she was pastor at Theos Ministries church in Opa-locka, Miami-Dade County, Florida.

The first compilation album of her recordings, Nobody But Me, was released by Charly Records in 1987. A CD of her recordings for Sound Stage 7, He Called Me Baby, was issued on the Soulscape label in 2009.
