= This Time I Almost Made It =

Studio album by Barbara Mandrell
- Released: August 16, 1974
- Recorded: November 18, 1970–c. April 1974
- Studios: Columbia (Nashville, Tennessee)
- Genre: Country
- Label: Columbia
- Producer: Billy Sherrill

Barbara Mandrell chronology
The Midnight Oil (1973)	This Time I Almost Made It (1974)	This Is Barbara Mandrell (1976)

Singles from This Is Barbara Mandrell
- 1. "This Time I Almost Made It" Released: May 13, 1974; 2. "Wonder When My Baby's Coming Home" Released: January 20, 1975

This Time I Almost Made It is the third solo studio album by American country music singer, Barbara Mandrell, released in 1974.

This would be Mandrell's last album with record company Columbia before the label dropped her. She would later switch to ABC/Dot and enjoy the most successful part of her career under the record company. This album spawned two singles that charted on the Hot Country Singles & Tracks chart. The first single, the title track peaked at #12. The second single, "Wonder When My Baby's Coming Home" barely cracked the Top 40, peaking at only #39. The album only reached #41 on the Top Country Albums chart.

In 2016, an expanded version of the album was released on CD, containing the bonus tracks listed below.

== Track listing ==
1. "This Time I Almost Made It" (Billy Sherrill)
2. "Right Back Feeling Like a Woman" (Sherrill, Jerry Chesnut)
3. "Wisdom of a Fool" (Roy Alfred, Abner Silver)
4. "You're All I Need to Get By" (Nickolas Ashford, Valerie Simpson)
5. "Wonder When My Baby's Coming Home" (Kermit Goell, Arthur Kent)
6. "Keep On Singing" (Danny Janssen, Bobby Hart)
7. "A Very Special Love Song" (Sherrill, Norro Wilson)
8. "Today I Started Loving You Again" (Merle Haggard, Bonnie Owens)
9. "Kiss the Hurt Away" (Finley Duncan, Chuck Reed)
10. "Words" (Barry Gibb, Maurice Gibb, Robin Gibb)
11. "Something" (George Harrison)

Bonus tracks

1. "I Hope You Love Me" (George Jones, Tammy Wynette)
2. "You Can Always Come Back" (Curly Putman)
3. "Coming Home Soldier" (Bobby Vinton, Gene Allan)
4. "Stay There Till I Get There" (Glenn Sutton)
5. "I Take It Back" (Perry Buie, James Cobb)
6. "Dim Lights, Thick Smoke (And Loud, Loud Music)" (Joe Maphis, Rose Lee Maphis, Max Fidler)
7. "You Took Him Off My Hands" (Harlan Howard, Wynn Stewart, Skeets McDonald)
8. "Son-Of-A-Gun" (Toni Dae, Bobbi Odom)
9. "Scarlet Water" (Freddy Weller, Spooner Oldham)

== Charts ==
Chart performance for This Time I Almost Made It
Chart (1974)	Peak position
US Top Country Albums (Billboard)	41

Chart performance of singles
Year	Single	Chart	Peak position
1974	"This Time I Almost Made It"	US Hot Country Songs (Billboard)	12
1975	"Wonder When My Baby's Coming Home"	US Hot Country Songs (Billboard)	39
