= Wonder When My Baby's Coming Home =

Single by Barbara Mandrell

from the album This Time I Almost Made It
- B-side: "Kiss the Hurt Away"
- Released: January 20, 1975
- Recorded: April 1974
- Studio: Columbia Studio
- Genre: Countrypolitan; soul
- Length: 2:10
- Label: Columbia
- Songwriter(s): Kermit Goell; Arthur Kent
- Producer(s): Billy Sherrill

Barbara Mandrell singles chronology
"This Time I Almost Made It" (1974)	"Wonder When My Baby's Coming Home" (1975)	"Standing Room Only" (1975)

"Wonder When My Baby's Coming Home" is a song written by Kermit Goell and Arthur Kent. It was first recorded on May 21, 1942 by Kay Kyser and His Orchestra. Charles Brown and his Band recorded a version as "I Wonder When My Baby's Coming Home" in March 1950.

The best known cover of the tune is by American country music artist Barbara Mandrell who released in January 1975 as the second single from the album This Time I Almost Made It. It was one of Mandrell's early single releases in her career and reached the top 40 of the American country songs chart.

== History ==
"Wonder When My Baby's Coming Home" was first recorded on May 21, 1942 by Kay Kyser and His Orchestra. Shep Fields and His New Music with vocalist Ken Curtis, Swing and Sway with Sammy Kaye, Joan Merrill and Jimmy Dorsey recorded it with his orchestra in June 1942. Johnny "Scat" Davis recorded it with his orchestra in July 1942. Charles Brown and his Band recorded a version as "I Wonder When My Baby's Coming Home" in March 1950. Bull Moose Jackson and His Buffalo Bearcats recorded the tune in May 1951.

== Mandrell recording ==
Barbara Mandrell made a series of a charting top 40 country singles during her stint with Columbia Records in the early 1970s. Her Columbia recordings cut with producer Billy Sherrill combined country with soul music together. Among these songs was "Wonder When My Baby's Coming Home". Sherrill served as the producer for "Wonder When My Baby's Coming Home". It was recorded at the Columbia Recording Studio, located in Nashville, Tennessee. The session took place in April 1974.

"This Time I Almost Made It" was released as a single on Columbia Records on January 20, 1975. It was backed on the B-side by the song "Kiss the Hurt Away". The track was issued by the label as a seven inch vinyl single. The single peaked within the top 40 of the Billboard Hot Country Songs chart, peaking at number 39. It among Mandrell's final single releases for Columbia before moving to a different record label in 1975. The song was released on Mandrell's third studio LP, also titled This Time I Almost Made It. The album was released in September 1974.

=== Track listing ===
7" vinyl single

- "Wonder When My Baby's Coming Home" – 2:10
- "Kiss the Hurt Away" – 2:28

== Charts ==
Chart performance for "Wonder When My Baby's Coming Home"
Chart (1975)	Peak position
US Hot Country Songs (Billboard)	39
