= This Time I Almost Made It (song) =

Single by Barbara Mandrell

from the album This Time I Almost Made It
- B-side: "Son-of-a-Gun"
- Released: May 13, 1974
- Recorded: April 9, 1974
- Studio: Columbia Studio
- Genre: Countrypolitan; soul
- Length: 2:16
- Label: Columbia
- Songwriter(s): Billy Sherrill
- Producer(s): Billy Sherrill

Barbara Mandrell singles chronology
"The Midnight Oil" (1973)	"This Time I Almost Made It" (1974)	"Wonder When My Baby's Coming Home" (1974)

"This Time I Almost Made It" is a song written by Billy Sherrill, and recorded by American country music artist Barbara Mandrell. It was released in May 1974 as the first single and title track from the album This Time I Almost Made It. It was one of Mandrell's early single releases in her career and among her first to reached the top 20 on the American country songs chart.

Tammy Wynette also recorded a version on her 1974 Columbia release Woman to Woman

== Background and recording ==
Barbara Mandrell made her first major records for the Columbia label in the early 1970s. Her Columbia recordings cut with producer Billy Sherrill combined country with soul music together. Among these songs was Sherrill's self-penned "This Time I Almost Made It". Sherrill also served as the song's producer. It was recorded at the Columbia Recording Studio, located in Nashville, Tennessee. The session took place on April 9, 1974. On the same recording session, Mandrell also cut "Son-of-a-Gun".

== Release and chart performance ==
"This Time I Almost Made It" was released as a single on Columbia Records on May 13, 1974. It was backed on the B-side by the song "Son-of-a-Gun". The track was issued by the label as a seven inch vinyl single. The single spent 12 weeks on America's Billboard country songs chart, peaking at number 12 by August 1974. It among Mandrell's final single releases for Columbia before moving to a different record label in 1975. The song was released on Mandrell's third studio LP, also titled This Time I Almost Made It. The album was released in September 1974.

== Track listing ==
7" vinyl single

- "This Time I Almost Made It" – 2:16
- "Son-of-a-Gun" – 2:22

== Charts ==
Chart performance for "This Time I Almost Made It"
Chart (1974)	Peak position
US Hot Country Songs (Billboard)	12
