= I Do My Swingin' at Home =

I Do My Swingin’ at Home

Compilation album by Charlie Rich
- Released: 1973
- Genre: Country
- Label: Harmony, Embassy (CBS), Epic

Charlie Rich chronology
The Best of Charlie Rich (1972)	I Do My Swingin’ at Home (1973)	Behind Closed Doors (1973)

I Do My Swingin’ at Home is a compilation album by American country music singer Charles (Charlie) Rich, released in 1973 on the Harmony label, in 1975 on the Embassy label in the UK and on the Summit label in Australia, and on the Epic label in the Netherlands in 1974. Two tracks were written by his wife, Margaret Ann Rich (1933 - 2010) to whom Charlie credited much of his success.

== Track listing ==
Side 1

1. "Sittin’ and Thinkin’" (Charlie Rich) – 2:50
2. "The Proudest, Loneliest Fool" (Gregg Galbraith, Ricci Mareno) – 2:33
3. "Mama Take Me Home" (Carmol Taylor) – 2:55
4. "Have a Heart" (Margaret Ann Rich) – 3:06
5. "Have You Ever Been Lonely (Have You Ever Been Blue)" (George Brown, Peter de Rose) – 2:14

Side 2

1. "Life Has Its Little Ups and Downs" (Margaret Ann Rich) – 3:37
2. "Daddy Don't You Walk So Fast" (Peter Callander, Geoff Stephens) – 2:31
3. "Golden Slipper Rose" (Curly Putman) – 2:48
4. "Papa Was a Good Man" (Hal Bynum) – 2:27
5. "I Do My Swingin’ at Home" (Billy Sherrill) – 2:24
