= This Time (Waylon Jennings album) =

Studio album by Waylon Jennings
- Released: April 1974
- Recorded: 1973
- Studios: Glaser Sound (Nashville, Tennessee)
- Genre: Outlaw Country
- Length: 29:02
- Label: RCA Victor
- Producers: Waylon Jennings; Willie Nelson

Waylon Jennings chronology
Honky Tonk Heroes (1973)	This Time (1974)	The Ramblin' Man (1974)

Singles from This Time
- 1. "This Time" Released: April 1974

This Time is the twentieth studio album by American country music artist Waylon Jennings, released on RCA Victor in 1974, at the peak of the outlaw country movement. It was produced by Jennings and Willie Nelson.

== Recording ==
Although Jennings had won artistic autonomy from RCA in 1972, giving him the freedom to produce his own records, he was still irritated by RCA executives, who kept a close eye on his recording sessions at RCA Victor Studios and had even delayed the release of his 1973 album Honky Tonk Heroes. In his autobiography, Jennings wrote that although he had agreed to record in their studios, the RCA engineers were constantly calling upstairs to executive Jerry Bradley, keeping him aware of everything Jennings did. Fed up with the aggravation, Jennings decided to record his next album at Tompall Glaser's Glaser Sound recording studio at 916 Nineteenth Avenue South, nicknamed "Hillbilly Central," with Willie Nelson co-producing. Glaser, a Nashville veteran who had achieved fame with the Glaser Brothers, had co-produced Honky Tonk Heroes, a touchstone of the outlaw country movement. In his book Outlaw: Waylon, Willie, Kris, and the Renegades of Nashville, author Michael Striessguth describes the atmosphere at the studio, which contrasted sharply with RCA's strict recording traditions:

"Its doors propped open to let in the young breezes sweeping through the West End, the so-called Hillbilly Central offices became an outlaw safe haven. Former employees recalled Willie Nelson lazing on the front lawn, and Waylon haunting the offices at three in the morning...The studio hosted a fraternity of singers, songwriters and Nashville dropouts living the verse of a strumming and bumming honky tonk song...Sessions burned into the small hours until Tompall and his entourage peeled out into the streets in search of pinball machines, drinks, and greasy food."

According to Streissguth, the first song Jennings recorded at Glaser's studio in October 1973 was J.J. Cale's "Louisiana Women" with Kyle Lehning engineering. Lehning, who would achieve fame in the 1980s producing albums for Randy Travis, contributed Wurlitzer electric piano to the Cale song and the trumpet part to "Heaven and Hell." "You just can't believe how different everything sounded when he moved from RCA," Glaser explained in the 2003 documentary Beyond Nashville. "The bottom was fat and big again...You could hear the drum, it wasn't a little tick in the back. It was marvellous." Jennings agreed, stating, "There was a freedom there that I didn't have any place else. Both of us could experiment...It was a fraternity, and Nashville was our college town."

== Critical reception ==
This Time peaked at #4 on the Billboard country albums chart, his best showing there since 1967. Stephen Thomas Erlewine of AllMusic writes, "It's not that the monochromaticity makes it a lesser affair than its predecessor, yet the whole thing does feel a bit reserved and not quite as overpowering as a sequel to Honky Tonk Heroes should be. Still, it's a first-rate record - perhaps not a classic, but a subdued, understated album unlike anything in his catalog."

Professional ratings
Review scores
Source	Rating
Allmusic	link
Rolling Stone	(not rated) link

== Track listing ==
No.	Title	Writer(s)	Length
1.	"This Time"	Waylon Jennings	2:25
2.	"Louisiana Women"	J.J. Cale	4:04
3.	"Pick Up the Tempo"	Willie Nelson	2:34
4.	"Slow Rollin' Low"	Billy Joe Shaver	2:46
5.	"Heaven or Hell"	Nelson	1:40
6.	"It's Not Supposed to Be That Way"	Nelson	3:30
7.	"Slow Movin' Outlaw"	Dee Moeller	3:41
8.	"Mona"	Jessi Colter	2:49
9.	"Walkin'"	Nelson	2:30
10.	"If You Could Touch Her at All"	Lee Clayton	3:03

=== Bonus tracks ===
1. "That'll Be the Day" (Jerry Allison, Buddy Holly, Norman Petty) – 2:25
2. "It Doesn't Matter Anymore" (Paul Anka) – 2:56
3. "Lady in the Harbor" (Allison, Sonny Curtis, Doug Gilmore, Jennings) – 3:42
4. "Medley: Well All Right/It's So Easy/Maybe Baby/Peggy Sue" (Allison, Holly, Petty, Joe Mauldin) – 6:07
5. "If You're Goin' Girl" (Bobby Bond) – 3:45

== Personnel ==
- Guitar: Sonny Curtis, Waylon Jennings, Willie Nelson,
  Fred Newell, Larry Whitmore, Reggie Young
  Steel guitar: Ralph Mooney
- Bass: Duke Goff, Joe Osborn
- Keyboards: Jessi Colter, Kyle Lehning, Dee Moeller
- Drums: Richie Albright, Jerry Allison
- Harmonica: Don Brooks
- Horns: Kyle Lehning

== Charts ==
=== Weekly charts ===
Chart (1974)	Peak position
US Top Country Albums (Billboard)	4

=== Year-end charts ===
Chart (1974)	Position
US Top Country Albums (Billboard)	16
