= Woman to Woman (Tammy Wynette album) =

Studio album by Tammy Wynette
- Released: November 25, 1974
- Recorded: June 1974
- Studio: Columbia (Nashville, Tennessee)
- Genre: Country
- Length: 29:03
- Label: Epic
- Producer: Billy Sherrill

Tammy Wynette chronology
Another Lonely Song (1974)	Woman to Woman (1974)	George & Tammy & Tina (1975)

Singles from Woman to Woman
- 1. "Woman to Woman" Released: July 1974

Professional ratings
Review scores
Source	Rating
Allmusic	3/5 stars

Woman to Woman is the thirteenth studio album by American country music singer-songwriter Tammy Wynette. It was released on November 25, 1974, by Epic Records.

== Commercial performance ==
The album peaked at No. 21 on the Billboard Country Albums chart. The album's only single, "Woman to Woman", peaked at No. 4 on the Billboard Country Singles chart.

== Track listing ==
Side one
No.	Title	Writer(s)	Length
1.	"Woman to Woman"	Billy Sherrill	2:57
2.	"Right Here in Your Arms"	Rafe Van Hoy	2:44
3.	"What's a Little Rain?"	Leon Ashley, Margie Singleton	2:23
4.	"This Time I Almost Made It"	Sherrill	2:13
5.	"Please Come to Boston (Dave Loggins cover)"	Dave Loggins	3:58

Side two
No.	Title	Writer(s)	Length
1.	"I Don't Think About Him No More"	Mickey Newbury	3:58
2.	"For the Kids (Waylon Jennings cover)"	Shel Silverstein	3:09
3.	"The Woman I Am"	Carl Montgomery, Earl Montgomery, George Jones, Tammy Wynette	2:55
4.	"Touching Love"	Sherrill, Carmol Taylor, Norro Wilson	2:27
5.	"I've Been Loved Before (But Not Like This)"	E. Montgomery, Jones	2:19

== Personnel ==
Adapted from the album liner notes.

- Bill Barnes - cover design, photography
- Lou Bradley - engineer
- Julie Holiner - design
- Bill McElhiney - string arrangements
- Billy Sherrill - producer
- Bergen White - string arrangements
- Tammy Wynette - lead vocals

== Chart positions ==
=== Album ===
Year	Chart	Peak position
1974	Country Albums (Billboard)	21

=== Singles ===
Year	Single	Chart	Peak position
1974	"Woman To Woman"	Country Singles (Billboard)	4
