= Cry Softly =

Single by Andy Williams

from the album You Lay So Easy on My Mind
- B-side: "You Lay So Easy on My Mind"
- Released: March 1975
- Genre: Easy listening
- Length: 3:12
- Label: Columbia Records 10113
- Songwriters: Buddy Killen, Billy Sherrill, Glenn Sutton

Andy Williams singles chronology
| "Love Said Goodbye" (1975) | "Cry Softly" (1975) | "Sad Eyes" (1975) |

"Cry Softly" is a song written by Buddy Killen, Billy Sherrill, and Glenn Sutton. It is based on Liebesträume by Franz Liszt. Nancy Ames originally recorded the song in 1966. Her version reached No. 95 on the Billboard Hot 100, and a lower No. 98 on the Cashbox Top 100 Singles charts

== Cover versions ==
Andy Williams included a version on his 1974 album You Lay So Easy on My Mind. The song reached #20 on the adult contemporary chart in 1975.
