= Honky Tonk Angel (Conway Twitty album) =

Studio album by Conway Twitty
- Released: 1974
- Recorded: 1973–1974
- Genre: Country
- Label: MCA
- Producer: Owen Bradley

Conway Twitty chronology
Clinging To A Saving Hand / Steal Away (1973)	Honky Tonk Angel (1974)	I'm Not Through Loving You Yet (1974)

Honky Tonk Angel is the twenty-ninth studio album by American country music artist Conway Twitty, released in 1974. It contains the single and title track "There's a Honky Tonk Angel (Who'll Take Me Back In)".

== Track listing ==
No.	Title	Writer(s)	Length
1.	"There's a Honky Tonk Angel (Who'll Take Me Back In)"	Troy Seals, Denny Rice	2:56
2.	"Pop a Top"	Nat Stuckey	2:10
3.	"Somewhere Just Out of Her Mind"	L. E. White	2:13
4.	"Making Plans"	Johnny Russell, Voni Morrison	2:59
5.	"Don't Let It Go to Your Heart"	Joe E. Lewis, Conway Twitty	2:41
6.	"A Bad Seed My Daddy Sowed"	Peggy Forman	3:15
7.	"Before Your Time"	Twitty, Tommy Markman	2:37
8.	"Love Is the Foundation"	William Cody Hall	2:51
9.	"Pick Me Up on Your Way Down"	Harlan Howard	2:40
10.	"Amazing Love"	John Schweers	3:00
11.	"A Simple Country Girl"	White	2:57
