= Woman to Woman (Tammy Wynette song) =

Single by Tammy Wynette

from the album Woman to Woman
- B-side: "Love Me Forever"
- Released: July 1974
- Studio: Columbia (Nashville, Tennessee)
- Genre: Country
- Label: Epic
- Songwriter: Billy Sherrill

Tammy Wynette singles chronology
| "Another Lonely Song" (1973) | "Woman to Woman" (1974) | "(You Make Me Want to Be a) Mother" (1975) |

"Woman to Woman" is a song written by Billy Sherrill, and recorded by American country music artist Tammy Wynette. It was released in July 1974 as the only single from her album of the same name. The song peaked at number 4 on the Billboard Hot Country Singles chart. It also reached number 1 on the RPM Country Tracks chart in Canada.

== Cover versions ==
"Woman to Woman" was covered by Wynonna Judd on the 1998 album Tammy Wynette Remembered. Judd's version peaked at number 62 on the Billboard Hot Country Singles & Tracks chart.

== Chart performance ==
=== Tammy Wynette ===
| Chart (1974) | Peak position |
|---|---|
| Canada Country Singles (RPM) | 1 |
| US Hot Country Songs (Billboard) | 4 |

=== Wynonna Judd ===
| Chart (1998) | Peak position |
|---|---|
| Canada Country Singles (RPM) | 72 |
| US Hot Country Songs (Billboard) | 62 |
