= Nancy Ames =

American folk singer and songwriter (born 1937)

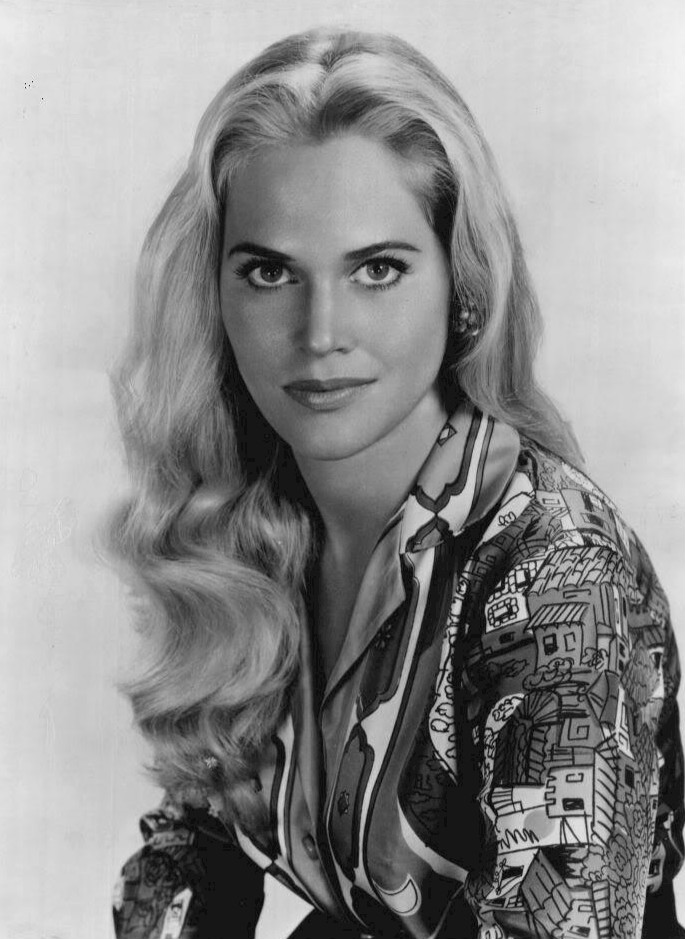
- Ames in 1964

Background information
- Born: Nancy Hamilton Alfaro; September 30, 1937 (age 88); Washington, D.C., U.S.
- Occupations: Vocalist, songwriter
- Spouse(s): Triaian Boyer (1964–1968); Jay Riviere (div. ca. 1970); Danny Ward (m., ca. 1972)

Nancy Ames (born Nancy Hamilton Alfaro; September 30, 1937) is an American folk singer and songwriter. She regularly appeared on the American version of the television series That Was the Week That Was. The TW3 Girl, as she was known, sang the show theme and special material.

== Personal life ==
Ames was born in Washington, D.C., the granddaughter of Ricardo Joaquín Alfaro, who served as President of Panama from 1931 to 1932 and who in 1949 was chairman of the legal committee of the Third session of the United Nations General Assembly that drew up the text of the Convention on Genocide.

The daughter of a physician, she grew up in Washington. She attended Holton-Arms School and Bennett College, both of them for girls. By 1964, she was married to Romanian hypnotist Triaian Boyer. By 1968, they had divorced. After the divorce, she married Jay Riviere, a golf course designer. They had one child, a daughter, Nancy, but ultimately divorced. Ames has resided in Houston, Texas since 1972. She and her third husband Danny Ward are the co-founders of Ward & Ames Special Events.

== Career ==
Ames serenading President Gerald R. Ford and First Lady Betty Ford in 1975.

A folk singer with a partially Spanish language repertoire, Ames was signed to Liberty Records. The A side of her first single was entitled "Bonsoir Cher, ("Goodnight Dear") and the B side was "Cucurrucucú paloma". She appeared on nine episodes of That Was the Week That Was in 1964. On January 26, 1965 Ames appeared on episode three of the NBC musical variety series, Hullabaloo, singing, "When the Good Lord Calls You Home", "Hey, Good Lookin'" and "I'm So Lonesome I Could Cry." and "I Can't Help It (If I'm Still in Love with You)" in a medley duet with George Hamilton, as well as "The Name Game" led by Shirley Ellis. She appeared on The Ed Sullivan Show in the mid 1960s, performing her mixed-language version of The Beatles "Yesterday".

She first broke the Billboard Hot 100 in 1966 with the single "He Wore the Green Beret" (by Frank Catana and Peg Barsella), backed by "War Is a Card Game" (by Pamela Polland), side B. These were her answer songs to Staff Sgt. Barry Sadler's "Ballad of the Green Berets". "He Wore the Green Beret" hit number 89. Later in the year, "Cry Softly" also placed in the charts at number 95, while doing better on the Easy Listening survey, climbing to number 18.

Ames had occasional TV acting appearances. She played two different characters in sketches on The Red Skelton Hour in 1966 and 1967; the latter role was in a hippie-themed sketch. Also in 1968 Ames had an acting appearance as "Louise Hahn" in a first season episode of The Name of the Game, an NBC drama. She made a cameo appearance on Laugh-In in 1968, season 1, episode 5.

She is listed as the co-writer of the theme song to The Smothers Brothers Comedy Hour with Mason Williams per Williams' own 1969 LP entitled Music by Mason Williams. Ames and Williams also co-wrote "Cinderella Rockefella", an international pop hit, in 1968.

Ames later had her own TV show which aired on KPRC-TV Channel 2 (the Houston area NBC affiliate) from 1972 to 1977.

In the late 1970s, Ames moved to Houston, Texas. In 1982 she and her third husband, Danny Ward, founded Ward & Ames, an events and video-production firm. Ames is also the co-founder of the Plumeria Society of America, and owned the jewelry company Alfaro, A Nancy Ames Collection.

== US discography ==
Studio albums

- The Incredible Nancy Ames (1963)
- A Portrait of Nancy (1963)
- I Will Never Marry (1963)
- This is the Girl That is (1964)
- Let It Be Me (1965)
- As Time Goes By (1965)
- Latin Pulse (1966)
- Spiced With Brasil (1967)
