= Another Lonely Song (album) =

Studio album by Tammy Wynette
- Released: March 18, 1974
- Recorded: August – October 1973
- Studio: Columbia (Nashville, Tennessee)
- Genre: Country
- Length: 29:14
- Label: Epic
- Producer: Billy Sherrill

Tammy Wynette chronology
We're Gonna Hold On (1973)	Another Lonely Song (1974)	Woman to Woman (1974)

Singles from Another Lonely Song
- 1. "Another Lonely Song" Released: December 7, 1973

Professional ratings
Review scores
Source	Rating
Allmusic	3/5 stars

Another Lonely Song is the twelfth studio album by American country music singer-songwriter Tammy Wynette. It was released on March 18, 1974, by Epic Records.

== Commercial performance ==
The album peaked at No. 8 on the Billboard Country Albums chart. The album's only single, "Another Lonely Song", peaked at No. 1 on the Billboard Country Singles chart.

== Track listing ==
Side one
No.	Title	Writer(s)	Length
1.	"Another Lonely Song"	Billy Sherrill, Norro Wilson, Tammy Wynette	2:37
2.	"Crying Steel Guitar"	Agnes Wilson, Sherrill, Carmol Taylor	3:00
3.	"What My Thoughts Do All the Time"	Jeanne Pruett	2:19
4.	"Stayin' Home Woman"	Earl Montgomery	2:16
5.	"Satin Sheets"	John E. Volinkaty	2:54

Side two
No.	Title	Writer(s)	Length
1.	"Homecoming"	Sherrill, Wilson	2:25
2.	"Help Me Make It Through the Night"	Kris Kristofferson	2:42
3.	"Keep Me in Mind"	George Richey, Glenn Sutton	3:05
4.	"Oh, How I Miss Him"	Taylor, Emily Mitchell, Wilson	2:13
5.	"With Child"	Montgomery, Janette Tidwell	2:55
6.	"One Final Stand"	Taylor, Richey, Wilson	2:48

== Personnel ==
Adapted from the album liner notes.

- Bill Barnes - cover design
- Lou Bradley - engineer
- The Jordanaires - backing vocals
- Cam Mullins - string arrangements
- The Nashville Edition - backing vocals
- Ron Reynolds - engineer
- Billy Sherrill - producer
- Bergen White - string arrangements
- Tammy Wynette - lead vocals

== Chart positions ==
=== Album ===
Year	Chart	Peak position
1974	Country Albums (Billboard)	8

=== Singles ===
Year	Single	Chart	Peak position
1973	"Another Lonely Song"	Country Singles (Billboard)	1
