= I'm Not Through Loving You Yet (album) =

Studio album by Conway Twitty
- Released: 1974
- Recorded: 1973–1974
- Genre: Country

Conway Twitty chronology
Honky Tonk Angel (1974)	I'm Not Through Loving You Yet (1974)	Linda on My Mind (1975)

I'm Not Through Loving You Yet is the thirty-first studio album by American country music artist Conway Twitty.

== Track listing ==
No.	Title	Writer(s)	Length
1.	"I'm Not Through Loving You Yet"	Conway Twitty, L. E. White	2:36
2.	"Pure Love"	Eddie Rabbitt	2:30
3.	"We've Already Tasted Love"	Bobby Harden	1:55
4.	"She's Just Not Over You Yet"	Twitty, White	3:04
5.	"I Come Here to Let Her Memory Wander Through My Mind"	Twitty, Joe E. Lewis	2:31
6.	"I Changed My Mind"	Twitty	2:57
7.	"I See the Want To in Your Eyes"	Wayne Carson	2:47
8.	"She Fights That Lovin' Feeling"	Jack Adams	2:57
9.	"Before Your Time"	Twitty, Markham	2:37
10.	"That's Asking Too Much of the Wine"	Jollie Hollie	3:25
11.	"Your Leaving Left Me Still Loving You"	White	2:44
