= Honeymoon Feelin' =

Single by Roy Clark

from the album Roy Clark / The Entertainer
- B-side: "I Really Don't Want to Know"
- Released: February 1974
- Recorded: November 1973
- Genre: Country
- Label: Dot
- Songwriter(s): Ron Hellard: Gary S. Paxton
- Producer(s): Joe Allison

Roy Clark singles chronology
"Somewhere Between Love and Tomorrow" (1973)	"Honeymoon Feelin'" (1974)	"The Great Divide" (1974)

"Honeymoon Feelin'" is a single by American country music artist Roy Clark. Released in February 1974, it was the first single from his album Roy Clark / The Entertainer. The song peaked at number 4 on the Billboard Hot Country Singles chart. It also reached number 1 on the RPM Country Tracks chart in Canada.

== Chart performance ==
Chart (1974)	Peak position
U.S. Billboard Hot Country Singles	4
Canadian RPM Country Tracks	1
