= Things Aren't Funny Anymore =

Single by Merle Haggard and The Strangers

from the album Merle Haggard Presents His 30th Album
- B-side: "Honky Tonk Night Time Man"
- Released: February 11, 1974
- Genre: Country
- Length: 2:43
- Label: Capitol
- Songwriter(s): Merle Haggard
- Producer(s): Ken Nelson; Fuzzy Owen

Merle Haggard and The Strangers singles chronology
"If We Make It Through December" (1973)	"Things Aren't Funny Anymore" (1974)	"Old Man from the Mountain" (1974)

"Things Aren't Funny Anymore" is a song written and recorded by American country music artist Merle Haggard and The Strangers. It was released in February 1974 as the first single from the album Merle Haggard Presents His 30th Album. The song was Merle Haggard and The Strangers seventeenth number one on the country charts. The single stayed at number one for a single week and spent ten weeks on the country chart.

== Chart performance ==
Chart (1974)	Peak position
US Hot Country Songs (Billboard)	1
Canadian RPM Country Tracks	2
