= A Field of Yellow Daisies =

Single by Charlie Rich

from the album Fully Realized
- B-side: "Party Girl"
- Released: 1974
- Genre: Country
- Label: Mercury
- Songwriter(s): Margaret Ann Rich
- Producer(s): Jerry Kennedy

Charlie Rich singles chronology
| "I Don't See Me in Your Eyes Anymore" (1974) | "A Field of Yellow Daisies" (1974) | "I Love My Friend" (1974) |

Audio
- "A Field of Yellow Daisies" on YouTube

"A Field of Yellow Daisies" is a song by American country singer Charlie Rich, written for him by his wife Margaret Ann.

It was included on his 1974 Mercury compilation album Fully Realized and subsequently released as single off it, peaking at number 23 on Billboard's country chart for the week of August 10.

It also appears on Rich's that year's studio album Very Special Love Songs released on Epic Records and dedicated to his wife.

== Critical reception ==
In June 1974, Billboard included the single on his list of "Top Single Picks", describing the song as "a beautiful ballad" that "has all of the Rich style and class".

== Charts ==
| Chart (1974) | Peak position |
|---|---|
| Canada (RPM Country Playlist) | 16 |
| US Hot Country Songs (Billboard) | 23 |
