= Another Lonely Song =

Single by Tammy Wynette

from the album Another Lonely Song
- B-side: "Only Time I'm Really Me"
- Released: December 1973
- Genre: Country
- Length: 2:37
- Label: Epic
- Songwriters: Tammy Wynette, Billy Sherrill, Norro Wilson
- Producer: Billy Sherrill

Tammy Wynette singles chronology
| "One Final Stand" (1973) | "Another Lonely Song" (1973) | "Woman to Woman" (1974) |

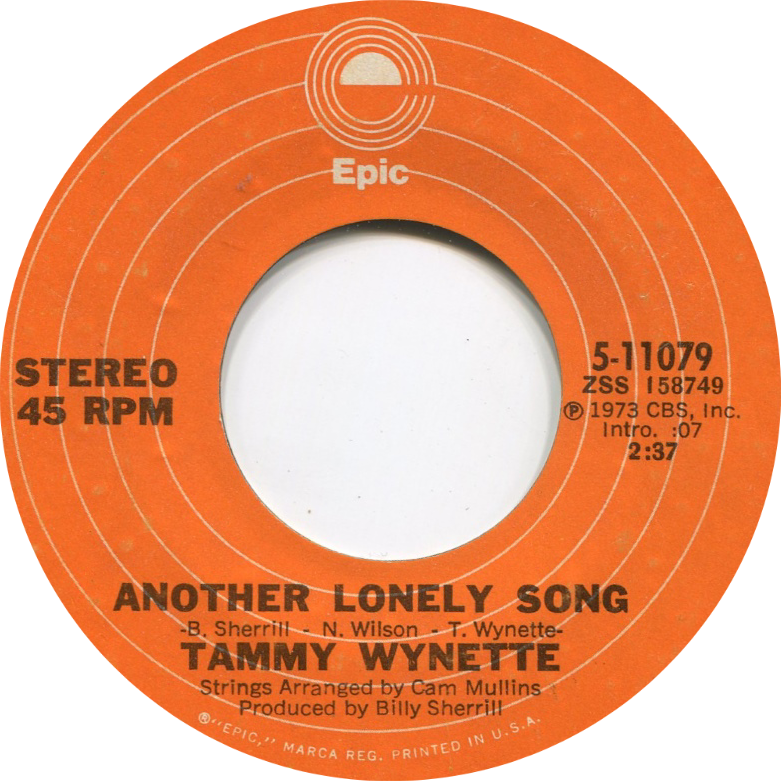

"Another Lonely Song" is a song recorded by American country music artist Tammy Wynette, who co-wrote the song with Billy Sherrill and Norro Wilson. It was released in December 1973 as the second single and title track from the album Another Lonely Song. The song was Wynette's fourteenth number-one solo hit on the country chart. The single stayed at number one for two weeks and spent a total of twelve weeks on the chart.

== Chart performance ==
| Chart (1973–1974) | Peak position |
|---|---|
| US Hot Country Songs (Billboard) | 1 |
| Canadian RPM Country Tracks | 1 |

== Cover versions ==
Andy Williams released a version of the song in 1974 that reached #29 on the adult contemporary chart.
