= Old Man from the Mountain =

Single by Merle Haggard and The Strangers

from the album Merle Haggard Presents His 30th Album
- B-side: "Holding Things Together"
- Released: June 3, 1974
- Genre: Country; western swing
- Length: 2:22
- Label: Capitol 3900
- Songwriter(s): Merle Haggard
- Producer(s): Fuzzy Owen

Merle Haggard and The Strangers singles chronology
"Things Aren't Funny Anymore" (1974)	"Old Man from the Mountain" (1974)	"Kentucky Gambler" (1974)

"Old Man from the Mountain" is a song written and recorded by American country music artist Merle Haggard and The Strangers. It was released in June 1974 as the second single from the album Merle Haggard Presents His 30th Album. It was Haggard and The Strangers eighteenth number one on the country singles chart. The single went to number one for a single week and spent a total of ten weeks on the chart.

== Chart performance ==
Chart (1974)	Peak position
US Hot Country Songs (Billboard)	1
Canadian RPM Country Tracks	1
