= Marie Laveau (song) =

Single by Bobby Bare

from the album Bobby Bare Sings Lullabys, Legends and Lies
- B-side: "The Mermaid"
- Released: April 1974
- Genre: Country
- Length: 3:09
- Label: RCA Nashville
- Songwriters: Shel Silverstein, Baxter Taylor
- Producer: Bobby Bare

Bobby Bare singles chronology
"Daddy, What If" (1974)	"Marie Laveau" (1974)	"Where'd I Come From" (1974)

"Marie Laveau" is a song written by Shel Silverstein and Baxter Taylor. First recorded by Dr. Hook & the Medicine Show on their 1972 album Doctor Hook, a 1974 live recording by Bobby Bare went to number one for a single week and spent a total of 18 weeks on the country charts. It was his 34th single on the charts, his only number-one and final top-10 country hit.

The song is about a fictitious and ugly witch who lives in the Louisiana bayous in a hollow log with a one-eyed snake and a three-legged dog, having the same name as the famous New Orleans voodoo priestess, and who, armed with a magic black cat tooth and mojo bone, can make men disappear with a horrific screech. On the night of a new moon, "Handsome Jack" arrives and offers her a deal; if she conjures up $1,000,000 for him, he will marry her. After he receives the money, he backs out of the deal, claiming that she is too ugly for a rich man like him; in retaliation, she screeches, and Jack disappears. The song concludes with the singer cautioning any listening man that should he ever encounter Marie and receive an offer of marriage, to accept it and live with her in the swamp for the rest of his life, or run the risk of being vanished.

Other recorded versions are by Girl Trouble on their album Thrillsphere (1990) and The Blue Dogs on Music for Dog People (1991).

== Chart performance ==
Chart (1974)	Peak position
U.S. Billboard Hot Country Singles	1
Canadian RPM Country Tracks	1
