= I'm Not Through Loving You Yet (Conway Twitty song) =

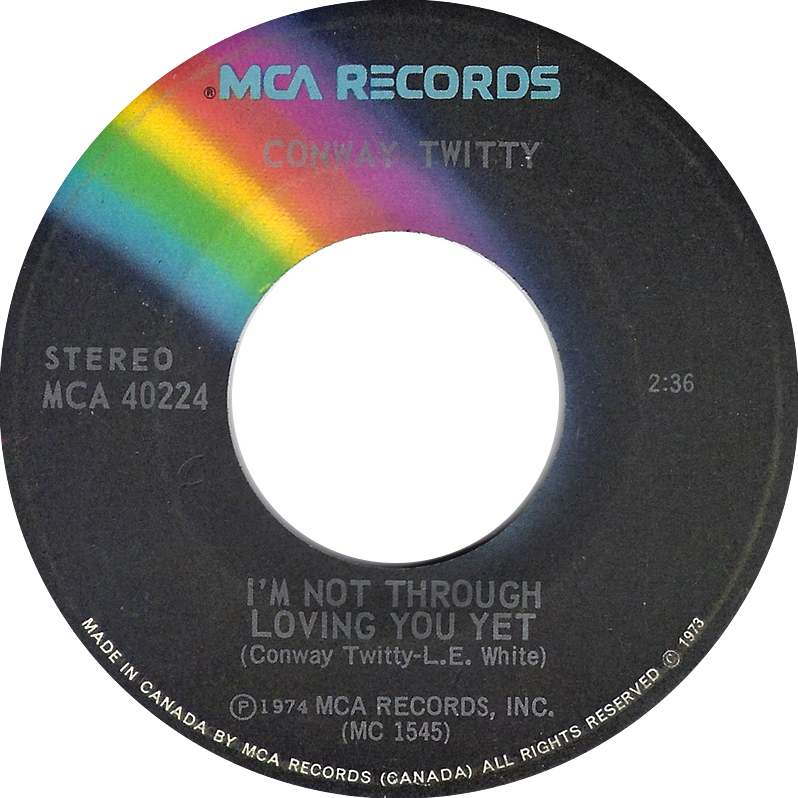
- A-side label of the Canadian single release

Single by Conway Twitty

from the album I'm Not Through Loving You Yet
- B-side: "Before Your Time"
- Released: April 1974
- Recorded: April 4, 1973
- Studio: Bradley's Barn, Mount Juliet, Tennessee
- Genre: Country
- Label: MCA
- Songwriter(s): Conway Twitty; L. E. White
- Producer(s): Owen Bradley

Conway Twitty singles chronology
"There's a Honky Tonk Angel (Who'll Take Me Back In)" (1974)	"I'm Not Through Loving You Yet" (1974)	"I See the Want To in Your Eyes" (1974)

"I'm Not Through Loving You Yet" is a song co-written and recorded by American country music artist Conway Twitty. It was released in April 1974 as the first single and title track from his album I'm Not Through Loving Yet. The song peaked at number 3 on the Billboard Hot Country Singles chart. It also reached number 1 on the RPM Country Tracks chart in Canada. The song was written by Twitty and L. E. White.

A 1980 cover by Pam Rose also made the country charts, reaching No. 60 that year.

== Personnel ==
Carol Lee Cooper and L.E. White overdubbed their vocals November 6, 1973, at Bradley's Barn.

- Conway Twitty — vocals
- Carol Lee Cooper, L.E. White — vocals
- Harold Bradley — 6-string electric bass guitar
- Ray Edenton — acoustic guitar
- Johnny Gimble — fiddle
- John Hughey — steel guitar
- Tommy Markham — drums
- Grady Martin — electric guitar
- Bob Moore — bass
- Hargus "Pig" Robbins — piano

== Chart performance ==
Chart (1974)	Peak position
US Hot Country Songs (Billboard)	3
Canadian RPM Country Tracks	1
