= I Don't See Me in Your Eyes Anymore =

1949 popular song

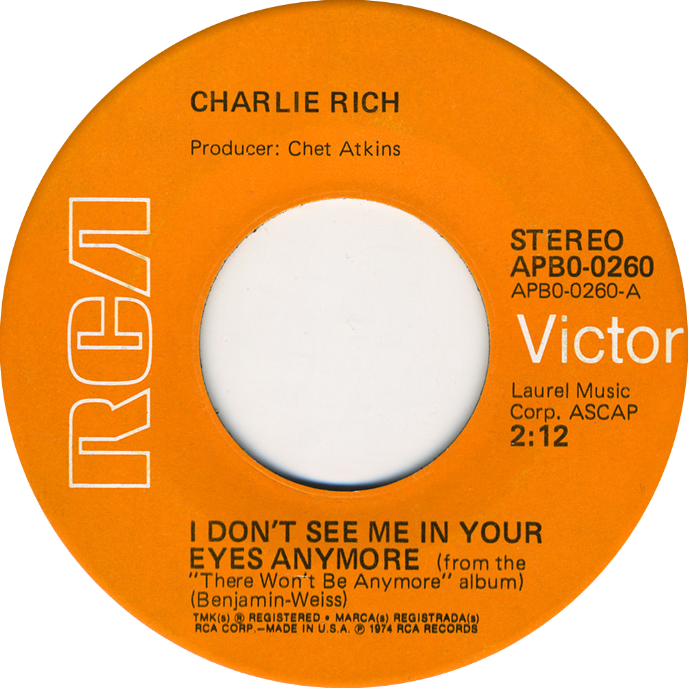

Single by Charlie Rich

from the album There Won't Be Anymore
- B-side: "No Room to Dance"
- Released: April 1974 (U.S.)
- Recorded: c. mid-1960s
- Genre: Country
- Length: 2:14
- Label: RCA
- Songwriters: Bennie Benjamin, George David Weiss
- Producer: Chet Atkins

Charlie Rich singles chronology
"A Very Special Love Song" (1974)	"I Don't See Me in Your Eyes Anymore" (1974)	"A Field of Yellow Daisies" (1974)

"I Don't See Me in Your Eyes Anymore" is a popular song, written by Bennie Benjamin and George David Weiss and published in 1949. The song was popularized that year by Gordon Jenkins and His Orchestra (vocals by the Stardusters) and by Perry Como.

== Commercial performance ==
=== Gordon Jenkins ===
The recording by Gordon Jenkins was released by Decca Records as catalog number 24576 and first reached the Billboard charts on March 25, 1949 and lasted 21 weeks on the chart, peaking at No. 6.

=== Perry Como ===
The recording by Perry Como was released by RCA Victor Records as catalog numbers 20-3347 (78 rpm) and 47-2892 (45 rpm). It was the flip side of "Forever and Ever". It first reached the Billboard charts on May 6, 1949 and lasted 15 weeks on the chart, peaking at No. 11.

=== Charlie Rich ===
The song received renewed popularity in 1974, when country singer Charlie Rich released a cover version he had recorded during the mid-1960s. Rich's version came about during his stint at RCA's rhythm and blues subsidiary, Groove Records, and association with producer Chet Atkins, one of the architects of the Nashville Sound. Like many of Atkins-produced songs of the era, "I Don't See Me ..." featured choral backing and strings, a style prominent on other Rich recordings of the time. Allmusic reviewer Stephen Cook said that Rich's musical style "landed somewhere between the raw sound of his Sun hits ... and the pop crossover tone of his Epic smashes."

Rich's rendition reached No. 1 on the Billboard Hot Country Singles chart in June 1974. It was his fifth No. 1 song overall and his third number one in the first six months of 1974 alone. The song also crossed over to the Billboard Hot 100 survey, peaking at No. 47, and to the Easy Listening chart, where it peaked at No. 9.

Although recorded in the mid-1960s, "I Don't See Me ..." was never released as a single. Then, in 1973, Rich had million-selling hits with "Behind Closed Doors" and "The Most Beautiful Girl", and it was not long before several of his older recordings made during his tenures at RCA, Mercury and Sun records — "I Don't See Me ..." included — were released as singles to country radio.

==== Charts ====
Chart (1974)	Peak position
U.S. Billboard Hot 100	47
U.S. Billboard Hot Country Singles	1
U.S. Billboard Easy Listening	9

== Other versions ==
Other recordings were made by Helen Forrest (on January 24, 1949, released by MGM Records as catalog number 10373), Buddy Clark (on January 4, 1949, released by Columbia Records as catalog number 38408), Kitty Kallen (as the B-side of "Kiss Me Sweet", 1949, released by Mercury Records as catalog number 5265), and in the United Kingdom by Vera Lynn and Sam Browne (on February 5, 1949, released by Decca Records as catalog number F 9127). The song hit No. 1 on the British sheet music charts (no record charts were published until 1952). Ernestine Anderson (as the B-side of "Be Mine" on Mercury Records as catalog number 45286 in Australia) and Carl Perkins (on Columbia Records) also released versions of the song in 1959. The song was featured on the Fun Lovin' Criminals track "There Was a Time" from their 2001 album Loco. Ringo Starr released a recording on his 2026 album Long Long Road.
