= There's a Honky Tonk Angel (Who'll Take Me Back In) =

1974 single by Conway Twitty

Single by Conway Twitty

from the album Honky Tonk Angel
- B-side: "Don't It Let Go To Your Heart"
- Released: January 1974
- Recorded: October 29, 1973
- Studio: Bradley's Barn, Mount Juliet, Tennessee
- Genre: Country
- Length: 2:57
- Label: MCA
- Songwriters: Troy Seals; Denny Rice
- Producer: Owen Bradley

Conway Twitty singles chronology
"You've Never Been This Far Before" (1973)	"There's a Honky Tonk Angel (Who'll Take Me Back In)" (1974)	"I'm Not Through Loving You Yet" (1974)

"There's a Honky Tonk Angel (Who'll Take Me Back In)" is a song best known for the 1974 recording by American country music artist Conway Twitty, who took it to number 1 on the Hot Country Singles chart. The song was written by Troy Seals and Denny Rice and originally released on Troy Seals' 1973 debut album Now Presenting Troy Seals.

== Conway Twitty version ==
Twitty's version was released in January 1974 as the first single from the album Honky Tonk Angel. The song was Twitty's 10th number one on the U.S. country singles chart as a solo artist and 13th overall. It stayed at number one for one week and spent 12 weeks on the chart in all.

=== Personnel ===
- Conway Twitty – vocals
- The Nashville Sounds – vocals
- Harold Bradley – 6-string electric bass guitar
- Ray Edenton – acoustic guitar
- Johnny Gimble – fiddle
- John Hughey – steel guitar
- Tommy Markham – drums
- Grady Martin – electric guitar
- Bob Moore – bass
- Hargus "Pig" Robbins – piano

=== Chart performance ===
Chart (1974)	Peak position
US Hot Country Songs (Billboard)	1
Canadian RPM Country Tracks	1

== Cliff Richard version ==
"Honky Tonk Angel"
- Cover of the German release

Single by Cliff Richard
- B-side: "(Wouldn't You Know It) Got Myself a Girl"
- Released: 5 September 1975
- Recorded: 20 June 1974
- Studio: Morgan Studios, London
- Genre: Country
- Length: 3:03
- Label: EMI
- Songwriters: Troy Seals; Denny Rice
- Producers: Bruce Welch; Hank Marvin; John Farrar

Cliff Richard singles chronology
"It's Only Me You Left Behind" (1975)	"Honky Tonk Angel" (1975)	"Miss You Nights" (1975)

In 1974, Bruce Welch, who had previously worked with Richard as part of the Shadows and who would go on to produce several of his subsequent albums, heard the song and thought that it would make a good "comeback" single after disappointing chart performances during the previous two years. A version was arranged for Richard by John Farrar with a string arrangement by Nick Ingman, and recorded on 20 June 1974. The single was released in September 1975 with the B-side "(Wouldn't You Know It) Got Myself a Girl", written by Alan Tarney and Trevor Spencer.

While recording the song, Richard incorrectly assumed that the song was about a Chinese lady from Hong Kong (a.k.a. a "Honky"), unaware that the phrase "honky-tonk angel" was an American slang term for a prostitute. Some of his fans and friends were aware of the song's actual meaning, and expressed surprise that he had chosen to cover the song, given his Christian beliefs. By the time Richard was made aware of his mistake, the single had been on sale for a short time in the UK, Europe, and Japan, and he had already made multiple television appearances to promote it. He decided to make a televised announcement which called for EMI to withdraw the record, and declared that he would be refusing to promote it any further. Even though the single was expected to perform well, EMI eventually agreed to withdraw the single at his request.

In the decades since its withdrawal, "Honky Tonk Angel" has appeared as a bonus track on the 2001 CD reissue of I'm Nearly Famous, and on the 2002 compilation The Singles Collection. An alternate take from the same recording session appears on 2009's Lost & Found (From the Archives).

=== Track listing ===
7": EMI / EMI 2344

1. "Honky Tonk Angel" – 3:03
2. "(Wouldn't You Know It) Got Myself a Girl" – 3:03

=== Personnel ===
- Cliff Richard – vocals, backing vocals
- Terry Britten – guitar, backing vocals
- Alan Tarney – bass guitar, backing vocals
- Dave MacRae – piano
- Trevor Spencer – drums
- Nick Ingman Orchestra – orchestra

=== Charts ===
Despite only a thousand copies being sold, "Honky Tonk Angel" did in fact chart in the UK. It peaked at number five on the "Star Breakers" list, which was an officially-published BMRB list of the most popular records in the UK outside of the Top 50. It entered the chart during the final week of September and spent a total of five weeks on the list before the single was ultimately withdrawn.

Chart (1975)	Peak position
UK Singles (BMRB)	55

== Elvis Presley version ==
"There's a Honky Tonk Angel (Who'll Take Me Back In)"
- Cover with the track titles flipped

Single by Elvis Presley
- A-side: "I Got a Feelin' in My Body"
- Released: July 1979
- Recorded: 15 December 1973
- Studio: Stax
- Genre: Country
- Length: 3:02
- Label: RCA
- Songwriters: Troy Seals; Denny Rice
- Producers: Felton Jarvis (original); Joan Deary (reissue)

Elvis Presley singles chronology
"Are You Sincere" (1978)	"There's a Honky Tonk Angel (Who'll Take Me Back In)" (1979)	""It Won't Seem Like Christmas (Without You)" (UK release)" (1979)

Elvis Presley covered the track in 1975 and first released it on his Promised Land album, however it was released as the B-side of the posthumous single "I Got a Feelin' in My Body": a posthumous single in 1979, which peaked at number 6 on the Hot Country Singles chart. Along the way, the song titles on the cover sleeve were reversed accordingly. The track was recorded at Stax Records, 15 December 1973.

== Other cover versions ==
- A cover by Dobie Gray is on his 1973 album Loving Arms.
