= This Time (Waylon Jennings song) =

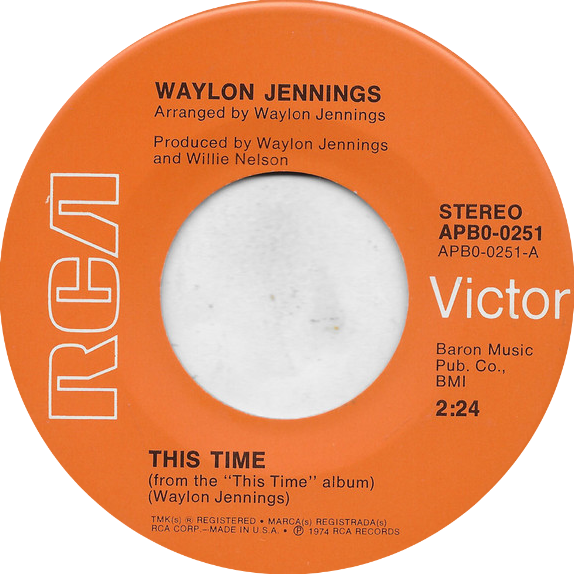
- A-side label of the US single release vinyl

Single by Waylon Jennings

from the album This Time
- B-side: "Mona"
- Released: April 1974 (U.S.)
- Recorded: October 1973
- Genre: Country
- Length: 2:26
- Label: RCA Victor
- Songwriter: Waylon Jennings
- Producers: Waylon Jennings, Willie Nelson

Waylon Jennings singles chronology
"You Ask Me To" (1973)	"This Time" (1974)	"I'm a Ramblin' Man" (1974)

"This Time" is a song written and recorded by American country music artist Waylon Jennings. It is the title track from the album This Time and was released in April 1974 as the album's first single. The song reached No. 1 on the Billboard Hot Country Singles chart in June 1974 and was his first of 16 country No. 1 hits.

== Chart performance ==
Chart (1974)	Peak position
US Hot Country Songs (Billboard)	1
Canadian RPM Country Tracks	1
