= I See the Want To in Your Eyes =

Single by Conway Twitty

from the album I'm Not Through Loving You Yet
- B-side: "Girl from Tupelo"
- Released: July 29, 1974
- Recorded: May 30, 1974
- Studio: Bradley's Barn, Mount Juliet, Tennessee
- Genre: Country
- Length: 2:52
- Label: MCA
- Songwriter(s): Wayne Carson
- Producer(s): Owen Bradley

Conway Twitty singles chronology
"I'm Not Through Loving You Yet" (1974)	"I See the Want To in Your Eyes" (1974)	"Linda on My Mind" (1975)

"I See the Want To in Your Eyes" is a song written by Wayne Carson. The song was first recorded by honky-tonk singer Gary Stewart and appeared on his 1975 album Out of Hand. American country music artist Conway Twitty heard Stewart's version on the radio and decided to record it. Twitty's version was released in July 1974 as the second single from the album I'm Not Through Loving You Yet. The song was Twitty's 11th number one on the country chart. The single stayed at number one for two weeks and spent a total of 13 weeks on the chart.

== Popular culture ==
A filmed performance of Twitty on That Good Ole Nashville Music singing the song was featured in "The Juice Is Loose", an episode of Family Guy. The song was aired in its entirety.

== Personnel ==
- Conway Twitty — vocals
- Harold Bradley — 6-string electric bass guitar
- Ray Edenton — acoustic guitar
- John Hughey — steel guitar
- Tommy "Porkchop" Markham — drums
- Grady Martin — electric guitar
- Bob Moore — bass
- Hargus "Pig" Robbins — piano

== Chart performance ==
Chart (1974)	Peak position
US Hot Country Songs (Billboard)	1
Canadian RPM Country Tracks	1
