= There Won't Be Anymore =

Single by Charlie Rich

from the album There Won't Be Anymore
- B-side: "Gentleman Jim" (1965); "It's All Over Now" (1973)
- Released: 1965 and again December 1973
- Recorded: February 5, 1965
- Genre: Country
- Length: 2:24
- Label: RCA
- Songwriter: Charlie Rich
- Producer: Chet Atkins

Charlie Rich singles chronology
"The Most Beautiful Girl" (1973)	"There Won't Be Anymore" (1965)	"A Very Special Love Song" (1974)

"There Won't Be Anymore" is a song written and recorded by Charlie Rich. It was first released as a single in 1965 and again at the end of 1973, and was his fourth No. 1 hit on the Billboard Hot Country Singles chart in March 1974, and a top 20 pop hit as well.

== Song background ==
Rich's version was recorded during his stint at RCA's rhythm and blues subsidiary, Groove Records, and his association with producer Chet Atkins, one of the architects of the Nashville Sound. Like many of Atkins-produced songs of the era, "There Won't Be Anymore" featured choral backing and strings, a style prominent on other Rich recordings of the time. The song also featured a saxophone solo at the introduction and again during mid-song bridge. Allmusic reviewer Stephen Cook said that Rich's musical style "landed somewhere between the raw sound of his Sun hits ... and the pop crossover tone of his Epic smashes."

Having been recorded in 1964, "There Won't Be Anymore" was first released as a single in 1965 but didn't chart then. It was released a second time in 1973, after Rich had million-selling hits on Epic with "Behind Closed Doors" and "The Most Beautiful Girl." Rich's chart success led the labels that owned his older recordings—RCA, Mercury and Sun—to look for potential hits among the Rich tracks in their vaults. One of the first such songs to be released as a single was "There Won't Be Anymore." An earlier blues version of "There Won't Be Anymore" was recorded at Sun by Rich in the late 1950s/early 1960s.

Issued in December 1973, at the time his Epic single "The Most Beautiful Girl" was peaking in popularity, "There Won't Be Anymore" quickly became Rich's fourth #1 song overall, and the first of his five chart-toppers during 1974.

The B-side of the 1973 release of "There Won't Be Anymore" was called "It's All Over Now," not to be confused with the Bobby Womack-Shirley Womack penned song It's All Over Now, recorded by The Valentinos and The Rolling Stones.

== Chart performance ==
"There Won't Be Anymore" enjoyed a two-week reign atop the Hot Country Singles chart in March 1974 (as part of a 14-week run inside that chart's top 40). The song also enjoyed modest success on pop radio stations, peaking at No. 18 on the Billboard Hot 100.

One of Rich's biggest successes, "There Won't Be Anymore" was named the top country hit of 1974 by Billboard magazine.

== Chart history ==
Chart (1973–74)	Peak position
Australia (Kent Music Report)	32
Canadian RPM Country Tracks	1
Canadian RPM Top Singles	17
Canadian RPM Adult Contemporary Tracks	33
South Africa (Springbok Radio)	5
U.S. Billboard Hot Country Singles	1
U.S. Billboard Hot 100	18
U.S. Billboard Hot Adult Contemporary Tracks	15
