= I Love My Friend =

Single by Charlie Rich

from the album The Silver Fox
- B-side: "Why Oh Why"
- Released: July 12, 1974
- Studio: Columbia (Nashville, Tennessee)
- Genre: Country
- Label: Epic
- Songwriter(s): Billy Sherrill; Norro Wilson
- Producer(s): Billy Sherrill

Charlie Rich singles chronology
"A Field of Yellow Daisies" (1974)	"I Love My Friend" (1974)	"She Called Me Baby" (1974)

"I Love My Friend" is a 1974 single written by Billy Sherrill and Norro Wilson and recorded by Charlie Rich. "I Love My Friend" was Rich's sixth number one on the country chart. The single remained at number one for one week and spent a total of ten weeks on the chart. "I Love My Friend" peaked at number 24 on the Billboard Hot 100 and reached number one on the Easy Listening chart.

== Chart performance ==
Chart (1974)	Peak position
Australia (Kent Music Report)	46
U.S. Billboard Hot Country Singles	1
U.S. Billboard Hot 100	24
U.S. Billboard Hot Adult Contemporary Tracks	1
Canadian RPM Country Tracks	1
Canadian RPM Top Singles	28
Canadian RPM Adult Contemporary Tracks	1

== Cover Versions ==
- Andy Williams included a version of the song in his album You Lay So Easy on My Mind (1974).
