= A Very Special Love Song =

Single by Charlie Rich

from the album Very Special Love Songs
- B-side: "I Can't Even Drink It Away"
- Released: January 1974
- Recorded: 1973
- Studio: Columbia (Nashville, Tennessee)
- Genre: Soft rock
- Length: 2:44
- Label: Epic
- Songwriters: Billy Sherrill; Norro Wilson
- Producer: Billy Sherrill

Charlie Rich singles chronology
"There Won't Be Anymore" (1974)	"A Very Special Love Song" (1974)	"I Don't See Me in Your Eyes Anymore" (1974)

"A Very Special Love Song" is the title of a 1974 song by country music singer Charlie Rich. The song was written by Billy Sherrill and Norro Wilson, songwriters who had also written Rich's 1973 hit, "The Most Beautiful Girl". The song is included on Rich's 1974 album, Very Special Love Songs.

== Reception ==
Released as the follow-up single to "The Most Beautiful Girl", "A Very Special Love Song" nearly reached the top ten on the Billboard Hot 100 chart in April 1974, peaking at #11. The song was able to top two other Billboard charts that year, as it spent three weeks atop the country music chart and two weeks at the summit on the adult contemporary chart. This was the second of four chart-toppers Rich achieved on the Billboard AC chart.

Songwriters Sherrill and Wilson won a Grammy Award for "A Very Special Love Song" in the category Best Country Song at the 1975 ceremony.

== Inspiration ==
French composer and pianist Michel Legrand's "The Summer Knows", the theme from the 1971 film Summer of '42, served as the musical inspiration for Rich's song. He was quoted by Billboard author Tom Roland as saying: "I don't think I stole from them all [sic], but that's my favorite theme of all time. There's not a similarity, and yet, you can understand what I was thinking about and where I was coming from."

== Chart performance ==
Chart (1974)	Peak position
Australia (Kent Music Report)	23
U.S. Billboard Hot 100	11
U.S. Billboard Hot Country Singles	1
U.S. Billboard Easy Listening	1
Canadian RPM Country Tracks	1
Canadian RPM Top Singles	4
Canadian RPM Adult Contemporary	2

== Cover versions ==
- Country music singer Barbara Mandrell recorded a version of this song in 1974; hers was included on her album This Time I Almost Made It.
- Another version of this song was released by Alexander Forrest in April 1976. Released on the Emerald label, cat# MD1185.
- Mexican pop singer Gualberto Castro recorded a cover version in Spanish as "Mi Bella Melodia".
