= She Called Me Baby =

1961 song by Harlan Howard

Single by Charlie Rich

from the album She Called Me Baby
- B-side: "Ten Dollars and a Clean White Shirt"
- Released: September 1974
- Recorded: 1964 or 1965
- Genre: Country
- Length: 2:27
- Label: RCA Records 10062
- Songwriter: Harlan Howard
- Producer: Chet Atkins

Charlie Rich singles chronology
| "I Love My Friend" (1974) | "She Called Me Baby" (1974) | "Something Just Came Over Me" (1975) |

"She Called Me Baby" is a country song written in 1961 by Harlan Howard.

== Background ==
The song was first recorded by Howard for his September 1961 album release Harlan Howard Sings Harlan Howard. The track was released as a single in January 1962 and became a breakout hit in Texas where, according to his widow Melanie Howard, Harlan Howard spent two weeks doing promotion before returning home to Nashville and refusing to do further promotion re his singing career as it interfered with his primary musical focus: songwriting.

== Charlie Rich Recording ==
Charlie Rich recorded "She Called Me Baby" at one of a series of sessions produced by Chet Atkins at RCA Victor Studio in Nashville which occurred between March 1964 and February 1965. Like many Atkins-produced tracks of this era, "She Called Me Baby" featured choral backing and strings, a style prominent on other Rich recordings of the time. Despite a number of recorded versions, "She Called Me Baby" did not appear in the Top 20 of the C&W chart in Billboard until 1974 when a mid-60s recording by Rich was belatedly released to reach No. 1 C&W.

Rich's version of "She Called Me Baby" went unreleased as an album cut or single until after Rich had his star breakout in 1973, when he scored million-sellers with "Behind Closed Doors" and "The Most Beautiful Girl." That run of success continued into 1974, when several of his older recordings made during his tenures at RCA, Mercury and Sun Records — "She Called Me Baby" included – were released as singles to C&W radio.

Released in September 1974 – around the time his Epic single "I Love My Friend" was peaking in popularity — "She Called Me Baby" reached No. 1 on the Billboard C&W chart dated December 7, 1974. "She Called Me Baby" was Rich's fifth No. 1 C&W hit in 1974 alone and his seventh No. 1 C&W hit overall.

== C&W versions ==
"He Called Me Baby"

Single by Patsy Cline

from the album That's How a Heartache Begins
- B-side: "Won't You Come Home Bill Bailey"
- Released: September 19 1964
- Recorded: February 7, 1963
- Genre: Country
- Length: 2:41
- Label: Decca 10062
- Songwriter: Harlan Howard
- Producer: Owen Bradley

Patsy Cline singles chronology
| "That's How a Heartache Begins" (1974) | "He Called Me Baby" (1964) | "Just a Closer Walk With Thee" (1965) |

Jan Howard – then married to Harlan Howard – recorded the first female version of the song: "He Called Me Baby" in an April 30, 1962, session at Columbia Recording Studio (Nashville); the track was featured on Jan Howard's Sweet and Sentimental album released that October.

Patsy Cline recorded the song as "He Called Me Baby" in a February 1963 session at Columbia Recording Studio (Nashville). Cline had begun recording tracks for an album to be entitled Faded Love on February 4, 1963; "He Called Me Baby" was one of four tracks cut on February 7, 1963 in what would prove to be Cline's final recording session. After Cline's death on March 5, 1963 Decca Records elected not to release the Faded Love album instead including Cline's final tracks on two 1964 album releases, the second of which: the November 2, 1964, release That's How a Heartache Begins, featured "He Called Me Baby" which track had been given single release that September 19, to reach #23 on the C&W charts in December 1964, becoming Cline's final C&W Top 40 hit until 1980.

Three months after Cline's "He Called Me Baby" ended its run in the C&W Top 50 Carl Smith brought "She Called Me Baby" onto that chart for the first time; Smith's version – cut December 14, 1964, at Columbia Recording Studio (Nashville) – rose as high as No. 32. "She Called Me Baby" next charted in November and December 1972 when Dick Curless took his version to No. 54 C&W.

The song has also been recorded – as "She Called Me Baby" – by Eddy Arnold, Bobby Bare, Glen Campbell, Tennessee Ernie Ford, Mickey Gilley, Ferlin Husky, Waylon Jennings, John D. Loudermilk, Ernest Tubb and Sheb Wooley; and as "He Called Me Baby" by Jessi Colter (A Country Star is Born), Skeeter Davis, Bobbi Martin, Melba Montgomery and Dinah Shore and Lee Ann Womack in 2017.

== R&B versions ==
"He Called Me Baby" entered the R&B charts for the first time in December 1968 via a recording by Ella Washington made for Nashville-based R&B label Sound Stage 7. Recorded at FAME Studios in Muscle Shoals, Washington's "He Called Me Baby" was only a moderate R&B hit (#38) but crossed-over to the Billboard Hot 100 (#77) and earned Washington a Grammy nomination for Best R&B Performance – Female.

In its female version, "He Called Me Baby", the song was a Top Ten R&B hit for Candi Staton in 1971. The track was includes in Staton's Stand By Your Man album and was cut at FAME Studios with studio owner Rick Hall producing – included a version of "He Called Me Baby" issued as a single concurrently with the album's release in December 1970. Staton's version of "He Called Me Baby" – which Harlan Howard's widow says the composer "loved" – reached No. 9 R&B in February 1971, and also crossed over to the Hot 100 peaking at No. 52.

Nancy Wilson remade "He Called Me Baby" for her 1975 album Come Get to This; released as a single the track reached No. 74 R&B.

== Chart performance ==
=== Patsy Cline ===
| Chart (1964) | Peak position |
|---|---|
| U.S. Billboard Hot Country Singles | 23 |

=== Carl Smith ===
| Chart (1965) | Peak position |
|---|---|
| U.S. Billboard Hot Country Singles | 32 |

=== Dick Curless ===
| Chart (1972) | Peak position |
|---|---|
| U.S. Billboard Hot Country Singles | 55 |

=== Charlie Rich ===
| Chart (1974) | Peak position |
|---|---|
| U.S. Billboard Hot Country Singles | 1 |
| U.S. Billboard Hot 100 | 47 |
| U.S. Billboard Easy Listening | 41 |
| Canadian RPM Country Tracks | 1 |
| Canadian RPM Top Singles | 88 |
| Canadian RPM Adult Contemporary | 35 |

== Samples ==
- Indie band One Eskimo sampled the Candi Staton version for their 2009 song "Kandi".
