= Merle Haggard discography =

Cataloging of published recordings by Merle Haggard

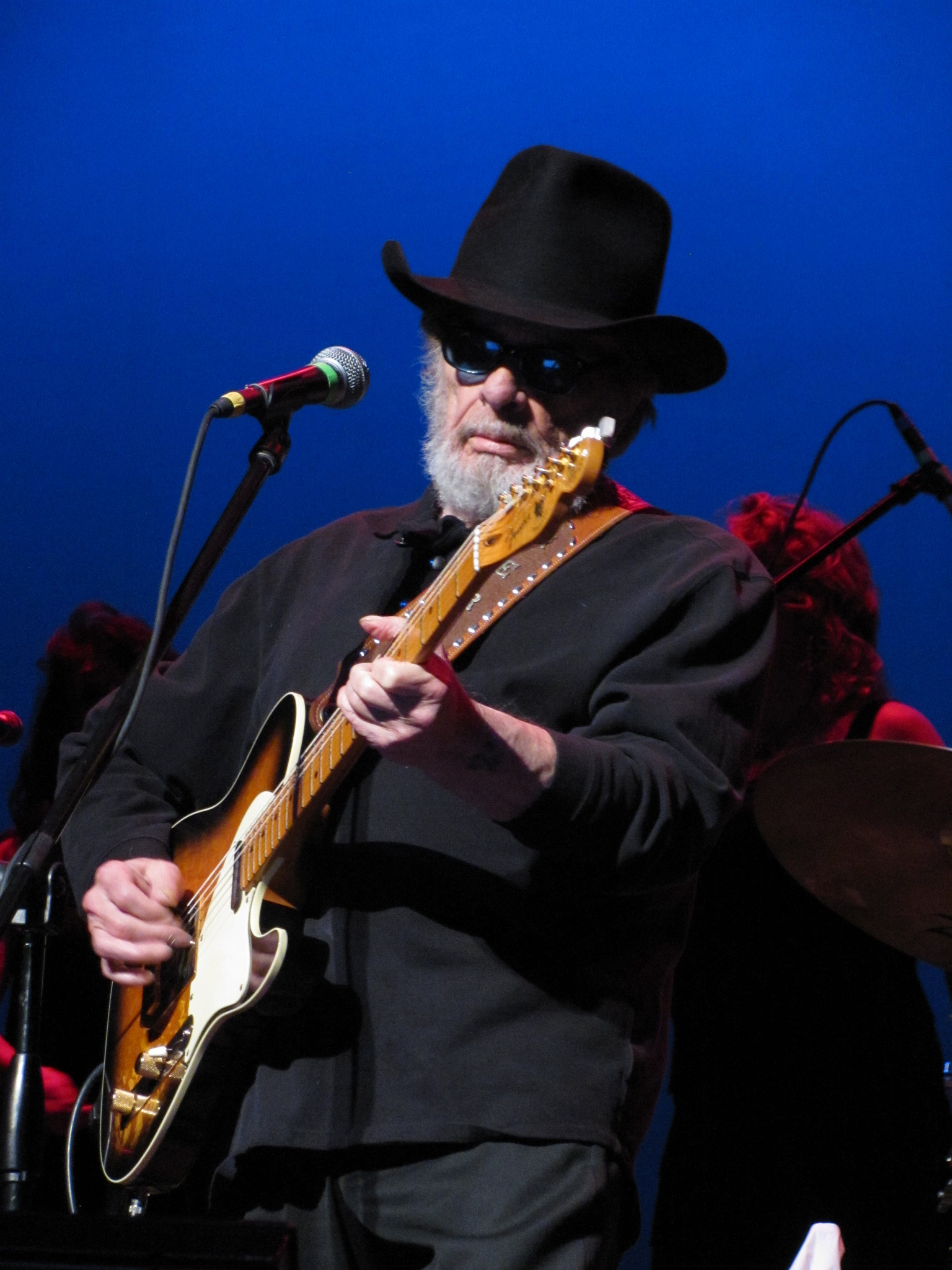
- Studio albums: 66
- Live albums: 8
- Compilation albums: 26
- Singles: 84
- Music videos: 13
- No.1 Single: 38

The discography for American country music singer Merle Haggard includes 66 studio albums, five instrumental albums featuring his backing band the Strangers, as well as several live and compilation albums. Haggard recorded for a variety of major and independent record labels through the years, with significant years spent with Capitol Records (where he lived for over a decade), MCA Records, Epic Records and Curb Records, as well as his own label Hag Records.

== Studio albums ==
=== 1960s ===
Title	Album details	Peak chart positions	
Title	Album details	US Country	US
Strangers	Release date: September 27, 1965; Label: Capitol	9	—
Just Between the Two of Us (with Bonnie Owens and the Strangers)	Release date: April 11, 1966; Label: Capitol	4	—
Swinging Doors and the Bottle Let Me Down (with the Strangers)	Release date: October 17, 1966; Label: Capitol	1	—
I'm a Lonesome Fugitive (with the Strangers)	Release date: April 3, 1967; Label: Capitol	3	165
Branded Man/I Threw Away the Rose (with the Strangers)	Release date: August 28, 1967; Label: Capitol	1	167
Sing Me Back Home (with the Strangers)	Release date: January 8, 1968; Label: Capitol	1	—
The Legend of Bonnie & Clyde (with the Strangers)	Release date: April 8, 1968; Label: Capitol	6	—
Mama Tried (with the Strangers)	Release date: September 9, 1968; Label: Capitol	4	—
Pride in What I Am (with the Strangers)	Release date: February 10, 1969; Label: Capitol	11	189
Same Train, a Different Time: Merle Haggard Sings the Great Songs of Jimmie Rodgers (with the Strangers)	Release date: May 12, 1969; Label: Capitol	1	67
A Portrait of Merle Haggard (with the Strangers)	Release date: September 15, 1969; Label: Capitol	3	99
"—" denotes releases that did not chart

=== 1970s ===
Title	Album details	Peak chart positions			
Title	Album details	US Country	US	CAN Country	CAN
A Tribute to the Best Damn Fiddle Player in the World (or, My Salute to Bob Wills) (with the Strangers)	Release date: November 16, 1970; Label: Capitol	2	58	—	—
Hag (with the Strangers)	Release date: March 15, 1971; Label: Capitol	1	66	—	63
Someday We'll Look Back (with the Strangers)	Release date: August 16, 1971; Label: Capitol	4	108	—	—
Let Me Tell You About a Song (with the Strangers)	Release date: March 6, 1972; Label: Capitol	7	166	—	—
It's Not Love (But It's Not Bad) (with the Strangers)	Release date: November 20, 1972; Label: Capitol	1	—	—	—
Merle Haggard's Christmas Present (Something Old, Something New)	Release date: November 1973; Label: Capitol	4	—	—	—
If We Make it Through December (with the Strangers)	Release date: February 18, 1974; Label: Capitol	4	190	—	—
Merle Haggard Presents His 30th Album (with the Strangers)	Release date: September 17, 1974; Label: Capitol	1	—	—	—
Keep Movin' On (with the Strangers)	Release date: April 21, 1975; Label: Capitol	1	129	—	—
It's All in the Movies (with the Strangers)	Release date: February 16, 1976; Label: Capitol	1	—	—	—
My Love Affair with Trains (with the Strangers)	Release date: July 5, 1976; Label: Capitol	7	—	—	—
The Roots of My Raising (with the Strangers)	Release date: November 22, 1976; Label: Capitol	8	—	—	—
Ramblin' Fever	Release date: May 9, 1977; Label: MCA	5	—	—	20
A Working Man Can't Get Nowhere Today (with the Strangers)	Release date: September 12, 1977; Label: Capitol	28	—	—	—
My Farewell to Elvis	Release date: October 24, 1977; Label: MCA	6	133	—	—
I'm Always on a Mountain When I Fall	Release date: June 26, 1978; Label: MCA	17	—	9	—
Serving 190 Proof	Release date: May 14, 1979; Label: MCA	17	—	1	—
"—" denotes releases that did not chart

=== 1980s ===
Title	Album details	Peak chart positions			Certifications (sales threshold)
Title	Album details	US Country	US	CAN Country	Certifications (sales threshold)
The Way I Am	Release date: April 1980; Label: MCA	16	—	—	
Back to the Barrooms	Release date: October 10, 1980; Label: MCA	8	—	—	
Songs for the Mama That Tried	Release date: September 28, 1981; Label: MCA	46	—	—	
Big City	Release date: October 5, 1981; Label: Epic	3	161	—	US: Gold
A Taste of Yesterday's Wine (with George Jones)	Release date: August 16, 1982; Label: Epic	4	123	—	
Going Where the Lonely Go	Release date: October 18, 1982; Label: Epic	3	—	—	
Goin' Home for Christmas	Release date: October 25, 1982; Label: Epic	41	—	—	
Pancho & Lefty (with Willie Nelson)	Release date: January 10, 1983; Label: Epic	1	37	—	CAN: Gold; US: Platinum
Heart to Heart (with Leona Williams)	Release date: June 16, 1983; Label: Mercury	44	—	—	
That's the Way Love Goes	Release date: August 15, 1983; Label: Epic	8	—	—	
It's All in the Game	Release date: May 14, 1984; Label: Epic	1	—	6	
Kern River	Release date: March 25, 1985; Label: Epic	8	—	—	
A Friend in California	Release date: March 10, 1986; Label: Epic	2	—	—	
Out Among the Stars	Release date: October 13, 1986; Label: Epic	15	—	—	
Seashores of Old Mexico (with Willie Nelson)	Release date: September 21, 1987; Label: Epic	31	—	—	
Chill Factor	Release date: November 23, 1987; Label: Epic	8	—	14	
5:01 Blues	Release date: June 27, 1989; Label: Epic	28	—	—	
"—" denotes releases that did not chart

=== 1990s ===
Title	Album details	Peak positions
Title	Album details	US Country
Blue Jungle	Release date: July 31, 1990; Label: Curb	47
1994	Release date: March 22, 1994; Label: Curb	60
1996	Release date: January 23, 1996; Label: Curb	—
Cabin in the Hills	Release date: September 9, 1999; Label: Relentless Nashville/Hag Records	—
Two Old Friends (with Albert E. Brumley, Jr.)	Release date: 1999; Label: Hag Records	—

=== 2000s ===
Title	Album details	Peak chart positions		
Title	Album details	US Country	US	US Indie
If I Could Only Fly	Release date: October 10, 2000; Label: ANTI-	26	—	10
Roots, Volume 1	Release date: November 6, 2001; Label: ANTI-	47	—	26
California Blend (with Chester Smith)	Release date: May 7, 2002; Label: Hag Records	—	—	—
The Peer Sessions	Release date: May 21, 2002; Label: Audium	—	—	—
Haggard Like Never Before	Release date: September 23, 2003; Label: Hag	40	—	20
I Wish I Was Santa Claus	Release date: October 26, 2004; Label: Smith Music	—	—	—
Unforgettable	Release date: December 14, 2004; Label: Capitol Nashville	39	—	—
Chicago Wind	Release date: October 25, 2005; Label: Capitol Nashville	54	—	—
Last of the Breed (with Willie Nelson and Ray Price)	Release date: March 20, 2007; Label: Lost Highway	7	64	—
Working Man's Journey	Release date: May 29, 2007; Label: Cracker Barrel	—	—	—
The Bluegrass Sessions	Release date: October 2, 2007; Label: McCoury	43	—	34
"—" denotes releases that did not chart

=== 2010s ===
Title	Album details	Peak chart positions			
Title	Album details	US Country	US	US Indie	CA
I Am What I Am	Release date: April 20, 2010; Label: Vanguard Records	18	77	11	—
Working in Tennessee	Release date: October 4, 2011; Label: Vanguard Records	30	155	25	—
Django & Jimmie (with Willie Nelson)	Release date: June 2, 2015; Label: Legacy Recordings	1	7	—	16
Timeless (with Mac Wiseman)	Release date: June 30, 2015; Label: Hag Records/Cracker Barrel	—	—	—	—

== Live albums ==
Title	Album details	Peak chart positions			Certifications
Title	Album details	US Country	US	CAN	Certifications
Okie from Muskogee (with the Strangers)	Release date: February 1969; Label: Capitol	1	46	64	US: Platinum
The Fightin' Side of Me (with the Strangers and Bonnie Owens)	Release date: July 6, 1970; Label: Capitol	1	68	—	US: Gold
The Land of Many Churches (with the Strangers, Bonnie Owens and the Carter Family)	Release date: November 8, 1971; Label: Capitol	15	—	—	
I Love Dixie Blues (with the Strangers and the Dixieland Express)	Release date: July 1973; Label: Capitol	1	126	—	
Rainbow Stew Live at Anaheim Stadium	Release date: July 1981; Label: MCA	20	—	—	
The Epic Collection (Recorded Live)	Release date: 1983; Label: Epic	28	—	—	
Amber Waves of Grain	Release date: 1985; Label: Epic	25	—	—	
Live from Austin, Texas	Release date: 2006; Label: New West	—	—	—	
Live from Austin, Texas '78	Release date: 2008; Label: New West	—	—	—	
"—" denotes releases that did not chart

== Compilation albums ==
Title	Album details	Peak chart positions		Certifications/ Sales
Title	Album details	US Country	US	Certifications/ Sales
The Best of Merle Haggard	Release date: July 15, 1968; Label: Capitol Records	3	—	US: Platinum
Close-Up	Release date: 1969; Label: Capitol Records	23	—	
The Best of the Best	Release date: September 1972; Label: Capitol Records	1	137	US: Platinum
Songs I'll Always Sing	Release date: April 11, 1977; Label: Capitol Records	15	—	
Eleven Winners	Release date: January 1978; Label: Capitol Records	9	—	
The Way It Was in '51	Release date: September 11, 1978; Label: Capitol Records	30	—	
Merle Haggard's Greatest Hits	Release date: 1982; Label: MCA Records	37	—	
His Epic Hits: The First 11 (To Be Continued...)	Release date: 1984; Label: Epic Records	41	—	US: Platinum
His Best	Release date: 1985; Label: MCA Records	38	—	
Walking the Line (with George Jones and Willie Nelson)	Release date: 1987; Label: Epic	39	—	
Capitol Collectors Series	Release date: January 29, 1990; Label: Capitol Records	—	—	
More Of The Best	Release date: February 2, 1990; Label: Rhino Records	—	—	
Greatest Hits of the 80's	Release date: October 5, 1990; Label: Epic Records	—	—	
18 Rare Classics	Release date: 1991; Label: Curb Records	—	—	
All Night Long	Release date: 1991; Label: Curb Records	—	—	
Super Hits	Release date: March 9, 1993; Label: Epic Records	—	—	
Super Hits, Vol. 2	Release date: November 1, 1994; Label: Epic Records	—	—	US: Gold
Super Hits, Vol. 3	Release date: September 5, 1995; Label: Epic Records	—	—	
Down Every Road 1962–1994	Release date: April 2, 1996; Label: Capitol Nashville	—	—	
16 Biggest Hits	Release date: July 14, 1998; Label: Epic Records	55	167	US: Gold
For the Record, 43 Legendary Hits	Release date: August 24, 1999; Label: BNA Records	38	—	US: Gold
Cheatin'	Release date: September 25, 2001; Label: Capitol Nashville	—	—	
Drinkin'	Release date: September 25, 2001; Label: Capitol Nashville	—	—	
Hurtin'	Release date: September 25, 2001; Label: Capitol Nashville	—	—	
Prison	Release date: September 25, 2001; Label: Capitol Nashville	—	—	
20 Greatest Hits	Release date: February 26, 2002; Label: Capitol Nashville	—	75	US: 332,300
40 #1's	Release date: March 23, 2004; Label: Capitol Nashville	60	—	
40 Greatest Hits, Vol. 1 (Rerecorded)	Release date: May 25, 2004; Label: Entertainment One Music	—	88	
The Essential Merle Haggard: The Epic Years	Release date: August 31, 2004; Label: Epic Records	—	139	
Hag: The Best of Merle Haggard	Release date: September 12, 2006; Label: Capitol Nashville	59	—	
10 Great Songs	Release date: July 3, 2012; Label: Capitol Nashville	75	—	
"—" denotes releases that did not chart

== Other appearances ==
Year	Song	Album
2015	“The Cost of Living” (with Don Henley)	Cass County (album)
2017	“The Only Man Wilder Than Me” (with Willie Nelson)	Music from The American Epic Sessions: Original Motion Picture Soundtrack
2017	“Old Fashioned Love” (with Willie Nelson)	Music from The American Epic Sessions: Original Motion Picture Soundtrack
2018	"Old Friends"	King of the Road: A Tribute to Roger Miller

== Production ==
Year	Album	Artist
2020	Introducing Amy Jack	Amy Jack

== Singles ==
=== 1960s ===
Year	Single	Peak chart positions		Album
Year	Single	US Country	CAN Country	Album
1962	"Singin' My Heart Out"	—	—	Non-album single
1963	"Sing a Sad Song"	19	—	Strangers
1964	"Sam Hill"	45	—	Strangers
1964	"(My Friends Are Gonna Be) Strangers"	10	—	Strangers
1965	"I'm Gonna Break Every Heart I Can"	42	—	Strangers
1966	"Swinging Doors" (with the Strangers)	5	—	Swinging Doors
1966	"The Bottle Let Me Down" (with the Strangers)	3	—	Swinging Doors
1966	"I'm a Lonesome Fugitive" (with the Strangers)	1	—	I'm a Lonesome Fugitive
1967	"I Threw Away the Rose" (with the Strangers)	2	—	Branded Man
1967	"Branded Man" (with the Strangers)	1	—	Branded Man
1967	"Sing Me Back Home" (with the Strangers)	1	7	Sing Me Back Home
1968	"The Legend of Bonnie and Clyde" (with the Strangers)	1	3	The Legend of Bonnie & Clyde
1968	"Mama Tried" (with the Strangers)	1	1	Mama Tried
1968	"I Take a Lot of Pride in What I Am" (with the Strangers)	3	1	Pride in What I Am
1969	"Hungry Eyes" (with the Strangers)	1	2	A Portrait of Merle Haggard
1969	"Workin' Man Blues" (with the Strangers)	1	1	A Portrait of Merle Haggard
1969	"Okie from Muskogee"^{[A]} (with the Strangers)	1	3	Okie from Muskogee
"—" denotes releases that did not chart

=== 1970s ===
Year	Single	Peak chart positions				Album
Year	Single	US Country	US	CAN Country	CAN	Album
1970	"The Fightin' Side of Me" (with The Strangers)	1	92	1	—	The Fightin' Side of Me
1970	"Jesus, Take a Hold" (with the Strangers)	3	107	3	—	Hag
1970	"I Can't Be Myself" (with the Strangers)	3	106	2	—	Hag
1971	"Soldier's Last Letter" (with the Strangers)	3	90	4	—	Hag
1971	"Someday We'll Look Back" (with the Strangers)	2	119	2	—	Someday We'll Look Back
1971	"Daddy Frank (The Guitar Man)" (with the Strangers)	1	—	2	—	Let Me Tell You About a Song
1971	"Carolyn" (with the Strangers)	1	58	2	—	Someday We'll Look Back
1972	"Grandma Harp" (with the Strangers)	1	—	5	—	Let Me Tell You About a Song
1972	"It's Not Love (But It's Not Bad)" (with the Strangers)	1	—	1	—	It's Not Love (But It's Not Bad)
1972	"I Wonder If They Ever Think of Me" (with the Strangers)	1	—	1	—	I Love Dixie Blues
1973	"The Emptiest Arms in the World" (with the Strangers)	3	—	12	—	I Love Dixie Blues
1973	"Everybody's Had the Blues" (with the Strangers)	1	62	1	—	I Love Dixie Blues
1973	"If We Make It Through December"^{[B]} (with the Strangers)	1	28	1	30	If We Make It Through December
1974	"Things Aren't Funny Anymore" (with the Strangers)	1	—	2	—	Merle Haggard Presents His 30th Album
1974	"Old Man from the Mountain" (with the Strangers)	1	—	1	—	Merle Haggard Presents His 30th Album
1974	"Kentucky Gambler" (with the Strangers)	1	—	1	—	Keep Movin' On
1974	"Santa Claus and Popcorn"	—	—	—	—	Merle Haggard's Christmas Present (Something Old, Something New)
1975	"Always Wanting You" (with the Strangers)	1	—	3	—	Keep Movin' On
1975	"Movin' On" (with the Strangers)	1	—	15	—	Keep Movin' On
1975	"It's All in the Movies" (with the Strangers)	1	—	11	—	It's All in the Movies
1976	"The Roots of My Raising" (with the Strangers)	1	—	7	—	The Roots of My Raising
1976	"Here Comes the Freedom Train" (with the Strangers)	10	—	1	—	My Love Affair with Trains
1976	"Cherokee Maiden" (with the Strangers)	1	—	1	—	The Roots of My Raising
1977	"If We're Not Back in Love by Monday"	2	—	2	—	Ramblin' Fever
1977	"Ramblin' Fever"	2	—	3	—	Ramblin' Fever
1977	"A Working Man Can't Get Nowhere Today" (with the Strangers)	16	—	8	—	A Working Man Can't Get Nowhere Today
1977	"From Graceland to the Promised Land"	4	58	3	55	My Farewell to Elvis
1977	"Running Kind" (with the Strangers)	12	—	10	—	A Working Man Can't Get Nowhere Today
1978	"I'm Always on a Mountain When I Fall"	2	—	2	—	I'm Always on a Mountain When I Fall
1978	"It's Been a Great Afternoon"	2	—	1	—	I'm Always on a Mountain When I Fall
1978	"The Way It Was in '51" (with the Strangers)	82	—	58	—	The Way It Was in '51
1978	"The Bull and The Beaver" (with Leona Williams)	8	—	25	—	Non-album single
1979	"Red Bandana"	4	—	2	—	Serving 190 Proof
1979	"My Own Kind of Hat"	4	—	4	—	Serving 190 Proof
"—" denotes releases that did not chart

=== 1980s—2010s ===
Year	Single	Peak chart positions		Album
Year	Single	US Country	CAN Country	Album
1980	"The Way I Am"	2	1	The Way I Am
1980	"Bar Room Buddies" (with Clint Eastwood)	1	1	Bronco Billy (soundtrack)
1980	"Misery and Gin"	3	4	Back to the Barrooms
1980	"I Think I'll Just Stay Here and Drink"	1	29	Back to the Barrooms
1981	"Leonard"	9	7	Back to the Barrooms
1981	"Rainbow Stew" (live)	4	17	Rainbow Stew
1981	"My Favorite Memory"	1	3	Big City
1982	"Big City"	1	1	Big City
1982	"Dealing with the Devil" (live)	49	—	Rainbow Stew
1982	"Are the Good Times Really Over (I Wish a Buck Was Still Silver)"	2	1	Big City
1982	"Going Where the Lonely Go"	1	1	Going Where the Lonely Go
1983	"You Take Me for Granted"	1	9	Going Where the Lonely Go
1983	"What Am I Gonna Do (With the Rest of My Life)"	3	2	That's the Way Love Goes
1983	"It's All in the Game"	54	—	It's All in the Game
1983	"That's the Way Love Goes"	1	1	That's the Way Love Goes
1984	"Someday When Things Are Good"	1	1	That's the Way Love Goes
1984	"Let's Chase Each Other Around the Room"	1	9	It's All in the Game
1984	"A Place to Fall Apart" (featuring Janie Fricke)	1	1	It's All in the Game
1985	"Natural High"	1	2	It's All in the Game
1985	"Make-Up and Faded Blue Jeans"	55	49	His Best
1985	"Kern River"	10	10	Kern River
1985	"Amber Waves of Grain"	36	38	Amber Waves of Grain
1985	"American Waltz"	60	41	Amber Waves of Grain
1986	"I Had a Beautiful Time"	5	4	A Friend in California
1986	"A Friend in California"	9	12	A Friend in California
1986	"Out Among the Stars"	21	22	Out Among the Stars
1987	"Almost Persuaded"	58	54	Out Among the Stars
1987	"Twinkle, Twinkle Lucky Star"	1	1	Chill Factor
1988	"Chill Factor"	9	12	Chill Factor
1988	"We Never Touch at All"	22	26	Chill Factor
1988	"You Babe"	23	21	Chill Factor
1989	"5:01 Blues"	18	14	5:01 Blues
1989	"A Better Love Next Time"	4	10	5:01 Blues
1989	"If You Want to Be My Woman"	23	15	5:01 Blues
1990	"Broken Friend"	—^{[C]}	78	5:01 Blues
1990	"When It Rains It Pours"	60	—	Blue Jungle
1990	"Blue Jungle"	—	—	Blue Jungle
1991	"A Bar in Bakersfield"	—	—	Blue Jungle
1994	"In My Next Life"	58	—	1994
1996	"Truck Driver's Blues"	—	—	1996
1999	"That's the Way Love Goes" (re-recording with Jewel)	56	71	For the Record, 43 Legendary Hits
2000	"Motorcycle Cowboy" (live)	—	—	Live at Billy Bob's Texas: Motorcycle Cowboy
2001	"If You've Got the Money (I've Got the Time)"	—	—	Roots, Volume 1
2011	"Working in Tennessee"	—	—	Working in Tennessee
2016	"Kern River Blues"	—	—	Non-album single
"—" denotes releases that did not chart

== Other singles ==
=== Singles from collaboration albums ===
Year	Single	Artist	Peak chart positions			Album
Year	Single	Artist	US Country	US AC	CAN Country	Album
1964	"Just Between the Two of Us" (with The Strangers)	Bonnie Owens	28	—	—	Just Between the Two of Us with The Strangers
1982	"Yesterday's Wine"	George Jones	1	—	5	A Taste of Yesterday's Wine
1982	"C.C. Waterback"	George Jones	10	—	18	A Taste of Yesterday's Wine
1982	"Reasons to Quit"	Willie Nelson	6	—	7	Pancho & Lefty
1983	"Pancho and Lefty"	Willie Nelson	1	21	1	Pancho & Lefty
1983	"We're Strangers Again"	Leona Williams	42	—	—	Heart to Heart
1987	"If I Could Only Fly"	Willie Nelson	58	—	50	Seashores of Old Mexico
2000	"Wreck on the Highway"	Chester Smith	—	—	—	California Blend
2015	"It's All Going to Pot"	Willie Nelson	48	—	—	Django & Jimmie
— denotes releases that did not chart.

=== Guest singles ===
Year	Single	Artist	Peak chart positions		Album
Year	Single	Artist	US Country	CAN Country	Album
1978	"Willie"	Hank Cochran	91	—	With a Little Help from My Friends
1979	"Walking the Floor Over You"	Ernest Tubb	31	18	The Legend and the Legacy
1981	"I Can't Hold Myself in Line"	Johnny Paycheck	41	41	Mr. Hag Told My Story
1981	"Lefty"	David Frizzell	45	—	Carryin' on the Family Names
1998	"Same Old Train"	Various artists	59	—	Tribute to Tradition
2005	"Politically Uncorrect"	Gretchen Wilson	23	—	All Jacked Up
2013	"I Think I'll Just Stay Here and Drink"	Hank Williams, Jr.	—	—	Old School New Rules
"—" denotes releases that did not chart

== Charted B-sides ==
Year	Single	Peak chart positions			A-Side
Year	Single	US Country	US	CAN Country	A-Side
1966	"Someone Told My Story" (with The Strangers)	32	—	—	"The Fugitive" (with The Strangers)
1970	"Sidewalks of Chicago" (with The Strangers)	flip	flip	—	"I Can't Be Myself" (with The Strangers)
1972	"Turnin' Off a Memory" (with The Strangers)	flip	—	—	"Grandma Harp" (with The Strangers)
1976	"What Have You Got Planned Tonight Diana" (with The Strangers)	flip	—	—	"Cherokee Maiden" (with The Strangers)
1977	"When My Blue Moon Turns to Gold Again"	flip	—	—	"Ramblin' Fever"
1978	"Making Believe" (with The Strangers)	flip	—	—	"Running Kind" (with The Strangers)
1978	"Love Me When You Can"	flip	—	—	"It's Been a Great Afternoon"
1979	"I Must Have Done Something Bad"	flip	—	—	"Red Bandana"
1979	"Heaven Was a Drink of Wine"	flip	—	—	"My Own Kind of Hat"
1981	"Our Paths May Never Cross"	—	—	55	"Leonard"
"—" denotes releases that did not chart

== Music videos ==
Year	Video	Director
1982	"Are the Good Times Really Over" (live)	
1983	"Pancho and Lefty" (with Willie Nelson)	Lana Nelson
1985	"Natural High"	
1985	"Kern River"	
1990	"Me and Crippled Soldiers"	Tom Hartman
2000	"Motorcycle Cowboy"	David Abbott
2000	"(Think About A) Lullaby"	Piper Ferguson
2001	"If You've Got the Money, I've Got the Time"	Bobby G.
2003	"Farmer's Blues" (with Marty Stuart)	Deb Haus
2004	"That's the News"	
2005	"America First"	Traci Goudie
2006	"Politically Uncorrect" (with Gretchen Wilson)	Deaton Flanigen
2015	It's All Going to Pot" (with Willie Nelson)	
2015	"Alice in Hulaland" (with Willie Nelson)	Micah Nelson

== Notes ==
- A "Okie from Muskogee" also peaked at number 41 on the Billboard Hot 100.
- B "If We Make It Through December" also peaked at number 37 on the Canadian RPM Adult Contemporary Tracks chart.
- C "Broken Friend" did not chart on Hot Country Songs, but peaked at No. 4 on Hot Country Radio Breakouts.
