= His Epic Hits: The First 11 (To Be Continued...) =

Greatest hits album by Merle Haggard
- Released: 1984
- Genre: Country
- Length: 39:20
- Label: Epic
- Producer: Chips Moman; Merle Haggard; Willie Nelson; Ray Baker; Billy Sherrill

Merle Haggard chronology
That's the Way Love Goes (1983)	His Epic Hits: The First 11 (To Be Continued...) (1984)	It's All in the Game (1984)

His Epic Hits: The First 11 (To Be Continued...) is a compilation album by American country music artist Merle Haggard. It was released in 1983 via Epic Records.

== Track listing ==
No.	Title	Writer(s)	Length
1.	"Reasons to Quit" (duet with Willie Nelson)	Merle Haggard	3:28
2.	"You Take Me for Granted"	Leona Williams	2:39
3.	"That's the Way Love Goes"	Lefty Frizzell, Sanger D. Shafer	2:59
4.	"Are the Good Times Really Over (I Wish a Buck Was Still Silver)"	Haggard	4:11
5.	"Big City"	Haggard, Dean Holloway	2:58
6.	"Pancho and Lefty" (duet with Willie Nelson)	Townes Van Zandt	4:44
7.	"Someday When Things Are Good"	Haggard, Williams	3:34
8.	"What Am I Gonna Do (With the Rest of My Life)"	Haggard	3:31
9.	"My Favorite Memory"	Haggard	3:05
10.	"Going Where the Lonely Go"	Haggard	4:47
11.	"C.C. Waterback" (duet with George Jones)	Haggard	3:29

== Chart performance ==
Chart (1984)	Peak position
US Top Country Albums (Billboard)	41
