= A Friend in California =

A Friend in California may refer to:

- A Friend in California (song)
- A Friend in California (album)
