= That's the Way Love Goes =

That's the Way Love Goes may refer to:

== Albums ==
- That's the Way Love Goes (Connie Smith album), 1974, named after and containing the Lefty Frizzell song
- That's the Way Love Goes (Merle Haggard album), 1983, named after and containing the Lefty Frizzell song

== Songs ==
- "That's the Way Love Goes" (Johnny Rodriguez song), 1973; originally performed by Lefty Frizzell
- "That's the Way Love Goes", a song by Young MC from Brainstorm, 1991
- "That's the Way Love Goes" (Janet Jackson song), 1993
- "That's the Way Love Goes", a song by Louis Tomlinson from Faith in the Future, 2022
- "That's the Way that Love Goes", a song by Lindsey Buckingham from Seeds We Sow, 2011

== See also ==
- That's the Way Love Is (disambiguation)
