= Chill factor =

Chill factor may refer to:

- Wind chill factor, a meteorological measurement

== Film ==
- Chill Factor (film), 1999 American action film starring Cuba Gooding Jr. and Skeet Ulrich
- A Cold Night's Death, a 1973 American made-for-TV film, also called The Chill Factor

== Other uses ==
- Chill Factor (novel), a 1992 science fiction novel by Laurence James (James Axler)
- Chill Factore (styled Chill Factor^{e}), an indoor ski slope in Manchester, England
- Chill Factor (album), a 1987 album by American country music artist Merle Haggard
  - "Chill Factor" (song), a 1988 song from the LP
- Chill Factor, a song from the album Get Close by the Pretenders
