= Amber Waves =

Amber Waves may refer to:

- Amber Waves, a character in the film Boogie Nights, played by Julianne Moore
- Amber Waves (The Americans), an episode of the American television series The Americans
- Amber Waves, a song by Tori Amos from the album Scarlet's Walk
- Amber Waves, a song by Ethel Cain from the album Perverts

== See also ==
- Amber Waves of Grain, a 1985 live album by Merle Haggard
