= Influence Vol. 1: The Man I Am =

Studio album by Randy Travis
- Released: October 1, 2013
- Genre: Country
- Label: Warner Bros. Nashville
- Producer: Kyle Lehning

Randy Travis chronology
Anniversary Celebration (2011)	Influence Vol. 1: The Man I Am (2013)	Influence Vol. 2: The Man I Am (2014)

Singles from Influence, Vol 1: The Man I Am
- 1. "Tonight I'm Playin' Possum" Released: June 11, 2013

Professional ratings
Review scores
Source	Rating
Allmusic	3/5 stars

Influence Vol. 1: The Man I Am is the twenty-first studio album and the first covers album by country music star Randy Travis, and was released on October 1, 2013, by Warner Bros. Records Nashville.

== Track listing ==
1. "Someday We'll Look Back" (Merle Haggard) - 3:26
2. "Big Butter and Egg Man" (Percy Venable) - 3:23
3. "What Have You Got Planned Tonight Diana" (Dave Kirby) - 3:28
4. "Ever-Changing Woman" (Kirby, Curly Putman) - 2:55
5. "Pennies from Heaven" (Johnny Burke, Arthur Johnston) - 3:46
6. "Thanks a Lot" (Eddie Miller, Don Sessions) - 2:42
7. "Trouble in Mind" (Richard M. Jones) - 3:29
8. "My Mary" (Jimmie Davis, Stuart Hamblen) - 3:09
9. "Saginaw, Michigan" (Bill Anderson, Don Wayne) - 3:10
10. "I'm Always on a Mountain (When I Fall)" (Chuck Howard) - 3:21
11. "You Asked Me To" (Waylon Jennings, Billy Joe Shaver) - 3:40
12. "Why Baby Why" (Darrell Edwards, George Jones) - 2:40
13. "Tonight I'm Playin' Possum" (with Joe Nichols) (Keith Gattis, Travis) - 3:42

== Personnel ==
- Bill Cook - bass guitar, upright bass, background vocals
- Lance Dary - acoustic guitar, background vocals
- David Davidson - violin
- Joe Van Dyke - keyboards
- Connie Ellisor - violin
- Steve Gibson - electric guitar, gut string guitar, mandolin
- Jim Grosjean - viola
- Wes Hightower - background vocals
- Steve Hinson - dobro, steel guitar
- Robb Houstan - acoustic guitar, background vocals
- Jon Mark Ivey - background vocals
- David Johnson - fiddle
- Kyle Lehning - Wurlitzer
- Joe Manuel - acoustic guitar
- Rick Wayne Money - electric guitar, tic tac bass guitar
- Joe Nichols - duet vocals on "Tonight I'm Playing Possom"
- Carole Rabinowitz - cello
- Herb Shucher - drums
- Lisa Silver - background vocals
- Pam Sixfin - violin
- Kira Small - background vocals
- Randy Travis - lead vocals
- Alan Umstead - violin
- Bergen White - background vocals
- Kris Wilkinson - viola

== Chart performance ==
Chart (2013)	Peak position
US Billboard 200	120
US Top Country Albums (Billboard)	19
