= Walking the Line =

Walking the Line may refer to:

- Walking the Line (Oscar Peterson album)
- Walking the Line (Merle Haggard, George Jones and Willie Nelson album)
