= Walking the Line (Merle Haggard, George Jones and Willie Nelson album) =

Compilation album by Merle Haggard, George Jones and Willie Nelson
- Released: 1987
- Genre: Country
- Label: Epic

Merle Haggard chronology
Out Among the Stars (1987)	Walking the Line (1987)	Chill Factor (1987)

George Jones chronology
Ladies' Choice (1984)	Walking the Line (1987)	Friends in High Places (1991)

Willie Nelson chronology
Island in the Sea (1987)	Walking the Line (1987)	What a Wonderful World (1988)

Professional ratings
Review scores
Source	Rating
Allmusic	2/5 stars

Walking the Line is an album by American country music artists Merle Haggard, George Jones, and Willie Nelson, released in 1987.

== Background ==
Much like the successful seventies album Wanted! The Outlaws, Walking the Line features duets and solo cuts taken from various albums and repackaged as a single album. Jones and Haggard had recorded a duet album, A Taste of Yesterday's Wine in 1982 (the title cut having been by Nelson) while Haggard and Nelson had collaborated on Pancho & Lefty the same year. It reached number 39 on the Billboard country albums chart. All three artists had been under contract to CBS Records in the early eighties. The album does not feature a song with all three singing.

== Track listing ==
1. "I Gotta Get Drunk" (Willie Nelson)
2. "No Show Jones" (George Jones, Glen Martin)
3. "Pancho & Lefty" (Townes Van Zandt)
4. "Yesterday's Wine" (Nelson)
5. "Half a Man" (Nelson)
6. "Big Butter and Egg Man (Armstrong, Venable)
7. "Heaven and Hell" (Nelson)
8. "Midnight Rider" (Gregg Allman)
9. "Are the Good Times Really Over (I Wish a Buck Was Still Silver)" (Merle Haggard)
10. "A Drunk Can't be a Man" (Jones, Earl Montgomery)
