= I'm Always on a Mountain When I Fall =

Studio album by Merle Haggard
- Released: June 1978
- Recorded: Fireside, Nashville, TN
- Genre: Country
- Length: 29:32
- Label: MCA
- Producer: Fuzzy Owen, Hank Cochran

Merle Haggard chronology
My Farewell to Elvis (1977)	I'm Always on a Mountain When I Fall (1978)	Serving 190 Proof (1979)

Singles from I'm Always on a Mountain When I Fall
- 1. "I'm Always on a Mountain When I Fall" Released: 1978; 2. "It's Been a Great Afternoon" Released: 1978

I'm Always on a Mountain When I Fall is an album by American country music singer Merle Haggard, released in 1978. It reached number 17 on the Country album chart.

== Background ==
In the span of two years, Haggard switched record labels, divorced Bonnie Owens, married backup singer Leona Williams, and moved to Nashville to record with Jimmy Bowen. In the CMT episode of Inside Fame dedicated to Haggard, Owens speculates that Haggard preferred climbing the ladder of success more than being at the top "'cause he did seem like he did everything he could to fall down again so he could climb back up." I'm Always on a Mountain When I Fall was released in June 1978 and performed a career worst chart wise (Capitol's 1977 collection, A Working Man Can't Get Nowhere Today, had only reached number 28 but had been released after Haggard had left the label), but the album did produce two hits: both the title track and "It's Been A Great Afternoon" reached number 2.

== Critical reception ==
Professional ratings
Review scores
Source	Rating
AllMusic	3/5 stars
The Rolling Stone Album Guide	2/5 stars

AllMusic deems the album "well worth owning."

== Track listing ==
No.	Title	Writer(s)	Length
1.	"I'm Always on a Mountain When I Fall"	Chuck Howard	2:48
2.	"It's Been a Great Afternoon"	Merle Haggard	2:50
3.	"Love Me When You Can"	Haggard	3:18
4.	"There Won't Be Another Now"	Red Lane	3:50
5.	"Don't You Ever Get Tired (Of Hurting Me)"	Hank Cochran	3:22
6.	"Life of a Rodeo Cowboy"	Cochran, Jeannie Seely	2:57
7.	"There Ain't No Good Chain Gang"	Hal Bynum, Dave Kirby	2:55
8.	"The Dream"	Haggard	2:01
9.	"The Immigrant"	Haggard, Kirby	3:05
10.	"Mama I've Got to Go to Memphis"	Leona Williams	3:03

== Chart positions ==
Year	Chart	Position
1978	Billboard Country albums	17
