= Like Never Before (Merle Haggard album) =

Studio album by Merle Haggard
- Released: September 23, 2003
- Genre: Country
- Length: 31:38
- Label: Hag
- Producer: Merle Haggard, Lou Bradley

Merle Haggard chronology
The Peer Sessions (2002)	Like Never Before (2003)	I Wish I Was Santa Claus (2004)

Like Never Before is the fifty-fifth studio album by American recording artist Merle Haggard. It was released in 2004 on his own label, Hag Records.

== Background ==
After several gospel and roots music albums, this collection boasts a more diverse musical landscape than his critically acclaimed comeback album If I Could Only Fly, ranging from the western swing of "Garbage Man" and "Lonesome Day" to the jazz-inflected "Because of Your Eyes" and the mariachi-infused "Return to San Francisco". Haggard duets with friend Willie Nelson on "Reno Blues". The album is perhaps best remembered for the song "That's the News", a scathing indictment of media culture and the Bush administration's handling of the war in Iraq in the early 2000s. In a 2006 interview the notoriously patriotic Haggard defended the Dixie Chicks, after they were lambasted for their criticism of President George W. Bush.

== Reception ==
Professional ratings
Review scores
Source	Rating
AllMusic	4/5 stars
Robert Christgau	**

Thom Jurek of Allmusic praises the album, calling it "meticulously crafted and arranged, full of beautiful charts and striking vocal and instrumental performances." In his review, music critic Robert Christgau only wrote "Rebel, patriot, musician, legend, populist, sentimentalist, small businessman."

== Track listing ==
1. "Haggard (Like I've Never Been Before)" (Merle Haggard, Doug Colosio) – 3:22
2. "That's the News" (Haggard) – 2:33
3. "Garbage Man" – 2:56
4. "Reno Blues (Philadelphia Lawyer)" (with Willie Nelson) – 3:33
5. "The Downside" (Haggard) – 1:59
6. "Because of Your Eyes" (Haggard) – 3:48
7. "Lonesome Day" (Haggard, Colosio) – 2:06
8. "I Dreamed You Didn't Love Me" (Haggard) – 3:04
9. "Yellow Ribbons" (Haggard) – 2:59
10. "I Hated to See You Go" (Haggard) – 2:53
11. "Return to San Francisco" (Haggard) – 2:25

== Personnel ==
- Merle Haggard – vocals, guitar
- Norm Hamlet – pedal steel guitar
- Don Markham – saxophone, trumpet
- Clint Strong – guitar
- Red Lane – guitar
- Doug Colosio – keyboards
- Andy Kaulkin – piano
- Mike Martin – harmonica
- Willie Nelson – vocals, guitar
- Norman Stevens – guitar
- Kevin Williams – bass
- Jeff Ingraham – drums
- Kenny Malone – drums
- Scott Joss – fiddle, guitar, background vocals
- Theresa Lane Haggard – background vocals
