= That's the Way Love Is =

That's the Way Love Is may refer to:

- That's the Way Love Is (album), a 1970 album by Marvin Gaye
- "That's the Way Love Is" (The Isley Brothers song), a 1967 song by The Isley Brothers, later covered by The Temptations and Marvin Gaye
- "That's the Way Love Is" (Bobby Bland song), a 1963 song by Bobby Bland
- "That's the Way Love Is" (Ten City song), a 1989 song by Ten City
- "That's the Way Love Is" (Bobby Brown song), a 1993 song by Bobby Brown

== See also ==
- That's the Way Love Goes (disambiguation)
