= Influence Vol. 2: The Man I Am =

Studio album by Randy Travis
- Released: August 19, 2014
- Genre: Neotraditionalist country
- Label: Warner Bros. Nashville
- Producer: Kyle Lehning

Randy Travis chronology
Influence Vol. 1: The Man I Am (2013)	Influence Vol. 2: The Man I Am (2014)	Precious Memories (Worship & Faith) (2020)

Singles from Influence, Vol. 2: The Man I Am
- 1. "Don't Worry 'Bout Me" Released: July 22, 2014; 2. "Only Daddy That'll Walk the Line" Released: July 29, 2014; 3. "That's the Way Love Goes" Released: August 5, 2014

Influence Vol. 2: The Man I Am is the twenty-second studio album and the second covers album by American country music singer Randy Travis. It is the follow-up to his 2013 album Influence Vol. 1: The Man I Am, and like its predecessor, it features cover songs.

== Critical reception ==
Rating it 3 out of 5 stars, Stephen Thomas Erlewine of Allmusic wrote that "he makes it sound easy when you know damn well it isn't."

== Track listing ==
1. "I'm Movin' On" (Hank Snow) - 3:06
2. "Set 'Em Up Joe" (Vern Gosdin, Buddy Cannon, Hank Cochran, Dean Dillon) - 2:31
3. "Are the Good Times Really Over" (Merle Haggard) - 4:24
4. "You Nearly Lose Your Mind" (Ernest Tubb) - 2:36
5. "There! I've Said It Again" (Redd Evans, David Mann) - 2:50
6. "That's the Way Love Goes" (Lefty Frizzell, Sanger D. Shafer) - 3:08
7. "Sunday Morning Coming Down" (Kris Kristofferson) - 4:07
8. "Don't Worry 'bout Me" (Rube Bloom, Ted Koehler) - 3:14
9. "Mind Your Own Business" (Hank Williams) 3:36
10. "Only Daddy That'll Walk the Line" (Jimmy Bryant) - 2:41
11. "For the Good Times" (Kristofferson) - 3:34
12. "California Blues" (Jimmie Rodgers) - 2:49
13. "Tonight I'm Playin' Possum (solo version)" (Keith Gattis, Randy Travis) - 3:41

== Chart performance ==
Chart (2014)	Peak position
US Top Country Albums (Billboard)	26
