= A Place to Fall Apart =

Single by Merle Haggard with Janie Fricke

from the album It's All in the Game
- B-side: "All I Want to Do Is Singing My Songs"
- Released: October 27, 1984
- Genre: Country
- Length: 3:36
- Label: Epic
- Songwriters: Merle Haggard; Willie Nelson; Freddy Powers
- Producers: Ray Baker; Merle Haggard

Merle Haggard singles chronology
"Let's Chase Each Other Around the Room" (1984)	"A Place to Fall Apart" (1984)	"Natural High" (1985)

Janie Fricke singles chronology
"Your Heart's Not in It" (1984)	"A Place to Fall Apart" (1984)	"The First Word in Memory Is Me" (1984)

"A Place to Fall Apart" is a song co-written and recorded by American country music artist Merle Haggard as a duet with Janie Fricke and backed by The Strangers. It was released in October 1984 as the second single from the album It's All in the Game. The song was the first single where Haggard and Fricke worked together. The single went to number one for one week and spent a total of fourteen weeks on the country chart. Haggard wrote the song with Willie Nelson and Freddy Powers.

== Personnel ==
- Merle Haggard– vocals, guitar, fiddle

The Strangers:

- Roy Nichols - lead guitar
- Norm Hamlet – steel guitar
- Tiny Moore – fiddle, mandolin
- Mark Yeary – keyboards
- Dennis Hromek - bass
- Biff Adams - drums
- Jim Belken – fiddle
- Don Markham – horns

== Chart performance ==
Chart (1984–1985)	Peak position
US Hot Country Songs (Billboard)	1
Canadian RPM Country Tracks	1
