= It's All Going to Pot =

Single by Willie Nelson, Merle Haggard

from the album Django & Jimmie
- Released: April 20, 2015
- Recorded: 2015
- Genre: Country
- Length: 2:56
- Label: Legacy Recordings
- Songwriters: Buddy Cannon, Larry Shell, Jamey Johnson
- Producer: Buddy Cannon

Willie Nelson singles chronology
"Who'll Buy My Memories" (2014)	"It's All Going to Pot" (2015)

"It's All Going to Pot" is a song written by Buddy Cannon, Larry Shell and Jamey Johnson. The song was recorded by Willie Nelson and Merle Haggard featuring Johnson. It was released on April 20, 2015, as the single to the album Django & Jimmie.

== Overview ==
The song was written by producer Buddy Cannon, Larry Shell and Jamey Johnson. Recorded by Willie Nelson and Merle Haggard, it featured a cameo by Johnson. It became the single for Nelson and Haggard's 2015 collaboration album Django & Jimmie.

The single was released on April 20, 2015, or 4/20, a date significant for its implication in cannabis culture. A video of the song was released on the same day, featuring Haggard and Nelson recording the song in the studio. A behind-the-scenes video of the recording of the song was released, featuring both singers and Cannon discussing the lyrics of the song.

== Chart performance ==
Chart (2015)	Peak position
US Hot Country Songs (Billboard)	48
