= If I Could Only Fly =

Studio album by Merle Haggard
- Released: October 10, 2000
- Genre: Country
- Length: 35:45
- Label: ANTI-/Epitaph

Merle Haggard chronology
1996 (1996)	If I Could Only Fly (2000)	Cabin in the Hills (2001)

If I Could Only Fly is the 50th studio album by American country singer Merle Haggard, released in 2000. The album reached number 26 on the Billboard Country albums chart. The title song is a cover of a 1979 song written and recorded by Texas songwriter Blaze Foley. Haggard had previously recorded the song as a duet with American country singer Willie Nelson on their 1987 album, Seashores of Old Mexico, peaking at number 58 on the 1987 Billboard Hot Country Songs singles chart.

== Background ==
The 1990s was the most trying decade of Haggard's professional life. Beset by financial woes that led to bankruptcy in 1993, Haggard had also run afoul of his record label boss Mike Curb. Since 1990, Haggard had released three albums on Curb and all three had charted lower than any had in his thirty-year career, with the last of them, 1996, not charting at all. Personally, Haggard had been doing much better; he had kicked the drug and alcohol problems that had plagued him for much of the 1980s and had married his fifth wife Teresa Lane in 1993. In 1995, he was inducted into the Country Music Hall of Fame, but when his contract with Curb expired he signed with the independent ANTI- label. The move paid immediate dividends both critically and artistically; no longer compelled to compete for airplay on country radio with a fashionable hit single, the album focused on Haggard's strengths—his singing and songwriting—and wound up rising to number 26 on the Hot Country Album Chart, his highest showing since 1987's Chill Factor. Critics were nearly unanimous in their praise for the album, which remained on the charts for 27 weeks.

"(Think About a) Lullaby," was written by Haggard and his wife Teresa. The album's title track had been previously recorded by Haggard with Willie Nelson on their 1987 duet album Seashores of Old Mexico.

== Reception ==
Professional ratings
Review scores
Source	Rating
AllMusic	4/5 stars
Robert Christgau	A−
Pitchfork	7.6/10

Comparing If I Could Only Fly favorably to Bob Dylan's Time Out of Mind, Ryan Kearney of Pitchfork writes, "in listening to their reflections on aging and the accompanying doubts, we can learn how to face our own mortality with greater equanimity and fewer regrets." Ben Ratliff of Rolling Stone gave the album 4 stars, enthusing, "...what a lyricist he still can be. All the songs emanate from a single persona, an aging, cloistered singer (Haggard is in his sixties) whose routine—avoiding drugs, taking comfort from cushioned bus seats, being honest with his kids — is all he has". Stephen Thomas Erlewine of AllMusic wrote: "If I Could Only Fly is the first album in years that deserves to be compared to Haggard's classic work." Music critic Robert Christgau wrote "After a long, dispiriting string of releases that gradually devolved from hit-or-miss to cynical, he comes out of nowhere on a punk label to cut one of the very best albums of his very uneven recording career."

== Track listing ==
All songs by Merle Haggard unless otherwise noted:

1. "Wishing All These Old Things Were New" – 3:20
2. "Honky Tonky Mama" (Haggard, Traditional) – 3:07
3. "Turn to Me" – 3:10
4. "If I Could Only Fly" (Blaze Foley) – 4:59
5. "Crazy Moon" (Haggard, Max Barnes) – 2:07
6. "Bareback" – 2:12
7. "(Think About A) Lullaby" (Haggard, Theresa Lane Haggard) – 2:24
8. "I'm Still Your Daddy" – 2:54
9. "Proud to Be Your Old Man" (Haggard, Abe Manuel, Jr.) – 2:26
10. "Leavin's Getting Harder" – 2:10
11. "Thanks to Uncle John" – 2:43
12. "Listening (To the Wind)" – 4:10

== Personnel ==
- Merle Haggard – vocals, guitar
- Norm Hamlet – steel guitar
- Biff Adams – drums
- Don Markham – saxophone, harmony vocals
- Eddie Curtis – bass
- Floyd Domino – piano
- Abe Manuel, Jr. – guitar, fiddle, mandolin, percussion, piano, accordion, harp, harmony vocals
- Joe Manuel – guitar
- Randy Mason – guitar
- Oleg Schramm – piano
- Redd Volkaert – guitar

Production notes:

- Lou Bradley – engineer, mixing
- Jesse Fischer – art direction, design
- Johnny Whiteside – liner notes

== Chart performance ==
Chart (2000)	Peak position
U.S. Billboard Top Country Albums	26
U.S. Billboard Independent Albums	10
