= It's All in the Game (Merle Haggard album) =

Studio album by Merle Haggard
- Released: 1984
- Recorded: October 1983/Early 1984
- Genre: Country
- Length: 29:53
- Label: Epic
- Producer: Merle Haggard, Ray Baker

Merle Haggard chronology
The Epic Collection (Recorded Live) (1983)	It's All in the Game (1984)	Kern River (1985)

Singles from It's All in the Game
- 1. "Let's Chase Each Other Around the Room" Released: July 14, 1984; 2. "A Place to Fall Apart" Released: October 27, 1984; 3. "Natural High" Released: March 16, 1985

It's All in the Game is the thirty-ninth studio album by American country music artist Merle Haggard backed by the Strangers, released in 1984 by Epic Records. The album peaked at number 1 on the Billboard Top Country Albums chart.

== Recording and composition ==
Haggard's only album from 1984 is dominated with songs co-written with Freddy Powers. The country singer's career was booming during this period like it hadn't since the early seventies, and It's All in the Game continued this roll, producing three #1 hits. The first of these, "Let's Chase Each Other Around the Room," recalls the shuffling rhythm of his 1981 hit "Big City" and finds the narrator attempting to playfully reignite the passion of his marriage. The other two chart toppers, "A Place to Fall Apart" (co-written with Willie Nelson and featuring Janie Fricke on background vocals) and the love song "Natural High," have a softer vocal approach more indicative of the album's overall sound. "Little Hotel Room" and "I Never Go Home Anymore" contain Haggard's oft-used themes of loss, loneliness and estrangement. The LP also includes his take on the recent Willie Nelson/Julio Iglesias smash "To All the Girls I've Loved Before" and "You Nearly Lose Your Mind," his tribute to Ernest Tubb, who died in September 1984.

== Critical reception ==
Professional ratings
Review scores
Source	Rating
AllMusic	2/5 stars

AllMusic: "In another artist's hands, It's All In the Game might have been a mere crying-in-the-beer soundtrack. In Haggard's, it's deeply personal and emotionally compelling music."

== Track listing ==
No.	Title	Writer(s)	Length
1.	"Let's Chase Each Other Around the Room"	Merle Haggard, Freddy Powers, Sheril Rodgers	2:48
2.	"A Place to Fall Apart" (with Janie Fricke)	Haggard, Willie Nelson, Powers	3:36
3.	"It's All in the Game"	Charles Dawes, Carl Sigman	3:45
4.	"Little Hotel Room"	Powers	3:15
5.	"I Never Go Home Anymore"	Haggard	2:33
6.	"All I Want to Do Is Sing My Song"	Haggard, Powers	3:15
7.	"Natural High"	Powers	3:05
8.	"Thank Heaven for Little Girls"	Alan Jay Lerner, Frederick Loewe	2:29
9.	"To All the Girls I've Loved Before"	Hal David, Albert Hammond	2:54
10.	"You Nearly Lose Your Mind"	Ernest Tubb	2:21

== Personnel ==
- Merle Haggard – vocals, guitar

The Strangers:

- Roy Nichols – lead guitar
- Norm Hamlet – steel guitar
- Tiny Moore – fiddle, mandolin
- Mark Yeary – keyboards
- Dennis Hromek – bass guitar
- Biff Adams – drums
- Jim Belken – fiddle
- Don Markham – horns

with:

- Freddy Powers – rhythm guitar

and:

- Bobby Wood – keyboards
- Mike Leach – bass guitar
- Lloyd Lindroth – harp

== Charts ==
=== Weekly charts ===
Chart (1984)	Peak position
Canadian Country Albums (RPM)	6
US Top Country Albums (Billboard)	1

=== Year-end charts ===
Chart (1984)	Position
US Top Country Albums (Billboard)	23
Chart (1985)	Position
US Top Country Albums (Billboard)	46
