= My Own Kind of Hat =

1979 single by Merle Haggard

Single by Merle Haggard

from the album Serving 190 Proof
- Released: September 1979
- Genre: Country
- Length: 2:53
- Label: MCA
- Songwriter(s): Merle Haggard, Red Lane
- Producer(s): Fuzzy Owen, Jimmy Bowen

Merle Haggard singles chronology
"Red Bandana" (1979)	"My Own Kind of Hat" (1979)	"Walkin' the Floor Over You" (1979)

"My Own Kind of Hat" is a song co-written and recorded by American country music artist Merle Haggard. It was released in September 1979 as the second single from the album Serving 190 Proof. The song reached number 4 on the Billboard Hot Country Singles & Tracks chart. The song was written by Haggard and Red Lane.

== Chart performance ==
Chart (1979)	Peak position
US Hot Country Songs (Billboard)	4
Canadian RPM Country Tracks	4

== Alan Jackson version ==
"My Own Kind of Hat"

Song by Alan Jackson

from the album Under the Influence
- Released: October 26, 1999
- Genre: Country
- Length: 3:22
- Label: Arista Nashville
- Songwriter(s): Merle Haggard; Red Lane
- Producer(s): Keith Stegall

- Alan Jackson covered the song for his 1999 album Under the Influence. Although not released as a single, Jackson's cover charted at number 71 due to unsolicited airplay.
