= Two Old Friends =

Studio album by Merle Haggard and Albert E. Brumley, Jr.
- Released: 1999
- Genre: Country
- Length: 32:43
- Label: Compendia

Merle Haggard and Albert E. Brumley, Jr. chronology
Cabin in the Hills (2001)	Two Old Friends (1999)	Roots, Volume 1 (2001)

Two Old Friends is the fifty-second studio album by Merle Haggard and Albert E. Brumley Jr, son of gospel legend and songwriter Albert E. Brumley. It was released in 1999.

== Reception ==
AllMusic's review stated "Backed by Haggard's crack touring band, the pair work their way through compositions... with the immediacy and warmth of a back-porch jam session."

== Track listing ==
1. "There's a Road Down the Road" (Albert E. Brumley Jr., Dale Vest) – 2:13
2. "Victory in Jesus" (Eugene Bartlett) – 2:33
3. "The Old Drover's Prayer" (Brumley Jr.) – 2:17
4. "If You See a Change in Me" (Merle Haggard) – 3:15
5. "I Dreamed I Met Mother and Daddy" (Brumley Jr., Kay Hively) – 3:12
6. "I'll Fly Away" (Albert E. Brumley) – 3:04
7. "Old Rugged Shoes" (Haggard) – 3:21
8. "Marching Over Jordan" (Brumley Jr., Hively) – 2:49
9. "Someday He'll Whisper My Name" (Haggard) – 4:03
10. "Everybody Knows" (Brumley Jr., Hively) – 2:37
11. "I'll Meet You in the Morning" (Brumley) – 3:19

== Personnel ==
- Merle Haggard – vocals, guitar, fiddle
- Norm Hamlet – dobro, pedal steel guitar
- Don Markham – trumpet
- Bonnie Owens – harmony vocals
- Albert Brumley Jr. – vocals
- Doug Colosio – keyboards, piano
- Eddie Curtis – bass
- Abe Manuel Jr. – accordion, fiddle, guitar
- Randy Mason – drums
- Redd Volkaert – guitar
- Floyd Domino – piano
