= Serving 190 Proof =

Studio album by Merle Haggard
- Released: May 18, 1979
- Genre: Country
- Length: 34:32
- Label: MCA
- Producer: Jimmy Bowen, Fuzzy Owen

Merle Haggard chronology
I'm Always on a Mountain When I Fall (1978)	Serving 190 Proof (1979)	The Way I Am (1980)

Singles from Serving 190 Proof
- 1. "Red Bandana" Released: March 18, 1979; 2. "My Own Kind of Hat" Released: September 1979

Serving 190 Proof is a studio album by American country music singer Merle Haggard, released in May 1979. It reached Number 17 on the Billboard Country album chart. Two singles were released and both peaked at number 4 on the Billboard Country Singles chart — "My Own Kind Of Hat" and "Red Bandana".

== Background ==
Although Serving 190 Proof only made it to number 17 on the Billboard country albums chart (as had his previous album I'm Always On a Mountain When I Fall), it was a comeback of sorts for Haggard. Writing in his book The Running Kind in 2013, Haggard biographer David Cantwell calls the LP "a revelation. An unprecedented intersection in the Haggard catalogue of introspective songwriting and musical experimentation, Serving 190 Proof can still startle all these years later with its forthright examination of alcoholism and depression, and its jaded takes on the musician's life." After contributing only a handful of songs to his previous MCA albums, the singer composed most of Serving 190 Proof.

== Recording and Composition ==
The album is probably best remembered for its opener "Footlights," a mid-career rumination on the loneliness of a touring musician's life. Haggard has often stated that he was in the stages of his own mid-life crisis, or "male menopause," around this time. In the documentary Learning to Live With Myself, the singer is quoted in an interview from around the time: "Things that you've enjoyed for years don't seem nearly as important, and you're at war with yourself as to what's happening. 'Why don't I like that anymore? Why do I like this now?' And finally, I think you actually go through a biological change, you just, you become another...Your body is getting ready to die and your mind doesn't agree." According to Daniel Cooper's essay for the 1994 career retrospective Down Every Road, Haggard told music journalist Peter Guralnick that the song derived from having to face an audience five minutes after having heard that hero and friend Lefty Frizzell had died, with Haggard confessing, "You have to go out and smile when you don't feel like smiling, somebody points a camera at you, and you put on that old Instamatic grin. Which is part of the profession, I guess. But sometimes part of the profession makes you feel like a prostitute. That's what that song is about." The song could be an anthem for any touring country singer; George Jones called it his all-time favorite Haggard tune. Hank Williams, Jr. also covered the song. Although never released as a single, the song remained a concert highlight for Haggard.

The distinct collection of songs, which was co-produced by Jimmy Bowen, has a stripped-down sound in the face of the Urban Cowboy movement that was sweeping country music at the time. Haggard's third wife, songwriter Leona Williams, is featured on the album's cover with Haggard.

== Critical reception ==
Professional ratings
Review scores
Source	Rating
AllMusic	4/5 stars
Christgau's Record Guide	B+
The Rolling Stone Album Guide	4/5 stars

Dan Cooper of AllMusic writes that on Serving 190 Proof, "crisis introspection served him well. Possibly the best of his MCA albums..." In 2013 David Cantwell enthused, "Many hardcore Haggard fans will go to bat for 190 Proof as his best, and they might be right. The album also gets cited as Merle's most personal, and there's no doubt that's true." Music critic Robert Christgau wrote: "Its impeccable simplicity and sensitivity gives Haggard's fourth and best album for MCA an autumnal feel..." The Rolling Stone Album Guide considered it Haggard's best MCA album "by far."

== Track listing ==
All songs by Merle Haggard unless otherwise noted:

1. "Footlights" – 4:00
2. "Got Lonely Too Early (This Morning)" – 3:03
3. "Heaven Was a Drink of Wine" (Sanger D. Shafer) – 2:46
4. "Driftwood" – 3:04
5. "I Can't Get Away" – 3:12
6. "Red Bandana" – 2:31
7. "My Own Kind of Hat" (Merle Haggard, Red Lane) – 2:53
8. "I Must Have Done Something Bad" (Lane) – 3:26
9. "I Didn't Mean to Love You" (Haggard, Lane) – 2:30
10. "Sing a Family Song" – 3:13
11. "Roses in the Winter" – 3:54

== Chart positions ==
Year	Chart	Position
1979	Billboard Country albums	17
