= Red Bandana =

Single by Merle Haggard

from the album Serving 190 Proof
- Released: March 18, 1979
- Genre: Country
- Length: 2:31
- Label: MCA
- Songwriter: Merle Haggard
- Producers: Fuzzy Owen, Jimmy Bowen

Merle Haggard singles chronology
"The Bull and the Beaver" (1978)	"Red Bandana" (1979)	"My Own Kind of Hat" (1979)

"Red Bandana" is a song written and recorded by American country music artist Merle Haggard. It was released in March 1979 as the first single from the album Serving 190 Proof. The song reached #4 on the Billboard Hot Country Singles & Tracks chart.

== Content ==
The narrator states that he can't grow up and settle down but he can appreciate the way she looks when she has a red bandana tied around her hair. The lyrics make reference to Kris Kristofferson's "Me and Bobby McGee".

== Charts ==
=== Weekly charts ===
Chart (1979)	Peak position
US Hot Country Songs (Billboard)	4
Canadian RPM Country Tracks	2

=== Year-end charts ===
Chart (1979)	Position
US Hot Country Songs (Billboard)	49
