= Let's Chase Each Other Around the Room =

Single by Merle Haggard

from the album It's All in the Game
- B-side: "You Nearly Lose Your Mind"
- Released: July 14, 1984
- Genre: Country
- Length: 2:48
- Label: Epic
- Songwriter(s): Merle Haggard; Freddy Powers; Sherill Rodgers
- Producer(s): Ray Baker; Merle Haggard

Merle Haggard singles chronology
"Someday When Things Are Good" (1984)	"Let's Chase Each Other Around the Room" (1984)	"A Place to Fall Apart" (1984)

"Let's Chase Each Other Around the Room" is a song co-written and recorded by American country music artist Merle Haggard backed by The Strangers. It was released in July 1984 as the first single from the album It's All in the Game. The song was Haggard's thirty-second number one country single as a solo artist. The single went to number one for one week and spent a total of twelve weeks on the country chart. Haggard wrote the song with Freddy Powers and Sherill Rodgers.

== Personnel ==
- Merle Haggard– vocals, guitar, fiddle

The Strangers:

- Roy Nichols - lead guitar
- Norm Hamlet – steel guitar
- Tiny Moore – fiddle, mandolin
- Mark Yeary – keyboards
- Dennis Hromek - bass
- Biff Adams - drums
- Jim Belken – fiddle
- Don Markham – horns

== Chart performance ==
Chart (1984)	Peak position
US Hot Country Songs (Billboard)	1
Canadian RPM Country Tracks	9
