= Kern River (song) =

Single by Merle Haggard

from the album Kern River
- B-side: "Old Watermill"
- Released: July 1, 1985
- Genre: Country
- Length: 3:23
- Label: Epic
- Songwriter(s): Merle Haggard
- Producer(s): Grady Martin

Merle Haggard singles chronology
"Make Up and Faded Blue Jeans" (1985)	"Kern River" (1985)	"Amber Waves of Grain" (1985)

"Kern River" is a song written and recorded by American country music artist Merle Haggard backed by The Strangers. It was released in July 1985 as the only single and title track from his album Kern River. The song peaked at number 10 on the Billboard Hot Country Singles chart.

== Content ==
The song grimly recounts the story of the singer's girlfriend drowning in the Kern River, California. In the 2013 biography Merle Haggard: The Running Kind writer David Cantwell calls the track "a scary record" that "screamed quiet and startled you alive."

== Personnel ==
- Merle Haggard– vocals, guitar, fiddle

The Strangers:

- Roy Nichols - guitar
- Norm Hamlet - steel guitar
- Tiny Moore - fiddle, mandolin
- Mark Yeary - keyboards
- Dennis Hromek - bass
- Biff Adams - drums
- Jim Belkin - fiddle

== Chart performance ==
Chart (1985)	Peak position
US Hot Country Songs (Billboard)	10
Canadian RPM Country Tracks	10

== Covers ==
"Kern River" was covered by Dave Alvin on his 2006 album West of the West, and by Emmylou Harris on her 2008 album All I Intended to Be.
