= The Peer Sessions =

Studio album by Merle Haggard
- Released: May 21, 2002
- Recorded: 1996–1999
- Genre: Country
- Length: 38:14
- Label: Audium
- Producer: Merle Haggard

Merle Haggard chronology
Roots, Volume 1 (2001)	The Peer Sessions (2002)	Haggard Like Never Before (2003)

The Peer Sessions is the fifty-fourth studio album by American recording artist Merle Haggard released on the Audium label in 2002.

== Background ==
The old pop and country standards recorded for this collection were taken from the Ralph S. Peer publishing catalogue. They were recorded between 1996 and 1998 when Haggard was still with Curb Records. Fellow Country Music Hall of Fame member Roy Horton worked with Haggard in selecting the tunes, and the pair came up with 12 songs from the pens of Jimmie Rodgers, Jimmie Davis, Floyd Tillman, and Tommy Duncan, among others.

== Reception ==
Professional ratings
Review scores
Source	Rating
Allmusic	3.5/5 stars

Zac Johnson of AllMusic wrote: "Overall, The Peer Sessions work both as an interesting collection of classic country songs and a solid individual work."

== Track listing ==
1. "Peach Picking Time in Georgia" (Jimmie Rodgers, Clayton McMichen) – 3:51
2. "If It's Wrong to Love You" (Bonnie Dodd, Charles Mitchell) – 3:14
3. "Sweethearts or Strangers" (Jimmie Davis, Lou Wayne) – 2:52
4. "Put Me in Your Pocket" (W. Lee O'Daniel) – 3:51
5. "Anniversary Blue Yodel" (Jimmie Rodgers, Doc Watson) – 3:53
6. "Shackles and Chains" (Jimmie Davis) – 2:25
7. "Miss the Mississippi and You" (Jimmie Rodgers, Bill Halley) – 3:01
8. "It Makes No Difference Now" (Jimmie Davis, Floyd Tillman) – 4:03
9. "Whippin' That Old T.B." (Jimmie Rodgers) – 3:13
10. "Hang on to the Memories" (Jimmie Davis) – 3:06
11. "I Love You So Much it Hurts" (Floyd Tillman) – 3:25
12. "Time Changes Everything" (Bob Wills, Tommy Duncan) – 3:20

== Personnel ==
- Merle Haggard – vocals, guitar
- Norm Hamlet – dobro, pedal steel guitar
- Biff Adams – drums
- Don Markham – saxophone, trumpet
- Owen Bradley – piano
- Eddie Curtis – bass
- The Anita Kerr Singers – background vocals
- Abe Manuel, Jr. – guitar, accordion, fiddle, harmonica, vocal harmony
- Joe Manuel – bass, guitar
- Grady Martin – guitar
- Randy Mason – guitar
- Redd Volkaert – guitar
- Pete Wade – guitar
- Hal Rugg – pedal steel guitar
- Oleg Schramm – piano
- Buddy Spicher – fiddle
