= Natural High (Merle Haggard song) =

Single by Merle Haggard

from the album It's All in the Game
- B-side: "I Never Go Home Anymore"
- Released: March 16, 1985
- Genre: Country
- Length: 3:05
- Label: Epic
- Songwriter(s): Freddy Powers
- Producer(s): Ray Baker; Merle Haggard

Merle Haggard singles chronology
"A Place to Fall Apart" (1984)	"Natural High" (1985)	"Make Up and Faded Blue Jeans" (1985)

"Natural High" is a song written by Freddy Powers, and recorded by American country music artist Merle Haggard backed by The Strangers. It was released in March 1985 as the third single from the album It's All in the Game. The song was Haggard's thirty-third number one single on the country chart as a solo artist. The single featuring harmony vocals by Janie Fricke went to number one for one week and spent a total of twelve weeks on the country chart.

== Personnel ==
- Merle Haggard– vocals, guitar, fiddle

The Strangers:

- Roy Nichols - lead guitar
- Norm Hamlet – steel guitar
- Tiny Moore – fiddle, mandolin
- Mark Yeary – keyboards
- Dennis Hromek - bass
- Biff Adams - drums
- Jim Belken – fiddle
- Don Markham – horns

== Charts ==
=== Weekly charts ===
Chart (1985)	Peak position
US Hot Country Songs (Billboard)	1
Canadian RPM Country Tracks	2

=== Year-end charts ===
Chart (1985)	Position
US Hot Country Songs (Billboard)	47
