= You, Babe =

1972 song written by Sanger D. Shafer

Single by Lefty Frizzell
- B-side: "When It Rains the Blues"
- Released: August 12, 1972
- Genre: Country
- Label: Columbia
- Songwriter: Sanger D. Shafer

Lefty Frizzell singles chronology
"Watermelon Time in Georgia" (1970)	"You, Babe" (1972)	"I Can't Get Over You to Save My Life" (1973)

"You Babe"

Single by Merle Haggard

from the album Chill Factor
- B-side: "Thirty Again"
- Released: November 19, 1988
- Genre: Country
- Length: 3:50
- Label: Epic Records
- Songwriter: Sanger D. Shafer
- Producers: Ken Seusov, Merle Haggard

Merle Haggard singles chronology
"We Never Touch at All" (1988)	"You Babe" (1988)	"5:01 Blues" (1989)

"You, Babe" is a song recorded by American country music artist Lefty Frizzell. It was released in August 1972 as a single only. The song reached #59 on the Billboard Hot Country Singles & Tracks chart. The song was written by Sanger D. Shafer.

== Cover versions ==
The song recorded in 1988 by American country music Merle Haggard backed by The Strangers under the title "You Babe". Haggard's was released in November of that year as the fourth single from the album Chill Factor. The song reached #23 on the Billboard Hot Country Singles & Tracks chart.

== Chart performance ==
=== Lefty Frizzell ===
Chart (1972)	Peak position
US Hot Country Songs (Billboard)	59

=== Merle Haggard ===
Chart (1988–1989)	Peak position
US Hot Country Songs (Billboard)	23
