= Hag: The Best of Merle Haggard =

Compilation album by Merle Haggard
- Released: 2006
- Recorded: 1966–2005
- Genre: Country
- Length: 77:02
- Label: Capitol
- Producer: Various

Hag: The Best of Merle Haggard is a compilation album by American country singer Merle Haggard, released in 2006.

== Critical reception ==
Professional ratings
Review scores
Source	Rating
AllMusic	5/5 stars
Pitchfork	8.8

Thom Jurek of AllMusic stated that the album "may be the best single-disc representation of the man's music out there", calling the sound and the package "phenomenal" and concluding, "This is sure to turn anyone who is curious into a Haggard fan. And for those who have everything, this is just a killer mix." Stephen M. Deusner of Pitchfork said that it's a good introduction for those who are new to Haggard's work.

== Track listing ==
No.	Title	Length
1.	"The Bottle Let Me Down"	2:47
2.	"Branded Man"	3:06
3.	"Sing Me Back Home"	2:48
4.	"The Legend of Bonnie And Clyde"	2:04
5.	"Today I Started Loving You Again"	2:21
6.	"Mama Tried"	2:12
7.	"I Take a Lot of Pride in What I Am"	2:47
8.	"I'm Bringin' Home Good News"	2:47
9.	"Hungry Eyes"	3:27
10.	"Workin' Man Blues"	2:34
11.	"Silver Wings"	2:43
12.	"Okie From Muskogee"	2:42
13.	"The Fightin' Side of Me"	2:52
14.	"Someday We'll Look Back"	2:29
15.	"If We Make It Through December"	2:41
16.	"Things Aren't Funny Anymore"	2:41
17.	"Honky Tonk Night Time Man"	2:39
18.	"Old Man From The Mountain"	2:20
19.	"Living With The Shades Pulled Down"	2:58
20.	"I Think I'll Just Stay Here and Drink"	4:31
21.	"Big City"	3:00
22.	"Pancho and Lefty" (with Willie Nelson)	4:47
23.	"I'm leaving Now" (with Johnny Cash)	3:07
24.	"Runaway Mama"	4:08
25.	"That's the News"	2:34
26.	"She Ain't Hooked On Me No More" (with Toby Keith)	3:36

== Personnel ==
- Merle Haggard – vocals, guitar

The Strangers

- Roy Nichols – lead guitar
- Norman Hamlet – steel guitar
- Tiny Moore – mandolin, fiddle
- Eldon Shamblin – guitar
- Ralph Mooney – steel guitar
- Gene Price – bass
- Gordon Terry – fiddle
- Bonnie Owens – vocals
- Ronnie Reno – guitar
- Bobby Wayne – guitar
- Marcia Nichols – guitar
- Clint Strong – guitar
- Mark Yeary – piano
- George French – piano
- Dennis Hromek – bass
- James Tittle – bass
- Johnny Meeks – bass
- Jerry Ward – bass
- Wayne Durham – bass
- Biff Adam – drums
- Eddie Burris – drums
- Don Markham – saxophone
- Jimmy Belkin – fiddle
- Gary Church – horns
