= A Better Love Next Time =

Single by Merle Haggard

from the album 5:01 Blues
- B-side: "Losin' in Las Vegas"
- Released: July 22, 1989
- Genre: Country
- Length: 2:42
- Label: Epic
- Songwriters: Johnny Christopher, Bobby Wood
- Producers: Merle Haggard, Mark Yeary

Merle Haggard singles chronology
"5:01 Blues" (1989)	"A Better Love Next Time" (1989)	"If You Want to Be My Woman" (1989)

"A Better Love Next Time" is a song written by Johnny Christopher and Bobby Wood, and recorded by American country music artist Merle Haggard backed by the Strangers. It was released in July 1989 as the second single from the album 5:01 Blues. The song reached number four on the Billboard Hot Country Singles & Tracks chart. It was Haggard's last top ten hit. It was co-produced by Mark Yeary, keyboardist of the Strangers.

== Personnel ==
- Merle Haggard – vocals, guitar

The Strangers:

- Norm Hamlet – pedal steel guitar
- Clint Strong – guitar
- Bobby Wayne – guitar
- Mark Yeary – hammond organ, piano, electric piano
- Jimmy Belkin – fiddle, strings
- Biff Adams – drums
- Don Markham – saxophone, trumpet
- Gary Church – cornet, trombone

== Charts ==
Chart (1989)	Peak position
Canada Country Singles (RPM)	10
US Hot Country Songs (Billboard)	4

=== Year-end charts ===
Chart (1989)	Position
Canada Country Tracks (RPM)	100
US Country Songs (Billboard)	47
