= Cabin in the Hills =

Studio album by Merle Haggard
- Released: May 1, 2001
- Genre: Country
- Length: 32:18
- Label: Compendia
- Producer: Merle Haggard

Merle Haggard chronology
| If I Could Only Fly (2000) | Cabin in the Hills (2001) | Two Old Friends (2001) |

Cabin in the Hills is the fifty-first studio album by American recording artist Merle Haggard released on May 1, 2001.

== Background ==
After his 2000 comeback album If I Could Only Fly, Haggard released two gospel albums on the same day on May 1, 2001: Cabin in the Hills and Two Old Friends with Albert Brumley, Jr. The former includes a mix of traditional songs arranged by Haggard as well as new Haggard originals. It also features the Iris Dement song "Shores of Jordan". Haggard produced the collection himself and is joined by Strangers steel guitarist Norman Hamlet and singers Porter Wagoner and Bonnie Owens.

== Reception ==
Professional ratings
Review scores
| Source | Rating |
|---|---|
| Allmusic | 3/5 stars |

Travis Dragaset of AllMusic wrote: "Haggard's own spiritual evolution, which took root while in solitary confinement at San Quentin prison, lends grit and intrigue to this highly listenable set."

== Track listing ==
1. "Life's Railway to Heaven" (W.S. Stevenson, Charlie Tillman) – 3:21
2. "A Cabin in the Hills" (Merle Haggard) – 3:17
3. "What Will It Be Like" (Haggard) – 2:48
4. "Farther Along" (Traditional) – 4:12
5. "Precious Lord Take My Hand" – 3:07
6. "Apart for a While" (Haggard) – 3:10
7. "Love Lifted Me" (Traditional) – 3:29
8. "Shores of Jordan" (Iris Dement) – 3:38
9. "Lord Don't Give Up on Me" (Haggard) – 2:58
10. "This World Is Not My Home" (Traditional; arranged by Albert Brumley, Jr.) – 2:18

== Personnel ==
- Merle Haggard – vocals, guitar
- Norm Hamlet – dobro, pedal steel guitar
- Biff Adam – drums
- Don Markham – trumpet
- Bonnie Owens – vocals
- Porter Wagoner – vocals
- Ray McDonald – vocals
- Doug Colosio – keyboards
- Eddie Curtis – bass
- Theresa Lane Haggard Vocals
- Abe Manuel, Jr. – guitar, harmonica
- Joe Manuel – guitar
- Randy Mason – drums, guitar
- Redd Volkaert – guitar
