= A Working Man Can't Get Nowhere Today (song) =

Single by Merle Haggard and The Strangers

from the album A Working Man Can't Get Nowhere Today
- Released: August 29, 1977
- Genre: Country
- Length: 2:55
- Label: MCA
- Songwriter(s): Merle Haggard
- Producer(s): Ken Nelson, Fuzzy Owen

Merle Haggard and The Strangers singles chronology
"Ramblin' Fever" (1977)	"A Working Man Can't Get Nowhere Today" (1977)	"From Graceland to the Promised Land" (1977)

"A Working Man Can't Get Nowhere Today" is a song written and recorded by American country music artist Merle Haggard and The Strangers. It was released in August 1977 as the lead single from the album of the same name, A Working Man Can't Get Nowhere Today. The song peaked at number 16 on the U.S. country singles chart and at number 8 on the Canadian country singles chart.

== Personnel ==
- Merle Haggard– vocals, guitar

The Strangers:

- Roy Nichols – lead guitar
- Norman Hamlet – steel guitar, dobro
- Tiny Moore – mandolin
- Ronnie Reno – guitar
- Mark Yeary – piano
- James Tittle – bass
- Biff Adam – drums
- Don Markham – saxophone

== Chart performance ==
Chart (1977)	Peak position
US Hot Country Songs (Billboard)	16
Canadian RPM Country Tracks	8
