= I Wish I Was Santa Claus =

Studio album by Merle Haggard
- Released: October 26, 2004
- Genre: Country, Christmas
- Length: 30:55
- Label: Smith Music Group
- Producer: Merle Haggard, Lou Bradley

Merle Haggard chronology
Haggard Like Never Before (2003)	I Wish I Was Santa Claus (2004)	Unforgettable (2004)

I Wish I Was Santa Claus is the fifty-sixth studio album by American country music singer and songwriter Merle Haggard. It was released on October 26, 2004, on the Smith Music Group label.

== Reception ==
The AllMusic review states "It sounds pretty much as you'd expect, especially given the cover art, but this collision of Bakersfield country music and traditional Christmas material has a certain charm..."

== Track listing ==
1. "El Niño" (Moore, Willie Nelson) – 2:36
2. "I Wish I Were Santa Claus" (Raymond McDonald) – 2:33
3. "Christmas in Cabo San Lucas" (Colosio, Dyer, Joss, Williams) – 3:15
4. "White Christmas" (Irving Berlin) – 3:18
5. "Jingle Bells" (James Lord Pierpont) – 2:16
6. "Santa Claus Is Coming to Town" (John Frederick Coots, Haven Gillespie) – 2:15
7. "Blue Christmas" (Billy Hayes, Jay Johnson) – 2:46
8. "I'll Be Home for Christmas" (Kent Gannon, James Gannon, Buck Ram) – 2:58
9. "Santa Claus & Popcorn" (Haggard) – 2:06
10. "Rudolph the Red-Nosed Reindeer" (Johnny Marks) – 2:34
11. "Silver Bells" (Ray Evans, Jay Livingston) – 3:37
12. "If We Make It Through December" (Haggard) – 2:41

== Personnel ==
- Merle Haggard – vocals, guitar
- Don Markham – horn, trumpet, background vocals
- April Anderson – background vocals
- Theresa Lane Haggard – background vocals
- Johnnie Barber – drums
- Doug Colosio – piano, background vocals
- Scott Joss – fiddle, guitar, background vocals
- Abe Manuel Jr. – guitar
- Joe Manuel – guitar
- Randy Mason – guitar
- Norman Stevens – guitar, background vocals
- Kevin Williams – bass, background vocals
