= We Never Touch at All =

Single by Merle Haggard

from the album Chill Factor
- B-side: "Thanking the Good Lord"
- Released: July 9, 1988
- Genre: Country
- Length: 3:42
- Label: Epic
- Songwriter(s): Hank Cochran
- Producer(s): Ken Seusov, Merle Haggard

Merle Haggard singles chronology
"Chill Factor" (1988)	"We Never Touch at All" (1988)	"You Babe" (1988)

"We Never Touch at All" is a song recorded by American country music artist Merle Haggard backed by The Strangers. It was released in July 1988 as the third single from the album Chill Factor. The song reached number 22 on the Billboard Hot Country Singles & Tracks chart. The song was written by Hank Cochran.

== Chart performance ==
Chart (1988)	Peak position
US Hot Country Songs (Billboard)	22
