= It's Been a Great Afternoon =

Single by Merle Haggard

from the album I'm Always on a Mountain When I Fall
- Released: July 24, 1978
- Genre: Country
- Length: 2:50
- Label: MCA
- Songwriter(s): Merle Haggard
- Producer(s): Fuzzy Owen; Hank Cochran

Merle Haggard singles chronology
"I'm Always on a Mountain When I Fall" (1978)	"It's Been a Great Afternoon" (1978)	"The Bull and the Beaver" (1978)

"It's Been a Great Afternoon" is a song written and recorded by American country music artist Merle Haggard. It was released in July 1978 as the second single from the album I'm Always on a Mountain When I Fall. The song reached #2 on the Billboard Hot Country Singles & Tracks chart.

== Chart performance ==
Chart (1978)	Peak position
US Hot Country Songs (Billboard)	2
Canadian RPM Country Tracks	1
