= Twinkle, Twinkle Lucky Star =

Single by Merle Haggard

from the album Chill Factor
- B-side: "I Don't Have Any Love Around"
- Released: November 21, 1987
- Genre: Country
- Length: 3:22
- Label: Epic
- Songwriter(s): Merle Haggard
- Producer(s): Merle Haggard; Ken Suesov

Merle Haggard singles chronology
"Almost Persuaded" (1987)	"Twinkle, Twinkle Lucky Star" (1987)	"Chill Factor" (1988)

"Twinkle, Twinkle Lucky Star" is a song written and recorded by American country music artist Merle Haggard backed by The Strangers. It was released in November 1987 as the first single from the album Chill Factor. The song was the last of Haggard's thirty-four number one singles as a solo artist. The single went to number one for one week and spent fifteen weeks on the country chart.

== Charts ==
=== Weekly charts ===
Chart (1987–1988)	Peak position
US Hot Country Songs (Billboard)	1
Canadian RPM Country Tracks	1

=== Year-end charts ===
Chart (1988)	Position
US Hot Country Songs (Billboard)	42
