= If You Want to Be My Woman =

Single by Merle Haggard

from the album 5:01 Blues
- B-side: "Someday We'll Know"
- Released: December 1989
- Genre: Country
- Length: 2:42
- Label: Epic
- Songwriter: Merle Haggard
- Producers: Merle Haggard; Mark Yeary

Merle Haggard singles chronology
| "A Better Love Next Time" (1989) | "If You Want to Be My Woman" (1989) | "Broken Friend" (1990) |

"If You Want to Be My Woman" is a song written and originally recorded by American country music artist Merle Haggard backed by The Strangers on Haggard's 1967 album I'm a Lonesome Fugitive. Haggard re-recorded the song in 1989 and released it in December as the third single from his album 5:01 Blues. The song peaked at number 23 on the Billboard Hot Country Singles & Tracks chart and reached number 15 on the RPM Country Tracks chart in Canada.

The song was Haggard's last top-40 country hit; like most classic country artists, Haggard's chart career was severely damaged by changes in the country industry that hit in the early 1990s. It was co-produced by Mark Yeary, keyboardist of The Strangers.

== Personnel ==
- Merle Haggard– vocals, guitar

The Strangers:

- Norm Hamlet – pedal steel guitar
- Clint Strong – guitar
- Bobby Wayne – guitar
- Mark Yeary – hammond organ, piano, electric piano
- Jimmy Belkin – fiddle, strings
- Biff Adams – drums
- Don Markham – saxophone, trumpet
- Gary Church – cornet, trombone

== Chart performance ==
| Chart (1989–1990) | Peak position |
|---|---|
| Canada Country Singles (RPM) | 15 |
| US Hot Country Songs (Billboard) | 23 |
