= I Had a Beautiful Time =

Single by Merle Haggard

from the album A Friend in California
- B-side: "This Time I Really Do"
- Released: January 25, 1986
- Genre: Country
- Length: 3:03
- Label: Epic
- Songwriter(s): Merle Haggard
- Producer(s): Merle Haggard, Ron "Snake" Reynolds

Merle Haggard singles chronology
"Amber Waves of Grain" (1985)	"I Had a Beautiful Time" (1986)	"A Friend in California" (1986)

"I Had a Beautiful Time" is a song written and recorded by American country music artist Merle Haggard backed by The Strangers. It was released in January 1986 as the first single from the album A Friend in California. The song reached number 5 on the Billboard Hot Country Singles & Tracks chart.

== Personnel ==
- Merle Haggard– vocals, guitar, fiddle

The Strangers:

- Roy Nichols – guitar
- Norman Hamlet – steel guitar, dobro
- Clint Strong – guitar
- Mark Yeary – keyboards
- Dennis Hromek – bass
- Biff Adam – drums
- Jimmy Belken – fiddle
- Don Markham – trumpet, saxophone
- Gary Church – trombone, trumpet

== Chart performance ==
Chart (1986)	Peak position
US Hot Country Songs (Billboard)	5
Canadian RPM Country Tracks	4
