= Running Kind =

1978 single by Merle Haggard

Single by Merle Haggard and The Strangers

from the album A Working Man Can't Get Nowhere Today
- B-side: "Making Believe"
- Released: January 9, 1978
- Genre: Country
- Length: 3:00
- Label: Capitol
- Songwriter: Merle Haggard
- Producers: Ken Nelson, Fuzzy Owen

Merle Haggard and The Strangers singles chronology
"From Graceland to the Promised Land" (1977)	"Running Kind" (1978)	"I'm Always on a Mountain When I Fall" (1978)

"The Running Kind"

Single by Radney Foster

from the album Mama's Hungry Eyes: A Tribute to Merle Haggard
- B-side: "Silver Wings" (Pam Tillis)
- Released: 1994
- Genre: Country
- Length: 4:23
- Label: Arista Nashville
- Songwriter: Merle Haggard

Radney Foster singles chronology
"Labor of Love" (1994)	"The Running Kind" (1994)	"Willin' to Walk" (1995)

"Running Kind" is a song written and recorded by American country music artist Merle Haggard and The Strangers. It was released in January 1978 as the second and final single from the album, A Working Man Can't Get Nowhere Today. The song peaked at number 12 on the U.S. country singles chart and at number 10 on the Canadian country singles chart. The song was later covered by Radney Foster for the Haggard tribute album Mama's Hungry Eyes: A Tribute to Merle Haggard. Foster's version was released as a single in 1994 and peaked at number 64 on the U.S. country singles chart. Johnny Cash also covered the song with Tom Petty on the Unearthed box set.

== Personnel ==
- Merle Haggard– vocals, guitar

The Strangers:

- Roy Nichols – lead guitar
- Norman Hamlet – steel guitar, dobro
- Tiny Moore – mandolin
- Ronnie Reno – guitar
- Mark Yeary – piano
- James Tittle – bass
- Biff Adam – drums
- Don Markham – saxophone

== Chart performance ==
=== Merle Haggard ===
Chart (1978)	Peak position
US Hot Country Songs (Billboard)	12
Canadian RPM Country Tracks	10

=== Radney Foster ===
Chart (1994)	Peak position
US Hot Country Songs (Billboard)	64
