= 5:01 Blues =

Single by Merle Haggard

from the album 5:01 Blues
- B-side: "Man from Another Time"
- Released: April 8, 1989
- Genre: Country
- Length: 3:14
- Label: Epic
- Songwriters: Michael Garvin, Jeff Tweel
- Producers: Merle Haggard, Mark Yeary

Merle Haggard singles chronology
"You Babe" (1988)	"5:01 Blues" (1989)	"A Better Love Next Time" (1989)

"5:01 Blues" is a song written by Michael Garvin and Jeff Tweel, and recorded by American country music artist Merle Haggard backed by The Strangers. It was released in April 1989 as the first single and title track from the album 5:01 Blues. The song reached number 18 on the Billboard Hot Country Singles & Tracks chart. From the mid-1980s to the early 1990s the Levi Strauss company advertised their button-fly 501 jeans heavily on MTV and during prime time on the major TV broadcast networks, so there is a strong possibility that this song and the album title are a play on the Levi's advertising campaign. It was co-produced by Mark Yeary, keyboardist of The Strangers.

== Chart performance ==
Chart (1989)	Peak position
Canada Country Singles (RPM)	14
US Hot Country Songs (Billboard)	18
