= 1996 (Merle Haggard album) =

Studio album by Merle Haggard
- Released: January 23, 1996
- Recorded: 1995
- Genre: Country
- Length: 32:05
- Label: Curb
- Producer: Lou Bradley, Abe Manuel, Jr., Merle Haggard

Merle Haggard chronology
1994 (1994)	1996 (1996)	If I Could Only Fly (2000)

Singles from 1996
- 1. "Truck Driver's Blues" Released: May 13, 1996

1996 is the forty-ninth studio album by American country singer Merle Haggard, released in 1996. It was his last studio album on the Curb Records label, and was considered something of a return to form for Haggard despite poor sales.

== Background ==
Despite good reviews, 1996 was the first studio album in Haggard's career not to chart. Curb's indifference to the release is commonly cited as a major factor in the LP's commercial failure, with country music critic, journalist and historian Michael McCall summarizing the situation in his AllMusic review of the album: "His record company didn't send promotional copies to reviewers until the album had been out for nearly a month, and no advertising or promotion has been devoted to the music. The album artwork and cover reflect this lack of care: the title, 1996, is boxed on the cover like a tomb, exactly like Hag's last set, 1994." In his 2013 Haggard biography The Running Kind David Cantwell adds, "To be a singer and a writer with next to zero chance of being heard was maddening enough. That 1996 boasted several strong new originals only compounded the frustration." On "Beer Can Hill," a song that celebrates his Bakersfield roots, Haggard is joined by Dwight Yoakam and fellow country legend Buck Owens. 1996 also features contributions from John Anderson, Iris Dement, and Johnny Paycheck.

== Reception ==
Professional ratings
Review scores
Source	Rating
Allmusic	4/5 stars

Michael McCall of AllMusic writes, "Recorded in Bakersfield, Haggard's album takes a jaunty yet melancholy look at a middle-aged man's concerns... The album's standout is a cover of Iris Dement's great 'No Time to Cry,' which Haggard fills with aged, tired wisdom."

== Track listing ==
1. "Sin City Blues" (Merle Haggard, Theresa Lane Haggard, Joe Manuel) – 2:28
2. "No Time to Cry" (Iris Dement) – 4:25
3. "Beer Can Hill" (Haggard, Abe Manuel, Jr.) – 3:16
4. "Truck Drivers' Blues" (Haggard, Tim Howard) – 3:04
5. "Too Many Highways" (Haggard, Max D. Barnes) – 2:59
6. "Five Days a Week" (Haggard) – 2:13
7. "Kids Get Lonesome Too" (Haggard, Lou Bradley) – 3:00
8. "If Anyone Ought to Know" (Haggard, Bonnie Owens) – 3:03
9. "Untanglin' My Mind" (Haggard, Clint Black) – 4:09
10. "Winds of Change" (Haggard, Terry Hardesty) – 3:28

== Personnel ==
- Merle Haggard – vocals, guitar
- Norm Hamlet – steel guitar, dobro
- Biff Adams – drums
- Mark Yeary – piano
- Don Markham – trumpet, saxophone, penny whistle
- Jim Belkins – violin
- Clint Strong – guitar
- John Anderson – vocals
- Dwight Yoakam – vocals
- Buck Owens – vocals
- Johnny Paycheck – vocals
- Seymour Duncan – guitar
- Eddie Curtis – bass
- Iris DeMent – piano
- Hilton Reed – guitar, bass, background vocals
- Oleg Schramm – piano
- Dawn Sears – background vocals
- Leland Sklar – bass
- Bob Teague – vocals
- Bobby Wood – electric piano
- Terry Hardesty – guitar
- Tim Howard – guitar
- Abe Manuel, Jr. – guitar, fiddle, percussion, accordion, harmony vocals
- Joe Manuel – guitar, background vocals

Production notes:

- Lou Bradley – producer, engineer
- Merle Haggard – producer
- Abe Manuel, Jr. – producer
