= From Graceland to the Promised Land =

Single by Merle Haggard

from the album My Farewell to Elvis
- B-side: "Are You Lonesome Tonight?"
- Released: October 3, 1977
- Genre: Country
- Length: 2:28
- Label: MCA
- Songwriter(s): Merle Haggard
- Producer(s): Fuzzy Owen

Merle Haggard singles chronology
"A Working Man Can't Get Nowhere Today" (1977)	"From Graceland to the Promised Land" (1977)	"Running Kind" (1978)

"From Graceland to the Promised Land" is a song written and recorded by American country music artist Merle Haggard. It was released in October 1977 as the only single from the album My Farewell to Elvis. The song reached number 4 on the Billboard Hot Country Singles & Tracks chart.

== Content ==
The song is a tribute to Elvis Presley.

== Chart performance ==
Chart (1977–1978)	Peak position
US Hot Country Songs (Billboard)	4
US Billboard Hot 100	58
Canadian RPM Country Tracks	3
Canadian RPM Top Singles	55
