= Chicago Wind =

Studio album by Merle Haggard
- Released: October 25, 2005
- Genre: Country
- Length: 40:46
- Label: Capitol Records Nashville
- Producers: Mike Post; Jimmy Bowen

Merle Haggard chronology
| Unforgettable (2004) | Chicago Wind (2005) | Kickin' Out the Footlights...Again (2006) |

Chicago Wind is the fifty-eighth studio album by American country singer and songwriter Merle Haggard, released in 2005. It peaked at number 54 on the Billboard Top Country Albums chart. A video was made for the track "America First".

== Critical reception ==
Professional ratings
Review scores
| Source | Rating |
|---|---|
| Allmusic | 4/5 stars |
| Robert Christgau | (***) |
| Freight Train Boogie | 3.5/5 stars |

Stephen Thomas Erlewine of AllMusic praised the album, writing "Chicago Wind is not the rough and rowdy honky tonk album some fans have been hankering for, but it is a poetic, thoughtful and empathic one that once more displays why Merle Haggard is the living king of country music."

== Track listing ==
All tracks composed by Merle Haggard; except where indicated

1. "Chicago Wind" – 4:08
2. "Where's All the Freedom" – 3:22
3. "White Man Singin' the Blues" – 3:47
4. "Leavin's Not the Only Way to Go" (Roger Miller) – 3:38
5. "What I've Been Meaning to Say" – 2:36
6. "Mexico" – 3:11
7. "Honky Tonk Man" (Dewayne Blackwell) – 3:04
8. "America First" – 2:43
9. "It Always Will Be" (Willie Nelson) – 4:01
10. "I Still Can't Say Goodbye" (Robert Blinn, James Moore) – 3:38
11. "Some of Us Fly" (with Toby Keith) – 6:38

== Personnel ==
- Merle Haggard – vocals, guitar
- Don Markham – trumpet
- Thom Bresh – acoustic guitar
- Doug Colosio – keyboards
- Shannon Forrest – drums
- Scott Joss – fiddle, mandolin
- Leland Sklar – bass
- Brent Mason – electric guitar
- Alti Ovarsson – piano
- Herb Pedersen – banjo, background vocals
- Mike Post – guitar, Fender Rhodes, Wurlitzer
- Michael Rhodes – bass
- John "JR" Robinson – drums
- Billy Joe Walker, Jr. – acoustic and electric guitar
- Biff Watson – acoustic guitar
- Gabe Witcher – fiddle
- Reggie Young – electric guitar

== Chart performance ==
| Chart (2005) | Peak position |
|---|---|
| U.S. Billboard Top Country Albums | 54 |
