= 5:01 Blues (album) =

Studio album by Merle Haggard
- Released: 1989
- Recorded: Talley Studios, Eleven Eleven Studio
- Genre: Country
- Length: 30:05
- Label: Epic
- Producer: Merle Haggard, Ken Suesov, Mark Yeary

Merle Haggard chronology
Chill Factor (1987)	5:01 Blues (1989)	Blue Jungle (1990)

Singles from 5:01 Blues
- 1. "5:01 Blues" Released: April 8, 1989; 2. "A Better Love Next Time" Released: July 22, 1989; 3. "If You Want to Be My Woman" Released: December 1989; 4. "Broken Friend" Released: March 1990

5:01 Blues is the forty-sixth studio album by American recording artist Merle Haggard, with backing by The Strangers. It was released in 1989 and was his last studio album on the Epic label. It peaked at number 28 on the Billboard country albums chart. It was co-produced by Mark Yeary, keyboardist of The Strangers.

== History ==
Although Haggard's tenure with Epic had been a success in its first three years, producing twelve top-ten hits (with nine of them going to number one), his relationship with the label deteriorated in the latter part of the 1980s. 5:01 Blues was to be his last studio album with Epic. The single, "A Better Love Next Time", became Haggard's last top 5 solo single, while two other singles, "If You Want to Be My Woman" and the title track, failed to crack the top 20 on the country charts. A final single, the opener "Broken Friend" did not chart. "Someday We'll Know" was co-written by Haggard and Teresa Lane, who later become Haggard's fifth wife.

== Critical reception ==
Professional ratings
Review scores
Source	Rating
AllMusic	3/5 stars
Robert Christgau	C+

Stephen Thomas Erlewine of AllMusic deems the album "an amiable, enjoyable set," but concludes that "it's fairly clear things are beginning to wrap up between the singer and the label... he's on his own, working with Mark Yeary and Ken Suesov, just relaxing through a set of laid-back ballads and blues." Music critic Robert Christgau wrote "A slight improvement over 1988's feckless Out Among the Stars, due mostly to a formulaic title tune Hag didn't write. But if he thinks he isn't getting away with shit, he needs a shrink."

== Track listing ==
No.	Title	Writer(s)	Length
1.	"Broken Friend"	Merle Haggard	2:41
2.	"Losin' in Las Vegas"	Raymond McDonald	3:36
3.	"5:01 Blues"	Michael Garvin, Jeff Tweel	3:14
4.	"Someday We'll Know"	Haggard, Theresa Lane	3:15
5.	"Wouldn't That Be Something"	Haggard, Freddy Powers	3:01
6.	"Sea of Heartbreak"	Hal David, Paul Hampton	2:51
7.	"A Better Love Next Time"	Johnny Christopher, Bobby Wood	2:42
8.	"If You Want to Be My Woman"	Haggard	2:42
9.	"A Thousand Lies Ago"	Haggard	3:54
10.	"Somewhere Down the Line"	Haggard, Powers	2:36

== Personnel ==
- Merle Haggard – lead vocals, electric guitar

The Strangers:

- Norm Hamlet – pedal steel guitar
- Clint Strong – acoustic guitar, electric guitar
- Bobby Wayne – acoustic guitar, electric guitar
- Mark Yeary – hammond organ, piano, electric piano
- Jimmy Belkin – fiddle, strings
- Biff Adam – drums
- Don Markham – saxophone, trumpet
- Gary Church – cornet, trombone

with:

- Eldon Shamblin – electric guitar
- Bonnie Owens – background vocals

and:

- Billy Shaw – electric guitar
- Reggie Young – electric guitar
- Steve Gibson – acoustic guitar, electric guitar
- Johnny Christopher – acoustic guitar, background vocals
- Mike Leech – bass guitar
- Jerry Carrigan – drum programming, percussion
- Gene Chrisman – drums
- Tom Roady – percussion
- Wendell Jr. – percussion
- Bobby Wood – synthesizer, background vocals
- Susan Boyd – background vocals
- Joe Chemay – background vocals
- Jim Haas – background vocals
- Jon Joice – background vocals
