= Kern River (album) =

Studio album by Merle Haggard
- Released: 1985
- Recorded: Eleven Eleven Studio, Nashville
- Genre: Country
- Length: 30:08
- Label: Epic
- Producer: Merle Haggard (all tracks), Ray Baker (tracks 5 & 8), Grady Martin (all tracks except 5 & 8)

Merle Haggard chronology
It's All in the Game (1984)	Kern River (1985)	Amber Waves of Grain (1985)

Singles from Kern River
- 1. "Kern River" Released: July 1, 1985

Kern River is the fortieth studio album by American recording artist Merle Haggard backed by The Strangers, released in 1985. It reached number 8 on the Billboard country albums chart.

== Background ==
The album is best remembered for its title track, which hit the Top 10 in the summer of 1985. The song also played a part in Haggard's souring relationship with his record label. In his 1999 memoir My House of Memories, the singer recalls being summoned to CBS in Nashville with Ray Benson in tow where an executive casually remarked, "Well, I still don't like 'Kern River,'" and suggested, despite Haggard's run of hits in the first half of the decade, that he listen to songs by a group of assembled young songwriters Haggard exploded, saying to the executive, "Go over there and pick up one of those guitars. Show me a chicken claw D. Sing me your latest song," and later recalled, "To this day, my blood pressure rises when I tell the story." The LP alternates between smooth, country/pop melancholy, such as "You Don't Love Me Anymore" and "There's Somebody Else On Your Mind," and nostalgic nods to big band western swing like "Old Watermill" and his cover of Louis Armstrong's "Big Butter and Egg Man." The LP also contains a rendition of the 1980 Dolly Parton #1 "Old Flames Can't Hold a Candle to You." The version of "Natural High" found on this album differs from the one on Haggard's previous album It's All in the Game in that it features Janie Fricke on background vocals. Haggard had originally recorded "I Wonder Where I'll Find You at Tonight" on his 1972 album It's Not Love (But It's Not Bad).

== Reception ==
Professional ratings
Review scores
Source	Rating
Allmusic	3.5/5 stars

Stephen Thomas Erlewine of AllMusic states that while the LP "isn't his best record of the '80s, it's possibly the best example of Haggard's far-reaching, varied tastes as he settled into his veteran status." In the 2013 book Merle Haggard: The Running Kind, biographer David Cantwell calls the title track "a scary record" that "screamed quiet and startled you alive."

== Track listing ==
1. "Kern River" (Merle Haggard) 3:20
2. "Old Flames Can't Hold a Candle to You" (Patricia Rose Sebert, Hugh Moffatt) 3:51
3. "There, I've Said It Again (Redd Evans, David Mann) 2:29
4. "You Don't Love Me Anymore" (Freddy Powers) 3:01
5. "Natural High" (Freddy Powers) 3:04
6. "Big Butter and Egg Man" (Louis Armstrong, Percy Venable) 2:24
7. "Ridin' High" (D. Reynolds, Powers) 2:39
8. "There's Somebody Else On Your Mind" (Haggard) 3:00
9. "I Wonder Where I'll Find You at Tonight" (Haggard) 2:06
10. "There Won't Be Another Now" (Red Lane) 3:19
11. "The Old Watermill" (B.H. Harris) 2:15

== Personnel ==
- Merle Haggard – vocals, guitar

The Strangers:

- Roy Nichols – guitar
- Norm Hamlet – steel guitar
- Tiny Moore – fiddle, mandolin
- Mark Yeary – keyboards
- Dennis Hromek – bass guitar
- Biff Adams – drums
- Jim Belkin – fiddle
- Don Markham – horns

with:

- Freddy Powers – rhythm guitar
- Grady Martin – electric guitar
- Bobby Wood – keyboards
- Bill Hullett – guitar
- Janie Fricke – background vocals

== Charts ==
=== Weekly charts ===
Chart (1985)	Peak position
US Top Country Albums (Billboard)	8

=== Year-end charts ===
Chart (1985)	Position
US Top Country Albums (Billboard)	29
