= Lloyd Lindroth =

American harpist

- Born: June 6, 1931
- Died: June 9, 1994 (aged 63); Nashville, Tennessee, United States
- Burial place: Las Vegas, Nevada, United States
- Other name: "The Liberace of the Harp"
- Occupation: harpist

Lloyd Lindroth (June 6, 1931 – June 9, 1994) was an American harpist who was nicknamed "The Liberace of the Harp". He had played for millions of people at the time of his death. A Seattle native, Lindroth began playing at age 14.

In 1983, he moved to Nashville, where lived until his death, three days after his 63rd birthday, following a bout with pneumonia. He played many shows in Las Vegas, where he was buried.

== Appearances ==
as musician:

- Roots (soundtrack)
- The Nashville Network
- Peter Gunn, episode: "Blind Item"

as actor:

- Easter Parade of Stars Auto Show (as himself)
