= Django and Jimmie =

Studio album by Willie Nelson and Merle Haggard
- Released: June 2, 2015
- Genres: Country, outlaw country
- Length: 46:44
- Label: Legacy Recordings
- Producer: Buddy Cannon

Willie Nelson chronology
December Day: Willie's Stash, Vol. 1 (2014)	Django and Jimmie (2015)	Summertime: Willie Nelson Sings Gershwin (2016)

Merle Haggard chronology
Working in Tennessee (2011)	Django and Jimmie (2015)	Timeless (2015)

Singles from Django and Jimmie
- 1. "It's All Going to Pot" Released: April 20, 2015; 2. "Unfair Weather Friend" Released: May 11, 2015; 3. "Alice in Hulaland" Released: June 24, 2015

Django and Jimmie is the sixth and final collaborative studio album by American country music artists Willie Nelson and Merle Haggard. It was released on June 2, 2015, by Legacy Recordings. The album was Haggard's final studio album prior to his death of pneumonia in April 2016, 10 months after its release.

The album was well received by the critics, while it topped Billboard's Top Country Albums and reached number seven on the Billboard 200 upon its release.

== Overview ==
Django and Jimmie marked Willie Nelson and Merle Haggard's sixth album collaboration. Nelson announced its completion during an appearance on Jimmy Kimmel Live! at South by Southwest festival on March 20, 2015. The first single, "It's All Going to Pot" was released on April 20 (420 day). The album was in development since at least early 2014.

Produced by Buddy Cannon, the album features fourteen tracks by Nelson and Haggard. The song "Django and Jimmie" is a tribute to musicians Django Reinhardt and Jimmie Rodgers. Cannon forwarded the title-track to Haggard and Nelson separately. Both were interested by the song, and had talked in previous years about recording a new collaboration album. The preproduction of the album took eighteen months. The parties involved discussed the type of material they wanted to include in the album and co-wrote some of the songs by talking on the telephone. The entire album was recorded in three days. It features a guest appearance by Bobby Bare on the tribute song "Missing Ol' Johnny Cash". The release of the album was announced for June 2, 2015.

== Reception ==
Professional ratings
Aggregate scores
Source	Rating
Metacritic	73/100
Review scores
Source	Rating
AllMusic	3.5/5 stars
American Songwriter	3.5/5 stars
Austin Chronicle	4/5 stars
The New Yorker	Favorable.
Paste	8.6/10
Rolling Stone	3/5 stars
Uncut	Favorable.
The Wall Street Journal	Favorable.

=== Critical ===
The album garnered positive reviews. With 73 points out of 100, the aggregate score website Metacritic classified them as "Generally favorable reviews". Rolling Stone rated the release with three stars out of five. The magazine called it a "grab bag" new and older material that relied on Nelson and Haggard's "mythology". Uncut delivered a favorable review, declaring: "Nelson sings like a canary and plays like a dream, Haggard growls like a grizzled jailbird and everyone seems to be having a blast". American Songwriter favored the chemistry between Nelson and Haggard, while it praised Cannon and his "rootsy, loose and homey" approach, while it called the backing band "great". Paste delivered a positive review, declaring: "Just hearing (Haggard and Nelson) make the music they want is plenty".

Austin Chronicle rated the album with four stars out of five. The review remarked the merger of the styles of both artists: Haggard's signature use of the Telecaster and steel guitar; with Nelson's guitar and Mickey Raphael's harmonica. It called the rasp on their voices "well seasoned", while it concluded that both "deliver a master class on how country music is supposed to be done". Los Angeles Times wrote a favorable review, that considered "the spirit in (Haggard and Nelson's) voices" the main feature of the album. The Wall Street Journal called it "one of the strongest, most engaging country albums of 2015" and remarked "its fresh, revealing songs, striking harmonies and varying rhythms". On its review, The New Yorker talked about the situation of Country music. The magazine opined that the album was "outlier in a genre that is increasingly fixated on youth", and discussed the disappearance of adult themes and aging in the genre.

AllMusic gave the album three-and-a-half stars out of five. It praised Cannon's "sharp ear for material, along with a way with a relaxed groove", while it considered Haggard and Nelson "filled with good humor (and) a delicate balance of fun and sweet".

=== Commercial ===
Upon its release, Django and Jimmie sold 31,000 units. It topped Billboard's Top Country Albums; and reached number seven on the Billboard 200, becoming Nelson's fourth top ten album on the chart and Haggard's first. The album has sold 148,000 copies in the US as of May 2016.

== Track listing ==
No.	Title	Writer(s)	Length
1.	"Django and Jimmie"	Jimmy Melton, Jeff Prince	2:53
2.	"It's All Going to Pot" (featuring Jamey Johnson)	Buddy Cannon, Jamey Johnson, Larry Shell	2:56
3.	"Unfair Weather Friend"	Marla Cannon-Goodman, Ward Davis	4:14
4.	"Missing Ol' Johnny Cash" (featuring Bobby Bare)	Merle Haggard	3:26
5.	"Live This Long"	Shawn Camp, Marv Green	3:35
6.	"Alice in Hulaland"	Cannon, Willie Nelson	3:01
7.	"Don't Think Twice, It's All Right"	Bob Dylan	4:10
8.	"Family Bible"	Nelson	3:36
9.	"It's Only Money"	Nelson, Cannon	3:56
10.	"Swinging Doors"	Haggard	2:51
11.	"Where Dreams Come to Die"	Nelson, Cannon	3:18
12.	"Somewhere Between"	Haggard	3:24
13.	"Driving the Herd"	Nelson, Cannon	2:49
14.	"The Only Man Wilder Than Me"	Haggard	2:35

== Personnel ==
- Bobby Bare - vocals on "Missing Ol' Johnny Cash"
- Eddie Bayers - drums
- Eli Beaird - bass guitar
- Larry Beaird - acoustic guitar
- Wyatt Beard - background vocals
- Jim "Moose" Brown - piano
- Shawn Camp - acoustic guitar
- Melonie Cannon - background vocals
- Renato Caranto - saxophone
- Tony Creasman - drums
- Dan Dugmore - steel guitar
- Kevin "Swine" Grantt - bass guitar, upright bass
- Ben Haggard - electric guitar
- Merle Haggard - lead vocals
- Tony Harrell - keyboards
- Jamey Johnson - vocals on "It's All Going to Pot"
- Mike Johnson - acoustic slide guitar, Dobro, steel guitar
- Alison Krauss - background vocals
- Liana Manis - background vocals
- Catherine Styron Marx - Hammond B-3 organ, piano
- Willie Nelson - Trigger, lead vocals
- Mickey Raphael - harmonica
- Bobby Terry - acoustic guitar, electric guitar
- Lonnie Wilson - drums

== Charts ==
=== Weekly charts ===
Chart (2015)	Peak position
Australian Albums (ARIA)	31
Austrian Albums (Ö3 Austria)	50
Belgian Albums (Ultratop Flanders)	172
Canadian Albums (Billboard)	16
Dutch Albums (Album Top 100)	50
Irish Albums (IRMA)	70
Swiss Albums (Schweizer Hitparade)	78
UK Albums (OCC)	66
US Billboard 200	7
US Top Country Albums (Billboard)	1

=== Year-end charts ===
Chart (2015)	Position
US Top Country Albums (Billboard)	35
Chart (2016)	Position
US Top Country Albums (Billboard)	60
