= Unforgettable (Merle Haggard album) =

Studio album by Merle Haggard
- Released: December 14, 2004
- Genre: Country, traditional pop
- Length: 39:29
- Label: Capitol
- Producer: Freddy Powers

Merle Haggard chronology
I Wish I Was Santa Claus (2004)	Unforgettable (2004)	Chicago Wind (2005)

Unforgettable is the fifty-seventh studio album by American country singer and songwriter Merle Haggard, released in 2004.

== Background ==
Unforgettable marked Haggard's return to Capitol Records, where he had enjoyed his biggest success for most of the 1960s and 1970s. This collection sees Haggard trying his hand at pre-rock and roll pop standards such as "Stardust" and "As Time Goes By." In addition to these classics, Haggard offers "What Can Love Do", which he composed with his wife Teresa, and covers the Freddy Powers song "Still Missing You". It peaked at number 39 on the Billboard country albums chart.

== Critical reception ==
Professional ratings
Review scores
Source	Rating
AllMusic	3/5 stars
Robert Christgau	

Stephen Thomas Erlewine of AllMusic deems the album as "warm, relaxed and laid-back, impeccably performed, and pleasurable to hear. Not that it contains any surprises—it's filled with low-key, piano-driven arrangements suited for a late-night smoky bar or any other of the many similarly styled standards records—but what makes Unforgettable work is Haggard's easy, assured delivery. He may not reinvent these songs, but he sings them as if they were his own, making this a small, romantic gem for listeners who love Hag the singer as much as they love Hag the writer."

== Track listing ==
1. "As Time Goes By" (Herman Hupfeld) – 3:09
2. "Gypsy" (Billy Reid) – 3:31
3. "Unforgettable" (Irving Gordon) – 3:04
4. "Stardust" (Hoagy Carmichael, Mitchell Parish) – 4:01
5. "I Can't Get Started" (Vernon Duke, Ira Gershwin) – 3:18
6. "Still Missing You" (Freddy Powers) – 2:46
7. "Pennies from Heaven" (Johnny Burke, Arthur Johnston) – 3:21
8. "Cry Me a River" (Arthur Hamilton) – 3:59
9. "I'll Get By (As Long as I Have You)" (Fred E. Ahlert, Roy Turk) – 3:06
10. "You're Nobody till Somebody Loves You" (Russ Morgan, Larry Stock, James Cavanaugh) – 2:37
11. "What Love Can Do" (Merle Haggard, Teresa Lane Haggard) – 3:31
12. "Goin' Away Party" (Cindy Walker) – 4:26

== Personnel ==
- Merle Haggard – vocals, guitar
- Biff Adam – drums
- Don Markham – saxophone, trumpet
- Gary Church – trombone
- Clint Strong – guitar
- Johnny Gimble – fiddle
- Freddy Powers – drums, guitar
- Eddie Curtis – bass
- B.B. Morse – bass
- Leland Sklar – bass
- Terry Domingue – drums
- Floyd Domino – piano
- Larrie Londin – drums
- Abe Manuel – accordion, fiddle, guitar
- Joe Manuel – guitar
- Randy Mason – drums, guitar
- Joe Reed – bass
- Oleg Schramm – piano
- Catherine Styron – piano
- Redd Volkaert – guitar
- Mike Wheeler – guitar
- Bobby Wood – piano
- Bruce McBeth – violin
- Rose Katai – violin
- Soo Kyong Kim – viola
- Kevin Price – cello
