= My Farewell to Elvis =

Studio album by Merle Haggard
- Released: October 1977
- Length: 25:10
- Label: MCA
- Producer: Fuzzy Owen

Merle Haggard chronology
A Working Man Can't Get Nowhere Today (1977)	My Farewell to Elvis (1977)	I'm Always on a Mountain When I Fall (1978)

Singles from My Farewell to Elvis
- 1. "From Graceland to the Promised Land" Released: September 1977

Alternative Cover

My Farewell to Elvis is the twenty-seventh studio album by American country music singer Merle Haggard, released in 1977 and his second release for MCA Records. It reached Number 6 on the Country album chart. The single "From Graceland to the Promised Land" reached number 4 on the Billboard Country Singles chart. The album is a tribute to the music of Elvis Presley, who died on August 16, 1977. He is backed by Roy Nichols, Ronnie Reno, and Mark Yeary of the Strangers.

== Background ==
Haggard, who had previously recorded tribute albums to Jimmie Rodgers and Bob Wills, had already started recording an LP of Elvis songs when Presley died at home at Graceland in Memphis in August 1977. Haggard quickly wrote "From Graceland to the Promised Land" and the album was out by October. Haggard had always made his admiration for "the King" known in interviews and, in his 1981 autobiography Sing Me Back Home, recalls meeting Presley at the International Hotel in Las Vegas through guitarist James Burton, who had played on albums by both singers. "I came away disappointed and, for a while, my Elvis image was tarnished," Haggard wrote."There was no big deal about the evening in general. I talked to Elvis only a little while. He seemed nervous and not too aware of his surroundings but nothing out of the ordinary happened. He introduced me to Priscilla, who didn't seem to know who I was. 'He's a country singer,' Elvis told her in a voice I thought sounded a little irritated... I guess that's why it bothers me so much to have fans put me up like some kind of idol. That's wrong. We're all human. None of us can walk on water, even Elvis."

The album features Presley's old backing vocal group the Jordanaires and drummer Buddy Harman. Ironically, James Burton did not take part in the project. Haggard chose to record only hits, including Presley's first record "That's All Right" and his Christmas classic "Blue Christmas." The album was a success, but it has a polarizing reputation among Haggard fans and critics.

== Critical reception ==
Professional ratings
Review scores
Source	Rating
AllMusic	3/5 stars
The Rolling Stone Album Guide	2/5 stars

Al Campbell of AllMusic praises the album, insisting, "My Farewell to Elvis may not be on par with Same Train, A Different Time or Tribute to the Best Damn Fiddle Player in the World, but it's a decent, if overlooked, session in the Haggard discography." In his 2013 book The Running Kind, on the other hand, Haggard biographer David Cantwell dismisses the album as " a missed opportunity" and "a disappointing effort to say the least, not because it was particularly bad, but just because its arrangements were so generic in a faux-Fifties sort of way..."

== Track listing ==
1. "From Graceland to the Promised Land" (Merle Haggard) – 2:28
2. "In the Ghetto" (Mac Davis) – 2:55
3. "Don't Be Cruel" (Otis Blackwell, Elvis Presley) – 1:59
4. "Jailhouse Rock" (Jerry Leiber, Mike Stoller) – 2:50
5. "Love Me Tender" (Vera Matson, Presley) – 2:42
6. "That's All Right" (Arthur Crudup) – 2:29
7. "Heartbreak Hotel" (Mae Boren Axton, Tommy Durden, Presley) – 2:18
8. "Blue Christmas" (Billy Hayes, Jay W. Johnson) – 2:23
9. "Blue Suede Shoes" (Carl Perkins) – 2:01
10. "Are You Lonesome Tonight?" (Roy Turk, Lou Handman) – 2:48
11. "Merle's Farewell to Elvis" (Haggard) – :17

== Personnel ==
- Merle Haggard – vocals, guitar
- Roy Nichols – guitar
- Ronnie Reno – guitar
- Dave Kirby – guitar
- Red Lane – guitar
- Mark Yeary – piano
- Johnny Gimble – fiddle
- Buddy Emmons – steel guitar, dobro
- Bunky Keels – piano
- Bob Moore – bass
- Buddy Harman – drums
- Sheldon Kurland Strings – strings
- The Jordanaires – backing vocals

== Chart positions ==
Year	Chart	Position
1977	Billboard Country albums	6
1977	Billboard 200	133
