= Chill Factor (song) =

Single by Merle Haggard

from the album Chill Factor
- B-side: "Thanking the Good Lord"
- Released: March 19, 1988
- Genre: Country
- Length: 3:20
- Label: Epic
- Songwriter(s): Merle Haggard
- Producer(s): Ken Seusov, Merle Haggard

Merle Haggard singles chronology
"Twinkle, Twinkle Lucky Star" (1987)	"Chill Factor" (1988)	"We Never Touch at All" (1988)

"Chill Factor" is a song written and recorded by American country music artist Merle Haggard backed by The Strangers. It was released in March 1988 as the second single and title track from the album Chill Factor. The song reached number 9 on the Billboard Hot Country Singles & Tracks chart.

== Critical reception ==
Spin called the song, "a bleak, stark account of love gone cold. While acknowledging his encroaching age, he's also taking stock of what the years have taught him."

== Chart performance ==
Chart (1988)	Peak position
US Hot Country Songs (Billboard)	9
Canadian RPM Country Tracks	12
