= I'm Always on a Mountain When I Fall (song) =

Single by Merle Haggard

from the album I'm Always on a Mountain When I Fall
- B-side: "Life of a Rodeo Cowboy"
- Released: April 12, 1978
- Recorded: February 1978
- Genre: Country
- Length: 2:48
- Label: MCA
- Songwriter(s): Chuck Howard
- Producer(s): Fuzzy Owen, Hank Cochran

Merle Haggard singles chronology
"Running Kind" (1978)	"I'm Always on a Mountain When I Fall" (1978)	"It's Been a Great Afternoon" (1978)

"I'm Always on a Mountain When I Fall" is a song written by Chuck Howard, and recorded by American country music artist Merle Haggard. It was released in April 1978 as the first single and title track from the album I'm Always on a Mountain When I Fall. The song reached number 2 on the Billboard Hot Country Singles & Tracks chart.

== Chart performance ==
Chart (1978)	Peak position
US Hot Country Songs (Billboard)	2
Canadian RPM Country Tracks	2
