= A Friend in California (song) =

Single by Merle Haggard

from the album A Friend in California
- B-side: "Mama's Prayers"
- Released: May 31, 1986
- Genre: Country
- Length: 3:20
- Label: Epic
- Songwriter(s): Freddy Powers
- Producer(s): Merle Haggard, Ron "Snake" Reynolds

Merle Haggard singles chronology
"I Had a Beautiful Time" (1986)	"A Friend in California" (1986)	"Out Among the Stars" (1986)

"A Friend in California" is a song written by Freddy Powers, and recorded by American country music artist Merle Haggard backed by The Strangers. It was released in May 1986 as the second single and title track from the album A Friend in California. The song reached number 9 on the Billboard Hot Country Singles & Tracks chart.

== Personnel ==
- Merle Haggard– vocals, guitar, fiddle

The Strangers:

- Roy Nichols – guitar
- Norman Hamlet – steel guitar, dobro
- Clint Strong – guitar
- Mark Yeary – keyboards
- Dennis Hromek – bass
- Biff Adam – drums
- Jimmy Belken – fiddle
- Don Markham – trumpet, saxophone
- Gary Church – trombone, trumpet
- Donna Faye Harman - Background Vocals

== Chart performance ==
Chart (1986)	Peak position
US Hot Country Songs (Billboard)	9
Canadian RPM Country Tracks	12
