= Amber Waves of Grain =

Live album by Merle Haggard
- Released: 1985
- Recorded: Hollywood Star Theater
- Genre: Country
- Length: 27:44
- Label: Epic
- Producer: Merle Haggard, Bob Montgomery

Merle Haggard chronology
Kern River (1985)	Amber Waves of Grain (1985)	A Friend in California (1986)

Singles from Amber Waves of Grain
- 1. "Amber Waves of Grain" Released: October 1985; 2. "American Waltz" Released: December 1985

Professional ratings
Review scores
Source	Rating
Allmusic	2/5 stars

Amber Waves of Grain is a live album by American country music artist Merle Haggard with backing by The Strangers, released in 1985. It was Haggard's third live album in four years and was recorded at the Hollywood Star Theatre. It features a mix of Haggard's big hits and other, more obscure tracks. The title cut, written by Freddy Powers, is a tribute to the American farmer, in keeping with the spirit of the Willie Nelson-spearheaded Farm Aid benefit, as does "Tulare Dust" and "The Farmer's Daughter." The LP peaked at number 25 on the Billboard country albums chart.

== Title ==
The title comes from the line "For amber waves of grain," from the song "America the Beautiful".

== Track listing ==
1. "Amber Waves of Grain" (Freddy Powers) – 3:49
2. "Tulare Dust/Mama Tried" (Merle Haggard) – 3:00
3. "The Farmer's Daughter" (Haggard) – 2:51
4. "The Okie from Muskogee's Comin' Home"(Haggard, Powers)/"Okie from Muskogee" (Haggard, Eddie Burris) – 3:44
5. "Gone with the Wind" (Dennis Barney) – 2:02
6. "I Wish Things Were Simple Again" (Haggard, Tommy Collins, Russell Pate) – 2:30
7. "Workin' Man Blues" (Haggard)/"Always Late with Your Kisses" (Lefty Frizzell, Blackie Crawford) – 3:10
8. "American Waltz" (John Greenebaum, Troy Seals, Eddie Setser) – 3:09

== Personnel ==
- Merle Haggard – vocals, guitar, fiddle

The Strangers:

- Roy Nichols – guitar
- Norm Hamlet – steel guitar
- Clint Strong – guitar
- Mark Yeary – keyboards
- Dennis Hromek – bass
- Biff Adams – drums
- Jim Belkin – fiddle
- Don Markham – horns
- Gary Church – horns

and:

- Reggie Young – guitar
- Don Potter – guitar
- Hoot Howler – fiddle
- Janie Fricke – backing vocals
- Tammy Wynette – backing vocals
- Donna Faye – backing vocals
- Curtis Young – backing vocals
