= What Am I Gonna Do (With the Rest of My Life) =

Single by Merle Haggard

from the album That's the Way Love Goes
- B-side: "I Think I'll Stay"
- Released: July 16, 1983
- Genre: Country
- Length: 3:31
- Label: Epic
- Songwriter(s): Merle Haggard
- Producer(s): Merle Haggard, Ray Baker

Merle Haggard singles chronology
"Pancho and Lefty" (1983)	"What Am I Gonna Do (With the Rest of My Life)" (1983)	"That's the Way Love Goes" (1983)

"What Am I Gonna Do (With the Rest of My Life)" is a song written and recorded by American country music artist Merle Haggard backed by The Strangers. It was released in July 1983 as the first single from the album That's the Way Love Goes. The song reached number 3 on the Billboard Hot Country Singles & Tracks chart. In 2019, Montgomery Gentry released the song off the album Outskirts.

== Chart performance ==
Chart (1983)	Peak position
US Hot Country Songs (Billboard)	3
Canadian RPM Country Tracks	2
