= Out Among the Stars (Merle Haggard album) =

Studio album by Merle Haggard
- Released: 1986
- Recorded: Eleven Eleven Studio, Nashville
- Genre: Country
- Length: 37:51
- Label: Epic
- Producer: Merle Haggard, Billy Sherrill, Bob Montgomery, Fuzzy Owen, Ray Baker

Merle Haggard chronology
A Friend In California (1986)	Out Among the Stars (1986)	Seashores of Old Mexico (1987)

Singles from Out Among the Stars
- 1. "Out Among the Stars" Released: September 1986; 2. "Almost Persuaded" Released: April 1987

Out Among the Stars is the forty-second studio album by American recording artist Merle Haggard released on Epic Records in 1986. It reached number 15 on the Billboard country albums chart. It contains the song "My Life's Been Grand," which Merle wrote with Gordon Terry of The Strangers.

== Critical reception ==
Professional ratings
Review scores
Source	Rating
Allmusic	2.5/5 stars

Eugene Chadbourne of AllMusic derides the album, writing that what Haggard does emotionally with his lyrics "is so ripe with sentimentality that with the wrong kind of production it can quickly evolve into just plain rotten," and calls the album's title track "just overblown, a potboiler on the level of the worst Bruce Springsteen material." In his book The Running Kind, biographer David Cantwell classifies the LP as one of Haggard's "never great, but always solid" eighties albums.

== Track listing ==
No.	Title	Writer(s)	Length
1.	"Out Among the Stars"	Adam Mitchell	4:27
2.	"My Life's Been Grand"	Merle Haggard, Gordon Terry	2:30
3.	"Love Keeps Hanging On"	Haggard	2:32
4.	"Why Can't I Cry"	Haggard	5:00
5.	"Love Don't Hurt Every Time"	Haggard	2:29
6.	"Pennies from Heaven"	Johnny Burke, Arthur Johnston	4:15
7.	"Tell Me Something Bad About Tulsa"	Red Lane	3:15
8.	"The Show's Almost Over"	Chuck Howard	3:56
9.	"Bleachers"	Haggard	3:21
10.	"Susie"	Haggard	2:24
11.	"Almost Persuaded"	Billy Sherrill, Glenn Sutton	3:12
