= A Working Man Can't Get Nowhere Today =

Studio album by Merle Haggard and the Strangers
- Released: September 1977
- Genre: Country, country blues
- Label: Capitol
- Producer: Ken Nelson, Fuzzy Owen

Merle Haggard and the Strangers chronology
Ramblin' Fever (1977)	A Working Man Can't Get Nowhere Today (1977)	My Farewell to Elvis (1977)

Singles from A Working Man Can't Get Nowhere Today
- 1. "A Working Man Can't Get Nowhere Today" Released: 1977; 2. "Running Kind" Released: 1978

A Working Man Can't Get Nowhere Today is a studio album by American country music singer Merle Haggard and the Strangers, released in 1977. Even though Haggard had moved to the MCA label, Capitol created this release from tracks previously recorded in 1975 and 1976.

== Recording and composition ==
The album was the result of some shrewd marketing on Capitol's part, playing off Haggard's previous #1 hit "Workin' Man Blues" and his reputation as the "Poet of the Common Man" by dressing him up on the cover as a hardhat worker sitting at a bus stop with a lunch box and dangling cigarette. The concept was timely, considering the Carter-era oil crisis that was engulfing the country, and is reflected in the self-penned title track. Despite a short running time of twenty-four minutes, the assembled LP includes several high quality cuts that, remarkably, did not make their original albums. Foremost of these is "Running Kind," a song that Haggard had recorded in Nashville in 1975 and would become a concert favorite. In his 1999 memoir My House of Memories, Haggard titled one of the chapters after the song and stated, "I later wrote 'The Runnin' Kind,' a song that, in essence, says I've always been running, for no particular reason. There is a restlessness in my soul that I've never conquered..." Another outtake is "Goodbye Lefty," his touching tribute to his hero Lefty Frizzell, who died in 1975. "Blues for Dixie" and especially the cover of Hank Williams' "Moanin' the Blues" feature a breezy, feel-good energy that was largely absent on his final Capitol releases. Perhaps the most curious track on the album is its closer "I'm a White Boy." In his 2013 book on Haggard The Running Kind, biographer David Cantwell describes it as "an aggrieved-feeling white reply to James Brown's 'Say It Loud - I'm Black and I'm Proud,' with Haggard shouting "I'm proud! And white! And I got a song to sing!"

== Critical reception ==
Professional ratings
Review scores
Source	Rating
AllMusic	4/5 stars
Christgau's Record Guide	A−
The Rolling Stone Album Guide	4/5 stars

AllMusic critic Eugene Chadbourne stated in his review: "This is one of this country legend's well thought-out combinations of hardcore traditional material from Hank Williams and the Delmore Brothers, combined with his own brilliant songwriting from some of his tried and true perspectives..." Music critic Robert Christgau also rated the album highly, writing "These are powerful pieces whether you like them or not, rendered with passionate sympathy and a touch of distance—his strongest in years." The Rolling Stone Album Guide called the album "as tough a set of country blues as was released in the '70s."

== Track listing ==
No.	Title	Writer(s)	Length
1.	"A Working Man Can't Get Nowhere Today"	Merle Haggard	2:55
2.	"Making Believe"	Jimmy Work	3:02
3.	"Blues Stay Away from Me"	Alton Delmore, Rabon Delmore, Henry Glover, Wayne Raney	2:16
4.	"Got a Letter from My Kid"	Alex Kramer, Joan Whitney, Hy Zaret	2:29
5.	"When My Last Song Is Sung"	Haggard	1:58
6.	"Moanin' the Blues"	Hank Williams	2:03
7.	"Goodbye Lefty"	Haggard	2:39
8.	"Blues for Dixie"	O. W. Mayo	2:40
9.	"Running Kind"	Haggard	3:00
10.	"I'm a White Boy"	Haggard	2:05

== Personnel ==
- Merle Haggard – vocals, guitar

The Strangers:

- Roy Nichols – lead guitar
- Norman Hamlet – steel guitar, dobro
- Tiny Moore – mandolin
- Ronnie Reno – guitar
- Mark Yeary – piano
- James Tittle – bass
- Biff Adam – drums
- Don Markham – saxophone

with

- Tommy Collins– guitar
- David Kirby – guitar
- Dennis Hromek – bass
- Johnny Gimble – fiddle

and

- Al Bruno – guitar
- Hargus "Pig" Robbins – piano, organ
- Glen D. Hardin – piano
- Bob Moore – bass

== Chart positions ==
Year	Chart	Position
1977	Billboard Country albums	28
