= A Friend in California (album) =

Studio album by Merle Haggard
- Released: 1986
- Studio: 1111 Sound Studios, Nashville, Tennessee
- Genre: Country
- Length: 28:44
- Label: Epic
- Producer: Merle Haggard, Ron Reynolds

Merle Haggard chronology
Amber Waves of Grain (1985)	A Friend in California (1986)	Out Among the Stars (1986)

Singles from A Friend in California
- 1. "I Had a Beautiful Time" Released: January 25, 1986; 2. "A Friend in California" Released: May 31, 1986

A Friend in California is the forty-first studio album by American recording artist Merle Haggard with backing by The Strangers, released in 1986.

== Critical reception ==
Professional ratings
Review scores
Source	Rating
AllMusic	2/5 stars
Robert Christgau	B+

Music critic Robert Christgau wrote "Just when I decide he's gonna lay back forever he ambles into this. No Nippophobia, minimal love pap, a touch of Mexico, and lots of swing—except for one Freddy Powers pledge it keeps going till the obligatory sentimentality of the last two cuts."

== Track listing ==
No.	Title	Writer(s)	Length
1.	"A Friend in California"	Freddy Powers	3:18
2.	"This Time I Really Do"	F. Powers	3:00
3.	"This Cold War with You"	Floyd Tillman	1:52
4.	"I Had a Beautiful Time"	Haggard	3:01
5.	"Texas"	Haggard, F. Powers	3:01
6.	"The Okie from Muskogee's Comin' Home"	Haggard, F. Powers	2:23
7.	"Mama's Prayer"	Haggard	2:50
8.	"Silverthorn Mountain"	Haggard	2:01
9.	"The Song Is for You"	F. Powers, Mary Lou Powers	3:32
10.	"Thank You for Keeping Our House"	Haggard, Debbie Parret	3:18

== Personnel ==
- Merle Haggard – vocals, guitar, fiddle

The Strangers:

- Roy Nichols – guitar
- Norman Hamlet – steel guitar, dobro
- Clint Strong – guitar
- Mark Yeary – keyboards
- Dennis Hromek – bass
- Biff Adam – drums
- Jimmy Belken – fiddle
- Don Markham – trumpet, saxophone
- Gary Church – trombone, trumpet

with:

- Freddy Powers – backing vocals

and:

- Donna Faye – backing vocals

== Charts ==
=== Weekly charts ===
Chart (1986)	Peak position
US Top Country Albums (Billboard)	2

=== Year-end charts ===
Chart (1986)	Position
US Top Country Albums (Billboard)	24
