= Someday When Things Are Good =

Single by Merle Haggard

from the album That's the Way Love Goes
- B-side: "If You Hated Me"
- Released: March 24, 1984
- Genre: Country
- Length: 3:36
- Label: Epic
- Songwriter(s): Merle Haggard; Leona Williams
- Producer(s): Merle Haggard, Ray Baker

Merle Haggard singles chronology
"That's the Way Love Goes" (1983)	"Someday When Things Are Good" (1984)	"Let's Chase Each Other Around the Room" (1984)

"Someday When Things Are Good' is a song co-written and recorded by American country music artist Merle Haggard. It was released in March 1984 as the third single from his album That's the Way Love Goes. The song was Haggard's thirty-first number-one country single as a solo artist. The single went to number one for one week and spent a total of thirteen weeks on the country chart.

Haggard wrote the song with his then-wife Leona Williams; it became the title track of her own 1984 album Someday When Things Are Good.

== Personnel ==
- Merle Haggard– vocals, guitar, fiddle

The Strangers:

- Roy Nichols – guitar
- Norm Hamlet – steel guitar
- Tiny Moore – fiddle, mandolin
- Mark Yeary – keyboards
- Dennis Hromek – bass
- Biff Adams – drums
- Jimmy Belken – fiddle
- Don Markham – horns

== Charts ==
=== Weekly charts ===
Chart (1984)	Peak position
US Hot Country Songs (Billboard)	1
Canadian RPM Country Tracks	1

=== Year-end charts ===
Chart (1984)	Position
US Hot Country Songs (Billboard)	22
