= That's the Way Love Goes (Merle Haggard album) =

Studio album by Merle Haggard
- Released: August 1983
- Recorded: January/March 1983
- Studio: Woodland (Nashville, Tennessee); Eleven Eleven (Nashville, Tennessee)
- Genre: Country
- Length: 32:00
- Label: Epic
- Producer: Merle Haggard, Ray Baker

Merle Haggard chronology
Heart to Heart (1983)	That's the Way Love Goes (1983)	The Epic Collection (Recorded Live) (1983)

Singles from That's the Way Love Goes
- 1. "What Am I Gonna Do (With the Rest of My Life)" Released: July 16, 1983; 2. "That's the Way Love Goes" Released: November 19, 1983; 3. "Someday When Things Are Good" Released: March 24, 1984

That's the Way Love Goes is the thirty-eighth studio album by the American country music singer Merle Haggard backed by The Strangers, released in 1983.

== Background ==
Haggard had loved Lefty Frizzell's "That's the Way Love Goes" since he first heard the song and tried recording it towards the end of his time with Capitol Records in the mid-1970s with unsatisfactory results. That version, which can be found on the box set Hag: The Studio Recordings 1969-1976, is more lighthearted and whimsical than the one Haggard recorded in 1983. The song topped the Billboard country singles chart, as did "Someday When Things Are Good," a song co-written by Haggard and his wife Leona Williams. It also proved to be prophetic, as the couple divorced that year. Williams had also written Haggard's recent hit "You Take Me For Granted", but Williams, who replaced Haggard's previous wife Bonnie Owens in the Strangers, had creative aspirations of her own that her husband did not always appreciate. As Haggard wrote in his 1981 autobiography Sing Me Back Home, "I'd reached the point in my career where I felt in charge of my music...When Leona tried to make a suggestion, I resented it. She resented my resentment. So it went. She kept saying she felt like an outsider...I couldn't understand why she got so upset by the press leaning toward good ol' Bonnie and the snide remarks about Leona coming in and breaking up my 'happy home.'" The divorce instigated a personal landslide for Haggard, who spent the rest of the decade losing himself in alcohol and drugs, although initially it did not prevent him from having #1 hits. As he recalled in his 1999 autobiography House of Memories, "I roared right through the 1980s, running and drugging the nights away, making bad decisions while under the influence of various substances." That's The Way Love Goes was his third hit LP for Epic in two years, not counting two separate duet albums with George Jones and Willie Nelson. While discussing his own song "Bad Boy" in the liner notes to Great Days: The John Prine Anthology, John Prine admitted, "Around that time, I fell under the spell of Merle Haggard's songwriting. There was a period when he seemed to be churning out some really great stuff. He was bringing out great albums every six or eight months, and I considered 'Bad Boy' sort of in the vein of what he was doing."

Overall, That's The Way Love Goes offers a more laid back feel than Haggard's later LPs, demonstrating his emotive vocal range on several ballads like "What Am I Gonna Do (With the Rest of My Life)", which peaked at number 3 and appears to reflect the turmoil with Williams, as does the lilting yet bitter "If You Hated Me". Other tracks have the bright pop sound that was becoming more predominate on country albums in the 1980s, such as "I'm Carrying Fire" and the jazzy "The Last Boat of the Day". The album's closing track, "I Think I'll Stay", sounds like an after hours blues jam as Haggard croons, "Think I'll stay around till I'm sick of home sweet home..." The album peaked at number 8 on the Billboard country albums chart.

== Critical reception ==
Professional ratings
Review scores
Source	Rating
Allmusic	3/5 stars

Matt Fink of AllMusic rated the album "another decent collection of laidback ballads that lets Haggard display some of the full range of his vocal talents". John Morthland of Amazon.com, wrote, "Here's one of the great, lost Haggard albums... The tone is bleak, funereal, without a single uptempo stomp to break up the succession of one beautiful, heartbreaking ballad after another." At the Grammy Awards of 1985, That's the Way Love Goes won the Grammy Award for Best Male Country Vocal Performance.

That's the Way Love Goes was reissued on CD by DCC Compact Classics in 2000, and reissued again with Going Where the Lonely Go on CD by S & P Records in 2005.

== Track listing ==
No.	Title	Writer(s)	Length
1.	"What Am I Gonna Do (With the Rest of My Life)"	Merle Haggard	3:35
2.	"(I'm Gonna Paint Me) A Bed of Roses"	Haggard, Bobby Whitson	2:11
3.	"Someday When Things Are Good"	Haggard, Leona Williams	3:38
4.	"That's the Way Love Goes"	Lefty Frizzell, Sanger D. Shafer	3:04
5.	"Carryin' Fire"	Red Lane, Jim Ray, Sam Beck	2:55
6.	"Don't Seem Like We've Been Together All Our Lives"	Haggard	2:56
7.	"If You Hated Me"	Haggard, Lane, Dean Holloway	2:42
8.	"Love Will Find You"	Haggard	2:36
9.	"The Last Boat of the Day"	Hank Cochran, Lane	3:40
10.	"I Think I'll Stay"	Haggard	4:43

== Personnel ==
- Merle Haggard – vocals, guitar

The Strangers:

- Roy Nichols – guitar
- Norm Hamlet – steel guitar
- Tiny Moore – fiddle, mandolin
- Mark Yeary – keyboards
- Dennis Hromek – bass guitar
- Biff Adams – drums
- Jimmy Belken – fiddle
- Don Markham – horns

with:

- Dave Kirby – guitar
- Red Lane – guitar

and:

- Reggie Young – guitar
- Greg Galbraith – guitar
- Glenn Martin – guitar
- Bobby Wood – keyboards
- Mike Leach – bass guitar
- Gene Chrisman – drums
- Kenny Malone – drums
- Terry McMillan – harmonica

== Charts ==
=== Weekly charts ===
Chart (1983–1984)	Peak position
US Top Country Albums (Billboard)	8

=== Year-end charts ===
Chart (1984)	Position
US Top Country Albums (Billboard)	19
