= That's the Way Love Goes (Johnny Rodriguez song) =

1973 single by Johnny Rodriguez

Single by Johnny Rodriguez

from the album All I Ever Meant to Do Was Sing
- B-side: "I Really Don't Want to Know"
- Released: December 1973
- Genre: Country
- Length: 1:51
- Label: Mercury
- Songwriters: Lefty Frizzell; Sanger D. Shafer
- Producer: Jerry Kennedy

Johnny Rodriguez singles chronology
"Ridin' My Thumb to Mexico" (1973)	"That's the Way Love Goes" (1973)	"Something" (1974)

"That's the Way Love Goes"

Single by Merle Haggard

from the album That's the Way Love Goes
- B-side: "Don't Seem Like We've Been Together All Our Lives"
- Released: November 19, 1983
- Genre: Country
- Length: 3:04
- Label: Epic
- Songwriters: Lefty Frizzell; Sanger D. Shafer
- Producers: Merle Haggard; Ray Baker

Merle Haggard singles chronology
"What Am I Gonna Do (With the Rest of My Life)" (1983)	"That's the Way Love Goes" (1983)	"Someday When Things Are Good" (1984)

"That's the Way Love Goes" is a song written by Lefty Frizzell and Sanger D. Shafer. It was recorded by Frizzell and included on his album The Legendary, released on September 18, 1973. The following year it was released as the B-side of his single "I Never Go Around Mirrors" and was later included in compilation albums. It was also released in December 1973 by American country music artist Johnny Rodriguez as the second single from the album All I Ever Meant to Do Was Sing. The song was Rodriguez's fourth hit on the U.S. country chart and third number one in a row. The single stayed at number one for one week and spent a total of 14 weeks on the chart.

== Cover versions ==
Connie Smith recorded the song and made it the title track of her 1974 album That's the Way Love Goes.

Merle Haggard released the song in November 1983 as the second and title track from his album That's the Way Love Goes. Haggard's version was his 30th number one single. His version spent 21 weeks on the charts and won him that year's Grammy Award for Best Country Vocal Performance - Male. He charted a second rendition of the song in 1999 as a duet with Jewel, taking this version to #56 on the country charts.

In 1977, Willie Nelson covered the song on his album To Lefty from Willie. In 2014, Randy Travis covered the song on his album Influence Vol. 2: The Man I Am. In 2019, Crystal Gayle covered the song on her album You Don't Know Me: Classic Country. Ronnie Dunn then recorded his own cover for his 2020 release Re-Dunn, and Alan Jackson covered the song on his 2021 album, Where Have You Gone.

== Chart performance ==
=== Johnny Rodriguez ===
Chart (1973–1974)	Peak position
US Hot Country Songs (Billboard)	1
Canadian RPM Country Tracks	2

=== Merle Haggard ===
Chart (1983–1984)	Peak position
US Hot Country Songs (Billboard)	1
Canadian RPM Country Tracks	1

=== Merle Haggard and Jewel ===
Chart (1999)	Peak position
US Hot Country Songs (Billboard)	56
Canadian RPM Country Tracks	71
