= Chill Factor (album) =

Studio album by Merle Haggard
- Released: November 1987
- Genre: Country
- Length: 35:42
- Label: Epic
- Producer: Merle Haggard, Ken Suesov

Merle Haggard chronology
Seashores of Old Mexico (1987)	Chill Factor (1987)	5:01 Blues (1989)

Singles from Chill Factor
- 1. "Twinkle, Twinkle Lucky Star" Released: November 21, 1987; 2. "Chill Factor" Released: March 19, 1988; 3. "We Never Touch at All" Released: July 9, 1988; 4. "You Babe" Released: November 19, 1988

Chill Factor is the forty-fourth studio album by American country music singer Merle Haggard, with backing by the Strangers, released on the Epic label in 1987.

== Background ==
Chill Factor was released in the midst of the "new traditionalist" movement in country music, which saw new, younger country stars such as Randy Travis begin to dominate the charts. While several country music veterans saw their presence on country radio diminish, Haggard was one of the few from the old guard who remained relevant, with Chill Factor reaching number 8 on the Billboard country album chart. However, it would be Haggard's last Top 10 album until 2007. Haggard, who had experienced drug and alcohol problems in the eighties, would be further distracted by financial difficulties in the ensuing years. In addition, long time Stranger guitarist Roy Nichols, who Haggard had played with since the early sixties, informed him that he would be retiring from the road due to ill health. In his 1999 memoir House of Memories, Haggard said of Nichols, "He is unquestionably one of the greatest guitar players in the world and definitely the greatest I've ever known closely. Until the late eighties, every successful country singer had a signature instrumental sound. Roy created mine."

After the relatively disappointing chart performance of his previous album Out Among the Stars, Chill Factor was a commercial comeback for Haggard, who wrote or co-wrote all the songs on the album except one. In addition to the chart-topping "Twinkle, Twinkle Lucky Star", the title track was also a top ten hit, peaking at number 9, but two other singles, "We Never Touch at All" and "You Babe," failed to crack the top 20.

== Critical reception ==
Professional ratings
Review scores
Source	Rating
AllMusic	4/5 stars
Robert Christgau	B−

Stephen Thomas Erlewine of AllMusic wrote "...while this sound dates the album somewhat, it’s also easy to hear beyond it, to recognize that this is one of Haggard’s strongest collection of songs of the '80s, a record where he remains a peerless craftsman and has yet to succumb completely to the streak of bitter nostalgia that sometimes tainted his records of the '90s."

Spin said, "This is more than just another good Merle Haggard record. His gone-to-hell-and-back voice is sounding better the growlier it gets. The simple, understated production surrounds Haggard with more than a touch of blues."

== Track listing ==
All songs written by Merle Haggard unless otherwise indicated.

1. "Chill Factor" – 3:20
2. "Twinkle, Twinkle Lucky Star" – 3:22
3. "Man From Another Time" (Haggard, Freddy Powers) – 2:42
4. "We Never Touch at All" (Haggard, Hank Cochran) – 3:41
5. "You Babe" (Sanger D. Shafer) – 3:50
6. "Thanking The Good Lord" – 2:31
7. "After Dark" – 3:45
8. "1929" – 3:38
9. "Thirty Again" – 3:09
10. "I Don't Have Any Love Around" – 3:19
11. "More Than This Old Heart Can Take" (Haggard, Powers) – 2:25

== Personnel ==
- Merle Haggard – lead vocals, background vocals, rhythm guitar, lead guitar

The Strangers:

- Norm Hamlet – dobro, pedal steel guitar
- Bobby Wayne – rhythm guitar
- Clint Strong – rhythm guitar, lead guitar
- Mark Yeary – keyboards
- Biff Adam – drums
- Jim Belken – fiddle
- Don Markham – saxophone, trumpet
- Gary Church – trombone

with:

- Grady Martin – lead guitar
- Red Lane – guitar
- Bonnie Owens – background vocals

and:

- Steve Gibson – rhythm guitar, lead guitar
- Mike Leech – bass guitar
- Joe Chemay – background vocals
- Jim Haas – background vocals
- Jon Joice – background vocals
