= Bobby Bare singles discography =

Singles discography of American artist Bobby Bare

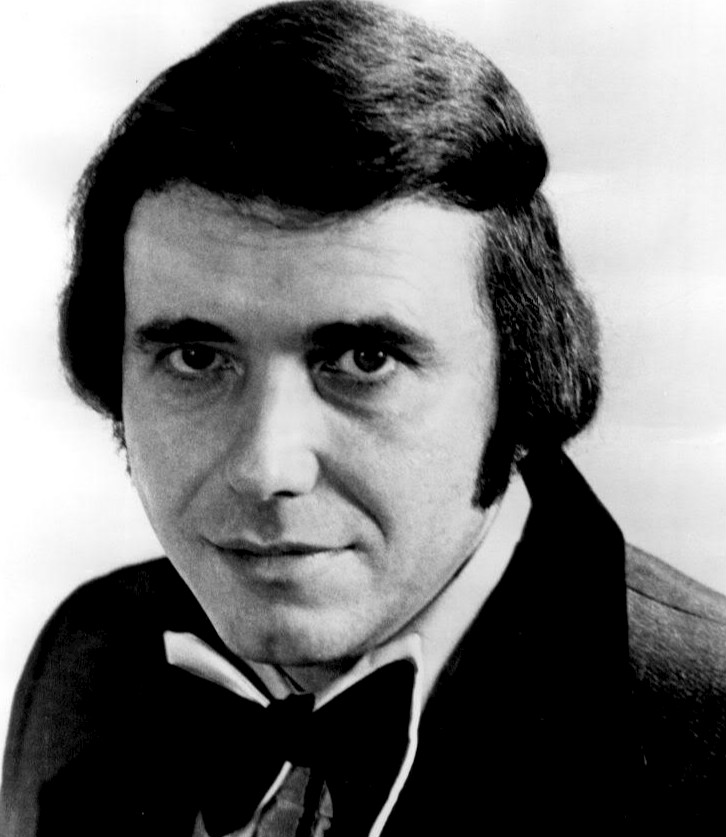
- Bare in 1973
- Singles: 96
- Music videos: 3
- Lead singles: 80
- Collaborative singles: 8
- Featured singles: 3
- German singles: 5

The singles discography of American country artist Bobby Bare contains 96 singles. Of these, 80 are singles released as a lead artist, eight as a collaborative artist, three as a featured artist and five were released solely to Germany. Bare's first single to chart was 1958's "The All-American Boy", which reached number two on the American Billboard Hot 100 and number nine on the Australian Kent pop chart. Bare's singles would not receive more commercial success until he signed with RCA Victor. In 1962, his single "Shame on Me" charted on both the Billboard Hot 100 and the Hot Country Songs charts. The following year, Bare's pair of singles reached major chart positions on the Billboard Hot 100 and Country Songs charts: "Detroit City" and "500 Miles Away from Home". Both singles were his first to chart in the top ten of the country chart. RCA followed it in 1964 with the top ten singles "Miller's Cave" and "Four Strong Winds".

In 1965, he collaborated alongside Skeeter Davis and their single, "A Dear John Letter", reached number 11 on the country chart. He also collaborated as a trio with Liz Anderson and Norma Jean on the top five 1966 single, "The Game of Triangles". As a solo artist, Bare had top ten hits during this time with "It's All Right" (1965) and "Streets of Baltimore" (1966). In the late sixties, Bare's reached the American country songs top 20 with regularity. The top 20 single, "Find Out What's Happening", was Bare's first to reach Canada's RPM Country chart, climbing to number five. In 1969, "(Margie's At) The Lincoln Park Inn" reached the top ten of the American and Canadian country charts. In 1970, Bare's first three singles for Mercury Records made the Billboard country top ten: "That's How I Got to Memphis", "Come Sundown" and "Please Don't Tell Me How the Story Ends".

In 1973, Bare returned to RCA Victor. He collaborated with his son, Bobby Bare Jr. on the number two Billboard country single "Daddy, What If". The song was also his first since 1964 to chart on the Billboard Hot 100, peaking at number 41. It was followed by the single, "Marie Laveau", which became his only song to top both the Billboard and RPM country charts. During the remainder of the seventies and into the eighties, Bare reached the country songs top 20 charts with frequency. Among his top 20 singles of this period included "Alimony" (1975), "The Winner" (1976), "Drop Kick Me Jesus" (1976), "Sleep Tight Good Night Man" (1978), "Numbers" (1979), "Willie Jones" (1980) and "New Cut Road" (1982). During this period, he was featured on Rosanne Cash's 1979 top 20 single, "No Memories Hangin' Round". Bare's last charting single to date is 1985's "Reno and Me".

== Singles ==
=== As lead artist ===
List of singles, with selected chart positions, and other relevant details
Title	Year	Peak chart positions						Album
Title	Year	US	US Cou.	US AC	AUS	CAN	CAN Cou.	Album
"Another Love Has Ended"	1956	—	—	—	—	—	—	—N/a
"Darling Don't"	1957	—	—	—	—	—	—	—N/a
"The Livin' End"	1957	—	—	—	—	—	—	—N/a
"Vampira"	1958	—	—	—	—	—	—	—N/a
"The All American Boy" (Note: Bare was incorrectly labeled on the record's release as "Bill Parsons".)	1958	2	—	—	9	—	—	—N/a
"Buddies with the Blues"	1959	—	—	—	—	—	—	—N/a
"More Than a Poor Boy Could Give"	1960	—	—	—	—	—	—	—N/a
"Lynchin' Party"	1960	—	—	—	—	—	—	—N/a
"Book of Love"	1961	— (Note: "Book of Love" did not enter the Hot 100, but peaked at number 6 on Bubbling Under Hot 100 Singles, which acts as a 25-song extension of the Hot 100.)	—	—	—	—	—	—N/a
"Sailor Man"	1961	—	—	—	—	—	—	—N/a
"That Mean Old Clock"	1961	—	—	—	—	—	—	—N/a
"Brooklyn Bridge"	1961	—	—	—	—	—	—	—N/a
"Shame on Me"	1962	23	18	—	78	18	—	"Detroit City" and Other Hits by Bobby Bare
"I Don't Believe I'll Fall in Love Today"	1962	— (Note: "I Don't Believe I'll Fall in Love Today" did not enter the Hot 100, but peaked at number 18 on Bubbling Under Hot 100 Singles, which acts as a 25-song extension of the Hot 100.)	—	—	—	40	—	"Detroit City" and Other Hits by Bobby Bare
"I'd Fight the World"	1963	—	—	—	—	—	—	"Detroit City" and Other Hits by Bobby Bare
"Detroit City"	1963	16	6	4	93	—	—	"Detroit City" and Other Hits by Bobby Bare
"500 Miles Away from Home"	1963	10	5	4	47	7	—	500 Miles Away from Home
"Miller's Cave"	1964	33	4	12	81	13	—	The Best of Bobby Bare
"Have I Stayed Away Too Long"	1964	94	47	—	—	—	—	The Best of Bobby Bare
"He Was a Friend of Mine"	1964	— (Note: "He Was a Friend of Mine" did not enter the Hot 100, but peaked at number 34 on Bubbling Under Hot 100 Singles, which acts as a 25-song extension of the Hot 100.)	—	—	—	—	—	—N/a
"Four Strong Winds"	1964	60	3	9	—	40	—	The Best of Bobby Bare
"Times Are Gettin' Hard"	1965	—	30	—	—	—	—	Constant Sorrow
"It's Alright"	1965	— (Note: "It's Alright" did not enter the Hot 100, but peaked at number 22 on Bubbling Under Hot 100 Singles, which acts as a 25-song extension of the Hot 100.)	7	—	—	—	—	The Best of Bobby Bare
"Just to Satisfy You"	1965	—	31	—	—	—	—	Constant Sorrow
"Talk Me Some Sense"	1965	—	26	—	—	—	—	Talk Me Some Sense
"In the Same Old Way"	1966	— (Note: "In the Same Old Way" did not enter the Hot 100, but peaked at number 31 on Bubbling Under Hot 100 Singles, which acts as a 25-song extension of the Hot 100.)	34	—	—	—	—	—N/a
"The Streets of Baltimore"	1966	— (Note: "Streets of Baltimore" did not enter the Hot 100, but peaked at number 24 on Bubbling Under Hot 100 Singles, which acts as a 25-song extension of the Hot 100.)	5	—	—	—	—	The Streets of Baltimore
"Homesick"	1966	—	38	—	—	—	—	The Game of Triangles
"Charleston Railroad Tavern"	1967	—	16	—	—	—	—	The Best of Bobby Bare Vol. 2
"Come Kiss Me Love"	1967	—	14	—	—	—	—	The Best of Bobby Bare Vol. 2
"The Piney Wood Hills"	1967	—	15	—	—	—	—	The Best of Bobby Bare Vol. 2
"Find Out What's Happening"	1968	—	15	—	—	—	5	The English Country Side
"A Little Bit Later on Down the Line"	1968	—	14	—	—	—	7	Talk Me Some Sense
"The Town That Broke My Heart"	1968	—	16	—	—	—	21	—N/a
"(Margie's At) The Lincoln Park Inn"	1969	—	4	—	—	—	7	(Margie's At) The Lincoln Park Inn and Other Controversial Songs
"Which One Will It Be"	1969	—	19	—	—	—	—	—N/a
"God Bless America Again"	1969	—	16	—	—	—	—	—N/a
"How I Got to Memphis"	1970	—	3	—	—	—	22	This Is Bare Country
"Come Sundown"	1970	— (Note: "Come Sundown" did not enter the Hot 100, but peaked at number 22 on Bubbling Under Hot 100 Singles, which acts as a 25-song extension of the Hot 100.)	7	—	—	—	6	This Is Bare Country
"Please Don't Tell Me How the Story Ends"	1971	—	8	—	—	—	3	Where Have All the Seasons Gone
"Short and Sweet"	1971	—	57	—	—	—	—	I Need Some Good News Bad
"What Am I Gonna Do"	1972	—	13	—	—	—	24	What Am I Gonna Do
"Sylvia's Mother"	1972	—	12	—	—	—	17	—N/a
"I Hate Goodbyes"	1972	—	25	—	—	—	38	I Hate Goodbyes/ Ride Me Down Easy
"Ride Me Down Easy"	1973	—	11	—	—	—	4	I Hate Goodbyes/ Ride Me Down Easy
"You Know Who"	1973	—	30	—	—	—	13	I Hate Goodbyes/ Ride Me Down Easy
"Daddy, What If" (with Bobby Bare Jr.)	1973	41	2	14	—	53	5	Bobby Bare Sings Lullabys, Legends and Lies
"Marie Laveau"	1974	—	1	—	—	—	1	Bobby Bare Sings Lullabys, Legends and Lies
"Back in Huntsville Again"	1975	—	23	—	—	—	14	Hard Time Hungrys
"Alimony"	1975	—	18	—	—	—	38	Hard Time Hungrys
"Cowboys and Daddys"	1975	—	29	—	—	—	20	Cowboys and Daddys
"The Winner"	1976	—	13	—	—	—	—	The Winner and Other Losers
"Put a Little Lovin' on Me"	1976	—	23	—	—	—	23	The Winner and Other Losers
"Drop Kick Me Jesus"	1976	—	17	—	—	—	18	The Winner and Other Losers
"Look Who I'm Cheating on Tonight"	1977	—	21	—	—	—	10	Me and McDill
"Red-Neck Hippie Romance"	1977	—	85	—	—	—	—	—N/a
"Too Many Nights Alone"	1978	—	29	—	—	—	15	Bare
"Sleep Tight, Good Night Man"	1978	—	11	—	—	—	8	Sleeper Wherever I Fall
"Healin'"	1979	—	23	—	—	—	30	Sleeper Wherever I Fall
"'Til I Gain Control Again"	1979	—	42	—	—	—	47	—N/a
"Numbers"	1979	—	11	—	—	—	26	Down & Dirty
"Tequila Sheila"	1980	—	31	—	—	—	64	Down & Dirty
"Food Blues"	1980	—	41	—	—	—	63	Drunk & Crazy
"Willie Jones" (with Charlie Daniels)	1980	—	19	—	—	—	15	Drunk & Crazy
"Learning to Live Again"	1981	—	28	—	—	—	—	As Is
"Take Me as I Am (Or Let Me Go)"	1981	—	28	—	—	—	34	As Is
"Dropping Out of Sight"	1981	—	35	—	—	—	—	As Is
"New Cut Road"	1982	—	18	—	—	—	32	As Is
"If You Ain't Got Nothin' (You Got Nothin' to Lose)"	1982	—	31	—	—	—	31	Ain't Got Nothin' to Lose
"(I'm Not) a Candle in the Wind"	1982	—	37	—	—	—	—	Ain't Got Nothin' to Lose
"Praise the Lord and Send Me the Money"	1982	—	83	—	—	—	—	Ain't Got Nothin' to Lose
"The Jogger"	1983	—	29	—	—	—	19	Drinkin' from the Bottle, Singin' from the Heart
"Diet Song"	1983	—	69	—	—	—	—	Drinkin' from the Bottle, Singin' from the Heart
"When I Get Home"	1985	—	53	—	—	—	51	—N/a
"Reno and Me"	1985	—	76	—	—	—	—	—N/a
"Wait Until Tomorrow"	1986	—	—	—	—	—	—	—N/a
"Real Good"	1986	—	—	—	—	—	—	—N/a
"Are You Sincere"	2005	—	—	—	—	—	—	The Moon Was Blue
"Things Change" (with Petter Øien)	2012	—	—	—	—	—	—	Things Change
"Snowflake in the Wind"	2019	—	—	—	—	—	—	—N/a
"—" denotes a recording that did not chart or was not released in that territory.

=== As a collaborative artist ===
List of singles, with selected chart positions, and other relevant details
Title	Year	Peak chart positions			Album
Title	Year	US Bub.	US Cou.	CAN Cou.	Album
"I'm Hangin' Up My Rifle" (with Johnny and the Jokers)	1959	—	—	—	—N/a
"A Dear John Letter" (with Skeeter Davis)	1965	14	11	—	Tunes for Two
"The Game of Triangles" (with Liz Anderson and Norma Jean)	1966	—	5	—	The Game of Triangles
"Your Husband, My Wife" (with Skeeter Davis)	1970	—	22	—	Your Husband, My Wife
"Where I'd Come From" (with Jeannie Bare)	1974	—	41	—	Singin' in the Kitchen
"Singin' in the Kitchen" (credited as Bobby Bare and the Family)	1975	—	29	43	Singin' in the Kitchen
"It's a Dirty Job" (with Lacy J. Dalton)	1983	—	30	—	—N/a
"Still Gonna Die" (credited as Old Dogs)	1999	—	—	—	Old Dogs
"—" denotes a recording that did not chart or was not released in that territory.

=== As a featured artist ===
List of singles, with selected chart positions, and other relevant details
Title	Year	Peak chart positions		Album
Title	Year	US Cou.	CAN Cou.	Album
"No Memories Hangin' Round" (Rosanne Cash with Bobby Bare)	1979	17	38	Right or Wrong
"We Love the Same Girl" (John Brack with Bobby Bare)	1987	—	—	Hard Times
"Simple Goodbye" (John Brack with Bobby Bare)	1990	—	—	Face to Face
"—" denotes a recording that did not chart or was not released in that territory.

=== German singles ===
List of singles, with selected chart positions, and other relevant details
Title	Year	Peak chart positions	Album
Title	Year	GER	Album
"Detroit City" (German release)	1963	40	"Detroit City" and Other Hits by Bobby Bare
"Lille Glauben Das Ich Gluecklick Bin"	1964	26	—N/a
"Abilene"	1965	—	—N/a
"Das Haus Auf Der Sierra"	1965	—	—N/a
"Molly Brown"	1965	—	—N/a
"—" denotes a recording that did not chart or was not released in that territory.

== Music videos ==
List of music videos, with release year
Title	Year
"Drunk & Crazy"	1980
"Food Blues"	1980
"Song of the South"	1980
