= Bobby Bare albums discography =

Bobby Bare discography
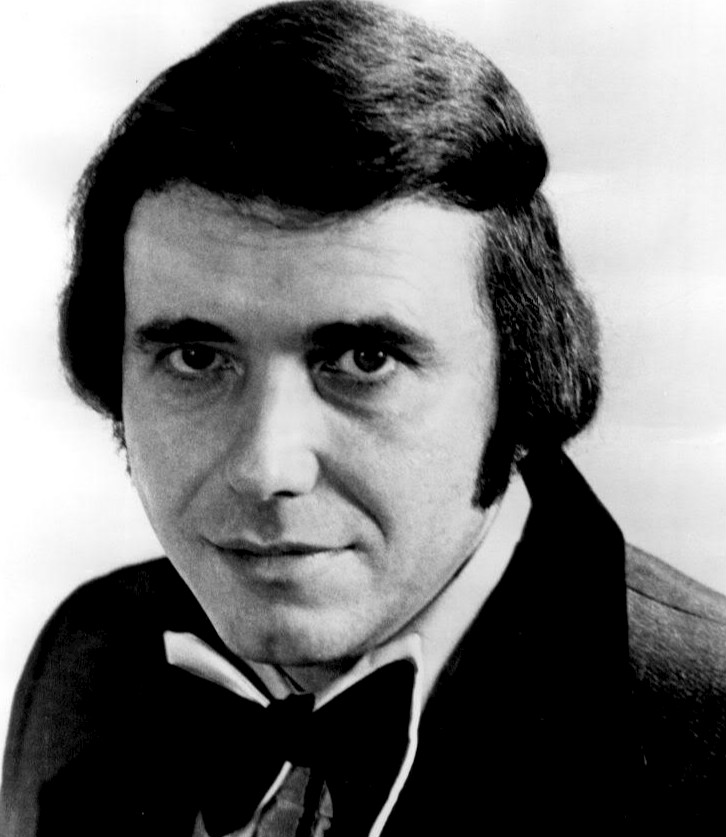
- Bare in 1973
- Studio albums: 39
- Live albums: 1
- Compilation albums: 28
- Box sets: 2

The albums discography of American country artist Bobby Bare contains 39 studio albums, 28 compilation albums, two box sets and one live album. Bare's first album was a compilation released in August 1963 on RCA Victor titled "Detroit City" and Other Hits by Bobby Bare. The disc was one of several to reach the top ten of the American Billboard Top Country Albums chart. It also reached number 119 on the Billboard 200 albums chart. It was followed by his debut studio LP in December 1963 by RCA Victor titled 500 Miles Away from Home. The disc reached similar chart positions on the Billboard country and 200 albums lists. Bare's follow-up LP's reached the country albums top ten in 1966: Talk Me Some Sense and The Streets of Baltimore. He also collaborated with Skeeter Davis during this time on the studio disc Tunes for Two (1965), which charted at number eight on the country albums list. In 1967, he collaborated with Liz Anderson and Norma Jean on the trio studio album called The Game of Triangles. Bare remained with RCA Victor until 1969, releasing his final album with the label that year called "Margie's at the Lincoln Park Inn" (And Other Controversial Songs).

In the early seventies, Bare recorded five studio albums for Mercury Records. His most successful was 1972's What Am I Gonna Do, which reached number 19 on the Top Country Albums chart. Bare returned to RCA Victor in 1973 and the label released six studio discs through 1977. Among them was 1973's Bobby Bare Sings Lullaby's, Legends and Lies. The disc was his most successful album to chart the Top Country Albums list, climbing to the number five position. Between 1978 and 1983, he recorded seven studio albums with Columbia Records. This included 1980's Down and Dirty, which became Bare's first LP to chart in Canada, climbing to number four on their RPM Country Albums chart. His 1982 album, Ain't Got Nothin' to Lose, was his final charting album as a solo artist. Bare has since continued to record sporadically. In the eighties and nineties, he issued two albums of Christmas music on independent labels. Under Atlantic Nashville, he released the project Old Dogs with several other country artists. His most recent album was 2020's Great American Saturday Night.

== Studio albums ==
=== As lead artist ===
List of albums, with selected chart positions, showing other relevant details
Title	Album details	Peak chart positions		
Title	Album details	US	US Cou.	CAN Cou.
500 Miles Away from Home	Released: December 1963; Label: RCA Victor; Formats: LP	133	9	—
The Travelin' Bare	Released: September 1964; Label: RCA Victor; Formats: LP	—	14	—
Constant Sorrow	Released: June 1965; Label: RCA Victor; Formats: LP	—	—	—
Talk Me Some Sense	Released: February 1966; Label: RCA Victor; Formats: LP	—	6	—
The Streets of Baltimore	Released: September 1966; Label: RCA Victor; Formats: LP	—	7	—
This I Believe	Released: December 1966; Label: RCA Victor; Formats: LP	—	17	—
A Bird Named Yesterday	Released: June 1967; Label: RCA Victor; Formats: LP	—	20	—
"(Margie's At) The Lincoln Park Inn" and Other Controversial Songs	Released: May 1969; Label: RCA Victor; Formats: LP	—	39	—
This Is Bare Country	Released: July 1970; Label: Mercury; Formats: LP	—	37	—
The Real Thing	Released: September 1970; Label: RCA Victor; Formats: LP	—	—	—
Where Have All the Seasons Gone	Released: January 1971; Label: Mercury; Formats: LP	—	44	—
I Need Some Good News Bad	Released: July 1971; Label: Mercury; Formats: LP	—	—	—
What Am I Gonna Do	Released: April 1972; Label: Mercury; Formats: LP	—	19	—
I Hate Goodbyes/Ride Me Down Easy	Released: March 1973; Label: RCA Victor; Formats: LP	—	31	—
Bobby Bare Sings Lullabys, Legends and Lies	Released: November 1973; Label: RCA Victor; Formats: LP	—	5	—
Hard Time Hungrys	Released: April 1975; Label: RCA Victor; Formats: LP	—	33	—
Cowboys and Daddys	Released: November 1975; Label: RCA Victor; Formats: LP	—	21	—
The Winner and Other Losers	Released: June 1976; Label: RCA Victor; Formats: LP	205	18	—
Me and McDill	Released: January 1977; Label: RCA Victor; Formats: LP	—	27	—
Bare	Released: April 1978; Label: Columbia; Formats: LP	—	44	—
Sleeper Wherever I Fall	Released: October 1978; Label: Columbia; Formats: LP, cassette	—	—	—
Down & Dirty	Released: March 1980; Label: Columbia; Formats: LP, cassette	—	21	4
Drunk & Crazy	Released: September 1980; Label: Columbia; Formats: LP, cassette	—	47	17
As Is	Released: June 1981; Label: Columbia; Formats: LP, cassette	204	43	—
Ain't Got Nothin' to Lose	Released: June 1982; Label: Columbia; Formats: LP, cassette	—	29	—
Drinkin' from the Bottle, Singin' from the Heart	Released: 1983; Label: Columbia; Formats: LP, cassette	—	—	—
Merry Christmas from Bobby Bare	Released: October 1988; Label: Sugar Bear; Formats: LP	—	—	—
Fishin' Songs	Released: 1989; Label: Montana Country; Formats: LP	—	—	—
I Love an Old Fashioned Christmas	Released: November 1993; Label: Fiasco; Formats: CD	—	—	—
The Moon Was Blue	Released: November 1, 2005; Label: Dualtone; Formats: CD	—	—	—
Darker Than Light	Released: November 13, 2012; Label: Plowboy; Formats: LP, CD	—	—	—
Things Change	Released: May 26, 2017; Label: BFD/Hypermedia Nashville; Formats: LP, CD, music download	—	—	—
Great American Saturday Night	Released: April 17, 2020; Label: BFD; Formats: CD, music download	—	—	—
"—" denotes a recording that did not chart or was not released in that territory.

=== As a collaborative artist ===
List of albums, with selected chart positions, showing other relevant details
Title	Album details	Peak chart positions
Title	Album details	US Country
Tunes for Two (with Skeeter Davis)	Released: February 1965; Label: RCA Victor; Formats: LP	8
The Game of Triangles (with Liz Anderson and Norma Jean)	Released: January 1967; Label: RCA Victor; Formats: LP	18
The English Country Side (with The Hillsiders)	Released: November 1967; Label: RCA Victor; Formats: LP	29
Your Husband, My Wife (with Skeeter Davis)	Released: March 1970; Label: RCA Victor; Formats: LP	—
Singin' in the Kitchen (credited as Bobby Bare and the Family)	Released: August 1974; Label: RCA Victor; Formats: LP	36
Old Dogs (with Waylon Jennings, Jerry Reed and Mel Tillis)	Released: 1998; Label: Atlantic Nashville; Formats: CD, cassette	61
"—" denotes a recording that did not chart or was not released in that territory.

== Compilation albums ==
List of albums, with selected chart positions, showing other relevant details
Title	Album details	Peak chart positions	
Title	Album details	US	US Cou.
"Detroit City" and Other Hits by Bobby Bare	Released: August 1963; Label: RCA Victor; Formats: LP	119	9
Special Delivery from Bobby Bare...Joey Powers...Roy Orbison (with Joey Powers and Roy Orbison)	Released: 1964; Label: RCA Camden; Formats: LP	—	—
The Best of Bobby Bare	Released: January 1966; Label: RCA Victor; Formats: LP	—	—
The Best of Bobby Bare Volume 2	Released: April 1968; Label: RCA Victor; Formats: LP	—	33
I'm a Long Way from Home	Released: 1971; Label: RCA Camden; Formats: LP	—	—
This Is Bobby Bare	Released: December 1972; Label: RCA Victor; Formats: LP	—	—
Memphis, Tennessee	Released: 1973; Label: RCA Camden; Formats: LP	—	—
Sunday Mornin' Comin' Down	Released: 1975; Label: RCA Camden; Formats: LP	—	—
Bobby Bare's Greatest Hits	Released: 1974; Label: Sun; Formats: LP	—	—
The Very Best of Bobby Bare	Released: 1975; Label: United Artists; Formats: LP	—	—
The Hits of Bobby Bare	Released: 1977; Label: RCA Victor; Formats: LP, cassette	—	—
Famous Country Music Makers	Released: 1979; Label: RCA Victor; Formats: LP	—	—
Encore	Released: 1981; Label: Columbia; Formats: LP, cassette	—	—
Greatest Hits	Released: 1981; Label: RCA Victor; Formats: LP, cassette	—	—
20 of the Best	Released: 1982; Label: RCA International; Formats: LP, cassette	—	—
Biggest Hits	Released: 1982; Label: Columbia; Formats: LP, cassette	—	—
Country Classics	Released: 1983; Label: Columbia; Formats: LP, cassette	—	—
The Gambler	Released: 1985; Label: Epic; Formats: CD	—	—
Collector's Series	Released: 1985; Label: RCA Victor; Formats: LP	—	—
Lasoes 'N Spurs	Released: 1991; Label: RCA/BMG; Formats: CD	—	—
The Best of Bobby Bare	Released: 1994; Label: Razor & Tie; Formats: CD	—	—
The Essential Bobby Bare	Released: January 28, 1997; Label: RCA; Formats: CD	—	—
Pure Country	Released: August 25, 1998; Label: Sony; Formats: CD	—	—
Bare Tracks: The Columbia Years	Released: February 16, 1999; Label: Koch; Formats: CD	—	—
The Singles: 1959-1969	Released: March 13, 2001; Label: RCA/BMG; Formats: CD	—	—
All American Country	Released: September 22, 2003; Label: RCA/BMG; Formats: CD	—	—
Super Hits	Released: June 22, 2004; Label: RCA; Formats: CD	—	—
16 Biggest Hits	Released: March 27, 2007; Label: RCA; Formats: CD	—	—
"—" denotes a recording that did not chart or was not released in that territory.

== Box Sets ==
List of box sets, showing relevant ideals
Title	Album details
The Mercury Years	Released: 1987; Label: Bear Family; Formats: CD
All-American Boy	Released: 1994; Label: Bear Family; Formats: CD

== Live albums ==
List of box sets, showing relevant ideals
Title	Album details
Live at Gilley's	Released: July 27, 1999; Label: Atlantic/Q; Formats: CD
