= Funny Familiar Forgotten Feelings =

Funny Familiar Forgotten Feelings may refer to:

- "Funny Familiar Forgotten Feelings" (song), a 1966 song by Don Gibson, covered by Tom Jones
- Funny Familiar Forgotten Feelings (album), a 1967 album by Tom Jones
