= Houston (song) =

- Dutch release picture sleeve

Single by Dean Martin

from the album Houston
- B-side: "Bumming Around"
- Released: 1965
- Genre: Country pop
- Length: 2:38
- Label: Reprise
- Songwriter: Lee Hazlewood
- Producer: Jimmy Bowen

Dean Martin singles chronology
"(Remember Me) I'm the One Who Loves You" (1965)	"Houston" (1965)	"I Will" (1965)

"Houston" is a song written by Lee Hazlewood and first recorded in 1964 by Sanford Clark and best known from a hit version by Dean Martin.

== Background ==
The lyrics are from the perspective on a down-on-his-luck drifter who describes himself as "a walkin' case of the blues". The verses describe his many misfortunes ("Saw a dollar yesterday, but the wind blew it away"), each ending with the repeated refrain "Going back to Houston, Houston, Houston ...". The mood lightens on the final verse when the narrator reveals that despite his woes, he has a girlfriend waiting for him in the titular city. However, the narrator clarifies this by saying, "at least, she said she'd be." Musically, the song is orchestrated country pop with a medium tempo and strolling rhythm, with a brief harmonica solo. Sources differ as to how the distinctive percussive sound at the beginning and end of the song was created.

== Dean Martin recording ==
"Houston" was a hit in 1965 when recorded by Dean Martin. Dean Martin's daughter, Deana Martin, has recounted her father telling her that the percussive sound was created by tapping an empty Coca-Cola bottle with a spoon, while Hal Blaine once stated that he created the sound by tapping a glass ash tray with a triangle wand.

== Chart performance ==
Martin's version spent 9 weeks on the Billboard Hot 100 chart, peaking at No. 21, while reaching No. 2 on Billboard's Easy Listening chart, and No. 11 on Canada's CHUM Hit Parade.

Chart (1965)	Peak position
US Billboard Hot 100	21
US Billboard Easy Listening	2
Canada — CHUM Hit Parade	11

== Cover versions ==
Bobby Bare recorded the song for his album, The Streets of Baltimore, released in 1966.

The English post-punk group The Fall recorded a version of the song on The Real New Fall LP (Formerly Country on the Click) (2003). Apart from a harsh electronic introduction and minor changes to the lyrics, e.g., chasing a £10 note rather than a dollar, The Fall interpretation is faithful to the original's melody and basic structure.
