= 500 Miles Away from Home (album) =

Studio album by Bobby Bare
- Released: December 1963
- Recorded: August 1963 – October 1963
- Studio: RCA Victor Nashville studios
- Genres: Country; Nashville sound
- Label: RCA Victor
- Producer: Chet Atkins

Bobby Bare chronology
"Detroit City" and Other Hits by Bobby Bare (1963)	500 Miles Away from Home (1963)	The Travelin' Bare (1964)

Singles from 500 Miles Away from Home
- 1. "500 Miles Away from Home" Released: September 1963

500 Miles Away from Home is the debut studio album by American country artist Bobby Bare. It was released in December 1963 by RCA Victor and contained 12 tracks. RCA Victor had previously released a compilation album of Bare's songs. The album's title track was released as a single in 1963. The single reached the top 10 on the American country, pop, and adult contemporary music charts. The album itself reached the top 10 of the American country albums chart. It received a positive reception from AllMusic in later years.

== Background, recording and content ==
Bobby Bare launched his career as a pop and rock singer with the 1958 top-10 American single, "The All American Boy". Bare became increasingly dissatisfied with his musical choices, and decided to relaunch himself as a country artist in the '60s. He signed with RCA Victor and had a crossover country pop single with "Detroit City" (1963). It was followed by a remake of the folk tune, "500 Miles Away from Home", which reached similar crossover commercial success. His debut studio album was also named 500 Miles Away from Home. The project was recorded at RCA Victor Studios in Nashville, Tennessee, held between August and October 1963, and produced by Chet Atkins.

The project contained a total of 12 songs. Along with the title track, a series of cover recordings were included on the album. Among them were A. P. Carter's "Homestead on the Farm" and the traditional folk song, "Worried Man Blues". Other covers included George Hamilton IV's "Abilene". Hamilton's original version topped the American country chart earlier in 1963. The album also featured a cover of Billy Grammer's 1958 top-five country single, "Gotta Travel On". Original material was also featured, including two songs composed by Bare himself: "Let Me Tell You About Mary" and "Jeannie's Last Kiss".

== Release, reception, and singles ==
Professional ratings
Review scores
Source	Rating
AllMusic	4.5/5 stars
The Rolling Stone Record Guide	3/5 stars

500 Miles Away from Home was originally released in December 1963 by RCA Victor. It was the debut studio album of Bare's career and his second with the label. RCA originally distributed the project as a vinyl LP, with six songs on each side of the record. In its original release, the album spent 9 weeks on the American Billboard Top Country Albums chart. It peaked at number 9 on the chart the week of February 28, 1964 and became his second top-10 album on the chart. It also became Bare's second album to chart the Billboard 200, peaking at number 133 on February 8, 1964.

500 Miles Away from Home was met with a positive reception in later years from AllMusic at 4.5 out of 5 possible stars. They also named the project's title track as an "album track pick". The only single included on the album was the title track, which was originally released by RCA Victor in September 1963. It became Bare's second top-10 single on the Billboard Hot Country Songs chart, peaking at number five. Crossing over onto the Billboard Hot 100, it became his second top-10 single on that chart, as well, peaking at number 10. On the Billboard adult contemporary chart, the song reached the number four position.

== Track listings ==
=== Vinyl version ===
Side one
No.	Title	Writer(s)	Length
1.	"500 Miles Away from Home"	Bobby Bare; Hedy West; Charlie Williams	2:35
2.	"Homestead on the Farm"	A. P. Carter	2:27
3.	"Let Me Tell You About Mary"	Bare	1:58
4.	"Abilene"	Lester Brown; Bob Gibson; John D. Loudermilk	2:10
5.	"Gotta Travel On"	Paul Clayton; Larry Ehrlich; Dave Lazer; The Weavers	2:11
6.	"Lynchin' Party"	Harlan Howard	2:40

Side two
No.	Title	Writer(s)	Length
1.	"Worried Man Blues"	Carter	3:22
2.	"I Wonder Where You Are Tonight"	Peter Bond	2:32
3.	"Noah's Ark"	Dorsey Burnette; Barry De Vorzon	2:55
4.	"Sailor Man"	Howard	2:24
5.	"What Kind of Bird Is That"	Hank Cochran	2:42
6.	"Jeannie's Last Kiss"	Bare; Williams	3:00

=== Digital version ===
Music download and streaming
No.	Title	Writer(s)	Length
1.	"500 Miles Away from Home"	Bare; West; Williams	2:42
2.	"Homestead on the Farm"	Carter	2:30
3.	"Let Me Tell You About Mary"	Bare	2:00
4.	"Abilene"	Brown; Gibson; Loudermilk	2:13
5.	"Gotta Travel On"	Clayton; Ehrlich; Lazer; The Weavers	2:12
6.	"Lynchin' Party"	Howard	2:42
7.	"Worried Man Blues"	Carter	3:22
8.	"I Wonder Where You Are Tonight"	Bond	2:33
9.	"Noah's Ark"	Burnette; De Vorzon	2:57
10.	"Sailor Man"	Howard	2:24
11.	"What Kind of Bird Is That"	Cochran	2:46
12.	"Jeannie's Last Kiss"	Bare; Williams	3:02

== Chart performance ==
Chart (1963–1964)	Peak position
US Billboard 200	133
US Top Country Albums (Billboard)	9

== Release history ==
Region	Date	Format	Label	Ref.
North America	December 1963	Vinyl	RCA Victor	
United Kingdom	December 1963	Vinyl	RCA Victor	
North America	2010s	Music download; streaming	Sony Music Entertainment	
