= Memphis Beat (album) =

Studio album by Jerry Lee Lewis
- Released: 1966
- Recorded: 1963, 1965, 1966
- Genre: Rock; country
- Length: 14:48 (Side A); 15:10 (Side B); 29:58 (Total)
- Label: Smash
- Producer: Shelby Singleton

Jerry Lee Lewis chronology
Country Songs for City Folks/All Country (1965)	Memphis Beat (1966)	By Request: More of the Greatest Live Show on Earth (1966)

Memphis Beat is the fifth album by Jerry Lee Lewis released on the Smash label march 1966.

== Recording ==
More than half the songs on Memphis Beat were recorded on January 5 and 6, 1966 at Phillips Studio in Memphis. The remaining selections were taken from a rare New York City session eight months earlier and Lewis's earliest sessions at Smash in 1963. The album includes one of the few songs composed by Lewis called "Lincoln Limousine," a remarkable tribute to John F. Kennedy. In his book Jerry Lee Lewis: Lost and Found, Joe Bonomo calls the track "simply weird, so ambiguous and amateurishly written that it's impossible to determine exactly what motivated him to write it." The album also includes "Too Young," a piano lounge number that Bonomo deems "a real laugher" and "hysterically uncomfortable." Most of the other songs show a more familiar side of Lewis, up-tempo Boogie and Blues standards such as "Drinkin' Wine, Spo-Dee-O-Dee" and "Big Boss Man", the Swamp pop classic "Mathilda" from Cookie and his Cupcakes, and George Jones' Country classic "She Thinks I Still Care." Two cover songs were selected as the album's singles, but neither Sham the Sham's "Memphis Beat" nor Ray Charles' "Sticks and Stones" reached the Billboard charts.

== Reception ==
After Memphis Beat was released in May 1966, it stalled at 145 on the Billboard albums chart. Lewis's commercial slump would continue until 1968, when he finally broke on the country charts with "Another Place, Another Time." In 2014 Lewis biographer Rick Bragg wrote, "Throughout the mid-1960s he cut one album after another of other people's music...But none of it was new, not really." Bruce Eder of AllMusic praises the album: "After veering hard into country (and country-pop) territory with Country Songs for City Folks, Jerry Lee Lewis came roaring back with Memphis Beat in 1966, featuring his hardest rocking sounds in years, and a band who were as good as any with whom he'd ever recorded."

== Track listing ==
Side A
No.	Title	Writer(s)	Length
1.	"Memphis Beat"	Milton Addington; Dick Lipscombe; Allen Reynolds	2:52
2.	"Mathilda"	George Khoury; Huey Thierry	2:17
3.	"Drinkin' Wine, Spo-Dee-O-Dee"	Stick McGhee; J. Mayo Williams	2:17
4.	"Hallelujah I Love Her So"	Ray Charles	2:32
5.	"She Thinks I Still Care"	Dick Lipscombe - Steve Duffy	2:50
6.	"Just Because"	Sid Robin; Bob Shelton, Joe Shelton	2:00
Total length:			14:48

Side B
No.	Title	Writer(s)	Length
1.	"Sticks and Stones"	Henry Glover	2:06
2.	"Whenever You're Ready"	Cecil J. Harrelson	1:50
3.	"Lincoln Limousine"	Jerry Lee Lewis	2:38
4.	"Big Boss Man"	Luther Dixon; Al Smith	2:52
5.	"Too Young"	Sylvia Dee; Sid Lippman	3:00
6.	"The Urge"	Donnie Fritts	2:44
Total length:			15:10
