= "Detroit City" and Other Hits by Bobby Bare =

Compilation album by Bobby Bare
- Released: August 1963
- Recorded: December 1960 – April 1963
- Studio: RCA Victor Studios; United Recording Company
- Genre: Country; Nashville Sound
- Label: RCA Victor
- Producer: Chet Atkins; Bobby Bare; Barry De Vorzon

Bobby Bare chronology
"Detroit City" and Other Hits by Bobby Bare (1963)	500 Miles Away from Home (1963)

Singles from "Detroit City" and Other Hits by Bobby Bare
- 1. "Shame on Me" Released: May 1962; 2. "I Don't Believe I'll Fall in Love Today" Released: October 1962; 3. "I'd Fight the World" Released: February 1963; 4. "Detroit City" Released: May 1963

"Detroit City" and Other Hits by Bobby Bare is a compilation album released by American country artist, Bobby Bare. It was released in August 1963 by RCA Victor and was his debut album. The album included previously recorded singles originally released by Fraternity Records such as "Book of Love" (1961). It also included Bare's first RCA Victor singles, such as "Shame on Me" (1962) and "Detroit City" (1963). The LP reached the top ten of the American country albums chart and reached a lower position on the American Billboard 200.

== Background, recording and content ==
Bobby Bare first had found success as a pop singer with 1958's "The All American Boy". For several years, he toured with other pop and rock artists such as Bobby Darin and Roy Orbison. Unhappy with his musical trajectory, he reinvented himself as a country music artist in the sixties and signed with the RCA Victor label. Under the production of Chet Atkins, he had a charting single in 1962 with "Shame on Me". It was then followed by country-pop crossover single, "Detroit City" in 1963. "Detroit City" and Other Hits by Bobby Bare compiled his recordings on RCA Victor and on the Fraternity labels. The tracks were recorded between December 1960 and April 1963. The earliest recordings with Fraternity were produced by Bare himself, along with Barry De Vorzon. His later recordings with RCA Victor were produced by Chet Atkins.

A total of 12 tracks were included on the compilation. The album mixed some of Bare's self-written compositions, such as the 1961 single titled "Brooklyn Bridge". Other self-penned tunes were "Book of Love" and "Dear Wastebasket". Bare's Fraternity recordings featured on the project included "The All-American Boy" and "Book of Love". Remaining tracks were RCA Victor recordings such as "Shame on Me", "She Called Me Baby", "Detroit City" and "I'd Fight the World".

== Release, reception and singles ==
"Detroit City" and Other Hits by Bobby Bare was released in August 1963 on the RCA Victor label. With its release, it became the first full-length album in Bare's career. It was originally distributed as a vinyl LP, containing six songs on either side of the record. Decades later, it was re-released to digital markets via Sony Music Entertainment. In its original release, the LP spent six weeks on the American Billboard Top Country Albums chart, peaking at number nine in January 1964. It became one six albums in his career to reach the country albums top ten. It also reached number 119 on the Billboard 200 albums chart, becoming only one of two LP's to reach that list in his career.

The album has since drawn critical attention. In September 1963, it was reviewed by Billboard magazine. The magazine highlighted several album tracks and found that his recent single ("Detroit City") brought notable attention to the project. Decades later, it was reviewed by AllMusic, which gave it a 4.5 star rating: "Though there are some weak tracks on the disc, this is one of the strongest and most exciting collections of Bare's music, showcasing the songwriter in his earliest stages. He might not have perfected his sound, but it is thrilling to hear him sort it out."

Although several earlier Fraternity singles were included on the album, Bare's RCA releases were the only singles technically spawned from the project. Its first was "Shame on Me", which was issued in May 1962. It was Bare's first to reach the Billboard Hot Country Songs chart, peaking at number 18 in 1962. It also reached number 23 on the Billboard Hot 100 that year. It was followed in October 1962 by the single "I Don't Believe I'll Fall in Love Today", which reached number 18 on Billboard's Bubbling Under Hot 100 chart. "I'd Fight the World" was then released by RCA Victor in February 1963. The last RCA single included was "Detroit City", which was issued in May 1963. The song became Bare's highest-charting single to date and gave him greater commercial success. "Detroit City" reached number six on the Billboard country chart and number 16 on the Hot 100.

== Track listings ==
=== Vinyl version ===
Side one
No.	Title	Writer(s)	Length
1.	"Detroit City"	Danny Dill; Mel Tillis	2:48
2.	"Is It Wrong (For Loving You)"	Warner McPherson	2:10
3.	"Lorena"	C. Williams	2:09
4.	"Shame on Me"	Bill Enis; Lawton Williams	2:43
5.	"I'd Fight the World"	Joe Allison; Hank Cochran	2:34
6.	"Dear Wastebasket"	Bobby Bare; Curtis Leach	2:34

Side two
No.	Title	Writer(s)	Length
1.	"All-American Boy"	Orville Lunsford; Bill Parsons	2:59
2.	"I Don't Believe I'll Fall in Love Today"	Harlan Howard	2:06
3.	"Brooklyn Bridge"	Bare	2:25
4.	"She Called Me Baby"	Howard	2:13
5.	"The Gods Were Angry with Me"	Watt Watkins; Roma Wilkinson	2:17
6.	"Book of Love"	Bare; Lance Guynes	2:11

=== Digital version ===
Music download and streaming
No.	Title	Writer(s)	Length
1.	"Detroit City"	Dill; Tillis	2:48
2.	"Is It Wrong (For Loving You)"	McPherson	2:12
3.	"Lorena"	Williams	2:08
4.	"Shame on Me"	Enis; Williams	2:46
5.	"I'd Fight the World"	Allison; Cochran	2:37
6.	"Dear Wastebasket"	Bare; Leach	2:36
7.	"All American Boy"	Lunsford; Parsons	3:01
8.	"I Don't Believe I'll Fall in Love Today"	Howard	2:08
9.	"Brooklyn Bridge"	Bare	2:25
10.	"She Called Me Baby"	Howard	2:14
11.	"The Gods Were Angry with Me"	Watkins; Wilkinson	2:21
12.	"Book of Love"	Bare; Guynes	2:05

== Chart performance ==
Chart (1963)	Peak position
US Billboard 200	119
US Top Country Albums (Billboard)	9

== Release history ==
Region	Date	Format	Label	Ref.
North America	August 1963	Vinyl	RCA Victor	
North America	2010s	Music download; streaming	Sony Music Entertainment	
