= Country Songs for City Folks =

Studio album by Jerry Lee Lewis
- Released: 1965
- Recorded: August–September 1965 in Nashville, Tennessee
- Genre: Country
- Length: 16:02 (Side A); 16:19 (Side B); 32:21 (Total)
- Label: Smash
- Producer: Shelby Singleton

Jerry Lee Lewis chronology
The Return of Rock (1965)	Country Songs for City Folks (1965)	Memphis Beat (1966)

Country Songs for City Folks is the fifth studio album by American musician and pianist Jerry Lee Lewis, released on the Smash label in 1965.

== Reception ==
Professional ratings
Review scores
Source	Rating
Record Mirror	3/5 stars

Country Songs for City Folks did not crack the Billboard chart, although it did rise to number 39 on the country albums chart when it was released again under the title All Country in the wake of Lewis's comeback four years later. Bruce Eder of AllMusic calls it "an astoundingly good country album," singling out the performances on Willie Nelson's "Funny How Time Slips Away" and Hank Thompson's honky-tonk lament "The Wild Side of Life."

== Track listing ==
Side A

No.	Title	Writer(s)	Length
1.	"Green, Green Grass of Home"	Curly Putman	2:43
2.	"Wolverton Mountain"	Merle Kilgore; Claude King	2:59
3.	"Funny How Time Slips Away"	Willie Nelson	2:58
4.	"North to Alaska" (featuring Linda Gail Lewis)	Mike Phillips	2:01
5.	"The Wild Side of Life"	A.P. Carter; William Warren	3:12
6.	"Walk Right In"	Gus Cannon; Hosea Woods	2:09
Total length:			16:02

Side B

No.	Title	Writer(s)	Length
1.	"City Lights"	Bill Anderson	2:28
2.	"Ring of Fire"	June Carter Cash; Merle Kilgore	2:17
3.	"Detroit City"	Danny Dill; Mel Tillis	2:47
4.	"Crazy Arms"	Ralph Mooney; Chuck Seals	2:31
5.	"King of the Road"	Roger Miller	2:16
6.	"Seasons of My Heart"	George Jones; Darrell Edwards	4:00
Total length:			16:19
