= Another Place, Another Time (Del Reeves song) =

- Norwegian release picture sleeve

Single by Jerry Lee Lewis

from the album Another Place, Another Time
- B-side: "Walking the Floor over You"
- Released: March 9, 1968
- Studio: Columbia (Nashville, Tennessee)
- Genre: Country
- Length: 2:25
- Label: Smash (US and Canada); Mercury (Europe)
- Songwriter: Jerry Chesnut
- Producer: Jerry Kennedy

Jerry Lee Lewis singles chronology
"Turn On Your Love Light" (1967)	"Another Place, Another Time" (1968)	"What's Made Milwaukee Famous (Has Made a Loser Out of Me)" (1968)

"Another Place, Another Time" is a song written by Jerry Chesnut and originally recorded by Del Reeves.

It was later covered by Jerry Lee Lewis as the title track for his album of the same name in 1968, which become a top ten hit in the US country charts, peaking at number 4, remaining on the charts for 17 weeks. His cover was nominated for a Grammy Award. At the same year, another cover was recorded by Arthur Alexander.

== Jerry Lee Lewis version ==
Jerry Lee Lewis's cover became the title track of his 1968 album, Another Place, Another Time, which was also released as a single, with "Walking the Floor over You" as its B-side.

Based on the liner notes to the 2002 Raven Records reissue of Lewis's album, his cover became a top 5 hit, whereas Del Reeves's original was "unsuccessful". It is considered Lewis's comeback song as he finally broke on the country charts, effectively ending his commercial slump.

According to a book by Ken Burke, the "one man responsible" for changing the fortunes of Jerry Lee Lewis's flagging career was Eddie Kilroy. It was Kilroy who suggested that Lewis record "Another Place, Another Time" with a more modern country sound, and the record kick-started Lewis's late 1960s career revival.

== Critical reception ==
Joe Viglione from AllMusic writes:

"To a lonely room waiting for another place, another time" it almost sounds like Tom Jones going into his "They'll all come to see me" line on "Green Green Grass of Home", a country song that crossed over with the help of a pop crooner. Yes, Jerry Lee Lewis hit home runs in the country market, but Garth Brooks he would not be, for you can isolate the aggressive energy for some hit singles in this arena, and though it was perfectly suited to this rock pioneer's voice, the slow pace of "Another Place, Another Time" as well as "What Made Milwaukee Famous" [Note: another track from Lewis's 1968 album Another Place, Another Time] is almost to Lewis as far removed as Pat Boone doing his heavy metal album - though certainly without the idiocy. This single is evidence that Jerry Lee Lewis could go toe to toe with a Hank Williams Jr., who also recorded the song, not only go toe to toe but actually pick up all the marbles while at the gaming table.

== Track listing ==
7" single (Mercury 127 331 MCF, 1968, Europe)
No.	Title	Length
1.	"Another Place, Another Time"	2:25
2.	"Walking the Floor over You"	2:05

== Charts ==
Chart (1968)	Peak position
RPM Top Singles	73
US Billboard Hot 100	97
US Hot Country Songs (Billboard)	4
