= From the Heart (Tom Jones album) =

Studio album by Tom Jones
- Released: September 1966
- Label: Decca
- Producer: Peter Sullivan

Tom Jones (Decca) chronology
A-tom-ic Jones (1966)	From the Heart (1966)	Green, Green Grass of Home (1967)

From the Heart is the third UK album by Tom Jones, released in 1966 on Decca Records. The LP is composed largely of pop standards. It was not released in North America, where Parrot Records recompiled many of its tracks into Jones' fourth album there, Green, Green Grass of Home, featuring his hit single of the same name.

The front cover design, a photograph of Jones overlooking his hometown of Pontypridd, was taken on Graig Mountain, on the path above Graig Terrace that leads to Upper Alma Terrace in Treforest.

== Track listing ==
Side 1

1. "Begin the Beguine" (Cole Porter)
2. "You Came a Long Way from St. Louis" (John Benson Brooks, Bob Russell)
3. "My Foolish Heart" (Ned Washington, Victor Young)
4. "It's Magic" (Jule Styne, Sammy Cahn)
5. "Someday" (Jimmie Hodges)
6. "Georgia on My Mind" (Hoagy Carmichael, Stuart Gorrell)
7. "Kansas City" (Jerry Leiber, Mike Stoller)

Side 2

1. "Hello Young Lovers" (Richard Rodgers, Oscar Hammerstein)
2. "A Taste of Honey" (Bobby Scott, Ric Marlow)
3. "The Nearness of You" (Hoagy Carmichael, Ned Washington)
4. "When I Fall in Love" (Edward Heyman, Victor Young)
5. "If Ever I Would Leave You" (Frederick Loewe, Alan Jay Lerner)
6. "My Prayer" (Georges Boulanger, Jimmy Kennedy)
7. "That Old Black Magic" (Harold Arlen, Johnny Mercer)

== Personnel ==
- Charles Blackwell, John Scott, Johnny Harris — arrangements
- Bill Price — engineer
- Tony Frank — photography
