= Bop Till You Drop =

Studio album by Ry Cooder
- Released: July 1979
- Recorded: Warner Brothers Recording Studios, North Hollywood, California
- Genres: R&B; blues rock
- Length: 39:56
- Label: Warner Bros.
- Producer: Ry Cooder

Ry Cooder chronology
Jazz (1978)	Bop Till You Drop (1979)	Borderline (1980)

Singles from Bop Till You Drop
- 1. "Little Sister / Down in Hollywood" Released: 1979

Bop Till You Drop is the eighth studio album by American musician Ry Cooder, released in July 1979 by Warner Bros. Records. It peaked at number 62 on the US Billboard 200 and also reached the top ten in New Zealand and Norway.

The album consists almost entirely of covers of earlier rhythm and blues and rock and roll classics, including Elvis Presley's "Little Sister" and the 1965 Fontella Bass-Bobby McClure hit "Don't Mess Up a Good Thing", on which Cooder duetted with soul star Chaka Khan. Khan also performed on the only original track on the album, "Down in Hollywood".

Bop Till You Drop was the first digitally recorded major-label album in popular music. The album was recorded at Amigo Studios in North Hollywood, Los Angeles on a digital 32-track machine built by 3M, which at the time carried a price tag of $115,000. When discussing the impact of the digital recording process, Cooder commented that "for the first time, we are hearing back exactly what we played. Instead of noise, we hear each little sound perfectly...For guitars, the textures come out. You get that real finger-chord skin sound, that brushy feel."

== Critical reception ==
Professional ratings
Review scores
Source	Rating
AllMusic	3/5 stars
Christgau's Record Guide	B+
DownBeat	5/5 stars
MusicHound Rock: The Essential Album Guide	3.5/5 stars
Music Week	3/4 stars
Rolling Stone	(favorable)

In their review of Bop Till You Drop, High Fidelity magazine said that Cooder had "taken the giant cohesive step merging his gospel-tinged vocals, Latin American guitar touches, and love of American r&b to form a new whole that's much more than the sum of its parts." Music Week thought that "Bop Till You Drop" was "arguably his best to date" and called the sound quality from the digital recording process "excellent". They also highlighted Cooder's duet with Chaka Khan on the song "Don't You Mess Up A Good Thing", which the publication thought would be a "good single". Writing for Sounds magazine, Peter Silverton said that he was "initially a little thrown by the texture of the sound" and had expected Cooder's album to sound "harsh, driving and fraying a little round the edges", with the end product sounding "cleaner" in sound quality than what he anticipated.

DownBeat gave the album a five-star rating and felt that Cooder interpreted and blended the genres of rhythm and blues and gospel music with "near-scholarly dedication, though without the pretensions and/or cooption to which those lighter-skinned champions of ethnic musics sometimes fall prey." In a retrospective review of the album, Brett Hartenbach of AllMusic expressed some criticism regarding the digital recording:

Cooder and his excellent band, which includes the rhythm section of Tim Drummond and Jim Keltner along with guitarist David Lindley, understand the material and are more than capable of laying down a decent groove, but something must have gotten lost in translation from what was played to what came across on the recording. There's a thinness to the tracks that undermines the performances, which according to Cooder is due to the digital recording.

== Track listing ==
No.	Title	Writer(s)	Length
1.	"Little Sister"	Doc Pomus; Mort Shuman	3:49
2.	"Go Home, Girl"	Arthur Alexander	5:10
3.	"The Very Thing That Makes You Rich (Makes Me Poor)"	Sidney Bailey	5:32
4.	"I Think It's Going to Work Out Fine"	Rose Marie McCoy; Sylvia McKinney	4:43
5.	"Down in Hollywood"	Ry Cooder; Tim Drummond	4:14
6.	"Look at Granny Run Run"	Jerry Ragovoy; Mort Shuman	3:09
7.	"Trouble, You Can't Fool Me"	Frederick Knight; Aaron Varnell
8.	"Don't Mess Up a Good Thing"	Oliver Sain	4:08
9.	"I Can't Win"	Lester Johnson; Clifton Knight; Dave Richardson	4:16

== Personnel ==
=== Musicians ===
- Jimmy Adams – backing vocals (3, 7)
- Ronnie Barron – organ (5), guitar (8)
- Ry Cooder – guitars, mandolin, lead vocals, backing vocals, producer
- Tim Drummond – bass guitar
- Cliff Givens – backing vocals (3)
- Rev. Patrick Henderson – organ (2)
- Milt Holland – percussion, drums
- Bill Johnson – backing vocals (3)
- Herman Johnson – backing vocals (1, 9)
- Jim Keltner – drums
- Chaka Khan – vocals (5, 8)
- Bobby King – vocals (5, 9), backing vocals (1, 2, 3, 7)
- David Lindley – guitar, mandolin
- Randy Lorenzo – backing vocals (2)
- George "Biggie" McFadden – backing vocals (7)
- Simon Pico Payne – backing vocals (3)
- Greg Prestopino – backing vocals (3)

=== Technical ===
- Loyd Clifft – assistant engineer
- David Alexander – photography
- Vicki Fortson – production coordination
- Lee Herschberg – engineer
- David Kraai – technical support
- Penny Ringwood – production coordination
- Mike Salisbury – design

== Charts ==
=== Weekly charts ===
Chart (1979–80)	Peak position
Australian Albums (Kent Music Report)	7
Canada Top Albums/CDs (RPM)	92
Dutch Albums (Album Top 100)	30
New Zealand Albums (RMNZ)	7
Norwegian Albums (VG-lista)	10
Swedish Albums (Sverigetopplistan)	25
US Billboard 200	62

=== Year-end charts ===
Chart (1980)	Position
New Zealand Albums (RMNZ)	29

== Certifications ==
Region	Certification	Certified units/sales
Australia (ARIA)	Platinum	70,000^{^}
^{^} Shipments figures based on certification alone.
