= By Request: More of the Greatest Live Show on Earth =

By Request: More of the Live Greatest Show on Earth

Live album by Jerry Lee Lewis
- Released: 1966
- Recorded: August 20, 1966
- Venues: Panther Hall, Fort Worth, Texas
- Genres: Rock and roll, rockabilly, country
- Label: Smash
- Producer: Shelby Singleton

Jerry Lee Lewis chronology
Memphis Beat (1966)	By Request: More of the Live Greatest Show on Earth (1966)	Soul My Way (1967)

By Request: More of the Greatest Live Show on Earth is a live album by American musician and singer Jerry Lee Lewis, released on Smash Records in 1966.

== Track listing ==
1. "Little Queenie" (Chuck Berry)
2. "How's My Ex Treating You" (Vic McAplin)
3. "Johnny B. Goode" (Chuck Berry)
4. "Green, Green Grass of Home" (Curly Putman)
5. "What'd I Say, Part II" (Ray Charles)
6. "You Win Again" (Hank Williams)
7. "I'll Sail My Ship Alone" (Moon Mulligan)
8. "Cryin' Time" (Buck Owens)
9. "Money" (Gordy Jr./Bradford)
10. "Roll Over Beethoven" (Berry)
