= Old Dogs =

Old Dogs may refer to:

- Old Dogs (group), a country supergroup
- Old Dogs (album), the debut album by the Old Dogs
- Old Dogs (film), a 2009 American comedy film
- "Old Dogs" (Doc Martin), a 2005 television episode

== See also ==
- Old Dog, a 2011 film
- Old Blind Dogs
- Old Dogs, New Dicks
- Flight of the Old Dog
- List of oldest dogs
