= Green, Green Grass of Home (album) =

Studio album by Tom Jones
- Released: 23 March 1967
- Recorded: 1966
- Genres: Country, soul
- Label: Decca
- Producer: Peter Sullivan

Tom Jones (Decca) chronology
From the Heart (1966)	Green, Green Grass of Home (1967)	Funny Familiar Forgotten Feelings (1967)

Singles from Green, Green Grass of Home
- 1. "Green, Green Grass of Home" Released: November 1966; 2. "Detroit City" Released: February 1967; 3. "Funny Familiar Forgotten Feelings" Released: April 1967

Professional ratings
Review scores
Source	Rating
AllMusic	3/5 stars

Green, Green Grass of Home is a 1967 album released by Tom Jones. His sixth overall album, it is his fourth studio album with Decca Records, produced by Peter Sullivan. The album was rush-released by Decca on Thursday, 23 March 1967.

London Records (Parrot label) (USA, Canada) released an abridged version of this album as Funny Familiar Forgotten Feelings (Parrot 71011), whilst that label's album titled Green, Green Grass of Home was largely made up of tracks from From the Heart.

== Reception ==
Stephen Thomas Erlewine of AllMusic notes with this album Jones "began to abandon his teenage pop audience to concentrate on a more mature, middle of the road group of listeners" but says the album is "inconsistent".

== Track listing ==
Side one

1. "Riders in the Sky" (Stan Jones)
2. "He'll Have to Go" (Audrey & Joe Allison)
3. "Funny Familiar Forgotten Feelings" (Mickey Newbury)
4. "Sixteen Tons" (Merle Travis)
5. "Two Brothers" (Irving Gordon)
6. "My Mother's Eyes" (Abel Baer, L. Wolfe Gilbert)
7. "Green, Green Grass of Home" (Curly Putman)

Side 2

1. "Ring of Fire" (June Carter Cash, Merle Kilgore)
2. "A Field of Yellow Daisies" (Charlie Rich)
3. "(I Wish I Could) Say No to You" (Mickey Newbury)
4. "All I Get From You Are Heartaches" (Al Frisch, Al J. Neiburg)
5. "Mohair Sam" (Dallas Frazier)
6. "Cool Water" (Bob Nolan)
7. "Detroit City" (Danny Dill, Mel Tillis)

== Certifications ==
Region	Certification	Certified units/sales
United States (RIAA)	Gold	500,000^{^}
^{^} Shipments figures based on certification alone.
