= You Don't Care =

Single by Arthur Alexander
- A-side: "Detroit City"
- Released: 1965
- Genre: Soul
- Length: 2:31
- Label: Dot Records
- Songwriters: Herb Ryals & Jerry Willis
- Producers: Noel Ball; Norman Petty; Bill Haney (uncredited)

"You Don't Care" is a song written by Herb Ryals and Jerry Willis. It was released as a single by Arthur Alexander in 1965 as the B-side to "Detroit City."

Music journalist Richard Younger describes "You Don't Care" is a "bluesy mid-tempo song. Allmusic critic Richie Unterberger describes the melody as "compelling" and "minor-shaded." Authors David Hatch and Stephen Millward note a resemblance to early Beatles songs written by John Lennon and Paul McCartney, who covered several of Alexander's songs although not this one. Hatch and Millward describe the vocal performance as incorporating country music mannerisms to a greater extent than Alexander had ever done previously. Unterberger describes Alexander's vocal performance as being "at his most sullen, suffusing the words in hurt without ever boiling over into anger." Unterberger also notes that George Tomsco's "fierce" guitar incorporated the emotional edge into the music. He particularly praises Tomsco's guitar part for its "sharp, chopped rhythm chords and the lean, piercing solo note runs," which make the part sound similar to the work of Rolling Stones guitarist Keith Richards. Rubber City Review also praises Tomsco's "blazing guitar." Unterberger also praises the bridge for its "yearning climax" as well as the harmony provided by the background vocalists.

Like "Detroit City," "You Don't Care" was originally recorded with just Alexander and a rhythm guitar with Bill Haney filling in for Alexander's usual producer Noel Ball, who had been recently diagnosed with terminal cancer. Haney sent the tapes to Norman Petty, who overdubbed Tomsco's guitar part.

Unterberger praises "You Don't Care" as one of several of Alexander's songs that sound like it should have been a hit, but wasn't. He has also described the song as "one of the most compelling soul tunes ever. Rubber City Review described the song as being "pure rock ‘n soul magic."
