= Funny Familiar Forgotten Feelings (song) =

"Funny, Familiar, Forgotten Feelings"

Single by Don Gibson

from the album More Country Soul
- Released: 1966
- Genre: Country
- Label: RCA Victor
- Songwriter: Mickey Newbury

"Funny Familiar Forgotten Feelings"

Single by Tom Jones

from the album Green, Green Grass of Home, Funny Familiar Forgotten Feelings
- Released: 1967
- Label: Decca

Tom Jones singles chronology
"Detroit City" (1967)	"Funny Familiar Forgotten Feelings" (1967)	"I'll Never Fall in Love Again" (1967)

Audio
- "Funny Familiar Forgotten Feelings" on YouTube

"Funny, Familiar, Forgotten Feelings" (or "Funny Familiar Forgotten Feelings") is a song written by Mickey Newbury and originally recorded and released in 1966 by American country singer Don Gibson. Don Gibson's recording was a top 10 country hit in the United States.

It was one of Newbury's earlier songwriting works along with "Here Comes the Rain, Baby" (that would be recorded by Roy Orbison and Eddy Arnold), "How I Love Them Old Songs" (Carl Smith), and "Sweet Memories" (Andy Williams, Willie Nelson). And it also became his very first songwriting hit.

In 1967, the song was covered by Welsh singer Tom Jones, becoming a global hit. Notably, Jones's cover reached number 7 in his native UK.

Tom Jones gave the song a soul vibe. His version has been described as "a waltz-time ballad with the clicked, plectrum-hit bass guitar notes underneath it." American Billboard wrote in its review: "Jones takes Don Gibson's country hit and adds the same warmth and blues feel that gave him a smash pop item in the country "Green, Green Grass of Home." This should fast prove another ballad winner for the stylist."

The song gave start to Newbury's string of hits as a songwriter — followed by "Just Dropped In" (a pop hit for Kenny Rogers and the First Edition), "Here Comes the Rain, Baby" (a country hit for Eddy Arnold), "Sweet Memories" (a hit for Andy Williams). Thus, at the age of 20-something he already came to be considered as "one of the best in the business". He also had a quality tenor voice himself and would later record this song as a singer.

== Charts ==
=== Don Gibson version ===
Chart (1966)	Peak position
US Hot Country Songs (Billboard)	8

=== Tom Jones version ===
Chart (1967)	Peak position
Belgium (Ultratop 50 Flanders)	3
Belgium (Ultratop 50 Wallonia)	28
Netherlands (Single Top 100)	9
New Zealand (Listener)	20
UK Singles (OCC)	7
US Billboard Hot 100	49
West Germany (GfK)	38
