= Judd Records =

Defunct American record label

Judd Records was started by Jud Phillips (died 1992), brother of Sun Records co-founder Sam Phillips. Early releases were mostly recorded in Nashville or Memphis, but carried an address of Memphis, New York City, and Florence, Alabama (Phillips' hometown). Judd Records was named for its founder but the name was misspelled in the artwork of the label having two "D's".

From Judd 1016 onward, the label was pressed and distributed by National Recording Corporation, and the label sported the NRC logo and/or the words "National Recording Corporation - Atlanta, GA". According to Jud Phillips' son, NRC acquired the Judd label originally on a handshake deal.

Judd's biggest single was "Rockin' Little Angel" by Ray Smith, which topped out at #22 on the Billboard charts.

Another Judd artist who went on to score on other labels was Tommy Roe. Roe's initial recordings on Judd were originally released on Mark Four, a label produced by Roe's manager, Cleve Warnock, but recorded at the NRC Studios in Atlanta. Arthur Alexander also released his first single on Judd "Sally Sue Brown/The Girl That Radiates That Charm" under his high-school nickname June Alexander. The only Judd album, Ray Smith's "Rockin' Little Angel", has been released on CD by NRC.

Other Ray Smith single cuts have been released on CD by London-based Ace Records. Almost all of Ray Smith's Judd and Sun studio tracks and cuts have been released on Germany's Bear Family Records Records. NRC, Judd, and affiliated labels are owned and administered by National Recording Corporation.

== See also ==
- List of record labels
