= Go Home Girl =

Single by Arthur Alexander
- B-side: "You're the Reason"
- Released: November 1962
- Genre: Soul
- Length: 2:26
- Label: Dot Records
- Songwriter(s): Arthur Alexander
- Producer(s): Noel Ball

Arthur Alexander singles chronology
"Anna (Go to Him)" (1962)	"Go Home Girl" (1962)	"Dream Girl" (1963)

"Go Home Girl" is a song written by Arthur Alexander. It was originally released in 1962 as Alexander's follow-up single to "Anna." It has since been recorded by the Rolling Stones, Ry Cooder, Gary U.S. Bonds and Frank Black.

== Arthur Alexander version ==
Like "Anna," "Go Home Girl" was inspired by Alexander's difficulties with his wife. The lyrics portray the singer in love with his best friend's girlfriend, and therefore insisting on breaking off the relationship with the girl in order to preserve his friendship. Alexander biographer Richard Younger describes the song as taking "the moralistic view of a man who decides that it is wrong to romance his best friend's girl." The music incorporates elements of both country and R&B music. Rubber City Review detects a country music twang in the vocal performance. Author Roben Jones notes that the melody and structure of "Go Home Girl" was similar to that of Alexander's first single "You Better Move On." Instrumentation includes string instruments and Alexander is backed by a chorus in parts. Younger points out a number of similarities between "Go Home Girl" and Alexander's previous releases, including "sparse drum and piano figure," "choppy guitars," "off-beat cymbals" and "lush female vocals."

Upon its release, Billboard Magazine predicted that it could be a big hit, based on its "touching quality" and "impelling beat." Cash Box described it as "a poignant, self-penned shuffle-rock-a-cha-cha...that Arthur waxes with loads of feeling." Author Michael Gray described the song as "impeccable." No Depression noted that despite not achieving the commercial success of "You Better Move On," "Go Home Girl" as well as "Anna" confirmed that his artistic talent hadn't diminished.

Alexander rerecorded the song under the title "Go on Home Girl" for his 1972 self-titled album.

== Cover versions ==
Ry Cooder covered the song on his 1979 album Bop Till You Drop. Mojo Magazine described Cooder's portrayal of the brokenhearted singer attempting to act stoic as worthy of an Academy Award. High Fidelity Magazine described the "Mexican-style" guitar part as "splendid," and also praised Tim Drummond's diversified bass guitar lines. The song originally had just two verses and two choruses, but Cooder's version gains a third verse & chorus couplet in which Frank lends his car to his friend, unaware that the latter's passenger is Franks's girlfriend. The friend tells her he is "trying to forget the things that we've done while Frank is just a-waiting back home", and he makes the decision: "Girl you can't go ride with me anymore; that's the way it's got to be from now on".

Gary U.S. Bonds and Frank Black performed the song as a duet on the 1994 album Adios Amigo: A Tribute to Arthur Alexander. The Rolling Stones recorded "Go Home Girl" on November 14, 1963, in a session in which they also recorded a version of Alexander's first single "You Better Move On." However, this recording has not been officially released.
