= Soul My Way =

Studio album by Jerry Lee Lewis
- Released: 1967
- Recorded: May and August, 1967
- Genre: Soul; R&B; rock
- Length: 26:56
- Label: Smash
- Producer: Jerry Kennedy

Jerry Lee Lewis chronology
By Request: More of the Greatest Live Show on Earth (1966)	Soul My Way (1967)	Another Place, Another Time (1968)

Soul My Way is the seventh studio album by American musician and pianist Jerry Lee Lewis, released on Smash in 1967.

== Track listing ==
No.	Title	Writer(s)	Length
1.	"Turn on Your Love Light"	Deadric Malone; Joseph Scott	2:33
2.	"It's a Hang Up, Baby"	Eddie Reeves	2:17
3.	"Dream Baby (How Long Must I Dream)"	Cindy Walker	2:28
4.	"Just Dropped In"	Mickey Newbury	2:27
5.	"Wedding Bells"	Claude Boone	2:33
6.	"He Took It Like a Man"	Jerry Lee Lewis	1:53
7.	"Hey! Baby"	Bruce Channel; Margaret Cobb	2:11
8.	"Treat Her Right"	Roy Head	2:01
9.	"Holdin' On"	Majorie Barton; Bobby Dyson	3:06
10.	"Shotgun Man"	Cecil Harrelson	2:45
11.	"I Betcha Gonna Like It"	Buddy Killen; Robert Riley	2:42
Total length:			26:56
