= Ray Smith (rockabilly singer) =

American singer-songwriter (1934–1979)

- Born: October 30, 1934; Melber, Kentucky, United States
- Died: November 29, 1979 (aged 45) Burlington, Ontario, Canada
- Genres: Rock and roll, rockabilly, R&B, country
- Occupations: Singer, songwriter, musician
- Instruments: Vocals, piano, guitar
- Years active: 1956–1979
- Labels: Sun Records; Judd Records; Vee-Jay Records; Tollie Records; Smash Records; Boot Records; Various independent record labels
- Formerly of: Ray Smith and the Country Boys
- Website: Ray Smith's Rockabilly Hall of Fame page

Ray Smith (October 30, 1934 – November 29, 1979) was an American rockabilly musician.

== Career ==
Smith recorded for Vee-Jay Records, Tollie Records, Smash Records, Sun Records and Boot Records during his career, and had a hit with the song "Rockin' Little Angel" in 1960 on Judd Records. "Rockin' Little Angel" took a portion of its melody from the 1844 song "Buffalo Gals". The record sold over one million copies, earning a gold disc. It reached #22 on the Billboard Hot 100. Smith often recorded material written by Charlie Rich, and was influenced by Elvis Presley. Smith gave a concert at "Karregat" Hall in Eindhoven on April 21, 1979. It is recorded on an album called The Rocking Side and released by a Dutch label (Rockhouse, LP 7909).

== Death ==
Smith committed suicide at his home in Burlington, Ontario Canada on November 29, 1979, at the age of 45, leaving behind his wife Lillian, and children Sheila, Johnny and Ray Jr. Smith's Judd and Sun singles and session material have been released on Germany's Bear Family Records.
