= Arthur Alexander (album) =

1972 studio album by Arthur Alexander

Studio album by Arthur Alexander
- Released: April 1972
- Recorded: November 1971
- Studio: FAME Studios, Muscle Shoals, AL
- Length: 30:52
- Label: Warner Bros.
- Producer: Tommy Cogbill

Arthur Alexander chronology
You Better Move On (1962)	Arthur Alexander (1972)	Lonely Just Like Me (1993)

Professional ratings
Review scores
Source	Rating
AllMusic	4/5 stars
The Rolling Stone Album Guide	3/5 stars

Arthur Alexander is the second studio album by Arthur Alexander, released in 1972. A 1989 UK reissue by Ace Records included two additional tracks, and an expanded edition was released in 2017 by Omnivore Recordings with six additional tracks.

== Track listing ==
1. "I'm Comin' Home" (Dennis Linde) – 1:55
2. "It Hurts to Want It So Bad" (Steve Smith, Tim Smith, Charles Feldman) – 2:17
3. "Go on Home Girl" (Arthur Alexander) – 2:43
4. "In the Middle of It All" (Arthur Alexander) – 3:05
5. "Burning Love" (Dennis Linde) – 2:39
6. "Rainbow Road" (Donnie Fritts, Dan Penn) – 3:25
7. "Love's Where Life Begins" (Arthur Alexander, Dale Ward) – 2:05
8. "Down the Back Roads" (Jackie Cook, Steve Cropper, Mary V. Williams) – 2:27
9. "Call Me Honey" (Dennis Linde) – 2:17
10. "Come Along With Me" (Arthur Alexander, Donnie Fritts) – 2:42
11. "Call Me in Tahiti" (Dennis Linde) – 2:23
12. "Thank God He Came" (Arthur Alexander, Donnie Fritts) – 2:54

1989 reissue bonus tracks:

1. "Lover Please" (Billy Swan) – 2:42
2. "They'll Do It Every Time" (Arthur Alexander, Thomas Cain) – 2:47

2017 expanded edition bonus tracks:

1. "Mr. John" (Arthur Alexander, Thomas Cain)
2. "You Got Me Knockin'" (Arthur Alexander, Ed Williams, Steve Hostak, Thomas Cain)
3. "Lover Please" (Billy Swan)
4. "They'll Do It Every Time" (Arthur Alexander, Thomas Cain)
5. "I Don't Want Nobody" (previously un-issued)
6. "Simple Song of Love" (previously un-issued)

== Personnel ==
- Arthur Alexander – vocals
- Bobby Wood - piano
- Hayword Bishop - drums
- Thomas Cain - piano
- Gene Chrisman - drums
- Johnny Christopher - guitar
- Tommy Cogbill - bass
- Shane Keister - keyboards
- Bobby Emmons - keyboards
- Eddie Hinton - guitar
- Mike Leech - bass, string arrangements
- Kenny Malone - drums
- Reggie Young - guitar
- Charles Chalmers - horn arrangements

Technical

- Ed Thrasher - art direction
- Jon Echevarrieta - design
- John Donegan - photography
