= Lonely Just Like Me =

Studio album by Arthur Alexander
- Released: 1993
- Genres: Soul, country soul
- Label: Elektra/Nonesuch
- Producers: Ben Vaughn, Thomas Cain

Arthur Alexander chronology
Arthur Alexander (1972)	Lonely Just Like Me (1993)	The Ultimate Arthur Alexander (1993)

Lonely Just Like Me is the third studio album by the American musician Arthur Alexander, released in 1993. It was Alexander's first album in 21 years. He died shortly after its release. Alexander considered the music to be "country soul".

The album was reissued in 2007, with additional tracks that had been recorded for NPR.

== Production ==
The album was produced by Ben Vaughn and Thomas Cain as part of Elektra/Nonesuch's "American Explorer" album series. Some songs were demoed in a hotel room in Cleveland; Alexander had been working as a bus driver in the city. Donnie Fritts, who had worked with Alexander during his Muscle Shoals days, cowrote a few songs; Muscle Shoals alumni Spooner Oldham and Dan Penn played on the album. It was recorded in Nashville.

== Critical reception ==
Professional ratings
Review scores
Source	Rating
AllMusic	4/5 stars
Chicago Tribune	3.5/4 stars
The Encyclopedia of Popular Music	3/5 stars
MusicHound R&B: The Essential Album Guide	4/5 stars
Orlando Sentinel	4/5 stars
(The New) Rolling Stone Album Guide	3.5/5 stars
Vancouver Sun	4/4 stars

The Chicago Tribune called the album "one of the finest examples of [the country soul] sound to appear since the Muscle Shoals heyday." The Orlando Sentinel wrote: "On the heartbroken yet resilient 'All the Time', Alexander makes 'do-doodaly-doo' sound like the saddest syllables in the world—next to his words: 'If they took apart my heart/ just to see what they could see/ well they'd see misery/ where you keep hurting me'." The Globe and Mail deemed it "a wistful, graceful take on classic soul that shows off Alexander's skills both as a songwriter and as a singer." The Los Angeles Times noted that "his voice isn't always as taut as when he was younger but it still carries the uncommon sense of melancholy that characterized his early records."

(The New) Rolling Stone Album Guide praised the "surprisingly emotional new material."

== Track listing ==
No.	Title	Length
1.	"If It's Really Got to Be This Way"
2.	"Go Home Girl"
3.	"Sally Sue Brown"
4.	"Mr. John"
5.	"Lonely Just Like Me"
6.	"Every Day I Have to Cry"
7.	"In the Middle of It All"
8.	"Genie in the Jug"
9.	"Johnny Heartbreak"
10.	"All the Time"
11.	"There Is a Road"
12.	"I Believe in Miracles"

The Final Chapter (expanded edition)

No.	Title	Length
1.	"If It's Really Got to Be This Way"
2.	"Go Home Girl"
3.	"Sally Sue Brown"
4.	"All the Time"
5.	"Lonely Just Like Me"
6.	"Every Day I Have to Cry"
7.	"In the Middle of It All"
8.	"Genie in the Jug"
9.	"Mr. John"
10.	"Johnny Heartbreak"
11.	"There Is a Road"
12.	"I Believe in Miracles"
13.	"Go Home Girl (live on Fresh Air – 1993)"
14.	"Genie in the Jug (live on Fresh Air – 1993)"
15.	"You Better Nove On (live on Fresh Air – 1993)"
16.	"Every Day I Have to Cry (live on Fresh Air – 1993)"
17.	"Solitary Man (hotel demo)"
18.	"Johnny Heartbreak (hotel demo)"
19.	"Genie in the Jug (hotel demo)"
20.	"Lonely Just Like Me (hotel demo)"
21.	"Anna (live at the Bottom Line, NYC – 1991)"
