= Streets of Baltimore =

1966 country song written by Tompall Glaser and Harlan Howard

"Streets of Baltimore" is a heavily covered country song written by Tompall Glaser and Harlan Howard in 1966.

Although Glaser co-wrote the song, his group, Tompall Glaser & The Glaser Brothers, were not the first to record the song. Bobby Bare released his Chet Atkins-produced version in June 1966; the Glasers recorded theirs in September 1966.

The singer tells us he left his home to take his wife to where she wanted to be: Baltimore. After working hard and trying to make a home, and despite feeling proud to give his woman what she was longing for as well as kind of liking said streets, he finds out his wife loves the Baltimore night life more than she loves him, so he returns to his Tennessee farm without her.

Gram Parsons' version of the song has been featured on the HBO series The Wire, which is set in Baltimore.

Pitchfork said, "Gram Parsons may have made it famous, but "Streets of Baltimore" belongs to Bobby Bare. From his album of the same name, it is a relic of Bare's first stint on the RCA Victor label, widely regarded to be his breakout period in country music. Bare's tender croon lends the song believable longing and regret, while the otherwise simple arrangement ups the drama with countrypolitan 'oohs' and 'ahhs'."

== Recordings ==
- Bleed the Dream
- Bobby Bare
- The Del McCoury Band
- The Flying Burrito Brothers
- Nanci Griffith & John Prine
- John Prine
- Jim Lauderdale
- The Little Willies
- Gram Parsons & Emmylou Harris
- Charley Pride
- Red Meat
- Skik (as De grachten van Amsterdam)
- The Statler Brothers
- Evan Dando
- Bill Kirchen
- The Bats
- The Bottle Rockets
- Tom Russell
- Daniel O'Donnell
- Uncle Tupelo
- Willie Nelson
- The Lemonheads
- Marc Ellington
