= Gotta Travel On =

Single by Billy Grammer
- B-side: "Chasing a Dream"
- Released: October 1958
- Studio: RCA Victor, Nashville, Tennessee
- Genre: Country
- Length: 2:24
- Label: Monument
- Songwriters: Paul Clayton, The Weavers, Larry Ehrlich, Dave Lazer

Billy Grammer singles chronology
"Gotta Travel On" (1958)	"Bonaparte's Retreat" (1959)

"Gotta Travel On" is an American folksong. The earliest known version was printed in Carl Sandburg's The American Songbag in 1927 under the title "Yonder Comes the High Sheriff" and several variations were recorded in the 1920s, but the best known version is credited to Paul Clayton, The Weavers, Larry Ehrlich, and Dave Lazer and was first recorded by Pete Seeger in 1958.

A 1958 recording by Billy Grammer backed by the Anita Kerr Singers reached #4 on the U.S. pop chart, #5 on the U.S. country chart, #2 in Canada, #6 in Australia, and #14 on the U.S. R&B chart in 1959. The recording ranked #53 on Billboard magazine's Top 100 singles of 1959.

== Other charting versions ==
- Bill Monroe & His Bluegrass Boys released a version of the song as a single in 1959 which reached #15 on the U.S. country chart.
- The Springfields released a version of the song as a single in 1962 which reached #114 on the U.S. pop chart.
- Timi Yuro released a version of the song as a single in 1963 which reached #64 on both the U.S. pop and R&B charts.
- Damita Jo released a version of the song as a single in 1965 which reached #119 on the U.S. pop chart.

== Other versions ==
- Ollis Martin (as "Police and High Sheriff Come Ridin' Down") (Gennett 6306, 1928; rec. 1927; on StuffDreams1)
- Poplin Family, (as "Goin' Back to Sumter") on Poplin01
- Harry Belafonte released a version of the song on his 1958 EP Belafonte.
- Joe Gordon released a version of the song as a single in 1959, but it did not chart.
- Rose And Cal Maddox featuring The Jack Wayne Band released a version of the song as a single in 1959, but it did not chart.
- Chris Barber's Jazz Band recorded this on their 1959 LP "Barber in Berlin" recorded 23 May 1959
- The Weavers released a version of the song on their 1959 EP Travelling with The Weavers Volume 1.
- Cisco Houston released a version of the song on his 1960 album Cisco Houston Sings Songs of the Open Road.
- Bert Berns released a version of the song as the B-side to his 1960 single "The Legend of the Alamo".
- The Limeliters included the song on their 1962 album Sing Out.
- Bobby Bare released a version of the song on his 1963 EP Meet Bobby Bare.
- Trini Lopez released a version of the song on his 1963 album Trini Lopez at PJ's as part of a medley with "Down by the Riverside", "Marianne", "When the Saints Go Marching In", and "Volare".
- Towa Carson released a version of the song entitled "Jag måste ge mej av”, Swedish lyrics by Peter Himmelstrand, as the B-side to her 1964 single "Hjärta".
- Milly Scott released a version of the song entitled "Ik moet verder" as the B-side to her 1964 single "Kom Huil Dan".
- Carola released a version of the song entitled "Nyt nostan kytkimen" as a single in 1964, but it did not chart.
- Pete Fountain released a version of the song as the B-side to his 1965 single "Mae".
- Boots Randolph released a version of the song on his 1965 EP More Yakety Sax.
- Ray Bryant Trio released a version of the song as the B-side to his 1966 single "It Was a Very Good Year".
- Larry Ramos released a version of the song as the B-side to his 1966 single "It'll Take a Little Time".
- Allen Toussaint released a version of the song as the B-side to his 1968 single "Get Out of My Life, Woman".
- Jerry Naylor released a version of the song as the B-side to his 1969 single "Posters on the Wall".
- Bob Dylan released a version of the song on his 1970 album Self Portrait.
- Johnny Kidd & The Pirates released a version of the song on the 1965 single Shakin'All Over / Gotta Travel On.
- Glen Campbell released a version of the song on his 1969 live album, Glen Campbell Live.
- The Seekers also recorded the song.
- Anita Bryant.
- Jimmie Dale Gilmore released a version of the song on his 2005 album Come on Back
- Neil Young does a version of the song on his 2012 album Americana.
- Buddy Holly performed the song as the opening number on his final, "Winter Dance Party" Tour.
