= Another Place, Another Time (album) =

Studio album by Jerry Lee Lewis
- Released: June 1968
- Studio: Columbia (Nashville, Tennessee)
- Genre: Country, honky-tonk
- Length: 27:33
- Label: Smash
- Producer: Jerry Kennedy

Jerry Lee Lewis chronology
Soul My Way (1968)	Another Place, Another Time (1968)	She Still Comes Around (1969)

Another Place, Another Time is the eighth studio album by American musician Jerry Lee Lewis, released in 1968 by Smash Records. It was Lewis's "comeback album" and features a stripped down, "hardcore" country sound that yielded two top five country hits, his first major chart success in a decade.

== Background ==
In Nick Tosches' Lewis biography, Hellfire, Kilroy recalls calling every credible publisher in Nashville asking for material for Lewis, but only three tapes turned up after two weeks, adding, "That was all the material that had come in. Nobody wanted a Jerry Lee Lewis cut. I thought, Holy God, this is embarrassing."

== Track listing ==
No.	Title	Writer(s)	Length
1.	"What's Made Milwaukee Famous (Has Made a Loser Out of Me)"	Glenn Sutton	2:37
2.	"Play Me a Song I Can Cry To"	Jerry Chesnut	2:53
3.	"On the Back Row"	Chesnut; Norro Wilson	2:50
4.	"Walking the Floor Over You"	Ernest Tubb	2:09
5.	"All Night Long"	Don Chapel	2:34
6.	"I'm a Lonesome Fugitive"	Casey Anderson; Liz Anderson	3:01
7.	"Another Place, Another Time"	Chesnut	2:27
8.	"Break My Mind"	John D. Loudermilk	2:28
9.	"Before the Next Teardrop Falls"	Vivian Keith; Ben Peters	2:07
10.	"All the Good Is Gone"	Dottie Bruce; Norro Wilson	2:14
11.	"We Live in Two Different Worlds" (with Linda Gail Lewis)	Fred Rose	2:13
Total length:			27:33
