= Billy Grammer =

American country music singer-songwriter (1925–2011)

Background information
- Birth name: Billy Wayne Grammer
- Born: August 28, 1925; Benton, Illinois, U.S.
- Died: August 10, 2011 (aged 85); Benton, Illinois, U.S.
- Genres: Country
- Occupation: Singer-songwriter
- Instrument(s): Guitar, vocals
- Years active: 1959–1969
- Labels: Monument, London, Decca, Epic

Billy Wayne Grammer (August 28, 1925 – August 10, 2011) was an American country music singer and accomplished guitar player. He recorded the million-selling "Gotta Travel On", which made it onto both the country and pop music charts in 1959. Grammer would become a regular performer on the Grand Ole Opry, eventually designing, and marketing his namesake guitar after co-founding a guitar company, in Nashville, Tennessee.

== Biography ==
Grammer, the eldest of 13 children (nine boys and four girls), was born in Benton, Illinois. His father was a musician; he played the violin and trumpet.

He served in the US Army during World War II, and upon discharge worked as an apprentice toolmaker at the Washington Naval gun factory at Shop No. 20. Grammer married his high-school girlfriend, Ruth Burzynski, in 1944. Shortly after the war ended, 18,000 of a 24,000-strong workforce were laid off, including Grammer. The couple returned to their home in Franklin County, Illinois.

=== Music career ===
When Grammer and his wife were living in Washington D.C., he was hired by Connie B. Gay as a singer in support of Gay's WARL radio program: Town and Country Time. When Gay was preparing to replace the session guitarist, Grammer demonstrated his own guitar prowess, and was re-contracted in a dual-role as both singer and lead guitarist.

After being signed by Monument Records in Nashville, Tennessee, Grammer scored a big hit with the million-selling single: "Gotta Travel On", copyrighted by David Lazar, Larry Ehrlich, Paul Clayton and Tom Six. The song peaked at No. 4 on the U.S. Pop Singles chart and No. 5 on the Hot Country Songs chart in 1959. That same year, he became a regular cast member on the Grand Ole Opry. Grammer named his band after his most notable hit as The Travel On Boys. "Gotta Travel On" was used as the opening song by Buddy Holly on his final tour in January and February 1959, which ended in tragedy. He recorded the first chart version of Bobby Bare's "Detroit City", entitled "I Wanna Go Home". It hit the Billboard country chart in early 1963.

Grammer founded RG&G (Reid, Grammer & Gower) Company in 1965 with Clyde Reid and J.W. Gower. RG&G made the Grammer guitar from 1965 until 1968, when a fire consumed the factory in downtown Nashville. The company was then sold to Ampeg, and a new factory was erected down the street from the old one. The company was renamed Grammer Guitar, Inc. (GGI). GGI produced the Grammer guitar until 1970. His guitar was installed into the Country Music Hall of Fame in Nashville on March 1, 1969.

On May 15, 1972, Grammer and the Travel on Boys played at the rally in Laurel, Maryland where Alabama governor George Wallace was shot. Grammer and his band played the "Under the Double Eagle" march as Wallace mounted the stage to speak. After he spoke, Wallace mingled with the crowd, and Arthur Bremer shot a concealed handgun at the presidential candidate. The outcome was Wallace's paralysis, leaving him using a wheelchair for the rest of his life. "I've said all along, if they wanted to do something like this, they do it under these circumstances," Grammer said, weeping, after the incident.

Grammer delivered the invocation for the Grand Ole Opry House opening on March 16, 1974. In 1990, he was inducted into the Illinois Country Music Hall of Fame, along with Tex Williams, Lulu Belle and Scotty, and Patsy Montana.

Grammer suffered from the degenerative eye disease retinitis pigmentosa and became completely blind. On February 27, 2009, he was honored by the Grand Ole Opry for his 50-year membership.

=== Death ===
Grammer died on August 10, 2011, aged 85, at Benton Hospital, where he had been receiving treatment for a long-term illness, which included suffering a heart attack seven months earlier.

== Singles ==
Year	Single	Chart Positions			
Year	Single	US Country	US	US R&B	CAN
1959	"Gotta Travel On"	5	4	14	2
1959	"The Kissing Tree"	—	60	—	—
1959	"Bonaparte's Retreat"	—	50	—	—
1963	"I Wanna Go Home"	18	—	—	—
1964	"I'll Leave the Porch Light A-Burning"	43	—	—	—
1966	"Bottles"	35	—	—	—
1966	"The Real Thing"	30	—	—	—
1967	"Mabel (You Have Been a Friend to Me)"	48	—	—	14
1968	"The Ballad of John Dillinger"	70	—	—	—
1969	"Jesus Is a Soul Man"	66	—	—	5
