= Funny Familiar Forgotten Feelings (album) =

Studio album by Tom Jones
- Released: 1967
- Label: Parrot

Tom Jones chronology
Green, Green Grass of Home (1967)	Funny Familiar Forgotten Feelings (1967)	13 Smash Hits (1967)

Professional ratings
Review scores
Source	Rating
Billboard	"Pop spotlight" pick

Funny Familiar Forgotten Feelings is an album by Welsh singer Tom Jones released in 1967 in the United States and Canada by Parrot Records. It was an abridged version of the UK album Green, Green Grass of Home on Decca.

== Track listing ==
Side one

1. "Funny Familiar Forgotten Feelings" (Newbury) — 2:52
2. "Riders in the Sky" (Jones) — 3:10
3. "He'll Have to Go" (A. Allison, J. Allison) — 3:20
4. "Sixteen Tons" (Travis) — 3:05
5. "Two Brothers" (Gordon) — 3:18
6. "All I Get from You Are Heartaches" (Frisch, Neiburg) — 2:48

Side two

1. "Detroit City" (Dill, Tillis) — 3:30
2. "Ring of Fire" (Carter, Kilgore) — 2:40
3. "A Field of Yellow Daisies" (Rich) — 3:22
4. "Cool Water" (Nolan) — 4:10
5. "(I Wish I Could) Say No to You" (Newbury) — 2:41
6. "Mohair Sam" (Frazier) — 2:22
