= Roma Wilkinson =

American songwriter (1918–2013)

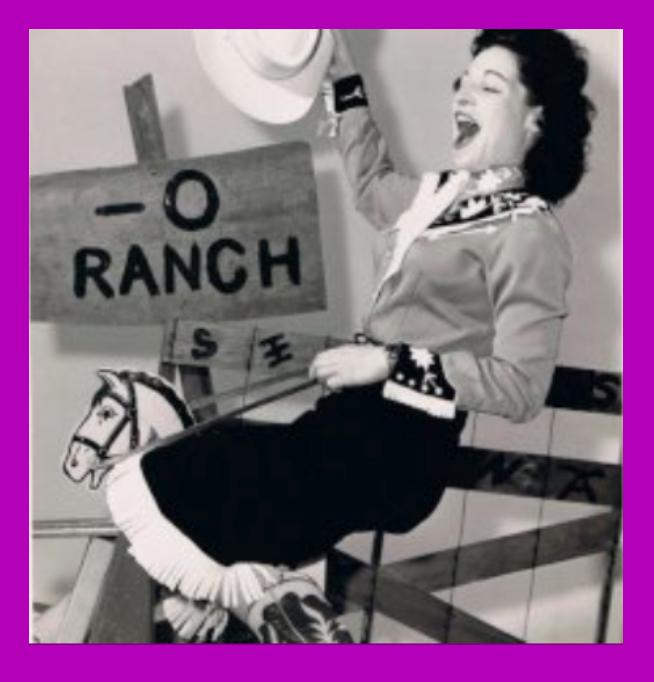

Ruth Oma Mackintosh Wilkinson (née Wagaman, September 27, 1918 – February 12, 2013), better known as Roma Wilkinson, was an American songwriter whose compositions were performed by such singers as Bing Crosby and the Andrews Sisters.

== Biography ==
Ruth Oma Wagaman was born in Kansas City, Missouri on September 27, 1918, the fourth of nine children. Her mother ran a general store and encouraged Roma’s creative streak by offering customized poems and cards for her customers, which Roma would write.

Wilkinson started writing songs when she was very young. The Gods Were Angry With Me, a song she wrote at the age of 16, later became a hit for country singer Jim Reeves, who included it on several of his albums. Several of her songs were recorded by other people, including Bing Crosby and Peggy Lee. Always a lyricist, she often partnered with musician Watt Watkins to create their music. Wilkinson also wrote music, and submitted some demos with her own melodies. Wilkinson died in Rancho Cordova, California on February 12, 2013, at the age of 94.
