= (Margie's At) The Lincoln Park Inn =

Single by Bobby Bare

from the album (Margie's At) The Lincoln Park Inn and Other Controversial Country Songs
- B-side: "Rainy Day in Richmond"
- Released: March 1969
- Recorded: 1968
- Genre: Country
- Length: 3:21
- Label: RCA Nashville
- Songwriter(s): Tom T. Hall

Bobby Bare singles chronology
"Town That Broke My Heart" (1968)	"(Margie's At) The Lincoln Park Inn" (1969)	"Which One Will It Be" (1969)

"(Margie's At) The Lincoln Park Inn" is a song made famous by country music singer Bobby Bare. Written by Tom T. Hall, the song became a major hit for Bare in the spring of 1969, peaking at No. 4 on Billboard magazine's Hot Country Singles chart.

== Song plot ==
The song is told first-person style through the eyes of a family man, who describes everyday domestic life in the verses of his song. However, this is all background, as the main subject of the song is about his recent adulterous relationship with a woman named Margie. The two, as the song's title implies, had a sexual liaison at a motel called the Lincoln Park Inn.

The protagonist regrets his affair, and states that he has made a promise not to cheat anymore. However, he still harbors deep temptation for Margie ("I know why she's there/I've been there before"), and — still having her telephone number — knows full well that she is often a client at the inn and is probably there as he speaks.

At the end of the song it is implied he will go to meet her.

== Chart performance ==
Chart (1969)	Peak position
U.S. Billboard Hot Country Singles	4
Canadian RPM Country Tracks	7

== Cover versions ==
In addition to Bare and Hall, "The Lincoln Park Inn" (as the song is sometimes known) has also been recorded by country performers Johnny Darrell, Johnny Duncan, Jimmy C. Newman, Ray Price, The Statler Brothers, Cal Smith, Mel Tillis, and Jack White.
