= Cowboys and Daddys =

Studio album by Bobby Bare
- Released: 1975
- Genre: Country, outlaw country
- Label: RCA Victor

Bobby Bare chronology
| The Very Best of Bobby Bare (1975) | Cowboys and Daddys (1975) | Sunday Mornin' Comin' Down (1975) |

Cowboys and Daddys is an album by the American musician Bobby Bare, released in 1975. It peaked at No. 21 on Billboard's Top Country Albums chart.

== Production ==
In his liner notes, Bare acknowledged that by the mid-1970s being a cowboy was more about "an attitude than an occupation." "Chester" and "The Stranger" were written by Shel Silverstein. The former is about an ex-rodeo rider who has to adapt to a life of constant pain; the latter is about a man who falls in love with a cow. The title track is a narrative about divorce. "The Cowboy and the Poet (Faster Horses)", about the ideology of a graying cowboy, is a cover of the Tom T. Hall song. "Amarillo Highway" and "High Plains Jamboree" were written by Terry Allen.

== Critical reception ==
Professional ratings
Review scores
| Source | Rating |
|---|---|
| All Music Guide to Country | 5/5 stars |
| Robert Christgau | A− |
| The Encyclopedia of Popular Music | 3/5 stars |
| The New Rolling Stone Album Guide | 2/5 stars |

The Philadelphia Daily News noted that "while the 'hip country' people get all the ink, Bare keeps churning out one fine record after another." The Journal Herald said that Bare has "extreme depth of feeling for the subject." The Austin American-Statesman considered Bare's cover of Ray Wylie Hubbard's "Up Against the Wall Redneck Mother" to be the "official song of the Austin music scene".

The News and Observer praised Bare's "sleepy, hangover voice" and "easy manner". The Deseret News included Cowboys and Daddys in its column on the important releases of 1975. The Houston Post admired the "wonderful details and memorable imagery." Robert Christgau concluded that the album "does as much for the outlaw ethos as Waylon and Willie put together."

== Track listing ==
Side A

1. "The Cowboy and the Poet (Faster Horses)"
2. "Cowboys and Daddys"
3. "High Plains Jamboree"
4. "Chester"
5. "Up Against the Wall Redneck Mother"
6. "The Stranger"

Side B

1. "Amarillo Highway"
2. "Speckled Pony"
3. "Pretty Painted Ladies"
4. "He's a Cowboy"
5. "Calgary Snow"
6. "Last Dance at the Old Texas Moon"
