= Arthur Alexander =

American country-soul songwriter and singer (1940–1993)

- Arthur Alexander in 1993, one of the last photos taken before his death

Background information
- Born: Arthur Alexander; May 10, 1940; Sheffield, Alabama, U.S.
- Died: June 9, 1993 (aged 53) Nashville, Tennessee, U.S.
- Genres: Country; soul
- Occupations: Singer; songwriter
- Years active: 1960–1993
- Labels: Judd; Dot; Buddah; Warner Bros.; Ace; Elektra; Sound Stage 7; Omnivore Recordings

Arthur Alexander (May 10, 1940 – June 9, 1993) was an American country-soul singer and songwriter. Jason Ankeny, music critic for AllMusic, said Alexander was a "country-soul pioneer" and that, though largely unknown, "his music is the stuff of genius, a poignant and deeply intimate body of work on par with the best of his contemporaries." Alexander's songs were covered by such stars as the Beatles, the Rolling Stones, Bob Dylan, Gerry and the Pacemakers, Otis Redding, Tina Turner, Pearl Jam, Rick Nelson and Jerry Lee Lewis.

== Life ==
Alexander was born in Sheffield, Alabama, United States. Working with Spar Music in Florence, Alabama, Alexander recorded his first single, "Sally Sue Brown", under the name of June Alexander (short for Junior), which was released in 1960 on Jud Phillips' Judd Records. (Phillips is the brother of music pioneer Sam Phillips).

A year later, Alexander cut "You Better Move On", at the fledgling FAME Studios, which at that point was located above the City Drug Store in Florence, Alabama. (The studio would shortly move to its more famous location in nearby Muscle Shoals, Alabama.) Released on Nashville's Dot Records, the song became a soul/R&B chart hit, and laid the foundation for the modern recording studio FAME. "You Better Move On" is perhaps Alexander's best-known song, covered by the Rolling Stones, the Hollies, George Jones & Johnny Paycheck, Gene Clark (from the Byrds) and Mink DeVille. "Anna (Go to Him)", a U.S. R&B Top Ten Hit, was covered by the Beatles, Roger McGuinn (from the Byrds) and Humble Pie. The Beatles did live recordings of "Soldier of Love" (also performed by Marshall Crenshaw and Pearl Jam), "A Shot of Rhythm and Blues", and "Where Have You Been" at the Star-Club in Hamburg in 1962.

In 1962, Steve Alaimo was the first to record Alexander's "Every Day I Have to Cry", which reached No.46 on the U.S. Billboard Hot 100 chart. Dusty Springfield also recorded the song for her first UK solo EP, "I Only Want to Be With You", released in 1964.

In the mid-1960s, Alexander switched to another label, Sound Stage 7, but failed to find commercial success. Although a 1972 album for Warner Brothers was promising, the singer's potential seemed to wither. He secured a pop hit with "Every Day I Have to Cry Some" on Buddah Records in 1975, but the success remained short-lived. The song was also covered by Ike and Tina Turner (produced by Phil Spector), the McCoys, Dusty Springfield, Joe Stampley, C.J. Chenier, Jerry Lee Lewis, the Gentrys and others. The follow-up single "Sharing The Night Together" (written by Muscle Shoals songwriters Ava Aldridge and Eddie Struzick) reached No. 92 on the R&B charts, but earned Dr. Hook & the Medicine Show a Top 10 hit in 1978; the Dr. Hook version was used in the 2012 Family Guy episode "Mr. and Mrs. Stewie".

That same year, he first recorded "Burning Love", which would be covered by Elvis Presley.

For many years, Alexander was out of the music business; he was a bus driver for much of this time. In 1990, he was inducted into the Alabama Music Hall of Fame. He began to perform again in 1993 as renewed interest was shown in his back catalogue. His last album, Lonely Just Like Me, was his first in 21 years.

He signed a new recording/publishing contract in May 1993 but suffered a fatal heart attack on June 9, 1993, in Nashville, three days after performing there with his new band. He is buried in Florence City Cemetery in Florence, Alabama.

== Legacy ==
Alexander is the only songwriter whose songs have been covered on studio albums by the Beatles, the Rolling Stones and Bob Dylan (who recorded "Sally Sue Brown" on his 1988 LP Down in the Groove). In 1987, Paul McCartney claimed that "If the Beatles wanted a sound, it was R&B. That's what we used to listen to and what we wanted to be like. Black, that was basically it. Arthur Alexander."

== Discography ==
(U.S. issues except where noted)

=== Studio albums ===
- You Better Move On, Dot & London (UK) (1962)
- Arthur Alexander, Warner Brothers (1972)
- Lonely Just Like Me, Nonesuch/Elektra (1993)

==== Album reissues ====
- Story of Rock 'N' Roll (LP) (1977), Ariola (Germany) (reissue of You Better Move On)
- Arthur Alexander (LP) (1989), Ace (UK)
- You Better Move On (CD) (1993), MCA (UK) (reissue of LP with 8 bonus tracks)
- You Better Move On (CD) (2014), Hoodoo Records (EU) (reissue of LP with 14 bonus tracks)
- Rainbow Road: The Warner Bros. Recordings (CD) (1994), Warner Archives (reissue of self-titled Warner LP above with bonus tracks)
- Lonely Just Like Me: The Final Chapter (CD) (2007), Hacktone (reissue of CD with bonus tracks)
- Arthur Alexander: Expanded Edition (CD) (2017), Omnivore

=== Compilation albums ===
- A Shot of Rhythm and Soul (1982), Ace (UK)
- Soldier of Love (1987), Ace (UK)
- The Greatest (1989 & 2006), Ace (UK)
- The Ultimate Arthur Alexander (1993), Razor & Tie
- The Monument Years (2001), Ace (UK)

=== EPs ===
- Arthur Alexander, Dot 655 (Sweden) (1962) (Note: Track list: "You Better Move On", "Lover Please", "Hey! Baby!", "The Wanderer")
- Alexander the Great!, London 1364 (UK) (1963) (Note: Track list: "You Better Move On", "Where Have You Been", "Anna", "Go Home Girl")
- Arthur Alexander, London 1401 (UK) (1963) (Note: Track list: "Soldiers of Love", "I Hang My Head and Cry", "You're the Reason", "Funny How Time Slips Away")
- A Shot of Rhythm and Blues, El Toro 15.086 (Spain) (2017) (Note: Track list: "A Shot of Rhythm and Blues", "Lover Please", "Sally Sue Brown", "The Girl That Radiates That Charm", "You're the Reason")

=== Singles ===
Year	Song	Peak chart positions						Label	Album
Year	Song	US Hot 100	Cashbox Top 100	Billboard R&B	Cashbox R&B 50	Record World	Canada (Note: CHUM chart 1963-1964. RPM chart 1965 and later.)	Label	Album
1960	"Sally Sue Brown" (Alexander-Stafford-Montgomery) (Note: Released as June Alexander.) b/w "The Girl That Radiates That Charm" (Ron Isle-Jimmy Isle)	—	—	—	—	—	—	Judd 1020	— (Note: Re-recorded version included on the 1993 Lonely Just Like Me album.) — (Note: Also released on a 2014 UK split single, Outta Sight RSV 045)
1962	"You Better Move On" (Alexander) b/w "A Shot of Rhythm and Blues" (Thompson)	24	17	27	13	19	—	Dot 16309	You Better Move On (Note: LP version is ten seconds shorter than single version. Single version included as a bonus track on 1993 CD reissue.) — (Note: Included as a bonus track on You Better Move On 1993 CD reissue.)
1962	"Where Have You Been (All My Life)" (Mann-Weil) b/w "Soldier of Love (Lay Down Your Arms)" (Cason-Moon)	58	97	—	17	73	—	Dot 16357	— —
1962	"Anna (Go to Him)" (Alexander) b/w "I Hang My Head and Cry" (Autry-Rose-Whitley)	68	67	10	20	72	—	Dot 16387	— —
1963	"Go Home Girl" (Alexander) b/w "You're the Reason" (Edwards-Imes-Fell-Henley)	102	120	—	—	124	—	Dot 16425	— (Note: Re-recorded versions included on the 1972 Arthur Alexander and the 1993 Lonely Just Like Me albums.); You Better Move On
1963	"I Wonder Where You Are Tonight" (Johnny Bond) b/w "Dream Girl" (Jerry Crutchfield-Jan Crutchfield)	— (Note: Listed in "Four Star Singles" March 23 and in "Page One Singles" April 6 and April 13.)	— (Note: Listed in "Best Bets" section March 30.)	—	—	—	—	Dot 16454	— —
1963	"Pretty Girls Everywhere" (E. Church-T. Williams) b/w "Baby, Baby" (Joy Byers)	118	— (Note: Listed in "Best Bets" section August 3.)	—	—	130	—	Dot 16509 (Note: Also released on a 2003 German split single, Hip City Soul Club HCS CR-1)	— —
1963	"Where Did Sally Go" (Herb Ryals) b/w "Keep Her Guessin'" (Herb Ryals)	—	—	—	—	—	—	Dot 16554	— —
1964	"Black Night" (J.M. Robinson) b/w "Old John Amos" (Alexander)	—	—	—	—	—	—	Dot 16616	— —
1965	"You Better Move On" (Alexander) b/w "Anna (Go To Him)" (Alexander)	—	—	—	—	—	—	Dot 126 (Note: Reissue.)	You Better Move On —
1965	"Detroit City" (M. Tillis-D. Dill) b/w "You Don't Care" (J. Willis-H. Ryals)	—	—	—	—	—	—	Dot 16737	— —
1966	"(Baby) For You" (Elizabeth A. Barton) b/w "The Other Woman (In My Life)" (Don Rollins)	—	—	—	—	—	—	Sound Stage 7 2556	— —
1966	"Show Me the Road" (Ward-Alexander) b/w "Turn Around (and Try Me)" (Ward-Alexander-Thurman)	—	—	—	—	—	—	Sound Stage 7 2572	— —
1968	"I Need You Baby" (Alexander-Ward) b/w "Spanish Harlem'" (Leiber, Stoller, Spector)	—	—	—	—	—	—	Monument 1060	— —
1968	"Set Me Free" (Curly Putman) b/w "Love's Where Life Begins" (Alexander-Ward)	—	—	—	—	—	—	Sound Stage 7 2619	— —
1970	"Cry Like a Baby" (Dan Penn, Spooner Oldham) b/w "Glory Road'" (Neil Diamond)	—	—	—	—	—	—	Sound Stage 7 2652	— —
1972	"I'm Comin' Home" (Dennis Linde) b/w "It Hurts To Want It So Bad'" (Tim Smith, Steve Smith, Charles Veldman)	—	—	—	—	—	—	Warner Bros. 7571	— —
1972	"Mr. John" (Alexander-Cain) b/w "You Got Me Knockin'" (Alexander-Cain-Williams-Hostak)	—	—	—	—	—	—	Warner Bros. 7633	— (Note: Included as a bonus track on the 2017 reissue of Arthur Alexander.) —
1972	"Burning Love" (Dennis Linde) b/w "It Hurts To Want It So Bad'" (Tim Smith, Steve Smith, Charles Veldman)	—	—	—	—	—	—	Warner Bros. 7658	— —
1973	"Lover Please" (Billy Swan) b/w "They'll Do It Every Time'" (Alexander-Cain)	—	—	—	—	—	—	Warner Bros. 7676	— (Note: Included as a bonus track on the 1989 and 2017 reissues of Arthur Alexander.) —
1975	"Every Day I Have to Cry Some" (Alexander) b/w "Everybody Needs Somebody to Love'" (A. Cartee-G. Soulé)	45	51	—	—	58	87	Buddah 492	— —
1976	"Sharing the Night Together" (Ava Aldridge, Eddie Struzick) b/w "She'll Throw Stones at You" (Al Cartee, George Soulé, Vic Dana)	—	94	92	—	108	—	Buddah 522 (Note: Reissued in 1978 as Buddah 602 after the chart success of Dr. Hook's version.)	— —
1977	"Hound Dog Man's Gone Home" (Max Lee, Albert S. Lowe, Jr.) b/w "So Long Baby'" (Alexander-Aldridge)	—	—	—	—	—	—	Music Mill 1012	— —
2014	"You Better Listen to Me'" (Bill Haney) (Note: Split single with Denise & Abe "Ain't That Lovin'".)	—	—	—	—	—	—	Ace NW 1 (Note: U.K. release.)	—
2021	"Stay by Me" (Alexander) b/w "Me My Mine'" (Shirl Milete)	—	—	—	—	—	—	Kent Select 074	—
Reissues	"Anna" / "You Better Move On"	—	—	—	—	—	—	Dottsie 123	—
Reissues	"You Better Move On" / "Anna (Go to Him)"	—	—	—	—	—	—	Collectables 3375	—
Reissues	"You Better Move On" / "Anna (Go to Him)"	—	—	—	—	—	—	Ripete 199	—

=== Compilation appearances ===
- Various Artists – Greatest Rhythm and Blues Stars (1965), Guest Star (two tracks by Alexander)
- Carl Perkins – Sing a Song with Me (1979), Koala (four demos by Alexander)
- Jon Tiven's Ego Trip – Blue Guru (1996), Fountainbleu (one over-dubbed demo by Alexander)
- Various Artists – Bill Haney's Atlanta Soul Brotherhood (1998), Kent (UK) (one track by Alexander)
- Various Artists – Bill Haney's Atlanta Soul Brotherhood Vol. 2 (1998), Kent (UK) (one track by Alexander)

=== Tribute albums ===
- Various Artists: Adios Amigo: A Tribute to Arthur Alexander (1994) Razor And Tie (17 tracks by artists including Elvis Costello, Roger McGuinn; Graham Parker; John Prine; Nick Lowe; Marshall Crenshaw and Zucchero.)
- Donnie Fritts: June – A Tribute to Arthur Alexander (2018)

Discography notes

== Songs written by Alexander ==
- "Sally Sue Brown" (co-writer), recorded 1960, covered by Bob Dylan, Elvis Costello
- "You Better Move On", recorded 1961, covered by the Hollies, the Rolling Stones, Tommy Roe, George Jones & Johnny Paycheck, Billy "Crash" Craddock, Mink DeVille
- "Anna (Go To Him)", recorded 1962, covered by the Beatles, Roger McGuinn, Humble Pie
- "Every Day I Have to Cry Some", written 1962, recorded 1975, produced by Phil Spector, covered by Ike and Tina Turner, Bee Gees, Johnny Rivers, Debby Boone, Bob Luman
- "Go Home Girl", recorded 1962, covered by the Rolling Stones, Ry Cooder, Gary U.S. Bonds, Frank Black
- "In the Middle of it All", recorded 1987

== See also ==
- Muscle Shoals Sound Studio
- Soul music
- Country music
