= 500 Miles =

1961 song by Hedy West

"500 Miles" (also known as "500 Miles Away from Home" or "Railroaders' Lament") is a song made popular in the United States and Western Europe during the 1960s folk revival. The simple repetitive lyrics offer a lament by a traveler who is far from home, out of money, and too ashamed to return. In a May 1963 interview on Folk Music Worldwide, Paul Stookey of Peter, Paul and Mary characterized the song, which appeared on the group's 1962 debut album, as "a reflection of loneliness."

== History ==
The song is generally credited as being written by Hedy West, and a 1961 copyright is held by Atzal Music, Inc. "500 Miles" is West's "most anthologized song". Some recordings have also credited Curly Williams, or John Phillips as co-writers, although Phillips said he had only rearranged it and "didn't deserve the credit". David Neale writes that "500 Miles" may be related to the older folk song "900 Miles" (Roud 4959), which may itself have origins in the Southern American fiddle tunes "Reuben's Train" and "Train 45". Johnny Cash is known to have included "500 Miles" on his list of 100 essential country songs in the early 1970s.

Folklorist Norm Cohen writes that a distance of 900 miles, rather than 500, is most commonly referenced in versions of the traditional song, but other distances, including 400 miles and 10,000 miles also appear.

The melody of "500 Miles" is very close to that of “You’ll Never Miss Your Mother Till She’s Gone", written by Harry Birch, an alias of Charles A. White, and published by White, Smith, and Company of Boston, Massachusetts in 1885. Both "You'll Never Miss Your Mother Till She's Gone" and "900 Miles" were first recorded by Fiddlin' John Carson in 1923-4.

== Bobby Bare version ==
"500 Miles Away From Home"

Single by Bobby Bare

from the album 500 Miles Away From Home
- B-side: "It All Depends on Linda"
- Released: September 1963
- Genre: Countrypolitan
- Label: RCA Victor
- Songwriter: Hedy West
- Producer: Chet Atkins

Bobby Bare singles chronology
"Detroit City" (1963)	"500 Miles Away From Home" (1963)	"Miller's Cave" (1964)

The most commercially successful version of the song was Bobby Bare's in 1963. His version became a top-10 hit on the U.S. Billboard Hot 100, as well as a top-five hit on both the Country and Adult Contemporary charts.

== Chart history ==
=== Weekly charts ===
Chart (1963)	Peak position
Canada CHUM Chart	7
US Billboard Hot 100	10
US Billboard Adult Contemporary	4
US Billboard Country	5
US Cash Box Top 100	15

=== Year-end charts ===
Chart (1963)	Rank
US Billboard Hot 100	100

== Other cover versions ==
- The song appears on the 1961 eponymous debut album by The Journeymen; this may have been its first release.
- The song was heard on the February 1962 Kingston Trio live album College Concert (a 1962 US number three).
- It was further popularized by Peter, Paul and Mary, who included the song on their debut album in May 1962.
- It appears as "Nine Hundred Miles“ on the 1962 album When I Was a Young Girl from folk-singer Barbara Dane (released in October 1962).
- American country music singer Bobby Bare recorded a version with new lyrics, which became a hit single in 1963.
- Dick and Dee Dee released a version of the song on their 1964 album, Turn Around.
- The song was covered by Sonny & Cher on their 1965 album Look at Us. This version was played over the credits of the 1966 BBC TV film Cathy Come Home.
- The lyrics feature heavily in the Bob Dylan song "I Was Young When I Left Home".
- Bluegrass versions were recorded by The Country Gentlemen on their album 25 Years and The Seldom Scene on their album Act I.
- The Hooters recorded a version of this song with additional lyrics, dedicated to the Tiananmen Square protests of 1989. Peter, Paul and Mary provided background vocals for them, as well. This version is on the album Zig Zag.
- It has also been recorded by Terry Callier (as ″900 Miles″ on The New Folk Sound of Terry Callier), Lonnie Donegan, The Brothers Four, Glen Campbell, Johnny Rivers, Reba McEntire, Jackie DeShannon, The Seekers, Elvis Presley, Peter and Gordon, Eric Bibb, Hootenanny Singers, Joan Baez, Takako Matsu, The Persuasions, Slater Rhea, Bad Astronaut, and many others.
- The song was performed by Justin Timberlake, Carey Mulligan, and Stark Sands for the soundtrack of the film Inside Llewyn Davis.
- Rosanne Cash covered the song on her 2009 album The List.
- In 2012, the song was recorded by American bluegrass band, The Special Consensus for their album Scratch Gravel Road.
- Niger's pioneer of electronic music Mamman Sani recorded an instrumental version, which is included in the compilation album Unreleased Tapes 1981-1984.
- The song's tune with a few slight lyric changes has been incorporated into the reggae song "Roach Killer" by Super Chick.
- The song is also covered by Clint Eastwood & General Saint in their hit song "Stop That Train", although the covered part is not to be heard until halfway into the song.
- Being a well-documented song publicised by English Folk Dance and Song Society, and Mainly Norfolk, the song was recorded by Jon Boden and Oli Steadman for inclusion in their respective lists of daily folk songs "A Folk Song a Day" and "365 Days Of Folk".

== In other languages ==
=== Albanian ===
Ilirët sang the song in Albanian.

=== Assamese ===
Jayanta Hazarika sang in Assamese "Ketiyaba Bejarote" (English: :Sometimes When in Grief") in 1962. Again, in 2018, Zubeen Garg sang "Kot Mur Maa" (English: Where’s My Mom) for a drama of Aawahan Mobile Theatre group.

=== Bengali ===
Bengali singer Anjan Dutt sung the song in Bengali called "Mr. Hall" in his 1997 album Keu Gaan Gaye.

=== Chinese ===
In 2017, a Chinese adaptation of the song called "别送我" (English: "Don't Send Me Off") was released on the soundtrack of Duckweed and sung by Chen Hongyu, Su Zixu, Liu Hao Lin, and Han Luo.

=== Czech ===
A Czech version was recorded in 1967 as "Tisíc mil" (English: "Thousand Miles") with the lyrics by Ivo Fischer, sung as a duet by Waldemar Matuška and Helena Vondráčková. and other version 500 mil performed by Rangers-Plavci

=== Finnish ===
In Finnish, the song has been recorded under at least five different scores, by Jukka Raitanen. This time, it was called "Liian kaukana" (English: "Too Far Away"). Lyrics were written by Raul Reiman. This song was released on Raitanen's album Yölinjalla. "Yölinjalla(in)" song is a Finnish version of the song "I Walk the Line" by Johnny Cash.

Moreover, "500 Miles" has also been released with religious content under the name "Lapsuuden usko" (English: "Childhood Faith"), with lyrics by Matti Nyberg. This version has been recorded at least three times in 1973, 2005, and 2011. It was released by a parish singer group Dominicones in 1973. In 2005 it was recorded by actor and singer Mikko Leppilampi. The song was released on album Tilkkutäkki (English: Quilt, by various artists), and targeted to people who want to remember the time of their confirmation on Lutheran church. In 2011, it was recorded by Petrus (real name Petri Kokko, born 1970) in his album Enkelten laulut (English: The Songs of Angels).

=== French ===
The song was adapted by lyricist Jacques Plante under the title Et j'entends siffler le train (English: "I Hear the Train Whistling"). It was sung by Richard Anthony, who had a hit with it. His recording reached number one in France in 1962. According to Richard Anthony, the song struck a chord with young French soldiers who were leaving for the Algerian War.

Hugues Aufray also sang it, but his version was not as successful. Anthony's version was covered by Franco Battiato on his 1999 album Fleurs. In 2011, Hugues Aufray rerecorded the song in a duet with Françoise Hardy on his album Troubadour since 1948.

=== German ===
In 1963 a German version, "Und dein Zug fährt durch die Nacht" (English: "And Your Train Goes Through the Night"), was a success for Peter Beil. Also in German, Santiano in 2012 released a marine-themed version, "500 Meilen", on their album Bis ans Ende der Welt.

=== Hebrew ===
A Hebrew version by Aviva Marks is called, "500 מייל" in 1966. The meaning of the name is "500 Miles", and it came part of her album Sweeter than Wine ("מתוק מיין"). The song is mostly translation to Hebrew.

=== Hindi ===
Indian composer Rajesh Roshan used the tune to compose "Jab Koyi Baat Bigad Jaaye" (English: "When Things Go Wrong") in 1990's movie Jurm.

=== Indonesian ===
The tune of this song has been used in religious contents in Indonesia. In the widely popular book of songs and praise for Catholics Madah Bakti, 500 Miles is adapted into Indonesian as “Ya Tuhan Kami Datang” (English: O Lord, We Come) and is included in the hymnal as hymn number 366. It is widely used in Roman Catholic liturgy in Indonesia, particularly in penitential or reflective contexts. In the hymn, the lyrics reflects key elements of Catholic spirituality, particularly the understanding of repentance as a communal and relational act. By acknowledging sin in both vertical (toward God) and horizontal (toward others) dimensions, the hymn underscores reconciliation as an essential preparation for participation in the Eucharistic celebration. However, they hymnal does not provide any context explaining the origin of the melody. Like other hymns translated into Indonesian, this may be because the song was originally secular and later turned into a hymn or song of praise.

=== Japanese ===
The Japanese duo Wink included it as the B side of their 1989 single 淋しい熱帯魚 (Samishii Nettaigyo), under the title 背中 まで 500 マイル (Senaka Made 500 Mairu; 500 Miles Back). In 1991, Kiyoshiro_Imawano sang 500 マイル (500 Mairu) on the debut album titled 日本の人 (Nippon No Hito; People of Japan) of HIS (unit with Haruomi Hosono and Fuyumi Sakamoto) In 2018, Japanese singer Kiyoe Yoshioka sang a Japanese version of the song, "500 Mairu" (500マイル) on her debut album Uta Iro.

=== Slovenian ===
Slovene singer Lado Leskovar wrote a 1965 hit based on the song titled "Poslednji vlak" (English: "The Last Train").

=== Spanish ===
Costa Rican rock band Los Rufos recorded a Spanish version under the title "500 Millas" in 1967. A similar version was recorded by the Nicaraguan band Los Rockets.

=== Vietnamese ===
Two versions in Vietnamese have been recorded. One is "Tiễn em lần cuối" ("Send You Off for the Last Time") sung by Trung Hanh; another one is "Người tình ngàn dặm" ("Thousand-mile-away Lover") sung by Ngọc Lan.

== In media ==
Peter, Paul & Mary's version of the song was used in:

- Rocky Mountain Express: 2011 Canadian film, which chronicles the early history of the Canadian Pacific Railway while following restored steam locomotive Canadian Pacific 2816 along the route.
- Mr Inbetween: 2018-21 Australian TV series used it in season two, episode eight: "You'll See Me in Your Dreams".
- Professor T.: 2021 Crime Drama featuring Ben Miller used the version in season one, episode four: "Mother Love".
- In the 2022 film Bullet Train, a version of the song is used by Song For Memories.
- Episode four in season two of the BBC Drama The Responder ends with The Journeymen version of the song.

== See also ==
- American fiddle
- List of train songs
