= The All American Boy =

Song performed by Bobby Bare

"The All American Boy" is a 1958 talking blues song written by Orville Lunsford and sung by Bobby Bare, but credited by Fraternity Records to Bill Parsons, with songwriting credit to Bill Parsons and Orville Lunsford. The song was co-written by Ralph Edward Hogsten, who also performed bass on the recording. However, he was uncredited.

While Bare was in the army, Parsons lip synced the record on television.

== Chart performance ==
The song reached number 2 on the Billboard chart, kept from the number one spot by "Smoke Gets in Your Eyes" by the Platters. Overseas, "The All American Boy" went to number 22 on the UK Singles Chart. It made the top 10 in Australia.

== Cover versions ==
- The song was recorded in 1959 by country music artist Grandpa Jones. The song was released as a single on the Decca label (9-30823) and peaked at number 21 on the US country music charts.

== Popular culture ==
The song was inspired by the success and then conscription of Elvis Presley, and Jerry Lee Lewis. Thus, the Pop Chronicles music documentary used it as the theme song for its episodes focused on Presley. The song ends with the narrator getting drafted into the US Army. This song makes reference to the Chuck Berry song, "Johnny B. Goode", as well as the television show, American Bandstand.
