= Old Dogs (group) =

American country music supergroup (1998)

Background information
- Origin: Nashville, Tennessee, U.S.
- Genre: Country
- Years active: 1998
- Label: Atlantic Nashville
- Past members: Bobby Bare; Waylon Jennings; Jerry Reed; Mel Tillis

Professional ratings
Review scores
Source	Rating
Allmusic	4.5/5 stars

Old Dogs were an American country music supergroup composed of singers Waylon Jennings, Mel Tillis, Bobby Bare, and Jerry Reed. Signed in 1998 to Atlantic Records, Old Dogs recorded a self-titled studio album for the label that year. The album's content was written primarily by author, poet, and songwriter Shel Silverstein. Most of the group's songs were based on the realization of aging, after Bare told Silverstein that there were "no good songs about growing old." The album was recorded live in studio, so audience applause can be heard between the tracks. The two discs come in different cases, and has different album art for them. The album was also issued as a single disc. "Still Gonna Die" was released as a single from the project. The album was one of the last projects Silverstein completed in his lifetime; he died in May 1999, five months after the album was released.

== Old Dogs (1998) ==
Old Dogs

Studio album by Old Dogs
- Released: December 1, 1998
- Genre: Country
- Length: 64:41 (dual-disc version)
- Label: Atlantic
- Producers: Bobby Bare, Brien Fisher

=== Track listing ===
All songs written by Shel Silverstein; "She'd Rather Be Homeless", co-written by Anne Dailey.

==== Disc 1 ====
1. "Old Dogs" – 2:21
2. "Come Back When You're Younger" – 3:35
3. "I Don't Do It No More" – 3:41
4. "She'd Rather Be Homeless" – 3:59
5. "Cut the Mustard" – 3:25
6. "Young Man's Job" – 3:08
7. "When I Was" – 2:07
8. "Couch Potato" – 3:44
9. "Hard When It Ain't" – 2:41
10. "Jittabug" – 2:58
11. "Me and Jimmie Rodgers" – 4:56

==== Disc 2 ====
1. "Elvis Has Left the Building" – 2:55
2. "Wait Until Tomorrow" – 3:16
3. "I Never Expected" – 3:23
4. "Ever Lovin' Machine" – 3:12
5. "Slap My Face" – 2:30
6. "Old Man Blues" – 3:45
7. "Rough on the Livin'" – 2:53
8. "Alimony" – 3:33
9. "Still Gonna Die" – 3:45
10. "Time" – 3:34

=== Single-disc version ===
1. "Old Dogs"
2. "I Don't Do It No More"
3. "She'd Rather Be Homeless"
4. "Cut the Mustard"
5. "Young Man's Job"
6. "Me and Jimmie Rodgers"
7. "Elvis Has Left the Building"
8. "Rough on the Livin'"
9. "Still Gonna Die"
10. "I Never Expected"
11. "Time"

=== Credits ===
- Waylon Jennings – Vocals
- Mel Tillis – Vocals
- Bobby Bare – Vocals
- Jerry Reed – Vocals, Guitar
- Pete Wade – Electric guitar
- Thom Bresh – Guitar
- Mike Leech – Bass
- Fred Newell – Guitar, Steel guitar
- Bobby Emmons – Electronic keyboard
- Jamey Whiting – Keyboard
- Hargus "Pig" Robbins – Piano
- Jay Vern – Organ
- Eddy Anderson – Drums
- Michael Clarke – Drums
- Jonathan Yudkin – Fiddle
- Ron De La Vega – Cello
- David L. Schnaufer – Jew's Harp
- Gary Kubal – Percussion
- Robert Lovett – Bass, Dobro
- Jessi Colter – Backing vocals
- Shel Silverstein – Backing vocals
- Bobby Bare Jr. – Backing vocals

=== Chart performance ===
Chart (1998)	Peak Position
U.S. Billboard Top Country Albums	61

=== Singles ===
Year	Single
1999	"Still Gonna Die"
