= Detroit City (song) =

Song written by Danny Dill and Mel Tillis

"I Wanna Go Home"

Single by Billy Grammer
- B-side: "The Bottom of the Glass"
- Released: 1962
- Label: Decca
- Songwriters: Danny Dill and Mel Tillis

Billy Grammer singles chronology
"I'd Like to Know Why" (1961)	"I Wanna Go Home" (1962)	"I'll Leave The Porch Lights A-Burning" (1963)

"Detroit City"

Single by Bobby Bare

from the album "Detroit City" and Other Hits by Bobby Bare
- B-side: "Heart of Ice"
- Released: May 1963 (U.S.)
- Recorded: April 18, 1963; Nashville, Tennessee
- Genre: Countrypolitan
- Length: 2:47
- Label: RCA Victor
- Songwriters: Danny Dill and Mel Tillis
- Producer: Chet Atkins

Bobby Bare singles chronology
"Shame on Me" (1962)	"Detroit City" (1963)	"500 Miles Away from Home" (1963)

"Detroit City"

Single by Arthur Alexander
- A-side: "You Don't Care"
- Released: April 1965
- Genre: Soul
- Length: 2:40
- Label: Dot
- Songwriters: Danny Dill and Mel Tillis
- Producers: Noel Ball; Norman Petty

"Detroit City"

Single by Tom Jones

from the album Green, Green Grass of Home
- B-side: "If I Had You"
- Released: February 1967
- Label: Decca
- Songwriters: Danny Dill and Mel Tillis
- Producer: Peter Sullivan

Tom Jones singles chronology
"Green, Green Grass of Home" (1966)	"Detroit City" (1967)	"Funny Familiar Forgotten Feelings" (1967)

"Detroit City" is a song written by Danny Dill and Mel Tillis, made famous by Billy Grammer (as "I Wanna Go Home"), country music singer Bobby Bare, and Tom Jones. Bare's version was released in 1963 and was featured on his album "Detroit City" and Other Hits by Bobby Bare. The song — sometimes known as "I Wanna Go Home" (from the opening line to the refrain) — was Bare's first top-10 hit on the Billboard Hot Country Singles chart that summer, and became a country music standard.

== About the song ==
Prior to Bare's success with "Detroit City," country singer Billy Grammer released his version of the Danny Dill and Mel Tillis-penned song. His version was known as "I Wanna Go Home" and peaked at number 18 on the Billboard country charts in 1963.

The song is the working man's complaint, and "with its melody reminiscent of the 'Sloop John B', describes the alienation felt by many rural Southerners in the mid North," wrote country music historian Bill Malone. "Here, [Bare's] earnest and plaintive interpretation lends great believability to this mournful song." Bob Dylan describes the song as "...not so much the song of a dreamer, but the song of someone who is caught up in a fantasy of the way things used to be. But the listener knows that it just doesn't exist." Bare's version begins in the key of E, until after the repeat of the refrain, he makes a transition to the key of B for the second verse and refrain. He makes a transition back to the key of E as the song fades out. Bare's version also features a spoken recitation following half of the second verse, before singing the refrain before the song's fade.

The song's peak in popularity during the summer of 1963 came during a time when Tillis was still experiencing most of his success as a songwriter. He had previously written hits for Webb Pierce, Brenda Lee, Stonewall Jackson, and others, but this was one of his earliest major hits as a songwriter outside of those artists.

The song won Bobby Bare a Grammy for the Best Country and Western Recording at the 6th Annual Grammy Awards in 1963.

== Chart performance ==
Billy Grammer's "I Wanna Go Home" reached number 18 on the Billboard Hot Country Singles chart in early 1963. That summer, Bobby Bare's retitled version peaked at number six on the Billboard country chart (it spent total of 18 weeks on this chart) and number 16 on the Billboard Hot 100.

=== Billy Grammer ===
Chart (1963)	Peak position
U.S. Billboard Hot Country Singles	18

=== Bobby Bare ===
Chart (1963)	Peak position
Australian Kent Music Report	93
Danish Singles Chart	7
German Singles Chart	40
Norwegian Singles Chart	1
Sweden (Kvällstoppen)	1
Sweden (Tio i Topp)	1
U.S. Billboard Adult Contemporary	4
U.S. Billboard Hot Country Singles	6
U.S. Billboard Hot 100	16

=== Tom Jones ===
Chart (1967)	Peak position
U.K. Singles Chart	8
Austrian Top 40	14
U.S. Billboard Hot 100	27
German Singles Chart	35
Canadian Singles Chart	16

=== Dean Martin ===
Chart (1970)	Peak position
U.S. Billboard Bubbling Under-Hot 100	1
U.S. Billboard Adult Contemporary	36
Canadian RPM Top Singles	93

== Other notable versions ==
- Arthur Alexander released the song as a single in 1965 backed with "You Don't Care," but it did not perform well and proved to be his last single for Dot Records. Nonetheless, historian Nat Hentoff described Alexander's rendition as "deeply compelling," stating that it "[eclipsed] the original version by Bobby Bare." Alexander biographer described it as "a stirring rendition." Music USA: A Rough Guide also praised Alexander's version. No Depression magazine states that Alexander's version "mourns a rural-to-urban migration that black Americans could relate to every bit as much as poor Southern whites."
- In 1967, the song was also covered by Tom Jones, who had a UK Top 10 hit with it. The Jones version features Bare's spoken Recitation as well. Jones also included the song on his 1967 album Green, Green Grass of Home.
- Solomon Burke covered the song in 1967 as well for his album King Solomon. His version reached #10 in the Canadian RPM Soul charts on January 27, 1968.
