= Green, Green Grass of Home =

1965 song written by Curly Putman

- Side A of the original US single

Single by Johnny Darrell

from the album As Long as the Winds Blow
- B-side: "Deepening Snow"
- Released: May 1965
- Genre: Country
- Length: 2:35
- Label: United Artists
- Songwriter: Curly Putman
- Producer: Kelso Herston

Johnny Darrell singles chronology
"Green, Green Grass of Home" (1965)	"As Long as the Wind Blows" (1965)

"Green, Green Grass of Home"
- Side A variant of the original US single

Single by Porter Wagoner

from the album On the Road: The Porter Wagoner Show
- B-side: "Dooley"
- Released: July 1965
- Recorded: June 7, 1965
- Studio: RCA Studio B, Nashville
- Genre: Country
- Length: 2:20
- Label: RCA Victor
- Songwriter: Curly Putman
- Producer: Bob Ferguson

Porter Wagoner singles chronology
"I'm Gonna Feed You Now" (1965)	"Green, Green Grass of Home" (1965)	"Skid Row Joe" (1965)

"Green, Green Grass of Home", written by Claude "Curly" Putman Jr., and first recorded by American singer Johnny Darrell as his debut single in 1965, is a country song made popular by Porter Wagoner the same year, when it reached No. 4 on the Country chart. It was also recorded by Jerry Lee Lewis, who included it in his album Country Songs for City Folks (later re-issued as All Country). Welsh singer Tom Jones learned the song from Lewis's version and, in 1966, he had a No. 1 hit in several countries with it.

== Lyrical content ==
The narrator returns to his childhood home for what seems to be his first visit there since leaving in his youth. When he steps down from the train, his parents are there to greet him, and his sweetheart, Mary, comes running to join them. They meet him with "arms reaching, smiling sweetly". With Mary, the narrator strolls at ease among the monuments of his childhood, including "the old oak tree that I used to play on", feeling that "it's good to touch the green, green grass of home".

However, the narrator then awakens to see grey walls surrounding him and realizes that his return home was only a dream and that he is actually in prison. It is the day of his scheduled execution. He sees a guard and "a sad old padre" who will walk with him to his execution at daybreak, and then he will return home "in the shade of that old oak tree, as they lay me 'neath the green, green grass of home".

== Tom Jones version ==
"Green, Green Grass of Home"
- Side A variant of the original UK single

Single by Tom Jones

from the album Green, Green Grass of Home
- B-side: "Promise Her Anything"
- Released: October 28, 1966
- Genre: Country; soul
- Length: 3:05
- Label: Decca F22511
- Songwriter: Curly Putman
- Producer: Peter Sullivan

Tom Jones singles chronology
"This and That" (1966)	"Green, Green Grass of Home" (1966)	"Detroit City" (1967)

Welsh singer Tom Jones, who was appearing on The Ed Sullivan Show in 1965, visited Colony Records while staying in New York City. On asking if they had any new works by Jerry Lee Lewis, he was given the new country album.

Impressed with the song, Jones recorded and released the song in the UK in 1966 and it reached No. 1 on December 1, staying there for a total of seven weeks. The song also spent 7 weeks at No. 1 on the Irish Singles Chart. The song has sold over 1.25 million copies in the UK as of September 2017. Jones's version also reached No. 11 pop, No. 12 easy listening on the Billboard US charts.

In September 2006, Jones performed the song as a duet with Lewis during the taping of the latter's Last Man Standing TV special in New York City, and credited Lewis with providing the inspiration for his own recording.

=== Charts ===
Chart (1966–1967)	Peak position
Australia (Kent Music Report)	1
Austria (Ö3 Austria Top 40)	2
Belgium (Ultratop 50 Flanders)	1
Belgium (Ultratop 50 Wallonia)	14
Canada Adult Contemporary Singles (RPM)	10
Canada RPM Top 100	5
Ireland (IRMA)	1
Netherlands (Single Top 100)	2
New Zealand (Listener)	2
Norway (VG-lista)	1
UK Singles (Official Charts)	1
US Billboard Hot 100	11
US Adult Contemporary (Billboard)	12
West Germany (GfK)	6

=== Certifications ===
Region	Certification	Certified units/sales
New Zealand (RMNZ)	Gold	15,000^{‡}
United Kingdom (BPI)	Silver	1,257,737
^{‡} Sales+streaming figures based on certification alone.
