= Bobby Bare =

American country music singer (born 1935)

Bobby Bare Sr.
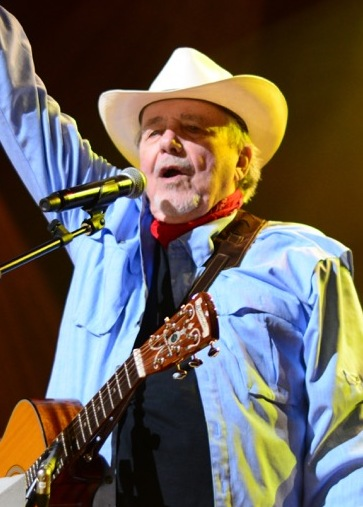
- Bare performing at the Grand Ole Opry in 2017

Background information
- Born: Robert Joseph Bare; April 7, 1935 (age 91); Ironton, Ohio, U.S.
- Genres: Country; progressive country
- Occupation: Singer-songwriter
- Instruments: Vocals, guitar
- Years active: 1956–present
- Labels: Capitol; RCA Victor; Mercury; Columbia; Plowboy
- Formerly of: Old Dogs
- Website: bobbybare.com

Robert Joseph Bare Sr. (born April 7, 1935) is an American country music singer and songwriter, best known for the songs "Marie Laveau", "Detroit City", and "500 Miles Away from Home". He is the father of Bobby Bare Jr., also a musician.

== Early career ==
Bare was born in Ironton, Ohio, on April 7, 1935. In the 1950s, he repeatedly tried and failed to sell his songs. He finally got a record deal, with Capitol Records, and recorded a few unsuccessful rock and roll singles. Just before he was drafted into the United States Army, he wrote a song called "The All American Boy" and did a demonstration tape (demo) for his friend, Bill Parsons, to learn how to record. Instead of using Parsons' later version, the record company, Fraternity Records, decided to go with Bare's original demo. The record reached number two on the Billboard Hot 100, but Fraternity erroneously credited Bill Parsons on the label. The same track, with the same billing error, peaked at number 22 in the UK Singles Chart in April 1959. In 1965, an album of older recorded material, Tender Years (JM-6026), was released on the Hilltop label. That same year, the material was repackaged by Sears and released under the title Bobby in Song (SPS-115).

== Career at RCA Victor (1962–1970) ==
Bare's big break in country music came when Chet Atkins signed him to RCA Victor. His debut single for the label was 1962's "Shame on Me". Follow-up "Detroit City" reached number six on the Country and number 16 on the Hot 100 charts, and in 1964 earned him a Grammy Award for Best Country & Western Recording. Then, a surge of hits followed, including "500 Miles Away from Home" (based on a traditional folk ballad written by Hedy West as "500 Miles") and Ian Tyson's "Four Strong Winds". In 1965, he received two further Grammy nominations for Best Country & Western Vocal Performance and Best Country & Western single for the latter song. In 1966, he received a yet another Grammy Nomination for Best Country & Western Male Vocal Performance for his song "Talk Me Some Sense". He also recorded two duet albums with Skeeter Davis and recorded six tracks as a trio with Norma Jean and Liz Anderson, which produced a major hit with "The Game of Triangles", a wife-husband-other woman drama that hit number five on the Billboard chart and earned the trio a Grammy nomination. In 1968, he recorded an album with a group from England called The Hillsiders. In 1969, he had a top-five hit with Tom T. Hall's "(Margie's At) The Lincoln Park Inn".

== Career at Mercury (1970–1972) ==
Bare moved to Mercury Records in 1970 and immediately scored a top-three hit with "How I Got to Memphis", and also had two top-10 hits with early Kris Kristofferson compositions, "Come Sundown" and "Please Don't Tell Me How the Story Ends" (both 1971). He also scored a number-12 hit in 1972 with a version of Dr. Hook and the Medicine Show's pop hit "Sylvia's Mother", written by Shel Silverstein.

== Return to RCA Victor (1973–1977) ==
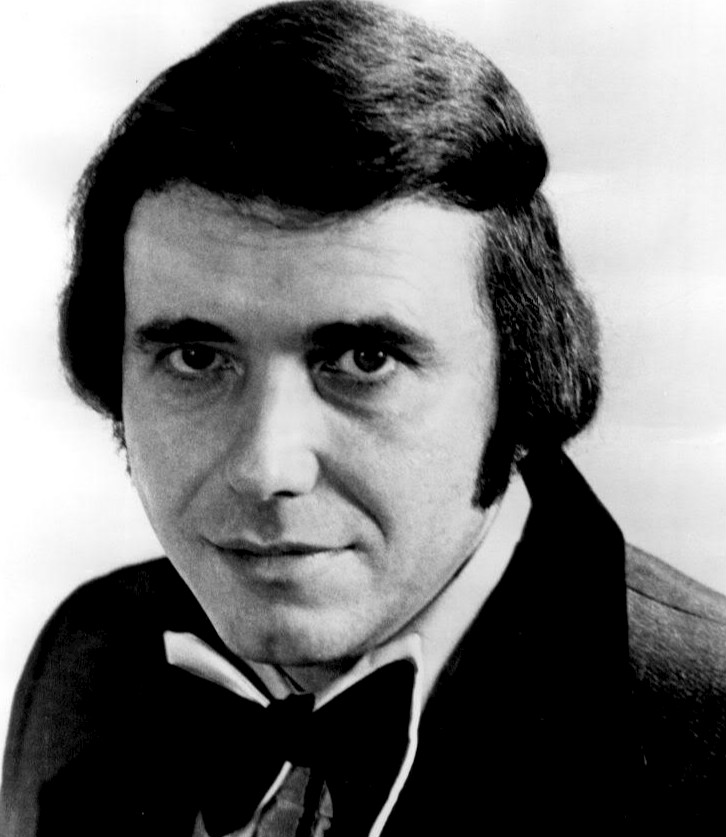
Bare in 1973

Bare returned to RCA in 1973, after two years at Mercury. and scored once more with Billy Joe Shaver's "Ride Me Down Easy", which nearly made the top 10. He started to release novelty songs recorded live with selected audiences. One such song, "Marie Laveau", topped the country chart in 1974; the song was Bare's only number-one hit. It was co-written by his friends Silverstein and Baxter Taylor, who received a BMI Award for the song in 1975. In 1977, Bare released an entire album of songs by songwriter Bob McDill called Me and McDill, which contained the popular hit "Look Who I'm Cheatin' on Tonight".

Silverstein penned other songs for Bare, including a Grammy-nominated hit, "Daddy What If", which he recorded with his five-year-old son, Bobby Bare Jr. The song was an immediate success, as well, not only reaching number two on the country charts, but nearly reaching the top 40 on the pop charts. Bare's album, Sings Lullabys, Legends and Lies, became his most commercially successful album, finding him a new audience, with pop radio once again playing his songs and also gaining a new following with college kids. These songs, all 14 written or co-written by Shel Silverstein, however, became Bare's last top-10 hits. In 1975, Bare recorded a children's album with his family, mainly of Silverstein songs, called Singin' in the Kitchen. It was nominated in Best Group category in Grammy Awards.

His biggest hits during this time included "Alimony" (1975), "The Winner" (1976), and "Drop Kick Me, Jesus (Through the Goalposts of Life)" (an unusual Christian-football waltz and a 1976 Grammy nominee for Best Country Song). In 1977, he recorded "Redneck Hippie Romance" and "Vegas" (a duet with his wife Jeannie).

== Career at Columbia (1978–1983) ==
Bare signed with Columbia Records and continued to have hits including "Sleep Tight Good Night Man", which barely cracked the top 10 in 1978, alongside continuing to score critical acclaim with his releases Bare and Sleeper Wherever I Fall. In 1979, he started off Rosanne Cash's career in a big way by being her duet partner on the top-20 hit "No Memories Hangin' Round". In 1980, he almost cracked the top 10 with "Numbers", which came from his album Down and Dirty. On that album, Bare started to experiment with Southern rock, which continued with his following album, Drunk and Crazy (1980). The next year, Bare returned to his country roots with his Rodney Crowell-produced album As Is, featuring the single "New Cut Road". Bare was still doing well chartwise into the early 1980s. In 1983, his duet with Lacy J. Dalton, "It's a Dirty Job", hit the top 30. His last foray into the top 30 came that summer with the novelty song "The Jogger". He also released "Used Cars", the theme song from the film of the same name.

== Film career ==
Bare was also given an opportunity to star in movies. He acted in a Western with Troy Donahue, A Distant Trumpet, and had a memorable scene being branded for desertion, and a few episodes of the TV series No Time for Sergeants. He turned his back on Hollywood to pursue his country music career.

== Later country career (1983–present) ==
From 1983 to 1988, Bare hosted Bobby Bare and Friends on The Nashville Network, which featured him interviewing songwriters who sang their hit songs on the show. In 1985, he signed with EMI America Records, where he scored three low-charting singles. In 1998, he formed the band Old Dogs, with Jerry Reed, Mel Tillis, and Waylon Jennings. As of 2023, he is the last surviving member of the group.

In 2005, he released his first new album in two decades, The Moon Was Blue, produced by his son Bobby Bare Jr., who is also a musician. He continues to tour today. In 2012, Bare performed a duet of the song "I'd Fight the World" on the Jamey Johnson album Living for a Song: A Tribute to Hank Cochran.

On April 10, 2013, the CMA announced that Bare would be a 2013 inductee into the Country Music Hall of Fame. Other 2013 inductees included Cowboy Jack Clement and Kenny Rogers.

After being inducted in the 1960s, but gradually drifting away, Bare was reinstated as a member of the Grand Ole Opry on April 7, 2018, by Garth Brooks.

== Eurovision 2012 ==
In January and February 2012, Bare joined Petter Øien at the 2012 Melodi Grand Prix to compete for Norway's entry to the 2012 Eurovision Song Contest to be held in Baku, Azerbaijan, in May. His song "Things Change" got through to the Norwegian final, in which Øien and Bare finished third.

== Filmography ==
- A Distant Trumpet (1964) ... Pvt. Cranshaw
- Bobbie Jo and the Outlaw (1976) ... Singer

== Discography ==
=== Solo studio albums ===
- 500 Miles Away from Home (1963)
- The Travelin' Bare (1964)
- Constant Sorrow (1965)
- Talk Me Some Sense (1966)
- The Streets of Baltimore (1966)
- This I Believe (1966)
- A Bird Named Yesterday (1967)
- "(Margie's At) The Lincoln Park Inn"
  and Other Controversial Songs (1969)
- This Is Bare Country (1970)
- The Real Thing (1970)
- Where Have All the Seasons Gone (1971)
- I Need Some Good News Bad (1971)
- What Am I Gonna Do (1972)
- I Hate Goodbyes/Ride Me Down Easy (1973)
- Bobby Bare Sings Lullabys, Legends and Lies (1973)
- Hard Time Hungrys (1975)
- Cowboys and Daddys (1975)
- The Winner and Other Losers (1976)
- Me and McDill (1977)
- Bare (1978)
- Sleeper Wherever I Fall (1978)
- Down & Dirty (1980)
- Drunk & Crazy (1980)
- As Is (1981)
- Ain't Got Nothin' to Lose (1982)
- Drinkin' from the Bottle, Singin' from the Heart (1983)
- Merry Christmas from Bobby Bare (1988)
- Fishin' Songs (1989)
- I Love an Old Fashioned Christmas (1993)
- The Moon Was Blue (2005)
- Darker Than Light (2012)
- Things Change (2017)
- Great American Saturday Night (2020)

== Awards and nominations ==
| Year | Organization | Award | Nominee/Work | Result |
|---|---|---|---|---|
| 1964 | Grammy Awards | Best Country & Western Recording | "Detroit City" | Won |
| 1965 | Grammy Awards | Best Country & Western Recording | "Four Strong Winds" | Nominated |
| 1965 | Grammy Awards | Best Country & Western Vocal Performance - Male | "Four Strong Winds" | Nominated |
| 1966 | Grammy Awards | Best Country & Western Vocal Performance - Male | "Talk Me Some Sense" | Nominated |
| 1968 | Grammy Awards | Best Country & Western Performance Duet, Trio or Group (Vocal or Instrumental) | "The Game of Triangles" | Nominated |
| 1975 | Grammy Awards | Best Country Performance by a Duo or Group with Vocal | "Daddy What If" | Nominated |
| 1999 | Country Music Association Awards | Musical Event of the Year | "Old Dogs" | Nominated |

== Other sources ==
- Vinicur, Dale. (1998). "Bobby Bare". In The Encyclopedia of Country Music. Paul Kingsbury, Editor. New York: Oxford University Press. pp. 28–29.
- Bobby Bare Sr. Interview at NAMM Oral History Collection (2017)
