= 17th Academy of Country Music Awards =

US music awards ceremony in 1982

- Date: April 30, 1982
- Location: Knott's Berry Farm, Buena Park, California
- Hosted by: Mickey Gilley; Conway Twitty; Dottie West

Highlights
- Most wins: Alabama (3)
- Most nominations: Alabama (5)

Television/radio coverage
- Network: NBC

The 17th Academy of Country Music Awards ceremony was held on April 30, 1982, at Knott's Berry Farm, Buena Park, California. It was hosted by Mickey Gilley, Conway Twitty and Dottie West.

== Winners and nominees ==
Winners are shown in bold.

Entertainer of the Year	Album of the Year
**Alabama**; Barbara Mandrell; Oak Ridge Boys; Dolly Parton; Kenny Rogers	**Feels So Right — Alabama**; 9 to 5 and Odd Jobs — Dolly Parton; Fancy Free — Oak Ridge Boys; Seven Year Ache — Rosanne Cash; Still the Same Ole Me — George Jones
Top Female Vocalist of the Year	Top Male Vocalist of the Year
**Barbara Mandrell**; Rosanne Cash; Lacy J. Dalton; Emmylou Harris; Sylvia	**Merle Haggard**; George Jones; Ronnie Milsap; Kenny Rogers; Hank Williams Jr.
Top Vocal Group of the Year	Top Vocal Duo of the Year
**Alabama**; Larry Gatlin & the Gatlin Brothers; Oak Ridge Boys; Statler Brothers; Tompall & the Glaser Brothers	**David Frizzell** **and** **Shelly West**; Moe Bandy and Joe Stampley; Louise Mandrell and R.C. Bannon; Conway Twitty and Loretta Lynn; Don Williams and Emmylou Harris
Single Record of the Year	Song of the Year
**"Elvira"** — **Oak Ridge Boys**; "I Was Country When Country Wasn't Cool" — Barbara Mandrell; "Seven Year Ache" — Rosanne Cash; "(There's) No Gettin' Over Me" — Ronnie Milsap; "You're the Reason God Made Oklahoma" — David Frizzell and Shelly West	**"You're the Reason God Made Oklahoma"** — **Felice Bryant, Boudleaux Bryant, Sandy Pinkard, Larry Collins**; "Feels So Right" — Randy Owen; "It Turns Me Inside Out" — Jan Crutchfield; "Love in the First Degree" — Tim DuBois, Jim Hurt; "My Favorite Memory" — Merle Haggard
Top New Male Vocalist	Top New Female Vocalist
**Ricky Skaggs**; Earl Thomas Conley; Lee Greenwood; Eddy Raven; John Schneider	**Juice Newton**; Judy Bailey; Kippi Brannon; Terry Gregory; Tricia Johns
Pioneer Award
**Leo Fender**
