= 1982 Country Music Association Awards =

Annual US music awards ceremony

- Date: October 11, 1982
- Location: Grand Ole Opry House, Nashville, Tennessee
- Hosted by: Mac Davis; Barbara Mandrell
- Most wins: Alabama (3)
- Most nominations: Alabama (5); Willie Nelson (5)

Television/radio coverage
- Network: CBS

The 1982 Country Music Association Awards, 16th Ceremony, was held on October 11, 1982, at the Grand Ole Opry House, Nashville, Tennessee, and was hosted by CMA Award winners Mac Davis and Barbara Mandrell.

== Winners and nominees ==
Winners in Bold.

Entertainer of the Year	Album of the Year
**Alabama**; Barbara Mandrell; Willie Nelson; Oak Ridge Boys; Ricky Skaggs	**Always On My Mind — Willie Nelson**; Big City — Merle Haggard; Bobbie Sue — Oak Ridge Boys; Mountain Music — Alabama; Still The Same Ole Me — George Jones
Male Vocalist of the Year	Female Vocalist of the Year
**Ricky Skaggs**; Merle Haggard; George Jones; Ronnie Milsap; Willie Nelson	**Janie Fricke**; Rosanne Cash; Emmylou Harris; Barbara Mandrell; Juice Newton
Vocal Group of the Year	Vocal Duo of the Year
**Alabama**; Larry Gatlin & The Gatlin Brothers; Oak Ridge Boys; Statler Brothers; Tompall and the Glaser Brothers	**David Frizzell and Shelly West**; Conway Twitty and Loretta Lynn; Don Williams and Emmylou Harris; George Jones and Merle Haggard; Waylon Jennings and Willie Nelson
Single of the Year	Song of the Year
**"Always On My Mind" — Willie Nelson**; "Crying My Heart Out Over You" — Ricky Skaggs; "I'm Gonna Hire A Wino To Decorate Our Home" — David Frizzell; "It Turns Me Inside Out" — Lee Greenwood; "Love In The First Degree" — Alabama	"**Always On My Mind** " **— Johnny Christopher, Wayne Carson, and Mark James**; "Elvira " — Dallas Frazier; "I'm Gonna Hire A Wino To Decorate Our Home " — Dewayne Blackwell; "It Turns Me Inside Out " — Jan Crutchfield; "You're The Reason God Made Oklahoma " — Larry Collins and Sandy Pinkard
Horizon Award	Instrumentalist of the Year
**Ricky Skaggs**; John Anderson; Rosanne Cash; David Frizzell; Lee Greenwood	**Chet Atkins**; Floyd Cramer; Johnny Gimble; Charlie McCoy; Hargus "Pig" Robbins
Instrumental Group of the Year
**Alabama**; Charlie Daniels Band; Grand Ole Opry Staff Band; Oak Ridge Boys Band; Ricky Skaggs Band

== Hall of Fame ==
Country Music Hall of Fame Inductees
- Lefty Frizzell
- Roy Horton
- Marty Robbins
