= 16 Biggest Hits (Merle Haggard album) =

Greatest hits album by Merle Haggard
- Released: July 14, 1998
- Genre: Country
- Length: 50:46
- Label: Legacy Recordings

Merle Haggard chronology
1996 (1996)	16 Biggest Hits (1998)	For the Record, 43 Legendary Hits (1999)

Professional ratings
Review scores
Source	Rating
Allmusic	2/5 stars

16 Biggest Hits is a 1998 Merle Haggard compilation album. It is part of a series of similar 16 Biggest Hits albums released by Legacy Recordings.

All songs except "Big City", "Are the Good Times Really Over (I Wish a Buck Was Still Silver)" and "Going Where the Lonely Go" are re-recordings from October 1994.

The album was certified Gold in 2002 by the RIAA. It has sold 955,000 copies in the US as of May 2013.

== Track listing ==
1. "Swinging Doors" (Merle Haggard) – 2:50
2. "The Bottle Let Me Down" (Haggard) – 2:42
3. "I'm a Lonesome Fugitive" (Casey Anderson, Liz Anderson) – 3:09
4. "Branded Man" (Haggard) – 3:09
5. "Sing Me Back Home" (Haggard) – 2:50
6. "Mama Tried" (Haggard) – 2:10
7. "Hungry Eyes" (Haggard) – 3:37
8. "Workin' Man Blues" (Haggard) – 2:41
9. "Okie from Muskogee" (Roy Edward Burris, Haggard) – 2:41
10. "The Fightin' Side of Me" (Haggard) – 2:52
11. "Daddy Frank (The Guitar Man)" (Haggard) – 3:39
12. "I Think I'll Just Stay Here and Drink" (Haggard) – 3:40
13. "Big City" (Haggard, Dean Holloway) – 3:00
14. "Are the Good Times Really Over (I Wish a Buck Was Still Silver)" (Haggard) – 4:14
15. "Going Where the Lonely Go" (Haggard, Holloway) – 4:50
16. "Silver Wings" (Haggard) – 2:47

== Personnel ==
- Merle Haggard – vocals, guitar

The Strangers:

- Roy Nichols – lead guitar
- Norman Hamlet – steel guitar
- Tiny Moore – mandolin, fiddle
- Eldon Shamblin– guitar
- Ralph Mooney – steel guitar
- Gene Price – bass
- Gordon Terry – fiddle
- Ronnie Reno – guitar
- Bobby Wayne – guitar
- Marcia Nichols – guitar
- Clint Strong – guitar
- Mark Yeary – piano
- George French – piano
- Dennis Hromek – bass
- James Tittle – bass
- Johnny Meeks – bass
- Jerry Ward – bass
- Wayne Durham – bass
- Biff Adam – drums
- Eddie Burris – drums
- Don Markham – saxophone
- Jimmy Belkin – fiddle
- Gary Church – horns

== Chart performance ==
16 Biggest Hits peaked at number 55 on the U.S. Billboard Top Country Albums chart in 1999.

Chart (1998–1999)	Peak position
US Billboard Top Country Albums	55
Chart (2016)	Peak position
US Billboard 200	167

== Certifications ==
Region	Certification	Certified units/sales
United States (RIAA)	Gold	500,000^{^}
^{^} Shipments figures based on certification alone.
