= Big City =

Big City may refer to:

== Music ==
- Big City (Lenny White album), 1977
- Big City (Merle Haggard album), 1981
- Big City (Billy Crawford album), 2005
- "Big City" (Merle Haggard song), 1982
- "Big City" (Spacemen 3 song), 1991
- "Big City", a song by Dutch singer Tol Hansse

== Movies ==
- Big City (1937 film), directed by Frank Borzage, starring Luise Rainer and Spencer Tracy
- Big City (1948 film), directed by Norman Taurog
- The Big City (1928 film), directed by Tod Browning
- The Big City (1963 film), directed by Satyajit Ray

== Places ==
- Big City (comics), a fictional future city in Antarctica
- New York City, often colloquially referred to as the Big City
- London, often referred to as the Big City
- Big City, a fictional city in the Northeastern United States from Big City Greens

== Other ==
- Big City (shopping mall), a shopping mall in Hsinchu, Taiwan
- Matt Adams, baseball player nicknamed "Big City"

== See also ==
- World's largest cities
- Metropolis
