= José Cuervo (song) =

Single by Shelly West

from the album West by West
- A-side: "Country Lullabye"
- Released: February 7, 1983
- Genre: Country
- Length: 2:42
- Label: Viva
- Songwriter: Cindy Jordan
- Producers: Snuff Garrett, Steve Dorff

Shelly West singles chronology
| "I Just Came Here to Dance" (1982) | "José Cuervo" (1983) | "Flight 309 to Tennessee" (1983) |

"José Cuervo" is a song written and originally recorded by Cindy Jordan in 1981. It was released as a single by American country music artist Shelly West in February 1983 to commercial success.

After a successful duet pairing with David Frizzell for three years, West went on her own to establish herself as a solo artist. Since her mother was country music singer Dottie West, success came easily with the release of this song in 1983. The song hit No. 1 on the Country charts and was West's second (and last) No. 1 since 1981's duet with David Frizzell, "You're the Reason God Made Oklahoma". The song provided a sales boost for the Jose Cuervo tequila company and brought even more success to West. The song was released on her first solo album, West by West.

== Content ==
The song is about a woman who drank too much Jose Cuervo tequila the night before.

The follow-up to her No. 1 hit was a Top 5 hit that same year titled, "Flight 309 to Tennessee".

== Charts ==
=== Weekly charts ===
| Chart (1983) | Peak position |
|---|---|
| US Hot Country Songs (Billboard) | 1 |
| Canadian RPM Country Tracks | 1 |

=== Year-end charts ===
| Chart (1983) | Position |
|---|---|
| US Hot Country Songs (Billboard) | 1 |
