= American Music Awards of 1982 =

US television program

9th Annual American Music Awards
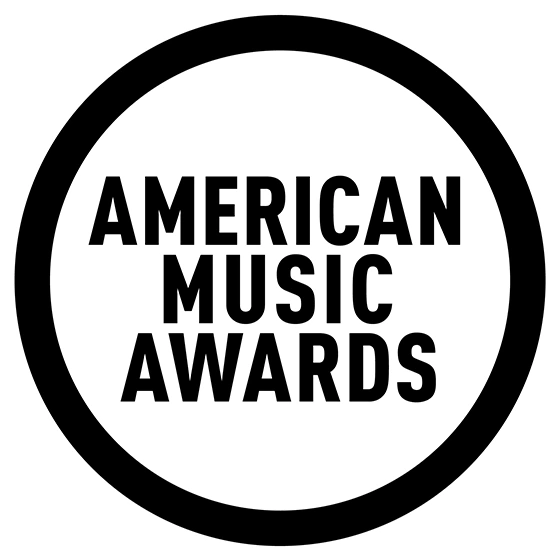
- Date: January 25, 1982
- Venue: Shrine Auditorium, Los Angeles, California
- Country: United States
- Hosted by: Glen Campbell; Donna Summer; Sheena Easton

Television/radio coverage
- Network: ABC
- Runtime: 180 min.
- Produced by: Dick Clark Productions

The ninth Annual American Music Awards were held on January 25, 1982.

== Winners and nominees ==
Subcategory	Winner	Nominees
Pop/Rock Categories
Favorite Pop/Rock Male Artist	Kenny Rogers	John Lennon; Eddie Rabbitt; Rick Springfield
Favorite Pop/Rock Female Artist	Pat Benatar	Sheena Easton; Juice Newton; Dolly Parton
Favorite Pop/Rock Band/Duo/Group	Air Supply	AC/DC; The Pointer Sisters; REO Speedwagon
Favorite Pop/Rock Album	Greatest Hits - Kenny Rogers	4 - Foreigner; Double Fantasy - John Lennon; Hi Infidelity - REO Speedwagon
Favorite Pop/Rock Song	"Endless Love" - Lionel Richie & Diana Ross	"Bette Davis Eyes" - Kim Carnes "Keep On Loving You" - REO Speedwagon "Jessie's Girl" - Rick Springfield
Soul/R&B Categories
Favorite Soul/R&B Male Artist	Stevie Wonder	Larry Graham; Rick James; Smokey Robinson
Favorite Soul/R&B Female Artist	Stephanie Mills	Chaka Khan; Stacy Lattisaw; Teena Marie
Favorite Soul/R&B Band/Duo/Group	Kool & The Gang	The Gap Band; Ray Parker Jr. & Raydio; The Whispers
Favorite Soul/R&B Album	Street Songs - Rick James	The Gap Band III - The Gap Band; The Dude - Quincy Jones; Hotter Than July - Stevie Wonder
Favorite Soul/R&B Song	"Endless Love" - Lionel Richie & Diana Ross	"Being with You" - Smokey Robinson "Give It to Me Baby" - Rick James "She's a Bad Mama Jama (She's Built, She's Stacked)" - Carl Carlton
Country Categories
Favorite Country Male Artist	Willie Nelson	Ronnie Milsap; T.G. Sheppard; Don Williams
Favorite Country Female Artist	Barbara Mandrell	Emmylou Harris; Anne Murray; Dolly Parton
Favorite Country Band/Duo/Group	The Oak Ridge Boys	Alabama; Willie Nelson & Ray Price; The Statler Brothers
Favorite Country Album	Greatest Hits - Kenny Rogers	Feels So Right - Alabama; Greatest Hits - Waylon Jennings; Anne Murray's Greatest Hits - Anne Murray
Favorite Country Song	"Could I Have This Dance" - Anne Murray "On The Road Again" - Willie Nelson	"Feels So Right" - Alabama "(There's) No Gettin' Over Me" - Ronnie Milsap
Merit
Stevie Wonder
