= C.C. Waterback =

Single by Merle Haggard and George Jones

from the album A Taste of Yesterday's Wine
- B-side: "After I Sing All My Songs"
- Released: December 1982
- Genre: Country
- Length: 3:29
- Label: Epic
- Songwriter(s): Merle Haggard
- Producer(s): Billy Sherrill

Merle Haggard singles chronology
"Going Where the Lonely Go" (1982)	"C.C. Waterback" (1982)	"Reasons to Quit" (1983)

George Jones singles chronology
"Yesterday's Wine" (1982)	"C.C. Waterback" (1982)	"Shine On (Shine All Your Sweet Love on Me)" (1983)

"C.C. Waterback" is a song recorded by American country music artists Merle Haggard and George Jones. It was released in December 1982 as the second single from the album A Taste of Yesterday's Wine. The song reached #10 on the Billboard Hot Country Singles & Tracks chart. The song was written by Haggard.

== Content ==
The song tells the story of a wild party "at the Jones' place" and the hangover that followed. At one point Merle laments that the woman he brought to the party "wound up in Jones' bed and I wound up on the floor." The track also features a New Orleans horn section.

The title of the song refers to a shot of Canadian Club whisky with a water chaser. While celebrating his new hit song in 1983 at Billy Bob's Texas, Merle Haggard bought a round of drinks for more than 5,000 fans in attendance, earning a spot in Guinness World Records that stood for decades.

== Chart performance ==
Chart (1982–1983)	Peak position
US Hot Country Songs (Billboard)	10
Canadian RPM Country Tracks	18
