= List of Top Country LPs number ones of 1981 =

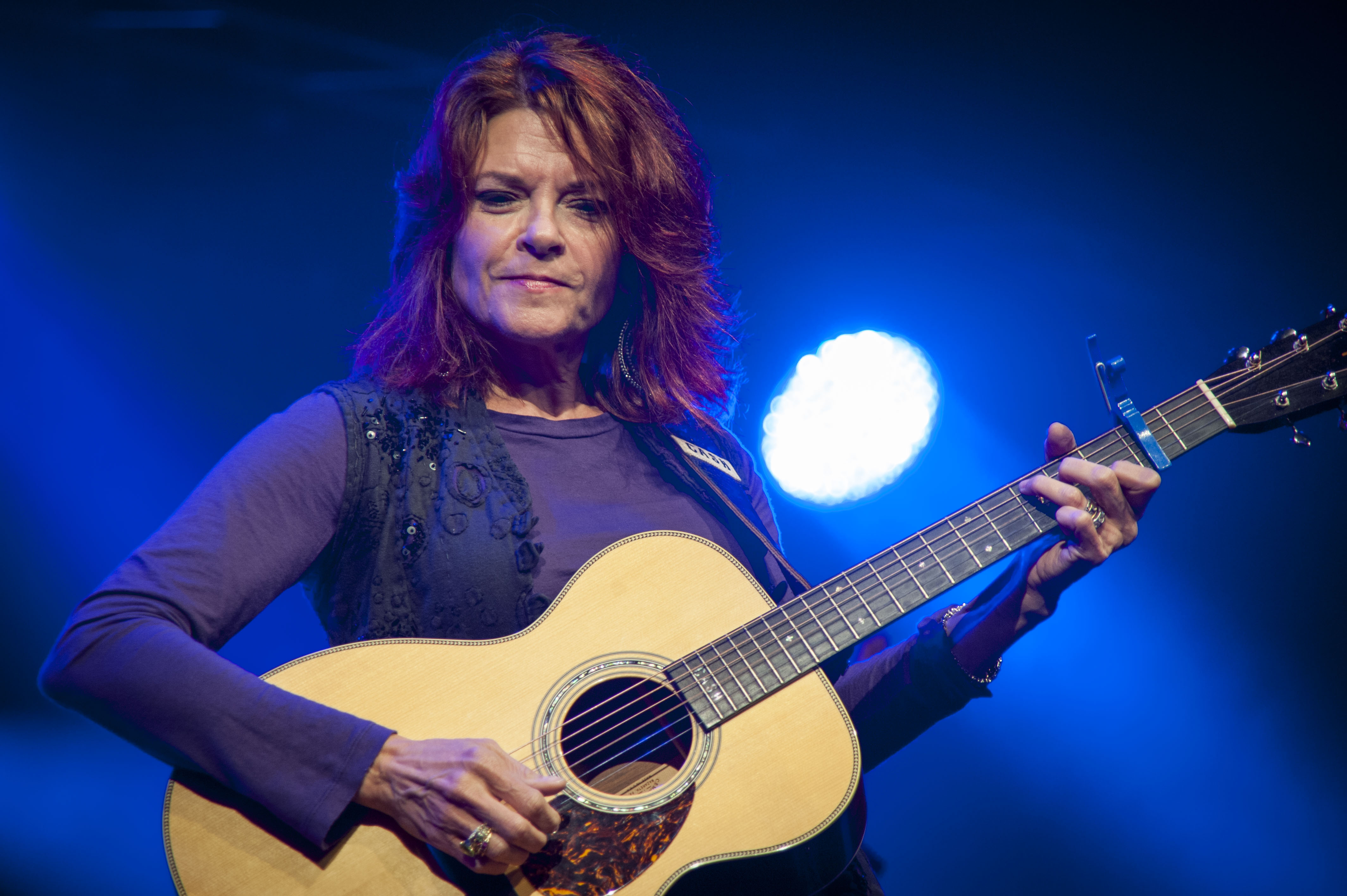
Rosanne Cash topped the chart for the first time in 1981. Her father Johnny Cash had been at number one on the first country albums chart published by Billboard in 1964.

Top Country Albums is a chart that ranks the top-performing country music albums in the United States, published by Billboard. In 1981, 12 different albums topped the chart, which was at the time published under the title Top Country LPs, based on sales reports submitted by a representative sample of stores nationwide.

In the issue of Billboard dated January 3, Kenny Rogers was at number one with his album Greatest Hits, its seventh week in the top spot. Rogers returned to the top of the chart in August with Share Your Love and was one of four artists to achieve two number ones in 1981, along with Ronnie Milsap, Willie Nelson and Eddie Rabbitt. Rogers had achieved great success since 1978, with the smooth production of his records appealing to both country and pop audiences. In less than four years he had achieved eight number one albums, but his chart placings would begin to decline in the 1980s and, even though he would continue to record well into the 21st century, he would only gain two more number ones.

In May the band Alabama gained its first number one with the album Feels So Right. After an initial spell of two weeks in the top spot, the album would go on to make repeated returns to number one for the remainder of the year. By the end of 1981 it had spent a total of 17 weeks atop the chart, the most by any album during the year. It would continue to return to number one in the first half of 1982 and would achieve a final total of 28 weeks at number one, a new record for the country albums chart. The first band to achieve stardom in country music, a genre traditionally dominated by solo artists, Alabama would go on to become the most successful country act of the 1980s, with more than 25 chart-topping singles. Feels So Right was the first of ten number-one albums which the group achieved in the 1980s, a run interrupted only by the seasonal album Christmas in 1985. The Oak Ridge Boys also topped the chart for the first time in 1981. The group had originated as a gospel act which first recorded in 1947 before switching to country music in the 1970s and reaching its commercial peak in the first half of the 1980s. Fancy Free was the first of three chart-topping albums which the group achieved in this period and the biggest-selling of its career.

== Chart history ==
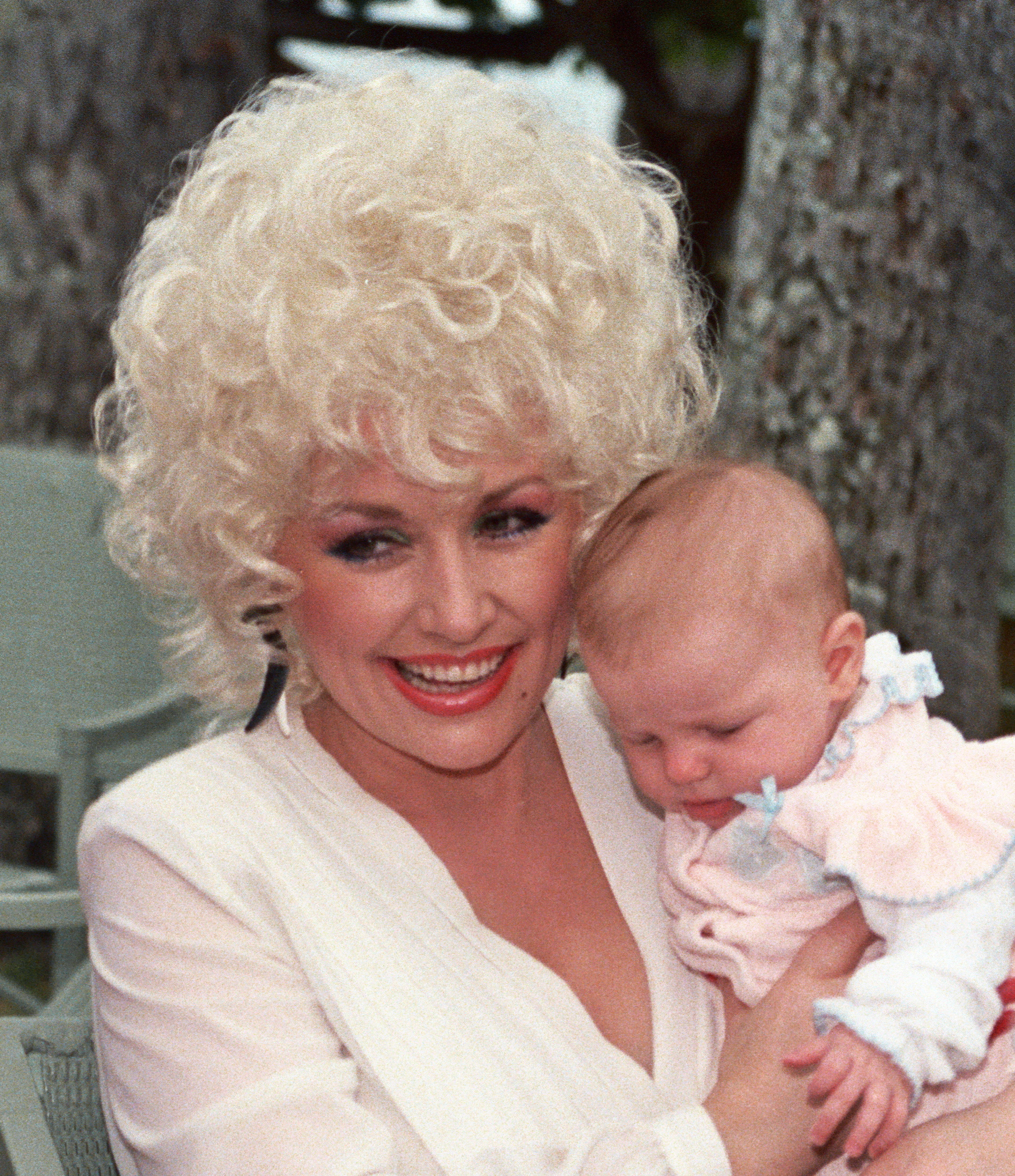
Dolly Parton had the year's longest unbroken run at number one with 9 to 5 and Odd Jobs.

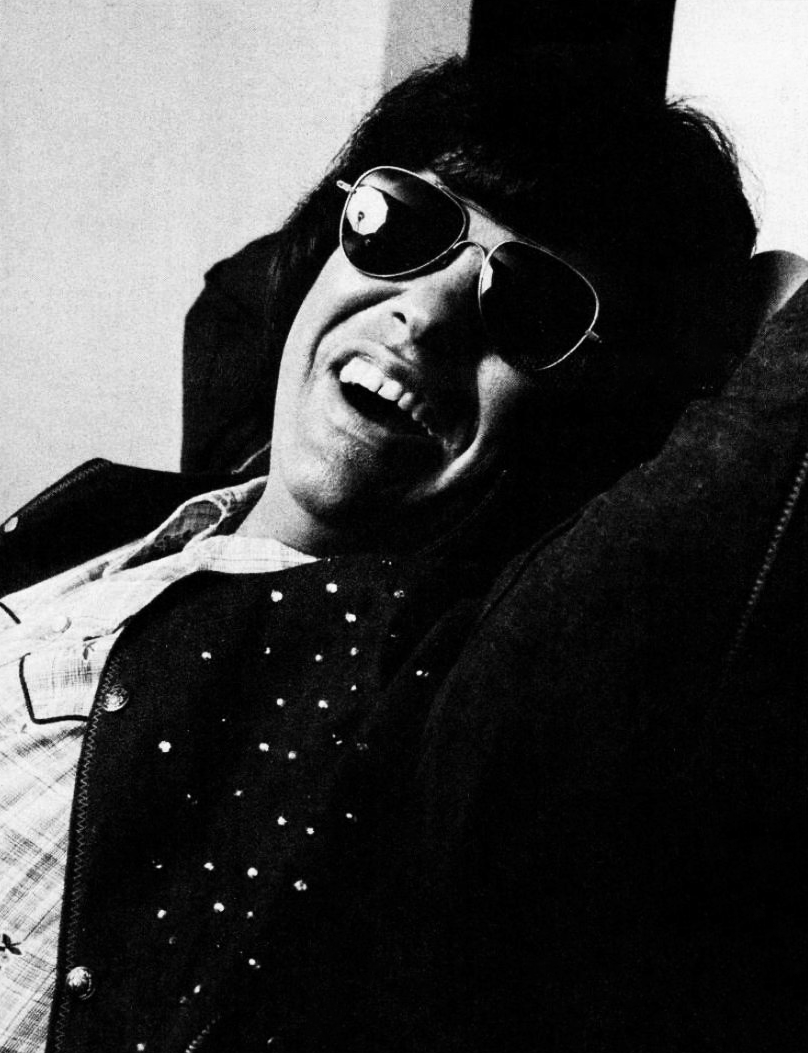
Ronnie Milsap had two number ones in 1981.

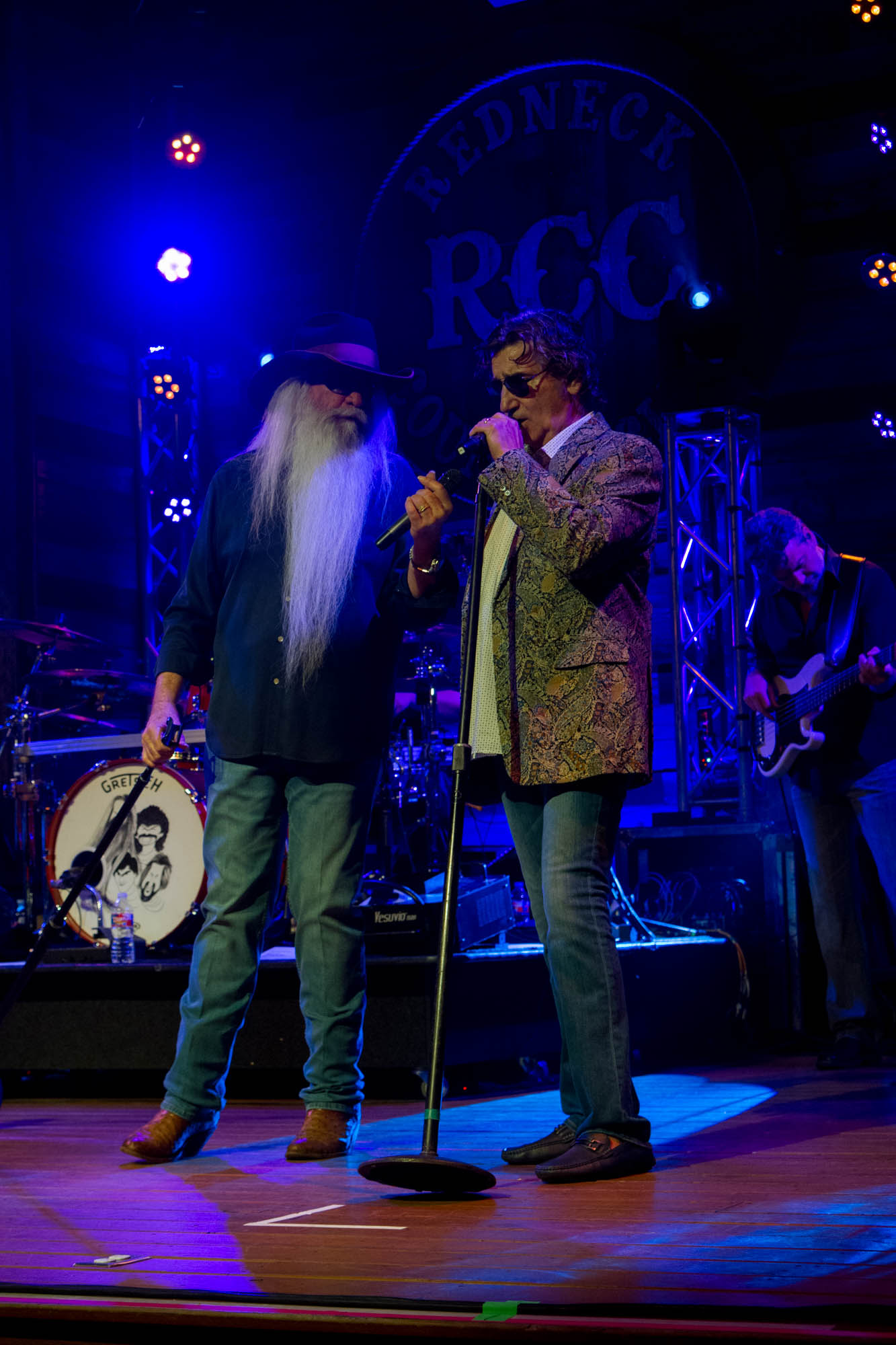
Fancy Free was the first number one for the Oak Ridge Boys (group members William Lee Golden and Richard Sterban pictured).

Issue date	Title	Artist(s)	Ref.
January 3	Greatest Hits	Kenny Rogers	
January 10	Greatest Hits	Kenny Rogers	
January 17	Greatest Hits	Kenny Rogers	
January 24	Greatest Hits	Ronnie Milsap	
January 31	Greatest Hits	Kenny Rogers	
February 7	Greatest Hits	Kenny Rogers	
February 14	9 to 5 and Odd Jobs	Dolly Parton	
February 21	9 to 5 and Odd Jobs	Dolly Parton	
February 28	9 to 5 and Odd Jobs	Dolly Parton	
March 7	9 to 5 and Odd Jobs	Dolly Parton	
March 14	9 to 5 and Odd Jobs	Dolly Parton	
March 21	9 to 5 and Odd Jobs	Dolly Parton	
March 28	9 to 5 and Odd Jobs	Dolly Parton	
April 4	9 to 5 and Odd Jobs	Dolly Parton	
April 11	9 to 5 and Odd Jobs	Dolly Parton	
April 18	9 to 5 and Odd Jobs	Dolly Parton	
April 25	Horizon	Eddie Rabbitt	
May 2	Somewhere Over the Rainbow	Willie Nelson	
May 9	Somewhere Over the Rainbow	Willie Nelson	
May 16	Somewhere Over the Rainbow	Willie Nelson	
May 23	Feels So Right	Alabama	
May 30	Feels So Right	Alabama	
June 6	Seven Year Ache	Rosanne Cash	
June 13	Seven Year Ache	Rosanne Cash	
June 20	Feels So Right	Alabama	
June 27	Feels So Right	Alabama	
July 4	Feels So Right	Alabama	
July 11	Feels So Right	Alabama	
July 18	Fancy Free	The Oak Ridge Boys	
July 25	Feels So Right	Alabama	
August 1	Fancy Free	The Oak Ridge Boys	
August 8	Feels So Right	Alabama	
August 15	Feels So Right	Alabama	
August 22	Feels So Right	Alabama	
August 29	Share Your Love	Kenny Rogers	
September 5	Share Your Love	Kenny Rogers	
September 12	Feels So Right	Alabama	
September 19	Feels So Right	Alabama	
September 26	Step by Step	Eddie Rabbitt	
October 3	Step by Step	Eddie Rabbitt	
October 10	Step by Step	Eddie Rabbitt	
October 17	There's No Gettin' Over Me	Ronnie Milsap	
October 24	There's No Gettin' Over Me	Ronnie Milsap	
October 31	Feels So Right	Alabama	
November 7	Feels So Right	Alabama	
November 14	Feels So Right	Alabama	
November 21	There's No Gettin' Over Me	Ronnie Milsap	
November 28	Feels So Right	Alabama	
December 5	Greatest Hits (& Some That Will Be)	Willie Nelson	
December 12	Greatest Hits (& Some That Will Be)	Willie Nelson	
December 19	Greatest Hits (& Some That Will Be)	Willie Nelson	
December 26	Feels So Right	Alabama	
