= Yesterday's Wine (song) =

1971 single by Willie Nelson

Single by Willie Nelson

from the album Yesterday's Wine
- B-side: "Me and Paul"
- Released: October 23, 1971
- Recorded: May 3, 1971
- Studio: RCA Studio B (Nashville, Tennessee)
- Genre: Country
- Length: 3:15
- Label: RCA Victor
- Songwriter: Willie Nelson
- Producer: Felton Jarvis

Willie Nelson singles chronology
"What Can You Do to Me Now?" (1971)	"Yesterday's Wine" (1971)	"The Words Don't Fit the Picture" (1972)

"Yesterday's Wine"

Single by Merle Haggard and George Jones

from the album A Taste of Yesterday's Wine
- B-side: "I Haven't Found Her Yet"
- Released: August 7, 1982
- Recorded: May 17, 1982
- Genre: Country
- Length: 3:15
- Label: Epic
- Songwriter: Willie Nelson
- Producer: Billy Sherrill

Merle Haggard singles chronology
"Are the Good Times Really Over (I Wish a Buck Was Still Silver)" (1982)	"Yesterday's Wine" (1982)	"Going Where the Lonely Go" (1982)

George Jones singles chronology
"Same Ole Me" (1982)	"Yesterday's Wine" (1982)	"C.C. Waterback" (1982)

"Yesterday's Wine" is the title track of the 1971 Willie Nelson album Yesterday's Wine. The track was written by Nelson, and it later became a number 1 duet for George Jones and Merle Haggard in 1982.

== Background ==
"Yesterday's Wine" was released as a single by RCA in the fall of 1971. Its parent album, which opened with a peculiar existential dialogue featuring Nelson and contained songs with philosophical and spiritual themes, confounded the label, with the singer later lamenting, "I think it's one of my best albums but Yesterday's Wine was regarded by RCA as way too spooky and far out to waste promotion money on." Although it was perhaps the LP's most accessible track, and has since become regarded as one of Nelson's finest compositions, "Yesterday's Wine" limped to #62 on the Billboard country survey. RCA appeared to realize its folly five years later Jerry Bradley included it on the Wanted! The Outlaws compilation after Nelson's popularity had exploded. The song, a tale of two old friends meeting up unexpectedly in a bar after many years, was a perfect fit for the outlaw-themed record.

In 1982, Merle Haggard and George Jones recorded a duet of "Yesterday's Wine" which became a #1 single, remaining so for one week and spending a total of ten weeks on the chart. The song inspired the title of their first duet LP, A Taste of Yesterday's Wine, and was a natural fit for the two singers, who were often singled out as two of the finest interpreters of pure country music and had both battled many personal demons over the course of their respective careers.

== Chart performance ==
Chart (1971)	Peak position
US Hot Country Songs (Billboard)	62

=== Chart performance ===
Chart (1982)	Peak position
US Hot Country Songs (Billboard)	1
Canadian RPM Country Tracks	5
