= A Taste of Yesterday's Wine =

Studio album by George Jones and Merle Haggard
- Released: August 1982
- Genre: Country
- Length: 31:40
- Label: Epic/Hallmark
- Producer: Billy Sherrill

George Jones chronology
Still the Same Ole Me (1981)	A Taste of Yesterday's Wine (1982)	Anniversary – 10 Years of Hits (1982)

Merle Haggard chronology
Merle Haggard's Greatest Hits (1982)	A Taste of Yesterday's Wine (1982)	Going Where the Lonely Go (1982)

Singles from A Taste of Yesterday's Wine
- 1. "Yesterday's Wine" Released: August 7, 1982; 2. "C.C. Waterback" Released: December 1982

A Taste of Yesterday's Wine is a duet studio album by American country music artists George Jones and Merle Haggard, released in 1982. They are backed by Don Markham and Jimmy Belken of the Strangers. The album includes the song "Silver Eagle", written by Gary Church, also of the Strangers. This was their first album together; their next album together, Kickin' Out the Footlights...Again, did not come until 24 years later in 2006.

== Background ==
Jones and Haggard were largely influenced by the Hank Williams and Lefty Frizzell tradition. They had also made no secret of how much they admired each other's work. In a Rolling Stone tribute to Jones after his death in 2013, Haggard recalled their first meeting: "I met him at the Blackboard Café in Bakersfield, California, which was the place to go in '61. He was already famous for not showing up or showing up drunk, and he showed up drunk. I was onstage—I think I was singing Marty Robbins' "Devil Woman" —and he kicked the doors of the office open and said 'Who the fuck is that?'" Haggard added that Jones's voice was "like a Stradivarius violin: one of the greatest instruments ever made". Jones had said repeatedly over the years that, next to Hank Williams, Haggard was his favorite singer. A Taste of Yesterday's Wine includes tributes to both of them: "Silver Eagle", written by Freddy Powers and Gary Church about Haggard, and "No Show Jones", written by Jones and Glenn Martin about the wayward singer's notorious inability to arrive at concert dates. The album's first single was the Willie Nelson-penned title track, which became a number one hit. A second single, "C.C. Waterback", reached number 10. The LP was produced by Billy Sherrill and has backing vocals by Haggard's wife Leona Williams.

In the UK, Hallmark Records issued an LP with the same title, artwork and tracks, but with a different track order.

== Critical reception ==
Professional ratings
Review scores
Source	Rating
AllMusic	3/5 stars

Thom Jurek of AllMusic praises the album, marveling that the pair's voices "blend seamlessly and compliment [sic] each other in almost symbiotic fashion... Billy Sherrill in the producer's chair was swinging for the radio fences, and he got close, but even he stayed the hell out of the way most of the time here and let the music take its course, and this pair just treated each other deferentially."

== Track listing (Epic) ==
No.	Title	Writer(s)	Length
1.	"Yesterday's Wine"	Willie Nelson	3:15
2.	"After I Sing All My Songs"	Leona Williams	3:16
3.	"I Think I've Found a Way (To Live Without You)"	Merle Haggard	3:29
4.	"The Brothers"	Dave Kirby	4:03
5.	"Mobile Bay (Magnolia Blossoms)"	Kirby, Curly Putman	3:18
6.	"C.C. Waterback"	Haggard	3:37
7.	"Silver Eagle"	Gary Church, Freddy Powers	2:40
8.	"Must've Been Drunk"	Max D. Barnes, Vern Gosdin	2:40
9.	"I Haven't Found Her Yet"	Haggard, Johnny Paycheck	2:27
10.	"No Show Jones"	George Jones, Glenn Martin	2:26

== Track listing (Hallmark) ==
No.	Title	Writer(s)	Length
1.	"Yesterday's Wine"	Willie Nelson	3:15
2.	"I Haven't Found Her Yet"	Haggard, Johnny Paycheck	2:27
3.	"I Think I've Found a Way (To Live Without You)"	Merle Haggard	3:29
4.	"Silver Eagle"	Gary Church, Freddy Powers	2:40
5.	"Mobile Bay (Magnolia Blossoms)"	Kirby, Curly Putman	3:18
6.	"C.C. Waterback"	Haggard	3:37
7.	"The Brothers"	Dave Kirby	4:03
8.	"Must've Been Drunk"	Max D. Barnes, Vern Gosdin	2:40
9.	"After I Sing All My Songs"	Leona Williams	3:16
10.	"No Show Jones"	George Jones, Glenn Martin	2:26

== Personnel ==
- Merle Haggard & George Jones – vocals
- Don Markham – trombone, trumpet
- Jimmy Belkin – fiddle
- Dave Kirby, Freddy Powers, Billy Sanford, Pete Bordonali, & Bobby Thompson – guitars
- Weldon Myrick – steel guitar
- Hargus "Pig" Robbins, Bobby Wood, & Bobby Emmons – keyboards
- Terry McMillan – harmonica
- Leona Williams, Karen Taylor, Lea Jane Berinati, Hershel Wilginton, & Dennis Wilson – backing vocals
