= Alabama & Friends =

2013 album by the American band, Alabama

Studio album by Various Artists
- Released: August 27, 2013
- Genre: Country
- Length: 42:24
- Label: Show Dog-Universal Music
- Producer: Various

Alabama & Friends is a tribute album to American country rock group Alabama. It was released on August 27, 2013 via Show Dog-Universal Music. The album includes two new tracks, "That's How I Was Raised" and "All American", performed by Alabama.

The album debuted at No. 8 on the Billboard 200 and No. 2 on the Top Country Albums, selling 32,000 copies in the United States in the first week.

The artists on the album also later performed a tribute concert in Nashville, Tennessee at the historic Ryman Auditorium. The show was filmed, and the film was released on 2-disc DVD, titled "Alabama & Friends – At The Ryman", on September 30, 2014 via Eagle Rock Entertainment.

== Track listing ==
No.	Title	Writer(s)	Producer	Length
1.	"Tennessee River" (Jason Aldean)	Randy Owen	Michael Knox	4:22
2.	"Love in the First Degree" (Luke Bryan)	Tim DuBois, Jim Hurt	Jeff Stevens	3:23
3.	"Old Flame" (Rascal Flatts)	Donny Lowery, Mac McAnally	Jay DeMarcus	3:12
4.	"Lady Down on Love" (Kenny Chesney)	Owen	Buddy Cannon	3:57
5.	"The Closer You Get" (Eli Young Band)	J.P. Pennington, Mark Gray	Knox	3:38
6.	"Forever's as Far as I'll Go" (Trisha Yearwood)	Mike Reid	Garth Fundis	3:35
7.	"She and I" (Toby Keith)	Dave Loggins	Toby Keith	3:56
8.	"I'm in a Hurry (And Don't Know Why)" (Florida Georgia Line)	Roger Murrah, Randy VanWarmer	Joey Moi	2:51
9.	"That's How I Was Raised" (Alabama)	Charley Stefl, Tony Ramey, Skip Sasser, Trent Tomlinson	Harold Shedd	3:40
10.	"All American" (Alabama)	Trey Bruce	Shedd	3:13
11.	"My Home's in Alabama" (Jamey Johnson)	Owen, Teddy Gentry	Jamey Johnson	6:37

== Personnel ==
Alabama

- Jeff Cook – electric guitar, background vocals, producer
- Teddy Gentry – bass guitar, background vocals, producer
- Randy Owen – acoustic guitar, electric guitar, lead vocals, background vocals, producer

Additional Musicians

- Tim Akers – Hammond B-3 organ, piano
- Jason Aldean – lead vocals on "Tennessee River"
- Kurt Allison – electric guitar
- David Angell – violin
- Richard Bennett – electric guitar
- Luke Bryan – lead vocals on "Love in the First Degree"
- Pat Buchanan – electric guitar
- Tom Bukovac – electric guitar
- John Catchings – cello
- Kenny Chesney – lead vocals on "Lady Down on Love"
- Jason Cope – electric guitar
- J.T. Corenflos – electric guitar
- Mark Crum – bass guitar
- Eric Darken – percussion
- David Davidson – violin
- Jay DeMarcus – bass guitar and background vocals on "Old Flame"
- Mike Eli – acoustic guitar and lead vocals on "The Closer You Get"
- Shawn Fichter – drums
- Johnny Garcia – electric guitar
- Kenny Greenberg – electric guitar
- Tony Harrell – keyboards
- Chris Hennessee – harmonica
- Wes Hightower – background vocals
- Tyler Hubbard – lead vocals on "I'm in a Hurry (And Don't Know Why)
- Jamey Johnson – acoustic guitar and lead vocals on "My Home's in Alabama"
- Jon Jones – bass guitar and background vocals on "The Closer You Get"
- Charlie Judge – Hammond B-3 organ, piano, synthesizer
- Toby Keith – lead vocals on "She and I"
- Brian Kelley – background vocals on "I'm in a Hurry (And Don't Know Why)"
- Tully Kennedy – bass guitar
- Anthony LaMarchina – cello
- Gary LeVox – lead vocals on "Old Flame"
- Joey Moi – acoustic guitar, electric guitar
- Greg Morrow – drums, percussion
- Steve Nathan – keyboards
- Mary Kathryn Van Osdale – violin
- Larry Paxton – bass guitar
- Ethan Pilzer – bass guitar
- Chris Powell – drums
- Gary Prim – synthesizer
- Danny Rader – acoustic guitar, electric guitar
- Rich Redmond – drums, percussion
- Mike Reid – piano
- Michael Rhodes – bass guitar
- Jim Riley – drums
- Mike Rojas – Hammond B-3 organ, keyboards, piano
- Joe Don Rooney – electric guitar and background vocals on "Old Flame"
- John Scott – piano, synthesizer strings
- Steve Sheehan – acoustic guitar
- Adam Shoenfeld – electric guitar
- Pam Sixfin – violin
- Jimmie Lee Sloas – bass guitar
- Bryan Sutton – acoustic guitar
- Chris Thompson – drums on "The Closer You Get"
- Ilya Toshinsky – banjo, dobola, acoustic guitar, electric guitar, mandolin
- Wanda Vick – fiddle
- Roger Weismeyer – oboe
- Kristin Wilkinson – viola
- John Willis – acoustic guitar
- Trisha Yearwood – lead vocals on "Forever's as Far as I'll Go"
- James Young – electric guitar and background vocals on "The Closer You Get"

Production

- Derek Bason – engineer, mixing
- Drew Bollman – production assistant
- Buddy Cannon – producer
- T.W. Cargile – engineer, mixing, overdubs
- Tony Castle – engineer
- Peter Coleman – engineer, mixing
- Mickey Jack Cones – editing
- Scott Cooke – digital editing
- Juanita Copeland – production assistant
- Jay DeMarcus – Producer
- Richard Dodd – mastering
- Leland Elliott – production assistant
- Charles English – engineer
- Brandon Epps – digital editing, editing
- Shannon Finnegan – production assistant
- Fletcher Foster – executive producer
- Garth Fundis – producer
- Shalacy Griffin – production assistant
- Mike "Frog" Griffith – production assistant
- Schatzi Hageman – publicity
- Gordon Hammond – engineer
- Carie Higdon – project coordinator
- Alex Jarvis – production assistant, digital editing
- Jamey Johnson – producer
- Scott Johnson – production assistant
- Toby Keith – producer
- Michael Knox – producer
- Stephen Lamb – copyist
- Miles Logan – engineer, mixing
- Sam Martin – production assistant
- Joey Moi – engineer, mixing, producer, programming
- Natalie Moore – art direction
- Sean Neff – engineer, mixing
- Justin Niebank – mixing
- Taylor Nyquist – production assistant
- Ernesto Olvera – production assistant
- Alison Owen – photography
- Evan Owen – production assistant
- Susannah Parrish – art direction, design
- Ronnie Pinnell – production assistant
- Rich Redmond – drum programming
- Lowell Reynolds – production assistant
- Ed Seay – engineer, mixing
- Harold Shedd – producer
- Chris Small – production assistant
- Jarod Snowden – production assistant
- Mike Stankiewicz – production assistant
- Jeff Stevens – producer
- Gaines Sturdivant – project manager
- Todd Tidwell – production assistant
- Kristin Wilkinson – string arrangements
- Hank Williams Jr. – mastering
- Mark Wright – executive producer

== Charts ==
=== Weekly charts ===
Chart (2013)	Peak position
US Billboard 200	8
US Top Country Albums (Billboard)	2

=== Year-end charts ===
Chart (2013)	Position
US Top Country Albums (Billboard)	52
