= Lost My Baby =

Lost My Baby or I Lost My Baby may refer to:

- "Lost My Baby Blues", a song by David Frizzell
- "Since I Lost My Baby", a song by The Temptations
