= Flight 309 =

Flight 309 may refer to:

- Air Caribbean Flight 309, crashed on 26 September 1978
- "Flight 309 to Tennessee", a song written by Ronnie Scott
