= A Texas State of Mind =

Single by David Frizzell and Shelly West

from the album Carryin' On the Family Names
- B-side: "Let's Duet"
- Released: August 20, 1981
- Genre: Country
- Length: 2:40
- Label: Warner Bros.
- Songwriter(s): Cliff Crofford, John Durrill, Snuff Garrett
- Producer(s): Snuff Garrett, Steve Dorff

David Frizzell and Shelly West singles chronology
"You're the Reason God Made Oklahoma" (1981)	"A Texas State of Mind" (1981)	"Husbands and Wives" (1981)

"A Texas State of Mind" is a song written by Cliff Crofford, John Durrill and Snuff Garrett, and recorded by American country music artists David Frizzell and Shelly West. It was released in August 1981 as the second single from the album Carryin' On the Family Names. The song reached #9 on the Billboard Hot Country Singles & Tracks chart.

== Chart performance ==
Chart (1981)	Peak position
U.S. Billboard Hot Country Singles & Tracks	9
