= Pinkard & Bowden =

American country music duo

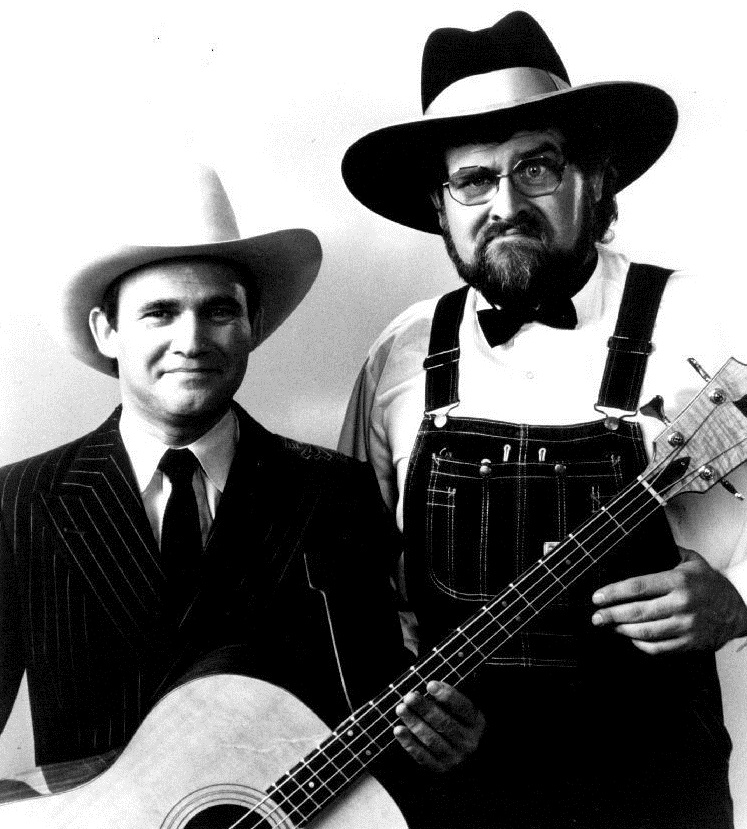
- Pinkard & Bowden in 1985

Background information
- Origin: Nashville, Tennessee, U.S.
- Genres: Country; comedy; parody; bluegrass
- Years active: 1984–1998
- Label: Warner Bros.
- Past members: Richard Bowden; Sandy Pinkard

Pinkard & Bowden were an American country music duo composed of singer-songwriters James "Sandy" Pinkard and Richard Bowden (/ˈbaʊdən/), who also play guitar and bass guitar. The duo's music comprises a mix of musical parody and original comedy songs. Pinkard has also written hit singles for Mel Tillis, Anne Murray, and Vern Gosdin, among others. Between 1984 and 1992, Pinkard & Bowden recorded four albums for Warner Bros. Records.

== Biography ==
James "Sandy" Pinkard was born January 16, 1947, in Abbeville, Louisiana. He got his start in Nashville, Tennessee, in the mid-1970s. Among his hits as a writer were "You're the Reason God Made Oklahoma" (a duet by Shelly West and David Frizzell), "Coca Cola Cowboy" by Mel Tillis, and "Blessed Are the Believers" by Anne Murray.

Richard Bowden was born on September 30, 1945, in Linden, Texas, While in high school, he played in a Dixieland band formed by his father Elmer, which also included his childhood friend Don Henley. Bowden and Henley then formed a band called the Four Speeds, which changed its name to Felicity, then Shiloh. Shiloh disbanded in 1971 over the band's leadership and creative differences between Henley and Bowden, as Bowden wanted the band to be more country while Henley did not. After Henley left to form Eagles, Bowden briefly toured as a member of Roger McGuinn's band, which opened for Eagles. Bowden came out with his own album in 2003 called "Big Bad Johnson".

Jim Ed Norman, who was also in Shiloh, introduced Pinkard and Bowden to each other, and the two began writing songs together. After discovering that they were both writing songs that were humorous in nature, the two decided to form a comedy duo, and released their debut album Writers in Disguise in 1984. It was led off by a parody montage entitled "Adventures in Parodies," which included parodies of Sammi Smith's "Help Me Make It Through the Night ("Help Me Make It Through The Yard")," Johnny Cash's "Daddy Sang Bass," Tanya Tucker's "Delta Dawn," B.J. Thomas' "(Hey Won't You Play) Another Somebody Done Somebody Wrong Song," Eddie Rabbitt's "Drivin' My Life Away" ("Drivin' My Wife Away"), Claude King's "Wolverton Mountain," Willie Nelson's "Blue Eyes Crying in the Rain" and Michael Martin Murphey's "What's Forever For." This album also included their only Top 40 hit on the country charts, "Mama She's Lazy" (a parody of The Judds' "Mama He's Crazy"), as well as the parodies "Libyan on a Jet Plane" (John Denver's "Leaving on a Jet Plane"), "She Thinks I Steal Cars" (George Jones' "She Thinks I Still Care") and "Arab, Alabama," a partial parody of Waylon Jennings' "Good Hearted Woman."

In 1985 the pair performed a concert with Ray Stevens at the Lanierland Music Park in Georgia. That year they released the album PG-13. A live album called Live! was released in 1990, with Cousins, Cattle, and Other Love Stories coming in 1992. This album was a split compilation, mixing live and studio tracks. All four albums featured songs that were co-written by Tim Wilson, who would become a comedian and singer himself in the early 1990s. A "greatest hits" album, Gettin' Stupid, followed in 1993, which was widely advertised on commercials to order by mail or phone.

Pinkard died of undisclosed causes on July 26, 2025.

== Style ==
Pinkard & Bowden have been compared to Homer & Jethro, a country duo popular from the 1940s through the 1960s, whose act also comprised a mix of parody and original songs. Unlike Homer & Jethro, Pinkard & Bowden's material was often profane in nature; Pinkard & Bowden were the first country comedy act to have explicit content warnings on its albums, and the duo were banned from appearing on The Nashville Network (now Paramount Network). Pinkard & Bowden's parodies are sometimes topical in nature, such as "Friends in Crawl Spaces", a parody of Garth Brooks's "Friends in Low Places" which referenced serial killer Jeffrey Dahmer.

== Discography ==
=== Albums ===
Year	Album	US Country	Label
1984	Writers in Disguise	47	Warner Bros.
1985	PG-13	—	Warner Bros.
1990	Live! (In Front of a Bunch of D*ckhe*ds)	—	Warner Bros.
1992	Cousins, Cattle and Other Love Stories	—	Warner Bros.
1993	Gettin' Stupid	—	Cornerstone Promotions; Warner Specialty

=== Singles ===
Year	Single	Chart Positions	Album
Year	Single	US Country	Album
1984	"Adventures in Parodies"	64	Writers in Disguise
1984	"I Lobster But Never Flounder"	—	Writers in Disguise
1984	"Mama, She's Lazy"	39	PG-13
1985	"The Ballad of Dick and Jane"	—	PG-13
1985	"The Christmas Gift"	—	single only
1986	"She Thinks I Steal Cars"	92	Gettin' Stupid
1988	"Arab, Alabama"	87	Gettin' Stupid
1989	"Libyan on a Jet Plane"	79	Gettin' Stupid

=== Music videos ===
Year	Video	Director
1988	"Arab, Alabama"	Jim May/Coke Sams
