= Lanierland Music Park =

Historic Music Venue in Georgia

Coordinates: 34°18′52″N 84°2′2″W

Lanierland Music Park was a country music venue in the town of Cumming, Georgia. The venue was opened in 1970 and hosted notable musical acts until 2006. The venue's land was then converted to Lanierland Park, a Forsyth County Parks and Recreation facility for community use.

== History ==
=== Founding and ownership ===
Lanierland Music Park was founded in 1970 by Forsyth County-natives, C.E."Crant" Samples and M.L. "Shorty" Hamby, as a music venue under a tent which could hold 1800 people. The venue opened with Hank Williams Jr. performing two sold-out shows. In order to extend capital and grow the venue, eventually new owners Leon Jones, Robert Jones and Tommy Bagwell were added to the team. As the venue grew, ownership dwindled to Jones and his wife, Brenda, as well as Bagwell.

=== Venue and seating ===
In 1973 the tent was replaced by a large, metal, open-air pavilion with folding chairs. Although the overhang changed, the sawdust floors remained until the venue's closing, providing a unique acoustical experience. At the time of its closing, the venue boasted a 100-foot stage and seating for 4,346. Brenda Jones' mother, known as Mama Lois, provided performers with a home-cooked southern meal prior to each performance.

=== Notable acts ===
Performers include:

- Hank Williams Jr.
- Loretta Lynn
- George Jones
- Dolly Parton
- Porter Wagoner
- Tammy Wynette
- Oak Ridge Boys
- Merle Haggard
- Kenny Rogers
- Sammy Kershaw
- Marty Stuart
- Naomi Judd
- The Beach Boys
- America
- Alabama
- Waylon Jennings
- Lyle Lovett
- Ronnie Milsap
- Charlie Daniels Band
- Vince Gill
- Charley Pride
- Emmylou Harris
- Mel Tillis
- Dierks Bentley
- Pinkard and Bowden
- Tanya Tucker
- Ray Stevens
