= Another Honky-Tonk Night on Broadway =

Single by David Frizzell and Shelly West

from the album The David Frizzell & Shelly West Album
- B-side: "Three Act Play"
- Released: February 6, 1982
- Genre: Country
- Length: 2:52
- Label: Warner Bros.
- Songwriter(s): Steve Dorff, Snuff Garrett, Milton Brown
- Producer(s): Snuff Garrett, Steve Dorff

David Frizzell singles chronology
| "Husbands and Wives" (1981) | "Another Honky-Tonk Night on Broadway" (1982) | "I'm Gonna Hire a Wino to Decorate Our Home" (1982) |

Shelly West singles chronology
| "Husbands and Wives" (1981) | "Another Honky-Tonk Night on Broadway" (1982) | "I Just Came Here to Dance" (1982) |

"Another Honky-Tonk Night on Broadway" is a song written by Steve Dorff, Snuff Garrett and Milton Brown, and recorded by American country music artists David Frizzell and Shelly West. It was released in February 1982 as the first single from the album The David Frizzell & Shelly West Album. The song reached #8 on the Billboard Hot Country Singles & Tracks chart.

== Charts ==
=== Weekly charts ===
| Chart (1982) | Peak position |
|---|---|
| US Hot Country Songs (Billboard) | 8 |
| Canadian RPM Country Tracks | 20 |

=== Year-end charts ===
| Chart (1982) | Position |
|---|---|
| US Hot Country Songs (Billboard) | 50 |
