= Going Where the Lonely Go =

Studio album by Merle Haggard
- Released: October 18, 1982
- Recorded: June 1982
- Studio: Britannia Studio, Hollywood, CA; Woodland Sound Studios, Nashville, TN
- Genre: Country
- Length: 35:17
- Label: Epic
- Producer: Merle Haggard, Lewis Talley

Merle Haggard chronology
A Taste of Yesterday's Wine (1982)	Going Where the Lonely Go (1982)	Goin' Home for Christmas (1982)

Singles from Going Where the Lonely Go
- 1. "Going Where the Lonely Go" Released: October 23, 1982; 2. "You Take Me for Granted" Released: March 12, 1983

Going Where the Lonely Go is the thirty-fifth studio album by American recording artist Merle Haggard backed by The Strangers, released in 1982.

== Recording and composition ==
Produced by Haggard and his mentors Fuzzy Owen and Lewis Talley, the tracks for Going Where The Lonely Go were recorded during the same two-day marathon recording session that produced the songs for Haggard's previous 1982 album Big City. Like its predecessor, it peaked at number 3 on the Billboard country albums chart. Haggard composed five of the ten songs on the LP, including the chart topping title track. The album's other #1, "You Take Me For Granted," was written as a personal statement by Haggard's wife Leona Williams about their foundering marriage, which would end in 1983. According to the liner notes for the 1994 retrospective Down Every Road written by music journalist Daniel Cooper, she wrote the song while sitting on the bus in Ohio, then played it for Merle in front of several of his friends after Merle had reduced her to tears during a duet session they were recording. "He got big old tears in his eyes," Cooper quotes Leona, "and he said, 'Is that how you feel? And I said, 'Yes, it is.'" Within days, Haggard had cut the song. Part of the problem was Williams' aspirations to be more than a backup singer and her lingering resentment over the perception by many that she had elbowed the highly respected Bonnie Owens aside. Haggard was perplexed at his wife's agitation, as he recalls in his 1981 autobiography Sing Me Back Home: "I also resented her struggle to establish her own career. After all, I could offer her a permanent place on the stage with my show. She could even have a segment all her own. What more could she want?"

Other notable cuts include "If I Had Left It Up To You" (which features the same shuffling rhythm as "Big City") and his rendition of the Willie Nelson composition "Half a Man," which he would record as a duet with Nelson on the album Pancho and Lefty. The LP also includes the melancholy "Shopping for Dresses," which Haggard wrote with Little Jimmy Dickens, and the honky-tonk nugget "Why Am I Drinkin'." Going Where the Lonely Go was reissued on CD by Epic in 1990. It contains a hidden track "Now I Know Why I'm Drinkin," and was reissued along with That's the Way Love Goes on CD by S & P Records in 2005.

== Critical reception ==
Professional ratings
Review scores
Source	Rating
AllMusic	4.5/5 stars
Robert Christgau	C+
Rolling Stone	4/5 stars

AllMusic critic Thom Jurek stated in his review: "Haggard and The Strangers were one of the tightest and most sophisticated bands in country music, inspired by the elaborate arrangements of Bob Wills' band, to the point where Haggard's music from this period transcends country music in its appeal and elegance. It's a pity this one didn't get the notice it deserved — it's a masterpiece."

== Track listing ==
All tracks composed by Merle Haggard; except where indicated:

No.	Title	Writer(s)	Length
1.	"Going Where the Lonely Go"		4:48
2.	"Why Am I Drinkin'"		2:40
3.	"If I Had Left It Up to You"		2:35
4.	"I Won't Give Up My Train"	Mark Yeary	4:33
5.	"Someday You're Gonna Need Your Friends"	Leona Williams	4:02
6.	"Shopping For Dresses"	Little Jimmy Dickens, Merle Haggard	2:35
7.	"You Take Me For Granted"	Williams	2:40
8.	"Half a Man"	Willie Nelson	4:05
9.	"For All I Know"		3:56
10.	"Nobody's Darlin' But Mine"	Jimmie Davis	3:34
11.	"Now I Know Why I'm Drinkin'"		7:47
Total length:			35:17

== Personnel ==
- Merle Haggard – vocals, guitar

The Strangers:

- Roy Nichols – guitar, harmonica
- Norm Hamlet – steel guitar, dobro
- Tiny Moore – fiddle, mandolin
- Bobby Wayne – guitar, background vocals
- Mark Yeary – piano
- Jimmy Belkin – fiddle
- Dennis Hromek – bass
- Biff Adam – drums
- Don Markham – trumpet, saxophone

with:

- Leona Williams – background vocals

== Production notes ==
- Produced by Merle Haggard & Lewis Talley

== Chart performance ==
=== Weekly charts ===
Chart (1982–1983)	Peak position
U.S. Billboard Top Country Albums	3

=== Year End Chart ===
Chart (1983)	Peak position
U.S. Billboard Top Country Albums	12

=== Charting Singles ===
Single	Chart	Position
"Going Where the Lonely Go"	Canada Country Songs (RPM)	1
"Going Where the Lonely Go"	U.S.Billboard Hot Country Songs	1
"You Take Me For Granted"	Canada Country Songs (RPM)	9
"You Take Me For Granted"	U.S.Billboard Hot Country Songs	1
