= Merle Haggard's Greatest Hits =

Greatest hits album by Merle Haggard
- Released: 1982
- Genre: Country
- Length: 29:25
- Label: MCA
- Producer: Jimmy Bowen; Fuzzy Owen; Hank Cochran; Don Gant; Merle Haggard; Ken Nelson

Merle Haggard chronology
Big City (1982)	Merle Haggard's Greatest Hits (1982)	A Taste of Yesterday's Wine (1982)

Merle Haggard's Greatest Hits is a compilation album by the American country music artist of the same name. It was released in 1982 via MCA Records.

== Track listing ==
No.	Title	Writer(s)	Length
1.	"I Think I'll Just Stay Here and Drink"	Merle Haggard	4:30
2.	"I'm Always on a Mountain When I Fall"	Chuck Howard	2:48
3.	"Red Bandana"	Haggard	2:31
4.	"The Way I Am"	Sonny Throckmorton	2:52
5.	"It's Been a Great Afternoon"	Haggard	2:13
6.	"Ramblin' Fever"	Haggard	3:14
7.	"Misery and Gin"	Snuff Garrett, John Durrill	2:45
8.	"My Own Kind of Hat"	Haggard, Red Lane	2:53
9.	"If We're Not Back in Love by Monday"	Throckmorton, Glenn Martin	3:14
10.	"Rainbow Stew"	Haggard	2:25

== Chart performance ==
Chart (1982)	Peak position
US Top Country Albums (Billboard)	37
