= You Take Me for Granted =

Single by Merle Haggard

from the album Going Where the Lonely Go
- B-side: "I Won't Give Up My Train"
- Released: March 12, 1983
- Genre: Country
- Length: 2:40
- Label: Epic
- Songwriter(s): Leona Williams
- Producer(s): Merle Haggard; Lewis Talley

Merle Haggard singles chronology
"Going Where the Lonely Go" (1982)	"You Take Me for Granted" (1983)	"Pancho and Lefty" (1983)

"You Take Me for Granted" is a song written by Leona Williams, and recorded by American country music artist Merle Haggard backed by The Strangers. It was released in March 1983 as the second single from the album Going Where the Lonely Go. The song was Haggard's twenty-ninth number one on the country chart. The single stayed at number one for one week and spent a total of thirteen weeks on the country chart.

== Cover versions ==
- The song was covered by The Forester Sisters on their 1991 album Talkin' 'Bout Men.

== Charts ==
=== Weekly charts ===
Chart (1983)	Peak position
US Hot Country Songs (Billboard)	1
Canadian RPM Country Tracks	9

=== Year-end charts ===
Chart (1983)	Position
US Hot Country Songs (Billboard)	19
