= I Just Came Here to Dance =

Single by David Frizzell and Shelly West

from the album The David Frizzell & Shelly West Album
- B-side: "Our Day Will Come"
- Released: July 17, 1982
- Genre: Country
- Length: 3:34
- Label: Warner Bros.
- Songwriter(s): Ken Bell, Terry Skinner, J. L. Wallace
- Producer(s): Snuff Garrett, Steve Dorff

David Frizzell singles chronology
"I'm Gonna Hire a Wino to Decorate Our Home" (1982)	"I Just Came Here to Dance" (1982)	"Lost My Baby Blues" (1982)

Shelly West singles chronology
"Another Honky-Tonk Night on Broadway" (1982)	"I Just Came Here to Dance" (1982)	"José Cuervo" (1983)

"I Just Came to Dance" is a song written by Ken Bell, Terry Skinner and J. L. Wallace, and recorded by American country music artists David Frizzell and Shelly West. It was released in July 1982 as the second single from the album The David Frizzell & Shelly West Album. The song reached #4 on the Billboard Hot Country Singles & Tracks chart.

In 1983, the song was covered by Roberta Flack and Peabo Bryson for their duets album, Born to Love. Released in 1984 as the album's third single, it hit #15 on Billboard's Adult Contemporary chart.

== Chart performance ==
Chart (1982)	Peak position
U.S. Billboard Hot Country Singles & Tracks	4
Canadian RPM Country Tracks	9
