= Yesterday's Wine =

Studio album by Willie Nelson
- Released: August 1971
- Recorded: May 3–4, 1971
- Studio: RCA Studio B (Nashville, Tennessee)
- Genre: Country
- Length: 29:43
- Label: RCA Victor
- Producer: Felton Jarvis

Willie Nelson chronology
Willie Nelson and Family (1971)	Yesterday's Wine (1971)	The Words Don't Fit the Picture (1972)

Yesterday's Wine is the thirteenth studio album and a concept album by country singer Willie Nelson. Nelson had been recording for RCA Victor since the early 1960s, and had released no significant hit records. By 1970, his recordings had reached mid-chart positions. Nelson lost the money he made from his song-writing royalties by financing concert tours that were generally unsuccessful and unprofitable. In addition to problems with his music career, Nelson had a troubled personal life. He had divorced his wife, Shirley Collie, and his Tennessee ranch had been destroyed by a fire.

After moving to a new home in Bandera, Texas, Nelson was called by RCA Records producer Felton Jarvis about the upcoming scheduled recording sessions. At the time, Nelson had not written any new material. He returned to Nashville, where he wrote new songs to use with others from his old repertoire. These new concept songs were recorded at the RCA studios in Nashville in just two days.

Considered one of country music's first concept albums, Yesterday's Wine is the story of the "Imperfect Man", from the moment he is born to the day of his death. RCA originally released the singles "Yesterday's Wine" and "Me and Paul". The former peaked at number 62 in Billboard's Hot Country Singles. The album failed to reach the charts, and a frustrated Nelson decided to temporarily retire from music, while still under contract to RCA Records. Later with his musical style revitalized, he returned to music in 1972.

== Background and recording ==
By the fall of 1964, Nelson had moved from Monument Records to RCA Victor, under the leadership of Chet Atkins, signing a contract for US $10,000 per year. During his first few years at RCA Victor, Nelson had no major hits, but from November, 1966 through March, 1969 his singles reached the top 25 consistently: "One In a Row" (number 19, 1966), "The Party's Over" (number 24 during a 16-week chart run in 1967), and his cover of Morecambe & Wise's "Bring Me Sunshine" (number 13, March 1969). Up to 1970, Nelson had no major success. His record and song-writing royalties were invested in concert tours that did not produce significant profits. In addition to the problems in his career, Nelson divorced Shirley Collie in 1970. In December, his ranch in Ridgetop, Tennessee was destroyed by fire. He interpreted the incident as a signal for a change. He moved to a ranch near Bandera, Texas and married Connie Koepke. In early 1971, his single "I'm a Memory" reached the top 30. Felton Jarvis contacted Nelson for the recording of his next album.

Nelson had not written any material for the sessions by the time he arrived in Nashville in April, 1971. While living in the new ranch, Nelson read the Bible, Kahlil Gibran's The Prophet, the works of Edgar Cayce and Episcopal priest A.A Taliaferro's work. Inspired by his readings, Nelson decided to work on new material. On May 1–2, he wrote nine songs, combining new ones with previous material from his repertoire, such as "Family Bible", to create the concept for the album. He recorded Yesterday's Wine in four sessions, backed by David Zettner and the studio session players, beginning with two sessions on May 3 and finishing with the last two on May 4.

In his 2015 autobiography, Nelson reminisced about this turbulent time in his life: "I looked up and simply began asking questions. Rather than keep those questions to myself, I put them into songs. The songs became my own particular prayers, my own personal reflections. I strung those prayers and reflections together in a loose-fitting suite of songs. Music critics were throwing around the term "concept album"...I guess you could say that this new notion of mine came together as a concept album. Rather than try to write a bunch of hit singles, I simply followed the natural path taken by my mind". According to Nelson's biographer, Joe Nick Patoski, the new material portrayed "an idea that was so far-out that when it came time to record in early May, 1971 producer Felton Jarvis had no choice but to let the tapes roll".

== Content ==
Family Bible
The main character remembers his childhood

"Yesterday's Wine"
In the song that names the album, "The Imperfect Man" expresses his reflections on the passage of time

"Goin' Home"
Closing the album, the song depicts the funeral of the main character

The album describes the life of a man, called "The Imperfect Man", from the beginning to the day of his death. The story begins with a dialog between two characters. The first asks the other "You do know why you're here?", and the second replies: "Yes, there's great confusion on earth, and the power that is has concluded the following: Perfect man has visited earth already and His voice was heard; The voice of imperfect man must now be made manifest; and I have been selected as the most likely candidate." This statement is followed by "Where's the Show" and "Let Me Be a Man". In the medley, Nelson depicts the birth of the character, who implores God to become a man. The song is followed by "In God's Eyes", depicting the character learning to act as a good Samaritan. In "Family Bible", the character describes his memories of and nostalgia for his childhood, the times with his family and the reading of the family Bible. "It's Not for Me to Understand" depicts the character praying, after watching a blind child listening to other children playing and finding himself unable to understand why God allowed that to happen. God replies to the Imperfect Man, "It's not for you to reason why, you too are blind without my eyes, so question not what I command". In the last stanza, the character now expresses his fear of the Lord and his reluctance to question the unfairness of the world again. The medley "These Are Difficult Times / Remember the Good Times", describes the character's bad times and his recovery by remembering the good times. "Summer of Roses" depicts the character falling in love and in the prime of his life. It is followed by the anticipation of the beginning of the end in "December Day", as the character announces "This looks like a December day. It looks like we've come to the end of the way". "Yesterday's Wine" finds the character drinking in a bar, talking to the regulars about his life, and reflecting on aging. In "Me and Paul", the Imperfect Man remembers the circumstances in which he lived with a friend in past times. The album ends with "Goin' Home", as the character watches his own funeral.

Of the writing of "December Day" and "Summer of Roses," with Nelson remembered, "I couldn't write a suite of songs, no matter how spiritual, without reference to romance," he deemed "Summer of Roses" and "December Day" "love poems. In the first song, love was fleeting, tragically brief; in the second, love was remembered..." "December Day" had been recorded previously for Nelson's 1969 LP Good Times. "Family Bible" was another old tune that Nelson, a struggling songwriter at the time, sold to Paul Buskirk for fifty dollars; Buskirk took it to Claude Gray, whose version charted at number 7 on Billboard's Hot Country Songs in 1960. A song based on his own youth, Nelson later insisted, "There could be no Yesterday's Wine without 'Family Bible.'" In his memoir Nelson wrote that "Me and Paul" was a song "that described the road that my drummer and best friend, Paul English, and I had been riding together". The cover art was designed by Hartsel Gray and the liner notes written by Dee Moeller.

== Release and reception ==
RCA Records marketing department was at a loss on how to promote Yesterday's Wine. In 2015, Nelson recalled the opinion of one of the label's executives, who told the singer "It's your fuckin' worst album to date". Nelson added that another member of the label felt that the record was "some far-out shit that maybe the hippies high on dope can understand, but the average music lover is gonna think you've lost your cotton-pickin' mind." RCA issued a single containing "Yesterday's Wine" and "Me and Paul" in October 1971. The single peaked at number 62 in Billboard's Country Singles. RCA initially pressed 10,000 copies of the album, which was released in August, 1971.

Yesterday's Wine failed to chart, and did not satisfy RCA's expectations. Discouraged by all of his failures, Nelson decided to take a hiatus from music. He later wrote in his autobiography, "I think it's one of my best albums, but Yesterday's Wine was regarded by RCA as way too spooky and far out to waste promotion money on." In 2015, he added: "I was tempted to say something, to show how the songs fit together in one cohesive story, but I stuck to my guns and stayed silent...Nashville and I had been trying damn hard but we hadn't really seen eye to eye for most of the sixties. I felt like I had shown goodwill and patience. I'd given the Music City establishment a fair chance. After Yesterday's Wine, I cut other albums for RCA, but the story was always the same. The sales were slow and the producers lukewarm about my output. My career had stalled." The album was later considered one of the first concept albums in country music. Meanwhile, author Michael Streissguth felt that Yesterday's Wine "tried to be a concept album, but it lacked a clear thread, despite Willie's claim to the contrary."

Nelson moved to Austin, Texas and returned to music in the following year. He formed a new band and performed in local venues, as his act was rejuvenated by the burgeoning hippie scene of the city.

Yesterday's Wine was reissued on CD in 1997 by Justice records, and then by RCA/BMG Heritage in 2003. In 2017, RCA Victor reissued again the album on LP and digital download.

=== Original reviews ===
Professional ratings
Review scores
Source	Rating
Robert Christgau	B+
Dayton Daily News	A

Music critic Robert Christgau gave the album a B+. Christgau observed: "The great Nashville songsmith has never bowled anyone over with his singing, and here he finds the concept to match." The Reviewer felt that the "religious themes" present in the songs "tends to limit their general relevance." Nathan Bush described Yesterday's Wine for The New York Times as "the last and best of [Nelson's] Nashville albums", saying that it was "Organized in the manner of an epic poem, each cut a metaphor in the journey through life ... it was Nashville's first fully conceived concept album, and nobody knew what to make of it. It soon disappeared quietly and utterly." Rolling Stone wrote: "[Yesterdays Wine] is the first of his bold, conceptual departures from country's hits-plus-filler norm. Rather than tack rock guitar riffs onto modern honky-tonk sagas, Nelson absorbed the innovations of Bob Dylan and the singer-songwriters into his own distinct style. Even if the narrative concepts don't always hold together, Willie hangs his most ambitious albums on some of his catchiest tunes."

The Fort Worth Star-Telegram welcomed it as "the usual heady stuff expected from this unique song stylist." The Dayton Daily News gave it an A. The reviewer considered it "the most touching piece" that he "came across in many years". San Antonio Express-News considered that Nelson's "tearful voice" did "an excellent job in getting the message driven across in a collection of soft ballads". The review described Nelson's songwriting as "deft of handling meaningful words" in "Family Bible", and his "mastery of the lyrics" on "Summer of Roses" and "December Day". The piece concluded that it represented "a showcase for Nelson's talents" and that it was "worthy of general listening, and listening again".

=== Retrospective reviews ===
Professional ratings
Review scores
Source	Rating
AllMusic	5/5 stars

AllMusic gave Yesterday's Wine five stars out of five. Critic Nathan Bush compared it to Nelson's subsequent album Red Headed Stranger, suggesting that while the story on Yesterday's Wine "isn't as tightly constructed", it gave the album "a feeling of malleability that adds to its power". Bush concluded that "Yesterday's Wine provides further insight into the development of his art during this prolific period."

In their book, The Listener's Guide to Country Music, Robert Oermann and Douglas B. Green compared the album with Nelson's later recordings for Columbia Records: "All of those are beautiful records. They're all on Columbia and are made just the way Willie wanted them. It was not always so at his previous record label, RCA. Nevertheless, he made a few landmark recordings while he was with that company ... Few of the songs on Yesterday's Wine are well-known Nelson compositions, but all are minor masterpieces".

== Release history ==
Upon original release, this was issued on LP only. But after Nelson began seeing major success in 1975, RCA reissued "Yesterday's Wine" as part of its "Pure Gold" reissue series. This time, RCA issued 8-track and cassette copies of the album. The album was reissued again in 1980, as part of RCA's "Best Buy" series. It was also around this time that the album was issued in Great Britain for the first time.

In 2016, German reissue label Speakers Corner reissued this album for the European market. The following year, US reissue label Friday Music reissued the album on burgundy-colored vinyl.

"Yesterday's Wine" has been reissued on CD numerous times; in 1997 by Justice Records, a Houston, Texas–based independent label, and in 2003 by BMG Heritage. In 2010, Sony reissued Yesterday's Wine as part of a triple disc boxed set, along with Red Headed Stranger and Stardust.

== Track listing ==
All tracks were composed by Willie Nelson; except where indicated

Side one
No.	Title	Length
1.	"Intro: Willie Nelson and Band" / "Medley: Where's the Show; Let Me Be a Man"	3:41
2.	"In God's Eyes"	2:23
3.	"Family Bible" (Claude Gray, Paul Buskirk, Walter Breeland)	3:12
4.	"It's Not for Me to Understand"	3:06
5.	"Medley: These Are Difficult Times" / "Remember the Good Times"	3:17

Side two
No.	Title	Length
1.	"Summer of Roses"	2:05
2.	"December Day"	2:19
3.	"Yesterday's Wine"	3:15
4.	"Me and Paul"	3:50
5.	"Goin' Home"	3:06

== Personnel ==
Musicians

- Willie Nelson – vocals, guitar
- William Paul Ackerman – drums
- Jerry Carrigan – drums
- Roy M. "Junior" Huskey – bass guitar
- Dave Kirby – guitar
- Charlie McCoy – harmonica
- Weldon Myrick – steel guitar
- Hargus "Pig" Robbins – organ, piano
- Jerry Dean Smith – piano
- Buddy Spicher – fiddle
- Bobby Thompson – banjo
- Herman Wade, Jr. – guitar
- Chip Young – guitar
- Dave Zettner – guitar

Studio

- Felton Jarvis – Producer
- Vic Anesini – Mastering
- Steven Bernstein – Design
- Gretchen Brennison – Production Assistant
- Jeremy Holiday – Production Assistant
- John Hudson – Product Manager
- Al Pachucki – Engineer
- Mike Shockley – Recording Technician
- Roy Shockley – Recording Technician
- Hartsel Gray – cover illustration

== Chart positions ==
Sales chart performance of singles from Yesterday's Wine
Song	Chart (1971)	Peak
"Yesterday's Wine"	US Hot Country Songs (Billboard)	62
