= My Favorite Memory =

Single by Merle Haggard

from the album Big City
- B-side: "Texas Fiddle Song"
- Released: September 19, 1981
- Genre: Country
- Length: 3:06
- Label: Epic
- Songwriter(s): Merle Haggard
- Producer(s): Merle Haggard

Merle Haggard singles chronology
"Rainbow Stew" (1981)	"My Favorite Memory" (1981)	"Big City" (1981)

"My Favorite Memory" is a song written and recorded by American country music artist Merle Haggard, his twenty-fifth number-one single. It was released in September 1981 as the first single from the album Big City. The single stayed at number one for one week and spent a total of ten weeks on the country chart.

== Charts ==
Chart (1981)	Peak position
US Hot Country Songs (Billboard)	1
Canadian RPM Country Tracks	3
