= Are the Good Times Really Over (I Wish a Buck Was Still Silver) =

Single by Merle Haggard

from the album Big City
- B-side: "I Always Get Lucky with You"
- Released: May 15, 1982
- Genre: Country
- Length: 4:14
- Label: Epic
- Songwriter: Merle Haggard
- Producer: Merle Haggard

Merle Haggard singles chronology
"Big City" (1981)	"Are the Good Times Really Over (I Wish a Buck Was Still Silver)" (1982)	"Going Where the Lonely Go" (1982)

"Are the Good Times Really Over (I Wish a Buck Was Still Silver)" is a song written and recorded by American country music artist Merle Haggard, backed by The Strangers. It was released in May 1982 as the third single from his album Big City. The song reached #2 on the Billboard Hot Country Singles chart and #1 on the RPM Country Tracks chart in Canada.

== Content ==
The theme of the song is the concern over seemingly irreversible moral decay. It features a wide range of references including pop culture topics such as The Beatles and Elvis; American companies like Ford, Chevy, and Coca-Cola; political topics including the Vietnam War and presidency of Richard Nixon, as well as social commentary on modern men's work ethic, and women's lack of skill and willingness to cook.

The song ends much more positive nod to the future, declaring that the best of the free life is still yet to come and that the good times aren’t over.

== Charts ==
=== Weekly charts ===
Chart (1982)	Peak position
US Hot Country Songs (Billboard)	2
Canadian RPM Country Tracks	1

=== Year-end charts ===
Chart (1982)	Position
US Hot Country Songs (Billboard)	27
