= Lost My Baby Blues =

Single by David Frizzell

from the album The Family's Fine, But This One's All Mine
- B-side: "Single and Alone"
- Released: October 9, 1982
- Genre: Country
- Length: 3:22
- Label: Warner Bros.
- Songwriter(s): Ben Peters
- Producer(s): Snuff Garrett, Steve Dorff

David Frizzell singles chronology
"I Just Came Here to Dance" (1982)	"Lost My Baby Blues" (1982)	"Where Are You Spending Nights These Days" (1983)

"Lost My Baby Blues" is a song written by Ben Peters, and recorded by American country music artist David Frizzell. It was released in October 1982 as the second single from the album The Family's Fine, But This One's All Mine. The song reached #5 on the Billboard Hot Country Singles & Tracks chart.

== Chart performance ==
Chart (1982–1983)	Peak position
US Hot Country Songs (Billboard)	5
Canadian RPM Country Tracks	5
