= I'm Gonna Hire a Wino to Decorate Our Home =

Single by David Frizzell

from the album The Family's Fine, But This One's All Mine
- B-side: "She's Up to All Her Old Tricks Again"
- Released: April 1982
- Genre: Country
- Length: 4:00
- Label: Viva
- Songwriter: Dewayne Blackwell
- Producers: Snuff Garrett, Steve Dorff

David Frizzell singles chronology
"Another Honky-Tonk Night on Broadway" (1982)	"I'm Gonna Hire a Wino to Decorate Our Home" (1982)	"I Just Came Here to Dance" (1982)

"I'm Gonna Hire a Wino to Decorate Our Home" is a song written by Dewayne Blackwell, and recorded by American country music artist David Frizzell. It was released in April 1982 as the first single from the album The Family's Fine, But This One's All Mine. The song was Frizzell's only number one on the country chart as a solo artist. The single went to number one for one week and spent a total of 14 weeks in country music's top 40.

Along with reaching No. 3 on the magazine's Top Country Tracks chart, the song unexpectedly became a mainstream pop hit in Canada, peaking at No. 20 on the RPM Top Singles chart.

== Content ==
The song talks of a wife who grows tired of her husband's barhopping (and spending his entire paycheck doing so). She then comes up with a unique plan – she decides to redecorate their house into a bar, and play the part of bartender/waitress as an inducement to get her husband to stay at home (and possibly bring his friends along with him, so they can spend their paychecks). While he recovers from his hangover the following morning, she will deposit the proceeds in their bank account.

== Charts ==
=== Weekly charts ===
Chart (1982)	Peak position
US Hot Country Songs (Billboard)	1
Canadian RPM Country Tracks	3
Canadian RPM Top Singles	20
Chart (1983)	Peak position
Australian (Kent Music Report)	99

=== Year-end charts ===
Chart (1982)	Position
US Hot Country Songs (Billboard)	5
