= Flight 309 to Tennessee =

Single by Shelly West

from the album West by West
- B-side: "Sexy Song"
- Released: July 2, 1983
- Genre: Country
- Length: 3:27
- Label: Viva
- Songwriter(s): Ronnie Scott
- Producer(s): Snuff Garrett, Steve Dorff

Shelly West singles chronology
"José Cuervo" (1983)	"Flight 309 to Tennessee" (1983)	"Another Motel Memory" (1983)

"Flight 309 to Tennessee" is a song written by Ronnie Scott, and made famous by American country music artist Shelly West. It originally charted at #36 in 1974 on the Billboard Easy Listening chart for Vicki Britton, a Dallas-based singer/songwriter on Bell Records. Shelly's cover was released in July 1983 as the second single from the album West by West. The song reached #4 on the Billboard Hot Country Singles & Tracks chart.

== Chart performance ==
Chart (1983)	Peak position
US Hot Country Songs (Billboard)	4
Canadian RPM Country Tracks	11

== Other versions ==
- Beverly Bremers released a version of the song as a single in November 1976.
