= Old Flame (Alabama song) =

Single by Alabama

from the album Feels So Right
- B-side: "I'm Stoned"
- Released: January 23, 1981 (U.S.)
- Recorded: December 14, 1980
- Genre: Neotraditional country
- Length: 3:13
- Label: RCA Nashville 12169
- Songwriters: Donny Lowery, Mac McAnally
- Producers: Harold Shedd and Alabama

Alabama singles chronology
"Why Lady Why" (1980)	"Old Flame" (1981)	"Feels So Right" (1981)

"Old Flame" is a song written by Donny Lowery and Mac McAnally, and recorded by American country music band Alabama. It was released in January 1981 as the first single from the album Feels So Right. The song was the group's third number-one single on the Billboard Hot Country Singles chart.

== Critical reception ==
According to Allmusic reviewer Al Campbell, it represented a traditional side to Alabama's repertoire.

== In popular culture ==
The song is played on the FX series, The Americans; Season 5, Episode 3 ("The Midges").

== Charts ==
Chart (1981)	Peak position
Canadian RPM Country Tracks	1
US Hot Country Songs (Billboard)	1
US Bubbling Under Hot 100 (Billboard)	103
