= Love in the First Degree (Alabama song) =

Single by Alabama

from the album Feels So Right
- B-side: "Ride the Train"
- Released: October 2, 1981 (U.S.)
- Recorded: August 30, 1980
- Length: 3:19
- Label: RCA Nashville 12288
- Songwriters: Tim DuBois, Jim Hurt
- Producers: Harold Shedd and Alabama

Alabama singles chronology
"Feels So Right" (1981)	"Love in the First Degree" (1981)	"Mountain Music" (1982)

"Love in the First Degree" is a song written by Jim Hurt and Tim DuBois, and recorded by American country music band Alabama. It was released in October 1981 as the third single from the band's album Feels So Right. It became the group's fifth straight No. 1 single (and second multi-week No. 1) on the Billboard magazine Hot Country Singles chart.

"Love in the First Degree" became Alabama's biggest crossover hit, peaking at No. 15 on the Billboard Hot 100 in early 1982.

== Content ==
The song, a mid-tempoed song with a strong country beat, uses the analogy of being found guilty of a crime (this time, of love) and the perpetrator throwing himself on the mercy of the object of his affection.

== Cover versions ==
Country music singer Jason Aldean covered the song from the television special CMT Giants: Alabama. Country music singer Luke Bryan covered the song from the album Alabama & Friends.

== Charts ==
Chart (1981–1982)	Peak position
US Billboard Hot 100	15
US Adult Contemporary (Billboard)	5
US Hot Country Songs (Billboard)	1
Canadian RPM Adult Contemporary Tracks	1
Canadian RPM Country Tracks	1

Year-end chart (1982)	Rank
US Top Pop Singles (Billboard)	55
