= Big City (Merle Haggard song) =

Single by Merle Haggard

from the album Big City
- B-side: "I Think I'm Gonna Live Forever"
- Released: January 11, 1982
- Recorded: July 1981
- Genre: Country
- Length: 2:59
- Label: Epic
- Songwriter(s): Merle Haggard and Dean Holloway
- Producer(s): Merle Haggard

Merle Haggard singles chronology
"My Favorite Memory" (1981)	"Big City" (1982)	"Are the Good Times Really Over (I Wish a Buck Was Still Silver)" (1982)

"Big City" is a song recorded by American country music singer Merle Haggard backed by The Strangers. Co-written by Haggard and Dean Holloway, the song was released in January 1982 as the second single and title track from his album Big City. In April, the song was his 27th number-one single on the Billboard Hot Country Singles chart.

== Production ==
The song was inspired by a remark by Dean Holloway, Haggard's lifelong friend and tour bus driver. At the end of a packed two-day recording session at Britannia Studios in Los Angeles, Haggard went to the bus to check on Holloway, who had been minding the bus, and asked him how he was doing. Holloway responded, "I hate this place. I'm tired of this dirty old city." Haggard immediately saw inspiration, and began writing the song, based on Holloway's remark, on a nearby pad of paper. "I'm tired of this dirty old city" became the song's first line. Haggard decided that the chorus should include the narrator talking about moving elsewhere, and asked Holloway where he would rather be, to which Holloway responded, "If it were up to me, it'd be somewhere in the middle of damn Montana." "Somewhere in the middle of Montana" became part of the chorus. Haggard rushed back into the studio, where the band was packing up, and told them to unpack their instruments in order to record one last song; the band recorded the song in one take, with no rehearsal.

Haggard credited Holloway as a co-writer, entitling him to half the royalties for the song, which amounted to around half a million dollars for Holloway.

== Critical reception ==
Haggard's 1981 album Big City was described by Allmusic critic, Thom Jurek, as "a collection of songs focused on the themes of freedom from urban life." The album's title track was the centerpiece of the album's recurring theme. The song, wrote Jurek, "revisits the seemingly eternal themes in Haggard's best work — the plight of the honest, decent working man amid the squalor, complication, and contradiction of urban life."

== Soundtrack appearances ==
"Big City" is playing in the background at a bar during the opening scene to the 1996 film Fargo.

== Charts ==
=== Weekly charts ===
Chart (1982)	Peak position
US Hot Country Songs (Billboard)	1
Canadian RPM Country Tracks	1

=== Year-end charts ===
Chart (1982)	Position
US Hot Country Songs (Billboard)	13
