= Feels So Right (song) =

Single by Alabama

from the album Feels So Right
- B-side: "See the Embers, Feel the Flame"
- Released: May 1, 1981 (U.S.)
- Recorded: August 26, 1980
- Genre: Country
- Length: 3:36; 3:21 (7")
- Label: RCA Nashville 12236
- Songwriter(s): Randy Owen
- Producer(s): Harold Shedd and Alabama

Alabama singles chronology
"Old Flame" (1981)	"Feels So Right" (1981)	"Love in the First Degree" (1981)

"Feels So Right" is a song written by Randy Owen, and recorded by American country music band Alabama. It was released in May 1981 as the second single and title track from the band's album Feels So Right. It was the group's fourth straight No. 1 single (and first multi-week No. 1) on the Billboard magazine Hot Country Singles chart.

"Feel So Right" was covered by Clay Walker as a duet with Randy Owen on his 2010 album She Won't Be Lonely Long.

== Content ==
A mellow love song with sensuous and somewhat explicit lyrics and a strong country pop styling, "Feels So Right" was also Alabama's first crossover hit, performing modestly well on CHR and Top 40 radio stations. The song peaked at No. 20 on the Billboard Hot 100 in the summer of 1981, and became their first of five top 10 hits on the adult contemporary chart. On the country chart, the song has the distinction of becoming the first No. 1 song to drop directly out of the top 40 since the inception of the 100-position chart, falling to No. 43 for the chart week of August 1, 1981.

The pop "love ballad" style evident on "Feels So Right," along with the country rock style of its other songs, became the cornerstone of Alabama's sound throughout the 1980s and 1990s. Today, it remains one of Alabama's most popular songs.

== Cover versions ==
Country music singer Pam Tillis and Lorrie Morgan covered the song from the television special CMT Giants: Alabama.

== Single and album edits ==
A slightly early fade on the single version is the only difference between the single and album versions of "Feels So Right".

== Chart performance ==
Chart (1981)	Peak position
US Hot Country Songs (Billboard)	1
US Billboard Hot 100	20
Canadian RPM Country Tracks	5
Canadian RPM Adult Contemporary Tracks	1
UK Singles (OCC)	91

Year-end chart (1981)	Rank
US Top Pop Singles (Billboard)	77

== Certifications ==
Certifications for Feels So Right
Region	Certification	Certified units/sales
United States (RIAA)	Gold	500,000^{‡}
^{‡} Sales+streaming figures based on certification alone.
