= Big City (Merle Haggard album) =

Studio album by Merle Haggard
- Released: October 1981
- Recorded: July 1981
- Studios: Britannia, Hollywood, California
- Genre: Country
- Length: 28:59
- Label: Epic
- Producer: Merle Haggard

Merle Haggard chronology
| Songs for the Mama That Tried (1981) | Big City (1981) | Merle Haggard's Greatest Hits (1982) |

Singles from Big City
- 1. "My Favorite Memory" Released: 1981; 2. "Big City" Released: January 11, 1982; 3. "Are the Good Times Really Over (I Wish a Buck Was Still Silver)" Released: May 15, 1982

Big City is the thirty-third studio album by American country music artist Merle Haggard backed by the Strangers, released in 1981. It was his debut on the Epic label after ending his association with MCA. Big City peaked at number three on the Billboard Country Album charts and number 161 on the Pop Album charts. It is an RIAA-certified Gold album.

Iris Dement is among the many musicians who have covered the title track.

== Background ==
After five years at MCA Records, Haggard jumped to Epic in 1982, and the move appeared to spark his creativity; he wrote or co-wrote eight of the LP's twelve tracks, including its two #1 singles, "Big City" and "My Favorite Memory." Haggard entered the studio with his band the Strangers and his mentor Lewis Talley and, in a two-day marathon recording session, produced enough songs for this release, plus Haggard’s 1982 LP, Going Where the Lonely Go. Many of the songs on Big City explore the struggle of the working man amid the complexities and challenges of urban life and aging.

The other single release, “Are the Good Times Really Over (I Wish a Buck Was Still Silver),” peaked at number two on the Billboard Hot Country Singles chart and also won the Academy of Country Music 1982 Song of the Year.

Big City also contains a rerecording of "You Don't Have Very Far to Go," which had originally appeared on Haggard's 1967 album Branded Man. "I Always Get Lucky With You" was later recorded by Haggard's friend George Jones for his 1983 album Shine On and became his last #1 single.

The CD reissue of Big City features two bonus tracks: "I Won't Give Up My Train," a duet with Roger Miller, and the uncredited "Call Me."

== Critical reception ==
Professional ratings
Review scores
| Source | Rating |
|---|---|
| AllMusic | 5/5 stars |
| Robert Christgau | B |
| The Rolling Stone Album Guide | 3/5 stars |

Thom Jurek of AllMusic believes the album "stands among his finest—and most lasting—recordings," adding, "Big City, both the cut and the album, revisits the seemingly eternal themes in Haggard's best work—the plight of the honest, decent working man amid the squalor, complication, and contradiction of urban life." Music critic Robert Christgau wrote "This isn't just for his cult—it's for the whole damn country audience... you can only tell how much filler there is by listening till you're sick of it."

== Track listing ==
All tracks composed by Merle Haggard, except where indicated

| No. | Title | Writer(s) | Length |
|---|---|---|---|
| 1. | "Big City" | Merle Haggard, Dean Holloway | 2:59 |
| 2. | "My Favorite Memory" | | 3:06 |
| 3. | "Good Old American Guest" | | 2:36 |
| 4. | "I Think I'm Gonna Live Forever" | Benny Binion, Haggard, Dennis Hromek | 2:29 |
| 5. | "This Song Is Mine" | | 2:33 |
| 6. | "Stop the World and Let Me Off" | music: Carl Belew; lyrics: W.S. Stevenson | 3:18 |
| 7. | "Are the Good Times Really Over (I Wish a Buck Was Still Silver)" | | 4:14 |
| 8. | "Texas Fiddle Song" | Leona Williams, Ron Williams | 2:19 |
| 9. | "You Don't Have Very Far to Go" | Haggard, Red Simpson | 3:14 |
| 10. | "I Always Get Lucky with You" | Gary Church, Haggard, Freddy Powers, Tex Whitson | 3:31 |
| Total length: | | | 28:59 |

== Personnel ==
- Merle Haggard – vocals, guitar

The Strangers:

- Roy Nichols – guitar, harmonica
- Norm Hamlet – steel guitar, dobro
- Tiny Moore – fiddle, mandolin
- Bobby Wayne – rhythm guitar, backing vocals
- Mark Yeary – piano
- Jimmy Belken – fiddle
- Dennis Hromek – bass
- Biff Adam – drums
- Don Markham – trumpet, saxophone

with:

- Leona Williams – backing vocals

and:

- Slyde Hyde – trombone, euphonium

Production

- Produced by Merle Haggard
- Engineered by Lewis Talley
- Mastered by Chris Athens
- Cover Photography by Norman Seeff

== Charts ==
=== Weekly charts ===
| Chart (1981–1982) | Peak position |
|---|---|
| US Billboard 200 | 161 |
| US Top Country Albums (Billboard) | 3 |

=== Year-end charts ===
| Chart (1982) | Position |
|---|---|
| US Top Country Albums (Billboard) | 5 |
| Chart (1983) | Position |
| US Top Country Albums (Billboard) | 48 |

=== Singles ===
| Single | Chart | Position |
|---|---|---|
| "My Favorite Memory" | Canada Country Songs (RPM) | 3 |
| "My Favorite Memory" | U.S.Billboard Hot Country Songs | 1 |
| "Big City" | Canada Country Songs (RPM) | 1 |
| "Big City" | U.S.Billboard Hot Country Songs | 1 |
| "Are the Good Times Really Over (I Wish a Buck Was Still Silver)" | Canada Country Songs (RPM) | 1 |
| "Are the Good Times Really Over (I Wish a Buck Was Still Silver)" | U.S.Billboard Hot Country Songs | 2 |
