= You're the Reason God Made Oklahoma =

Single by David Frizzell and Shelly West

from the album The Sound Track Music From Clint Eastwood's Any Which Way You Can
- B-side: "That's Where Lovers Go Wrong"
- Released: January 1981
- Genre: Country
- Length: 3:24
- Label: Warner Bros. Records
- Songwriters: Felice and Boudleaux Bryant; Larry Collins; Sandy Pinkard
- Producers: Snuff Garrett; Steve Dorff

David Frizzell and Shelly West singles chronology
"You're the Reason God Made Oklahoma" (1981)	"A Texas State of Mind" (1981)

"You're the Reason God Made Oklahoma" is a song from the film Any Which Way You Can, performed by American country music artists David Frizzell and Shelly West. It was written by Larry Collins and Sandy Pinkard (of Pinkard & Bowden). The song was West's debut on the country chart and Frizzell's second hit on the country chart. "You're the Reason God Made Oklahoma" was the most successful of seven country hits by the duo, staying number one on the country chart for one week and 11 weeks in the Top 40 country chart.

Felice and Boudleaux Bryant sued Collins and Pinkard for copyright infringement because the tune was similar to their song "Rocky Top." They won the lawsuit and are now often credited as having co-written the song.

== Charts ==
Chart (1981)	Peak position
U.S. Billboard Hot Country Singles	1
Canadian RPM Country Tracks	13
