= Shelly West =

American country music singer (born 1958)

- Born: May 23, 1958 (age 68); Cleveland, Ohio, U.S.
- Genres: Country pop
- Occupation: Singer
- Instrument: Vocals
- Years active: 1981–1992; 2012–present
- Labels: K-tel; Warner Bros.; Viva; Varèse Sarabande
- Spouse(s): Allen Frizzell (m. 1977-1985); Garry Hood (m. 1985-2000)

Shelly West (born May 23, 1958) is an American country music singer. Her mother was the country music star Dottie West, whose career spanned three decades. The younger West reached her peak in popularity during the 1980s before mostly retiring in the wake of her mother's death.

== Biography ==
=== Early life ===
West was born in Cleveland, Ohio, on May 23, 1958.

=== 1981–1987 ===
West's career coincided with her mother Dottie's reinvention of herself as a country pop star. Shelly West is best known for her hit duets with David Frizzell, especially their number-one hit "You're the Reason God Made Oklahoma". At the time of that song's release she was married to Allen Frizzell 1981-1983, the younger brother of her duet partner. West was also a successful solo artist, having her own number-one hit, "José Cuervo" in 1983. West was married to Garry Hood between 1985 and 2000.

=== 1987–1992: Retirement ===
West did reunite with Frizzell for a few shows in the late 1980s. West married Garry Hood in 1985 and had twin sons. In 1990, Shelly toured with her mother, Dottie; together, they were popular on the road. On August 30, 1991, Dottie was involved in a major car accident, eventually dying five days later, on September 4, 1991, from injuries sustained in the accident. West was a technical adviser for a television biopic about her mother's life, Big Dreams and Broken Hearts: The Dottie West Story, produced by and starring actress Michele Lee. At that point, amid major changes in the country music industry that impacted the careers of many established country stars, the younger West retired to focus on her family.

=== Post-retirement ===
In June 2005, CMT honored Shelly and her duet partner, David Frizzell, when they were voted number six on its 100 Greatest Duets Special. Although they did not perform any songs, Shelly West and David Frizzell appeared on the special, for which West was interviewed. West appeared on numerous episodes of Country Family Reunion on RFD-TV.

West has returned to performing occasionally since 2012. She reunited with David Frizzell for two shows on October 13, 2012, at the God and Country Theater in Branson, Missouri. The duo played another show on November 2, 2013 at the Americana Theater in Branson.

== Discography ==
=== Studio albums ===
Title	Album details	Peak positions
Title	Album details	US Country
Carryin' On the Family Names (with David Frizzell)	Release date: April 1981; Label: Warner Bros. Records	6
The David Frizzell & Shelly West Album (with David Frizzell)	Release date: January 1982; Label: Viva Records	8
Our Best to You (with David Frizzell)	Release date: November 1982; Label: Viva Records	24
West by West	Release date: March 1983; Label: Viva Records	6
Red Hot	Release date: November 1983; Label: Viva Records	26
In Session (with David Frizzell)	Release date: December 1983; Label: Viva Records	33
Don't Make Me Wait on the Moon	Release date: December 1984; Label: Viva Records	28

=== Compilations ===
Title	Album details	Peak positions
Title	Album details	US Country
Golden Duets (The Best of Frizzell & West) (with David Frizzell)	Release date: August 1984; Label: Viva Records	45
Greatest Hits: Alone & Together (with David Frizzell)	Release date: November 17, 1994; Label: K-tel	—
The Very Best of David Frizzell & Shelly West (with David Frizzell)	Release date: June 23, 2009; Label: Varèse Sarabande	—
The Very Best of Shelly West	Release date: November 10, 2009; Label: Varèse Sarabande	—
"—" denotes releases that did not chart

=== Singles ===
Year	Title	Peak positions		Album
Year	Title	US Country	CAN Country	Album
1983	"José Cuervo"	1	1	West by West
1983	"Flight 309 to Tennessee"	4	8	West by West
1983	"Another Motel Memory"	10	20	Red Hot
1984	"Now I Lay Me Down to Cheat"	56	—	Red Hot
1984	"Somebody Buy This Cowgirl a Beer"	34	—	Red Hot
1984	"Now There's You"	21	22	Don't Make Me Wait on the Moon
1985	"Don't Make Me Wait on the Moon"	46	—	Don't Make Me Wait on the Moon
1985	"I'll Dance the Two Step"	64	—	Don't Make Me Wait on the Moon
1985	"If I Could Sing Something in Spanish"	—	—	Don't Make Me Wait on the Moon
1986	"What Would You Do"	54	—	—N/a
1986	"Love Don't Come Any Better Than This"	55	—	—N/a
"—" denotes releases that did not chart

=== Singles with David Frizzell ===
Year	Title	Peak positions		Album
Year	Title	US Country	CAN Country	Album
1981	"You're the Reason God Made Oklahoma"	1	13	Carryin' on the Family Names
1981	"A Texas State of Mind"	9	—	Carryin' on the Family Names
1981	"Husbands and Wives"	16	38	Carryin' on the Family Names
1982	"Another Honky-Tonk Night on Broadway"	8	20	The David Frizzell & Shelly West Album
1982	"I Just Came Here to Dance"	4	9	The David Frizzell & Shelly West Album
1982	"Please Surrender"	43	—	Our Best to You
1983	"Cajun Invitation"	52	—	Our Best to You
1983	"Pleasure Island"	71	—	In Session
1984	"Silent Partners"	20	20	In Session
1984	"It's a Be Together Night"	13	40	Golden Duets (The Best of Frizzell & West)
1985	"Do Me Right"	60	—	Golden Duets (The Best of Frizzell & West)
"—" denotes releases that did not chart

== Awards ==
Year	Award	Award Program
1980	Academy of Country Music Awards	Top Vocal Duo of the Year; (w/ David Frizzell)
1981	Academy of Country Music Awards	Song of the Year; "You're the Reason God Made Oklahoma"
1982	Academy of Country Music Awards	Top Vocal Duo of the Year; (w/ David Frizzell)
1982	Country Music Association Awards	Vocal Duo of the Year; (w/ David Frizzell)
1982	Music City News Country	Vocal Duet of the Year; (w/ David Frizzell)
1983	Music City News Country	Most Promising Female Artist of the Year
1983	Music City News Country	Vocal Duet of the Year; (w/ David Frizzell)

== See also ==
- Dottie West (1932–1991; West's mother)
- David Frizzell (West's duet partner)
