= Feels So Right =

1981 album by Alabama

Studio album by Alabama
- Released: February 1981; July 7, 1987 (re-release)
- Recorded: 1980
- Studio: The Music Mill, Nashville, TN
- Genre: Country
- Length: 34:59
- Label: RCA Nashville
- Producer: Alabama; Larry McBride; Harold Shedd

Alabama chronology
My Home's In Alabama (1980)	Feels So Right (1981)	Mountain Music (1982)

Singles from Feels So Right
- 1. "Old Flame" Released: January 23, 1981; 2. "Feels So Right" Released: May 1, 1981; 3. "Love in the First Degree" Released: October 2, 1981

Professional ratings
Review scores
Source	Rating
Allmusic	4/5 stars

Feels So Right is the fifth studio album by American country music band Alabama, released in February 1981 by RCA Nashville. It was their first #1 on the Billboard Top Country Albums chart. On the all-genre Billboard 200 the album peaked at #16 and stayed for more than three years, longer than any other Alabama album. This was the last album to be co-produced by Larry McBride, who had discovered the band and later suffered a heart attack and died in 1991.

Feels So Right produced three Number One hits on the Billboard Hot Country Singles chart: "Old Flame", the title track and "Love in the First Degree". The latter two also reached the Top 20 of the Billboard Hot 100. The album was certified quadruple platinum by the Recording Industry Association of America.

== Track listing ==
No.	Title	Writer(s)	Lead singer	Length
1.	"Feels So Right"	Randy Owen	Randy Owen	3:37
2.	"Love in the First Degree"	Tim DuBois, Jim Hurt	Randy Owen	3:19
3.	"Burn Georgia Burn"	Tim Lewis, Roger Murrah	Teddy Gentry	3:31
4.	"Ride the Train"	Teddy Gentry	Randy Owen	3:46
5.	"Fantasy"	Jeff Cook, Teddy Gentry, Owen, Rick Scott	Randy Owen	4:03
6.	"Hollywood"	Gary Stewart, Wayne Carson	Randy Owen	3:52
7.	"Old Flame"	Donny Lowery, Mac McAnally	Randy Owen	3:13
8.	"Woman Back Home"	Lowery	Randy Owen	2:21
9.	"See the Embers, Feel the Flame"	Cook	Jeff Cook	2:43
10.	"I'm Stoned"	Owen, Gentry	Randy Owen	4:53

=== Notes ===
- "Burn Georgia Burn" is listed as "Burn Georgia Down" on the CD release.

== Personnel ==
=== Alabama ===
- Randy Owen - lead vocals, rhythm guitar
- Teddy Gentry - vocals, bass guitar, lead vocals on "Burn Georgia Burn"
- Jeff Cook - vocals, lead guitar, lead vocals on "See the Embers, Feel the Flame"
- Mark Herndon - drums

=== Other musicians ===
- Rick Scott - drums
- Arliss Scott - guitars
- Jack Eubanks - guitars
- David Humphreys - drums
- Leo Jackson - guitar
- Fred Newell - guitar
- Willie Rainsford - keyboards
- Billy Reynolds - guitar
- David Smith - bass guitar
- Strings arranged by Kristin Wilkinson

== Production ==
- Produced by Alabama, Harold Shedd and Larry McBride
- Engineers: Jim Cotton, Gene Rice, Harold Shedd
- Assistant engineers: Paul Goldberg, Ben Hall, Joe Mills
- Mastering: Randy Kling

== Chart performance ==
=== Album ===
Chart (1981)	Peak position
U.S. Billboard Top Country Albums	1
U.S. Billboard 200	16

Year End Chart (1981)	Peak position
U.S. Billboard Top Country Albums	3
U.S. Billboard 200	25

Year End Chart (1982)	Peak position
U.S. Billboard Top Country Albums	2
U.S. Billboard 200	18

=== Singles ===
Year	Single	Peak chart positions				
Year	Single	US Country	US	US AC	CAN Country	CAN AC
1981	"Old Flame"	1	103	—	1	—
1981	"Feels So Right"	1	20	—	5	1
1981	"Love in the First Degree"	1	15	5	1	1

=== Certifications ===
Region	Certification	Certified units/sales
United States (RIAA)	4× Platinum	4,000,000^{^}
^{^} Shipments figures based on certification alone.
