= Going Where the Lonely Go (song) =

Single by Merle Haggard

from the album Going Where the Lonely Go
- B-side: "Some Day You're Going to Need Your Friends"
- Released: October 23, 1982
- Genre: Country
- Length: 4:48
- Label: Epic
- Songwriter(s): Merle Haggard
- Producer(s): Merle Haggard; Lewis Talley

Merle Haggard singles chronology
| "Yesterday's Wine" (1982) | "Going Where the Lonely Go" (1982) | "You Take Me for Granted" (1983) |

"Going Where the Lonely Go" is a song written and recorded by American country music artist Merle Haggard backed by The Strangers. It was released in October 1982 as the first single and title track from the album Going Where the Lonely Go. The song was his twenty-eighth number one country single. The single went to number one for one week and spent a total of thirteen weeks on the country chart.

== Personnel ==
- Merle Haggard– vocals, guitar

The Strangers:

- Roy Nichols – guitar, harmonica
- Norm Hamlet – steel guitar, dobro
- Tiny Moore – fiddle, mandolin
- Bobby Wayne – guitar, background vocals
- Mark Yeary – piano
- Jimmy Belkin – fiddle
- Dennis Hromek – bass
- Biff Adam – drums
- Don Markham – trumpet, saxophone

== Charts ==
=== Weekly charts ===
| Chart (1982–1983) | Peak position |
|---|---|
| US Hot Country Songs (Billboard) | 1 |
| Canadian RPM Country Tracks | 1 |

=== Year-end charts ===
| Chart (1983) | Position |
|---|---|
| US Hot Country Songs (Billboard) | 33 |
