= David Frizzell =

American singer

- Born: September 26, 1941 (age 84)
- Origin: El Dorado, Arkansas, U.S.
- Genres: Country; Countrypolitan; rockabilly
- Occupations: Singer, songwriter
- Instruments: Vocals; guitar
- Years active: 1959–present
- Labels: Capitol; Cartwheel; Columbia; MCA; Nashville America; Playback; RSO; Viva; Warner Bros.
- Website: www.davidfrizzell.com

David Frizzell (born September 26, 1941) is an American country music singer. He is the younger brother of country musician Lefty Frizzell. His career started in the late 1950s, but he had his greatest success in the 1980s.

== Early life ==
Lee David Frizzell was born in El Dorado, Arkansas, United States. on September 26, 1941. In 1956 his family moved to California to live near his older brother Lefty. He began performing in his brother's show at the age of 12. He toured with his brother throughout the 1950s.

Frizzell served in the United States Air Force from 1960 to 1964. After leaving the military he signed with Columbia Records in 1970 and finally achieved solo success, placing the single "I Just Can't Help Believing" on the Billboard top-40 country chart.

== Later music career ==
In 1973 Frizzell began working for Buck Owens, and appeared regularly on Owens' All American TV Show during the 1970s. He had a recording contract with Capitol Records.

In 1981, he recorded his first number-one country hit, "You're the Reason God Made Oklahoma," a duet with Shelly West, who, at the time, was married to Frizzell's youngest brother Allen. the duo's producer pitched the song to Nashville record companies but no one was interested until Clint Eastwood wanted it for his film Any Which Way You Can. The film's soundtrack made the song a hit, after record producers' dismissed it. The song won the Country Music Association's Song of the Year and Vocal Duet of the Year awards in 1981, was nominated for a Grammy Award for Best Country Performance by a Duo or Group with Vocal. Frizzell and West also won the Academy of Country Music award for Vocal Duo of the Year in 1981 and 1982.

In August 1982, Frizzell scored his only solo number-one country single with "I'm Gonna Hire a Wino to Decorate Our Home". He continued to tour and record with West until 1986.

After he parted ways with Shelly West, Frizzell continued to record solo albums, but he has not kept up the popularity he enjoyed during the early 1980s.

== Discography ==
=== Albums ===
| Year | Album | US Country | Label |
|---|---|---|---|
| 1981 | Carryin' On the Family Names (with Shelly West) | 6 | Warner/Viva |
| 1982 | The David Frizzell & Shelly West Album (with Shelly West) | 8 | Warner/Viva |
| 1982 | The Family's Fine, But This One's All Mine | 7 | Warner/Viva |
| 1983 | Our Best to You (with Shelly West) | 24 | Warner/Viva |
| 1983 | On My Own Again | 32 | Viva |
| 1984 | In Session (with Shelly West) | 33 | Viva |
| 1984 | Solo | — | Viva |
| 1984 | Golden Duets (The Best of Frizzell & West) (with Shelly West) | 45 | Viva |
| 1993 | My Life Is Just a Bridge | — | BFE |
| 1999 | For the Love of Country | — | Kingston |
| 2004 | Confidentially | — | Nashville America |
| 2010 | Frizzell & Friends – This Is Our Time | — | Nashville America |
| 2012 | Frizzell & Friends – It'll Be Alright | — | Nashville America |
| 2014 | Frizzell & Friends present Buddy Holly Country Tribute: Remember Me | — | Nashville America |

=== Singles ===
| Year | Song | Chart Positions | | Album |
| Year | Song | US Country | CAN Country | Album |
|---|---|---|---|---|
| 1970 | "L.A. International Airport" | 67 | — | singles only |
| 1970 | "I Just Can't Help Believing" | 36 | — | singles only |
| 1971 | "Goodbye" | 73 | — | singles only |
| 1973 | "Words Don't Come Easy" | 63 | — | singles only |
| 1973 | "Take Me One More Ride" | 94 | — | singles only |
| 1976 | "A Case of You" | 100 | — | singles only |
| 1981 | "Lefty" (with Merle Haggard) | 45 | — | Carryin' On the Family Names |
| 1982 | "I'm Gonna Hire a Wino to Decorate Our Home"^{A} | 1 | 3 | The Family's Fine, But; This One's All Mine |
| 1982 | "Lost My Baby Blues" | 5 | 5 | The Family's Fine, But; This One's All Mine |
| 1983 | "Where Are You Spending Your Nights These Days" | 10 | 13 | On My Own Again |
| 1983 | "A Million Light Beers Ago" | 39 | 38 | On My Own Again |
| 1984 | "Black and White" | 64 | — | On My Own Again |
| 1984 | "Who Dat" | 60 | — | Solo |
| 1984 | "When We Get Back to the Farm (That's When We Really Go to Town)" | 49 | 43 | Solo |
| 1984 | "No Way Jose" | 49 | 38 | single only |
| 1985 | "Country Music Love Affair" | 63 | — | Solo |
| 1986 | "Celebrity" | 71 | — | singles only |
| 1987 | "Beautiful Body" | 74 | — | singles only |
| 1993 | "The One That Got Away" (with Ed Bruce) | — | — | My Life Is Just a Bridge |
| 2012 | "Say Hello to Heaven" | — | — | Frizzell & Friends – It'll Be Alright |

- ^{A}"I'm Gonna Hire a Wino to Decorate Our Home" also peaked at No. 20 on the RPM Top Singles chart in Canada.

=== Singles with Shelly West ===
| Year | Song | Chart Positions | | Album |
| Year | Song | US Country | CAN Country | Album |
|---|---|---|---|---|
| 1981 | "You're the Reason God Made Oklahoma" | 1 | 13 | Carryin' on the Family Names |
| 1981 | "A Texas State of Mind" | 9 | — | Carryin' on the Family Names |
| 1981 | "Husbands and Wives" | 16 | 38 | Carryin' on the Family Names |
| 1982 | "Another Honky-Tonk Night on Broadway" | 8 | 20 | The David Frizzell & Shelly West Album |
| 1982 | "I Just Came Here to Dance" | 4 | 9 | The David Frizzell & Shelly West Album |
| 1982 | "Please Surrender" | 43 | — | Our Best to You |
| 1983 | "Cajun Invitation" | 52 | — | Our Best to You |
| 1983 | "Pleasure Island" | 71 | — | In Session |
| 1984 | "Silent Partners" | 20 | 20 | In Session |
| 1984 | "It's a Be Together Night" | 13 | 40 | Golden Duets (The Best of Frizzell & West) |
| 1985 | "Do Me Right" | 60 | — | Golden Duets (The Best of Frizzell & West) |

=== Music videos ===
| Year | Video |
|---|---|
| 1984 | "Silent Partners" |
| 1987 | "Beautiful Body" |
| 1993 | "The One That Got Away" (with Ed Bruce) |

== Bibliography ==
- Bush, John (2003). Edited by Vladimir Bogdanov, Chris Woodstra, & Stephen Erlewine. "David Frizzell." All Music Guide to Country, 2nd ed. San Francisco: Backbeat Books, 2003. ISBN 0-87930-760-9
- Whitburn, Joel. "The Billboard Book of Top 40 Country Hits" New York: Billboard Publications Inc., 1996. ISBN 0-8230-8289-X
