= 1925 in country music =

List of years in country music	(table)
- … 1915; 1916; 1917; 1918; 1919; 1920; 1921; 1922; 1923; 1924; 1925; 1926; 1927; 1928; 1929; 1930; 1931; 1932; 1933; 1934; 1935 …
- Art; Archaeology; Architecture; Literature; Music; Philosophy; Science; +...

This is a list of notable events in country music that took place in the year 1925.

== Events ==
- November 28 – Nashville radio station WSM begins a national institution with its first broadcast of the "WSM Barn Dance" – the weekly program that would go on to be known as the Grand Ole Opry.
- January 1925, the major labels were still releasing country material on pop labels. The record companies hadn't quite yet settled on the moniker of ‘hillbilly music’ for this new style of music. Descriptions included “Old- Time Tunes” (OKeh), “Old Familiar Tunes” (Columbia), “tunes from Dixie” (Brunswick), and “Olde Time Fiddlin’ Tunes from the Sunny South” (Victor). The term first appeared on an OKeh release from 1925, a recording of a string band from Watauga County, NC, who showed up at the New York recording studio without having decided what to call themselves. When Ralph Peer, who was supervising the sessions, asked for their names, one of the group's members responded, “We’re nothing but a bunch of hillbillies from North Carolina and Virginia. Call us anything.” So Peer released the sides under the name “the Hill Billies.”
- Aug 1924 thru March 1926 to 1930 "The Prisoner's Song" by Vernon Dalhart becomes country music's first-ever million-seller, and has two waves of popularity — during the early summer months and again at the end of the year. The song goes on to sell 7 million copies. On March 18, 1926, Dalhart re-cut electronic versions of both sides of Victor 19427, which were released with the same disc number, and are included in the sales figures. 1924 Prisoner's Song was take 2, and 1926 version was take 6; The Wreck of the Old 97 take 1 1924, and 1926 was take 4.

=== No dates ===
- Radio station WSM signs on the air, and is credited for helping spread the popularity of the fledgling country music genre.
- Beginning of "Old Familiar Melodies" series on Columbia Records.
- Bradley Kincaid joins the cast of WLS Barn Dance.

== Top Hillbilly (Country) Recordings ==
The following songs were extracted from records included in Joel Whitburn's Pop Memories 1890-1954, record sales reported on the "Discography of American Historical Recordings" website, and other sources as specified. Numerical rankings are approximate, they are only used as a frame of reference.

Rank	Artist	Title	Label	Recorded	Released	Chart Positions
1	Vernon Dalhart	"The Prisoner's Song"	Victor 19427	August 13, 1924	November 1924	US BB 1925 #3, US #1 for 5 weeks, 20 total weeks, US Hillbilly 1925 #1, 1,320,356 sales thru 1930
2	Carl T. Sprague	"When the Work's All Done This Fall"	Victor 19747	June 30, 1924	November 1924	US Hillbilly 1925 #2, 900,000 sales (unconfirmed)
3	Poole's North Carolina Ramblers	"Don't Let Your Deal Go Down Blues"	Columbia 15038	July 27, 1925	September 1925	US Hillbilly 1925 #3, 102,000 sales
4	Vernon Dalhart	"The Death of Floyd Collins"	Victor 19779	September 9, 1925	November 1925	US BB 1926 #21, US #3 for 1 week, 7 total weeks, US Hillbilly 1925 #4, 403,055 sales
5	Ernest V Stoneman	"The Titanic (The sinking of the Titanic)"	Okeh 40288	January 8, 1925	February 1925	US BB 1925 #21, US #3 for 1 weeks, 10 total weeks, US Hillbilly 1925 #5 500,000 sales
6	Vernon Dalhart	"The Pal That I Loved (Stole the Gal I Loved)"	Okeh 40177	July 29, 1924	December 1924	US BB 1925 #37, US #4 for 1 week, 5 total weeks, US Hillbilly 1925 #6
7	Fiddlin' John Carson	"Old Dan Tucker"	Okeh 40263	December 18, 1924	January 1925	US BB 1925 #119, US #10 for 1 week, 1 total weeks, US Hillbilly 1925 #7
8	Kelly Harrell	"Roving Gambler"	Victor 19596	January 7, 1925	April 1925	US Hillbilly 1925 #8
9	Gene Austin and Carson Robison	"Way Down Home"	Victor 19637	February 4, 1925	June 1925	US Hillbilly 1925 #9
10	Vernon Dalhart	"The Convict and the Rose"	Victor 19770	August 26, 1925	November 1925	US BB 1926 #98, US #9 for 1 week, 2 total weeks, US Hillbilly 1925 #10
11	Poole's North Carolina Ramblers	"Can I Sleep In Your Barn Tonight Mister"	Columbia 15038	July 27, 1925	September 1925	US Hillbilly 1925 #11
12	Vernon Dalhart	"Letter Edged in Black"	Brunswick 2900	May 21, 1925	September 1925	US BB 1925 #120, US #10 for 1 week, 1 total weeks, US Hillbilly 1925 #12
13	Vernon Dalhart	"In the Baggage Coach Ahead"	Victor 19627	March 19, 1925	May 1925	US BB 1925 #158, US #14 for 1 week, 1 total weeks, US Hillbilly 1925 #13
14	Fiddlin' Powers & Family	"Old Joe Clark"	Victor 19434	August 18, 1924	December 1924	US Hillbilly 1925 #14
15	Fiddlin' John Carson	"Run, Nigger, Run"	Okeh 40230	August 27, 1924	December 1924	US Hillbilly 1925 #15
16	Kelly Harrell	"New River Train"	Victor 19596	January 7, 1925	April 1925	US Hillbilly 1925 #16
17	Vernon Dalhart	"The Wreck of the Shenandoah"	Victor 19779	September 9, 1925	November 1925	US BB 1926 #68, US #6 for 1 week, 3 total weeks, US Hillbilly 1925 #17
18	Bennie Moten's Kansas City Orchestra	"South"	Okeh 8194	November 29, 1924	December 1924	US BB 1925 #144, US #12 for 1 week, 1 total weeks, US Hillbilly 1925 #18
19	Emmett Miller	"Anytime"	Okeh 40239	October 25, 1924	December 1924	US Hillbilly 1925 #19
20	Uncle Dave Macon	"Hill Billie Blues"	Vocalion 14904	July 8, 1924	December 1924	US Hillbilly 1925 #20

== Births ==
- May 23 – Mac Wiseman, leading bluegrass artist from the 1940s onward (died 2019).
- August 7 – Felice Bryant, songwriter (with husband Boudleaux) of many 1950s and 1960s hits (died 2003).
- August 15 – Rose Maddox, fiddle player, leader of the Maddox Brothers and Rose, and early innovator of rockabilly (died 1998).
- August 28 – Billy Grammer, Grand Ole Opry member best known for his hit "Gotta Travel On" (died 2011).
- September 3 – Hank Thompson, singer who fused western swing and honky tonk for a series of successful records from the 1940s through 1970s (died 2007).
- September 26 – Marty Robbins, multi-genre singer-songwriter and television host (died 1982).
- December 3 – Ferlin Husky, honky-tonk styled singer of the 1950s through early 1970s, best known for "Gone" and "Wings of a Dove," and hits under his comic alias "Simon Crum" ("Country Music is Here to Stay") (died 2011).
