= List of years in country music =

This page indexes the individual year in country music pages. Each year is annotated with a significant event as a reference point.

Pre-1920s – 1920s – 1930s – 1940s – 1950s – 1960s – 1970s – 1980s – 1990s – 2000s – 2010s - 2020s -

== Pre-1920s ==
- Prior to 1920 in country music,
- Train accidents – the C & O in 1890 near Hinton, West Virginia; train 382 occurs in 1900 in Vaughn, Mississippi; and train 97 in 1903 near Danville, Virginia – become the subject of several early country recordings.
- The word "Hillbillie" printed for the first time in New York Journal on April 23, 1900.
- "Rube" comedy, long country dialect tales like "Uncle Josh" become popular in 1909.

== 1920s ==
- 1920 in country music
- 1921 in country music
- 1922 in country music, First commercial recordings of country music by Eck Robertson for Victor Records.
- 1923 in country music, First radio "barn dance" WBAP in Fort Worth, Texas. "Sally Gooden" by A.C. (Eck) Robertson top country record.
- 1924 in country music, "It Ain't Gonna Rain No Mo'" by Wendell Hall top country record. "The Prisoner's Song" recorded by Vernon Dalhart in August sells 1.3 million records by end of decade.
- 1925 in country music, WSM signs on; first WSM Barn Dance. "The Prisoner's Song" by Vernon Dalhart top country record. Charlie Poole and The North Carolina Ramblers recorded the successful "Don't Let Your Deal Go Down Blues" and "The Girl I Loved in Sunny Tennessee" on July 27.
- 1926 in country music, Formation of The Skillet Lickers. "The Prisoner's Song" by Vernon Dalhart second chart run Top Country Record.
- 1927 in country music, The Carter Family, Jimmie Rodgers make their first recordings. "Bury Me Under the Weeping Willow" by the Carter Family Top Country Record.
- 1928 in country music, "Blue Yodel" recorded by Jimmie Rodgers "Blue Yodel No. 1 (T for Texas)" Top Country Record, and one of several million sellers by Rodgers.
- 1929 in country music, "Wildwood Flower" by the Carter Family top country record and sells one million copies. Gene Autry makes his first recordings.

== 1930s ==
- 1930 in country music, Ken Maynard becomes first singing screen cowboy. ""Anniversary Yodel (Blue Yodel No. 7)"" by Jimmie Rodgers Top Country Record.
- 1931 in country music, "Blue Yodel No. 8 (Mule Skinner Blues)" recorded by Jimmie Rodgers Top Country Record.
- 1932 in country music, "Why Should I Be Lonely" by Jimmie Rodgers with Lani McIntire's Hawaiians Top Country Record.
- 1933 in country music, Jimmie Rodgers dies in May 1933. "Yellow Rose Of Texas" by Gene Autry and Jimmy Long Top Country Record.
- 1934 in country music, "Tumbling Tumbleweeds" recorded by the Sons of the Pioneers Top Country Record.
- 1935 in country music, First recordings by Bob Wills and His Texas Playboys. "Can the Circle Be Unbroken (By and By)" by the Carter Family Top Country Record.
- 1936 in country music, First recordings by Ernest Tubb; formation of the Monroe Brothers (Charlie and Bill) and the Blue Sky Boys. "Mexicali Rose" by Gene Autry Top Country Record.
- 1937 in country music, Beginning of Renfro Valley Barn Dance. "Steel Guitar Rag" recorded by Bob Wills and His Texas Playboys Top Country Record.
- 1938 in country music, "Wabash Cannonball" recorded by Roy Acuff and the Crazy Tennesseans Top Country Record.
- 1939 in country music, Bill Monroe formed the Blue Grass Boys. "It Makes No Difference Now" by Cliff Bruner's Texas Wanderers Top Country Record. Billboard prints its first "Hillbilly...Hits" charts. These charts will continue, primarily on a monthly basis, until 1942.

== 1940s ==
- 1940 in country music, "You Are My Sunshine" by Bob Atcher and Bonnie Blue Eyes Top Country Record.
- 1941 in country music, Gene Autry's "You Are My Sunshine" Top Country Record and sells one million copies. Ernest Tubb records and releases "Walking the Floor Over You."
- 1942 in country music, Musicians' strike bans all recording starting August; Acuff-Rose Music, Inc., is incorporated in Tennessee.. "There's a Star-Spangled Banner Waving Somewhere" by Elton Britt Top Country Record and earns Gold record.
- 1943 in country music, Al Dexter and His Troopers's "Pistol Packin' Mama" Top Country Record, and becomes first Country record to also top Popular music chart.
- 1944 in country music, Billboard magazine creates national chart to track popularity of country music records. Al Dexter and His Troopers's "So Long Pal" Top Country Record.
- 1945 in country music, "Shame on You" by Spade Cooley and His Western Band Top Country Record. Lester Flatt and Earl Scruggs join the Blue Grass Boys. Often considered the beginning of Bluegrass music.
- 1946 in country music, "Guitar Polka" by Al Dexter and His Troopers Top Country Record.
- 1947 in country music, Hank Williams has first national hit; Eddy Arnold and his Tennessee Plowboys – "I'll Hold You in My Heart (Till I Can Hold You in My Arms) No. 1 record of 1947.
- 1948 in country music, Eddy Arnold has five of the year's six new No. 1 songs, with "Bouquet of Roses" and "Anytime" the biggest of the lot. "Bouquet of Roses" No. 1 hit of all time based on total chart performance.
- 1949 in country music, Hank Williams' first giant hit, "Lovesick Blues" Top Country Record.

== 1950s ==
- 1950 in country music, 21 weeks at No. 1 for Hank Snow's "I’m Moving On."
- 1951 in country music, The year of "Hank and Lefty" (as Merle Haggard would sing in song more than 25 years later); Hank Snow and Eddy Arnold were equally dominating; chart debut of Carl Smith.
- 1952 in country music, The fall of Hank Williams; Kitty Wells has first solo female No. 1 song with "It Wasn't God Who Made Honky Tonk Angels." Carl Smith becomes only country artist to have two records tied at No. 1 on the modern Billboard country charts ("Let Old Mother Nature Have Her Way" and "Don't Just Stand There")
- 1953 in country music, Death of Hank Williams, Betty Jack Davis; crash that kills Davis will also sideline duet partner Skeeter Davis' career until the end of the 1950s.
- 1954 in country music, Elvis Presley makes first recordings, one and only appearance on Grand Ole Opry; the rise of the pedal steel guitar; Hank Snow"s "I Don't Hurt Anymore" and the Red Foley-Kitty Wells duet "One by One" are ranked 1-2 for 19 consecutive weeks on Billboard magazine's country "Best Sellers in Stores" chart.
- 1955 in country music, Johnny Cash, George Jones, Elvis Presley and Porter Wagoner each have first national hits; Webb Pierce spends 40 combined weeks at No. 1 on Billboard country chart's "Best Sellers in Stores" chart with "In the Jailhouse Now" (20 weeks), "I Don't Care" (12 weeks) and "Love Love Love" (eight weeks). Ozark Jubilee premieres on ABC-TV.
- 1956 in country music, Ray Price, Marty Robbins and Johnny Horton emerge, resurrect traditional country music after the influx of rock and roll threatens the heart of country music.
- 1957 in country music, Rock-flavored acts — Elvis Presley, Jerry Lee Lewis, Everly Brothers and Ricky Nelson — dominate charts; Patsy Cline debuts on the charts.
- 1958 in country music, The Nashville sound becomes country music's response to continued encroachment of genre by rock artists; Billboard magazine consolidates best-sellers and disc jockeys' charts into one all-encompassing "Hot C&W Sides" chart.
- 1959 in country music, Chart debut of Buck Owens and rise of trademark Bakersfield Sound; peak of the saga song, through songs such as "The Battle of New Orleans," "Long Black Veil" and "El Paso."

== 1960s ==
- 1960 in country music, Only four songs reach No. 1 on Billboard magazine country chart during the entire year; chart debut of Loretta Lynn; death of Johnny Horton in car accident; premiere of "The Porter Wagoner Show."
- 1961 in country music, Country Music Association announces creation of Country Music Hall of Fame; Patsy Cline has first No. 1 hit ("I Fall to Pieces").
- 1962 in country music, Ray Charles releases Modern Sounds in Country and Western Music.
- 1963 in country music, Tragedies befall country music, with deaths of Patsy Cline, Cowboy Copas and Hawkshaw Hawkins (plane crash); Jack Anglin (car accident, en route to Cline's funeral) and Texas Ruby (house fire) all in less than a month's span.
- 1964 in country music, Plane crash kills Jim Reeves; chart debut of Hank Williams Jr. Connie Smith begins her eight-week stay at number one with "Once a Day".
- 1965 in country music, Return of Eddy Arnold goes along with crossover hit "Make the World Go Away"; multi-Grammy winner with Roger Miller's "King of the Road"
- 1966 in country music, Chart debuts of Lynn Anderson, Tammy Wynette and Charley Pride, the latter who goes on to become the most successful black performer in country music; first Academy of Country Music awards show airs (shown on tape-delay on the fading The Jimmy Dean Show).
- 1967 in country music, First Country Music Association awards (non-televised this year only); Dolly Parton's chart debut, becomes regular on The Porter Wagoner Show.
- 1968 in country music, Johnny Cash records At Folsom Prison; crossover successes of "Honey," "Harper Valley PTA"; Tammy Wynette records "Stand by Your Man"; final No. 1 hit for Eddy Arnold; death of Red Foley.
- 1969 in country music, Premieres of Hee Haw, The Glen Campbell Goodtime Hour, The Johnny Cash Show. Marriage of George Jones and Tammy Wynette, known as "The First Couple of Country Music."

== 1970s ==
- 1970 in country music, Loretta Lynn and Conway Twitty – who each release their signature songs during the year (she with "Coal Miner's Daughter," he with "Hello Darlin'") – record their first duet, "After the Fire is Gone".
- 1971 in country music, Television's rural purge; African-American singer Charley Pride named CMA Entertainer of the Year; Lynn Anderson's international crossover hit "Rose Garden"; songwriter Freddie Hart becomes overnight superstar with release of "Easy Loving"; Dolly Parton releases signature hit "Coat Of Many Colors."
- 1972 in country music, Fan Fair debuts; Opryland USA opens; Will the Circle be Unbroken album issued; 13-year-old Tanya Tucker becomes an overnight sensation; Donna Fargo earns country and pop hit with The_Happiest_Girl_in_the_Whole_U.S.A."; Sonny James signs with Columbia Records, leaving Capitol Records after 20 years, has his first No. 1 hit with "When the Snow Is on the Roses" that fall.
- 1973 in country music, Grand Ole Opry moves from the Ryman Auditorium to its new house in Opryland; murder of Stringbean; premiere of "American Country Countdown"; Johnny Rodriguez becomes the first Hispanic country star; rise of Charlie Rich as major star ("Behind Closed Doors", "The Most Beautiful Girl").
- 1974 in country music, Rise of British-Australian pop singer Olivia Newton-John and her surprise win of the Country Music Association Female Vocalist of the Year award; veteran country performers respond with the short-lived Association of Country Entertainers in attempt to keep country music "country;" Dolly Parton leaves The Porter Wagoner Show.
- 1975 in country music, Continued backlash over pop-influenced country after John Denver is named CMA Entertainer of the Year; country music records chart highly on the Billboard Hot 100; Willie Nelson becomes major star 15 years after his first recordings with album Redheaded Stranger; divorce of George Jones and Tammy Wynette; deaths of Bob Wills, Lefty Frizzell and George Morgan.
- 1976 in country music, CB radio-song craze hits its peak; Wanted! The Outlaws released; Loretta Lynn's autobiography becomes a New York Times best seller.
- 1977 in country music, Death of Elvis Presley; six weeks at No. 1 for Waylon Jennings' "Luckenbach, Texas (Back to the Basics of Love)"; Kenny Rogers makes comeback as solo country singer; Dolly Parton begins recording pop-oriented music instead of merely country, first with "Here You Come Again."
- 1978 in country music, Barbara Mandrell's decade-old career hits new heights with her first No. 1 record; Kenny Rogers releases "The Gambler"; Bob Kingsley becomes host of "American Country Countdown" (after several years of producing show). Deaths of Bob Luman, Johnny Bond and Mel Street.
- 1979 in country music, Kenny Rogers releases second signature story song, "Coward Of The County," becomes top crossover artist.

== 1980s ==
- 1980 in country music, Debuts of movies about country music and/or country singers in leading roles (Coal Miner's Daughter, Urban Cowboy); nomination of two country songs for Academy Award for Best Original Song; Alabama signs with RCA Records and begins long-term success. Death of Red Sovine.
- 1981 in country music, Rise of neotraditional country with debuts of George Strait, John Anderson, and Ricky Skaggs; The Oak Ridge Boys release their biggest hit song, "Elvira," while Eddie Rabbitt enjoys crossover success with "I Love a Rainy Night" and "Step By Step" during second peak wave of songs crossing over to pop charts. Barbara Mandrell becomes first artist to win back to back Entertainer of the Year award 1980-1981 from CMA & ACM.
- 1982 in country music, Alabama wins first CMA "Entertainer of the Year" award; Willie Nelson's "Always on My Mind" is a major crossover hit; death of Marty Robbins.
- 1983 in country music, CMT, The Nashville Network premiere on cable television; The Judds sign national recording contract; Kenny Rogers and Dolly Parton duet "Islands in the Stream" becomes a crossover smash.
- 1984 in country music, Willie Nelson, Julio Iglesias duet "To All the Girls I've Loved Before"; Hank Williams Jr. records video for "All My Rowdy Friends Are Coming Over Tonight".
- 1985 in country music, New York Times declares country music "dead"; Alabama sets a new Billboard magazine Hot Country Singles record for most consecutive No. 1 singles without a miss.
- 1986 in country music, Debuts of Randy Travis, Dwight Yoakam and others reinvigorate country music; Buck Owens leaves Hee Haw; no multi-week No. 1 songs on Billboard country chart; Columbia Records drops Johnny Cash after 28 years. Conway Twitty has last No. 1 hit, "Desperado Love".
- 1987 in country music, Reba McEntire wins unprecedented fourth Female Vocalist of the Year award from the Country Music Association; K. T. Oslin becomes a star in her late 40s, a first for a country female vocalist.
- 1988 in country music, chronicling the history of country music on compact disc (among the first being the Country USA series); Merle Haggard's last No. 1 hit.
- 1989 in country music, The rise and chart debuts of Garth Brooks, Clint Black, Travis Tritt and Alan Jackson; death of Keith Whitley; Ronnie Milsap has last No. 1 hit, "A Woman in Love."

== 1990s ==
- 1990 in country music, Resurgence in multi-week No. 1s ("Hard Rock Bottom of Your Heart", "Love Without End, Amen").
- 1991 in country music, Debuts of Diamond Rio, Trisha Yearwood, Hal Ketchum, Davis Daniel, Brooks & Dunn, B. B. Watson, Sammy Kershaw and Tracy Lawrence; Ropin' the Wind by Garth Brooks debuts at No. 1 on pop album chart, deaths of Dottie West, Webb Pierce and Tennessee Ernie Ford.
- 1992 in country music, Hee Haw ends first-run production; the rise of line dancing and related hit singles, particularly "Achy Breaky Heart" and "Boot-Scootin' Boogie". Deaths of Roy Acuff and Roger Miller. Chart debut of John Michael Montgomery and Tim McGraw.
- 1993 in country music, Deaths of Conway Twitty and David Houston; marriage of Shania Twain to Robert Lange; Chart debut of Toby Keith.
- 1994 in country music, The push for more pop-influenced country (tied to the success of Garth Brooks and rise of newcomers Faith Hill and Tim McGraw); the comeback of Johnny Cash. Chart debut of Kenny Chesney.
- 1995 in country music, The rise of Shania Twain; death of Charlie Rich; Great American Country premieres.
- 1996 in country music, Marriage of Tim McGraw and Faith Hill; deaths of Gus Hardin and Faron Young.
- 1997 in country music, Six weeks at No. 1 for "It's Your Love"; Shania Twain's Come On Over is released; Barbara Mandrell retires. Deaths of Bobby Helms and John Denver.
- 1998 in country music, Deaths of Tammy Wynette, Eddie Rabbitt, Carl Perkins and Gene Autry. "This Kiss" by Faith Hill, "You're Still the One" by Shania Twain become major crossover hits, rekindling debate over pop-influenced country music.
- 1999 in country music, Lonestar's "Amazed" spends eight weeks at No. 1, and becomes a major pop hit. Deaths of Hoyt Axton, Rex Allen and Hank Snow.

== 2000s ==
- 2000 in country music, Toby Keith's breakthrough; Vince Gill and Amy Grant marry; Kenny Rogers becomes the oldest singer to have a No. 1 song; Garth Brooks announces plans for retirement; Rascal Flatts' debut album released; RFD-TV, a cable/satellite TV network focusing on farming and rural living but also features reruns of classic country music TV programming, is launched.
- 2001 in country music, Tributes to those killed in the September 11 attacks. Death of Johnny Russell.
- 2002 in country music, Toby Keith/Natalie Maines feud; comeback albums from Shania Twain, Faith Hill and the Dixie Chicks, The Statler Brothers final concert and retirement. Death of Waylon Jennings.
- 2003 in country music, Rascal Flatts' "I Melt" video and Dixie Chicks controversies; deaths of Don Gibson, Johnny Paycheck, Johnny Cash and June Carter Cash; 70-year-old Willie Nelson has No. 1 hit.
- 2004 in country music, Invasion of the MuzikMafia; death of Opry star Skeeter Davis.
- 2005 in country music, Carrie Underwood wins American Idol; Garth Brooks marries Trisha Yearwood; Walk the Line biopic released; death of Chris LeDoux.
- 2006 in country music, George Strait's 41st number one hit on the Billboard charts; new host for "American Country Countdown"; deaths of Buck Owens, Johnny Duncan and Freddie Fender.
- 2007 in country music, Country music's big night at the Grammys; Garth Brooks' record-breaking hit single; deaths of Henson Cargill, Del Reeves, Porter Wagoner and Hank Thompson.
- 2008 in country music, George Strait sets new record with 56 number one singles; deaths of Eddy Arnold and Jerry Reed; rise of Taylor Swift as a major crossover artist; Shania Twain and Robert John "Mutt" Lange separate after 14 years of marriage.
- 2009 in country music, Brooks & Dunn announces their break up; Garth Brooks comes out of retirement; Taylor Swift-Kanye West conflict at an MTV awards show; deaths of Ernest Ashworth, Vern Gosdin, Dan Seals and Opry star Hank Locklin.

== 2010s ==
- 2010 in country music, Taylor Swift wins four Grammy Awards including Album of the Year; Carrie Underwood becomes the first woman in history to win the ACM's Entertainer of the Year award twice; Flooding on the Cumberland River in Nashville damages parts of the city including the Grand Ole Opry House; deaths of Hank Cochran, Carl Smith and Jimmy Dean; "Need You Now" by Lady Antebellum becomes crossover smash.
- 2011 in country music, marriage of Blake Shelton and Miranda Lambert; Glen Campbell announcement that he has Alzheimer's, plans to retire; deaths of Mel McDaniel and Billie Jo Spears; Lady Antebellum wins five Grammy Awards including Record and Song of the Year; Scotty McCreery wins American Idol. “Red Solo Cup” by Toby Keith becomes a viral and crossover hit upon release.
- 2012 in country music, George Jones and George Strait announce plans to retire from touring; Garth Brooks elected to Country Music Hall of Fame; Billboard makes changes to the Hot Country Songs chart; death of Kitty Wells.
- 2013 in country music, Nash FM debuts; deaths of Mindy McCready, George Jones, Tompall Glaser, Jack Greene, Claude King, Cal Smith and Ray Price; Price's brief feud with Blake Shelton; "Cruise" by Florida Georgia Line breaks chart records.
- 2014 in country music, George Strait retires from touring; Garth Brooks releases new album and begins world tour; Carrie Underwood announces pregnancy; Taylor Swift begins making pop orientated music; deaths of George Hamilton IV, Jimmy C. Newman, Dawn Sears, Kevin Sharp and Phil Everly of The Everly Brothers.
- 2015 in country music, Keith Hill controversy; Cledus T. Judd retires; Blake Shelton and Miranda Lambert divorce; deaths of Lynn Anderson, Jim Ed Brown, Little Jimmy Dickens and Daron Norwood.
- 2016 in country music, Release of "Forever Country"; deaths of Joey Martin Feek, Holly Dunn, Glenn Frey, Merle Haggard and Jean Shepard.
- 2017 in country music, Landmark chart accomplishments for Luke Bryan (most No. 1 hits from a single album) and Sam Hunt (longest run for a song at No. 1); deaths of Glen Campbell, Don Williams, Troy Gentry (of Montgomery Gentry) and Mel Tillis; Las Vegas shooting, Loretta Lynn suffers a stroke at home in Hurricane Mills, TN.
- 2018 in country music, "Meant to Be" sets No. 1 longevity bar at 50 weeks; deaths of Lari White, Daryle Singletary, Freddie Hart and Roy Clark.
- 2019 in country music, Kacey Musgraves wins four Grammy Awards, including Album of the Year; "Old Town Road" chart controversy and related rise of trap country; Hal Ketchum announces he has Alzheimer's; deaths of Sanger D. Shafer, Jim Glaser, Earl Thomas Conley and Bob Kingsley.

== 2020s ==
- 2020 in country music, Deaths of Billy Joe Shaver, Kenny Rogers, Joe Diffie, Charlie Daniels, Mac Davis, John Prine, Jan Howard, Johnny Bush, Doug Supernaw, Hal Ketchum, Charley Pride and K. T. Oslin; ongoing COVID-19 pandemic impacts multiple events, concerts; Lady A, The Chicks change to their new names following racial unrest.
- 2021 in country music, Deaths of Ed Bruce, Jamie O'Hara of The O'Kanes, Misty Morgan of Jack Blanchard & Misty Morgan, B. J. Thomas, Tom T. Hall, Don Everly of The Everly Brothers and Stonewall Jackson; Taylor Swift begins to re-release her country albums and her re-recorded version of "Love Story" returned to number one on the country charts.
- 2022 in country music, Deaths of Dallas Frazier, Scotty Wray of The Wrays, Warner Mack, Jimbeau Henson, Brad Martin, Jeff Carson, C. W. McCall, Shane Yellowbird, Naomi Judd of The Judds, Mickey Gilley, Deborah McCrary, Joel Whitburn, Olivia Newton-John, Luke Bell, Loretta Lynn, Jerry Lee Lewis, and Jeff Cook of Alabama; Toby Keith diagnosed with stomach cancer.
- 2023 in country music, Bill Anderson longevity on the Grand Ole Opry; Jason Aldean controversy over lyrical and video content of "Try That in a Small Town"; deaths of Gordon Lightfoot and Claude Gray.
- 2024 in country music, Deaths of Toby Keith and Kris Kristofferson; retirement (and subsequent death) of Joe Bonsall from The Oak Ridge Boys (which were in the midst of a retirement tour).
- 2025 in country music, 100 years of the Grand Ole Opry celebrated, with Connie Smith reaching 60 years of membership (first female vocalist and second overall artist to reach milestone); Ryan Fox becomes host of American Country Countdown; deaths of Johnny Rodriguez and Jeannie Seely.
- 2026 in country music, Death of Dolly Parton; Ella Langley's record-breaking "Choosin' Texas" and Taylor Swift's return to country radio with "I Knew It, I Knew You."
