= Prior to 1920 in country music =

== Events ==
=== 1900 ===
- April 23 – The word hillbillie is printed for the first time in the New York Journal.

=== No dates ===
- Several train crashes, all occurring between 1890 and 1903, occur throughout the country, inspiring several early country music recordings. These include the wreck of the C&O in 1890 ("Engine 143" by the Carter Family), train 382 near Vaughn, Mississippi (which inspired "Casey Jones") and train 97 near Danville, Virginia (bearing "Wreck of the Old 97"). The resulting themes are tales of tragedy, bravery and triumph.
- "Rube" comedy and long country dialect tales, such as the "Uncle Josh" series of songs from Cal Stewart, become popular in the first decade of the 1900s and first part of the 1910s.

== Notable recordings of the pre-1920s era ==
=== 1917 ===
- "Till the Clouds Roll By" – Vernon Dalhart

=== 1919 ===
- "Till We Meet Again" – Vernon Dalhart and Gladys Rice

=== 1912 ===
- "Ragtime Cowboy Joe" – Bob Roberts

== Births ==
=== 1848 ===
- Uncle Jimmy Thompson – first person to appear on the Grand Ole Opry (d. 1931).

=== 1868 ===
- March 23 – Fiddlin' John Carson, one of radio's first country music stars, recorded "The Little Old Log Cabin in the Lane" (d. 1949).

=== 1870 ===
- October 7 – Uncle Dave Macon, "The Dixie Dewdrop" and country music pioneer who combined banjo playing, singing and comic talents to be one of the Grand Ole Opry's first stars (d. 1952).

=== 1883 ===
- April 6 – Vernon Dalhart, early 1900s singer whose "The Prisoner's Song" became country music's first million-selling single in 1925 (d. 1948).

=== 1885 ===
- June 6 – Gid Tanner, old-time fiddler and leader of the Skillet Lickers, which became one of the first major country music bands (d. 1960).

=== 1887 ===
- November 20 – A.C. "Eck" Robertson, fiddle player whose "Sally Gooden" became the first recording in the country music genre (d. 1975).

=== 1889 ===
- October 19 – Arthur E. Satherley, pioneering music executive (d. 1986).

=== 1891 ===
- August 25 – Tom Darby, singer, guitar player and partner of Jimmie Tarlton (as Darby and Tarlton) (d. 1971).
- December 15 – A. P. Carter, member of the legendary and original "Carter Family" (d. 1960).

=== 1892 ===
- March 22 – Charlie Poole, singer, banjo player and leader of the "North Carolina Ramblers" (d. 1931).
- April 6 – Henry Whitter, singer and one of the first recorded country musicians (d. 1941)
- May 8 – Jimmie Tarlton, singer, steel guitar player and partner of Tom Darby (as Darby and Tarlton) (d. 1979).
- May 22 – Ralph Peer, talent scout and pioneering recording executive and producer (d. 1960).

=== 1893 ===
- May 25 – Ernest "Pop" Stoneman, singer, multi-instrumentalist and country musician (d. 1968).

=== 1894 ===
- May 7 – Riley Puckett, singer, guitarist and member of the "Skillet Lickers (d. 1946).

=== 1895 ===
- January 5 – Elizabeth Cotten, left-handed guitarist and folk musician (d. 1987).
- May 10 – Carl T. Sprague, "The Original Singing Cowboy" (d. 1979).
- July 13 – Bradley Kincaid, early country musician and folk singer (d. 1989)
- September 29 – Clarence Ashley, banjoist, guitarist and early country musician (d. 1967).
- November 9 – George D. Hay, "The Solemn Old Judge", legendary announcer, first on WLS and later on WSM Grand Ole Opry (d. 1968).

=== 1896 ===
- August 23 – Wendell Hall, "The Red Headed Music Maker", early country music singer (d. 1969).

=== 1897 ===
- March 20 – Frank Hutchison, early country blues singer and slide guitar player. (d. 1945).
- September 8 – Jimmie Rodgers, "The Singing Brakeman", "America's Blue Yodeler", legendary country singer famous for his "Blue Yodels" (d. 1933).

=== 1898 ===
- February 7 – Dock Boggs, old time country singer (d. 1971).
- July 20 – J. E. Mainer, old time fiddle player of The Mountaineers and brother to Wade Mainer. (d. 1971).
- July 21 – Sara Carter, member of the legendary and original "Carter Family". (d. 1979).
- August 24 – Fred Rose, songwriter (including "Blue Eyes Crying in the Rain") founder of Acuff-Rose Music publishing (d. 1954).

=== 1899 ===
- September 11 – Jimmie Davis, pop- and gospel-styled singer of the 1930s and 1940s ("You Are My Sunshine"), who later served as governor of Louisiana (d. 2000).
- December 14 – DeFord Bailey, harmonicaist and first African American performer on the Grand Ole Opry (d. 1982).

=== 1900 ===
- January 26 – Clayton McMichen, pioneering fiddle player and member of the Skillet Lickers (d. 1970).
- April 15 – J.L. Frank, music executive (d. 1952).

=== 1901 ===
- May 12 – The Duke of Paducah, comedian and star of the Grand Ole Opry (d. 1986).

=== 1902 ===
- December 24 – Don Law, music executive (d. 1982).

=== 1903 ===
- September 15 – Roy Acuff, pioneering singer-songwriter of the 1930s onward, founder of Acuff-Rose Music publishing, longtime member of the Grand Ole Opry (d. 1992).
- December 6 – Hugh Farr, member of the Sons of the Pioneers (d. 1980).

=== 1905 ===
- January 12 – Tex Ritter, singing cowboy and actor, father of actor John Ritter (d. 1974).
- March 6 – Bob Wills, western swing pioneer, frontman of the Texas Playboys (d. 1975).

=== 1907 ===
- September 29 – Gene Autry, singing cowboy and star of big-screen westerns; introduced Christmas standards including "Rudolph the Red-Nosed Reindeer" (d. 1998).

=== 1908 ===
- April 1 – Bob Nolan, member of the Sons of the Pioneers (d. 1980).
- June 4 - Texas Ruby (Ruby Agnes Owens), American pioneering country music female vocalist and musician (d. 1963).
- July 13 – Tim Spencer, member of the Sons of the Pioneers (d. 1974).
- October 20 - Stuart Hamblen, one of radio's first singing cowboys in 1926 (d. 1989).
- October 30 – Patsy Montana, early female solo star best known for "I Want to Be a Cowboy's Sweetheart" (d. 1996).
- November 10 – Paul Cohen, record producer, primarily with Decca Records (d. 1970)
- December 19 – Bill Carlisle, singer-guitarist and comedian, longtime member of the Grand Ole Opry (d. 2003).
- December 25 – Alton Delmore, one half of the Delmore Brothers (d. 1964).

=== 1909 ===
- March 29 - Moon Mullican (nicknamed "King of the Hillbilly Piano Players"), American country and western singer, songwriter, and pianist (d. 1967).
- April 17 - Tex Fletcher, Country singer and actor (d. 1987).
- April 29 – Karl Farr, member of the Sons of the Pioneers (d. 1961).
- May 9 - Don Messer, Canadian Country musician, band leader, radio broadcaster (d. 1973).
- May 10 – "Mother" Maybelle Carter, member of the original Carter Family in the 1920s and 1930s, and reformed group from the 1940s onward (d. 1978)
- November 8 - Scotty (Scott Greene Wiseman), part of the duo Lulu Belle und Scotty (d. 1999).

=== 1910 ===
- June 17 – Red Foley, guitarist and songwriter, one of country music's top stars of the 1940s and 1950s (d. 1968).
- August 22 – Rod Brasfield, comedian and star of the Grand Ole Opry (d. 1958).
- November 9 - Curly Fox, old-time and country fiddler, singer and country musician. Part of the Comedy-Oldtime-Country-Duo "Curly Fox and Texas Ruby" (d. 1995).

=== 1911 ===
- January 19 – Ken Nelson, American record producer and music executive; associated with acts including Merle Haggard, Buck Owens and Hank Thompson (d. 2008).
- February 12 – Stephen H. Sholes, record producer and executive with RCA Records (d. 1968).
- February 28 – Jim Denny, recording executive (d. 1963).
- September 13 – Bill Monroe, influential bluegrass singer and musician (d. 1996).
- November 5 – Roy Rogers, singing cowboy and actor who starred in many westerns; member of the Sons of the Pioneers (d. 1998).

=== 1912 ===
- May 17 – Grant Turner, announcer of the Grand Ole Opry (d. 1991).
- October 25 – Minnie Pearl, comedian and star of the Grand Ole Opry and television's Hee Haw (d. 1996).
- December 8 – Jack Stapp, influential country music manager (d. 1980).

=== 1913 ===
- October 20 – Grandpa Jones, "old-time" country singer, banjo player and comedian, star of television's Hee Haw (d. 1998).

=== 1914 ===
- February 9 – Ernest Tubb, the "Texas Troubadour", singer-songwriter and one of the pioneers of the honky tonk sound of country music (d. 1984).
- February 18 – Pee Wee King, singer-songwriter, best known for writing "The Tennessee Waltz" (d. 2000).
- May 13 – Johnnie Wright, singer-songwriter and husband of Kitty Wells (d. 2011).
- May 14 – Hank Snow, Canadian-born honky-tonk and western singer (d. 1999).
- June 19 – Lester Flatt, one half of the bluegrass duo Flatt and Scruggs (d. 1979).
- August 22 – Connie B. Gay, music executive (d. 1989).
- November 5 – Roy Horton, music executive (d. 2003).
- December 8 – Floyd Tillman, early honky-tonk singer of the 1940s (d. 2003).

=== 1915 ===
- June 1 – Johnny Bond, singer of the 1940s through 1960s, best known for his novelty songs about drunkenness (d. 1978)
- June 9 – Les Paul, one of the most important persons in the development of modern electric instruments (the electric guitar) and recording techniques (multitrack recording), which came into extensive use in country music starting in the 1950s. (d. 2009).
- July 16 – Speck Rhodes, comedian and musician best known for his work on The Porter Wagoner Show (d. 2000).
- October 21 – Owen Bradley, influential record producer of the 1940s through 1970s, primarily at Decca Records (d. 1998).

=== 1916 ===
- December 3 – Rabon Delmore, one half of the Delmore Brothers (d. 1952).

=== 1917 ===
- January 29 – Lloyd Perryman, member of the Sons of the Pioneers (d. 1977).
- March 1 – Cliffie Stone, record producer and publisher who was pivotal in the development of California’s thriving country music scene (d. 1998).
- November 29 – Merle Travis, singer-songwriter of the 1940s (d. 1983).

=== 1918 ===
- February 11 – Wesley Rose, music publisher and executive of Acuff-Rose Music (d. 1990).
- May 15 – Eddy Arnold, the "Tennessee Plowboy"; a pioneer in crossover music, his recording career spanned from the 1940s through 1990s (d. 2008).
- July 20 – Cindy Walker, songwriter whose hits spanned the 1940s through 1980s (d. 2006).
- October 16 – Stoney Cooper, bluegrass and gospel singer who best known for his series of recordings with wife, Wilma Lee (as Wilma Lee and Stoney Cooper), from the 1940s through early 1960s. (d. 1977)

=== 1919 ===
- February 13 – Tennessee Ernie Ford, singer and television star who enjoyed his greatest fame in the 1950s (d. 1991).
- August 30 – Kitty Wells, "The Queen of Country Music;" first major female country star, best known for "It Wasn't God Who Made Honky Tonk Angels" (d. 2012).
- December 25 – Curly Seckler, American bluegrass musician (Foggy Mountain Boys, Nashville Grass). (d. 2017)

== See also ==
- 1920 in country music
- List of years in country music
