= 1924 in country music =

This is a list of notable events in country music that took place in the year 1924.

== Events ==
- First broadcast of WLS Barn Dance in Chicago, led by the "Solemn Old Judge" George D. Hay.
- Beginning of the "Old Times Tunes" series on Okeh Records.
- Beginning of the "Special Records for Southern States" series on Vocalion Records.
- August 13 Vernon Dalhart records "The Prisoner's Song" and "Wreck of the Old 97."

== Top Hillbilly (Country) Recordings ==
The following songs were extracted from records included in Joel Whitburn's Pop Memories 1890-1954, record sales reported on the "Discography of American Historical Recordings" website, and other sources as specified. Numerical rankings are approximate, they are only used as a frame of reference.

Rank	Artist	Title	Label	Recorded	Released	Chart Positions
1	Wendell Hall	"It Ain't Gonna Rain No Mo'"	Victor 19171	October 12, 1923	November 23, 1923	US BB 1924 #1, US #1 for 6 weeks, 20 total weeks, 678,403 sales
2	Henry Whitter	"Wreck On the Southern Old 97"	Okeh 40015	December 12, 1923	May 1924	US BB 1924 #163, US #14 for 1 week, 1 total weeks
3	Vernon Dalhart	"Wreck On the Southern Old 97"	Victor 19427	August 13, 1924	November 1924	US BB 1925 #38, US #4 for 1 week, 8 total weeks, 1,085,985 sales
4	Fiddlin' John Carson	"Arkansaw Traveler"	Okeh 40108	April 3, 1924	June 1924	US BB 1924 #172, US #14 for 1 week, 1 total weeks
5	Fiddlin' John Carson	"You Will Never Miss Your Mother Until She is Gone"	Okeh 4994	November 7, 1923	February 1924	US BB 1924 #18, US #2 for 1 week, 8 total weeks
6	Uncle Dave Macon	"Keep My Skillet Good and Greasy"	Vocalion 14848	July 8, 1924	October 1924	
7	Eck Robertson and Henry Gilliland	"Done Gone"	Victor 19372	July 1, 1922	October 1924	
8	Fiddlin' John Carson	"Fare You Well, Old Joe Clark"	Okeh 40038	November 7, 1923	April 1924	
9	Ernest Thompson	"Little Rosewood Casket"	Columbia 216	September 9, 1924	November 1924	
10	Fiddlin' John Carson	"John Henry Blues"	Okeh 7004	March 24, 1924	November 1924	US BB 1924 #122, US #10 for 1 week, 1 total weeks
11	Wendell Hall and Carson Robison	"Whistling the Blues Away"	Victor 19338	May 1, 1924	October 1924	US BB 1924 #129, US #10 for 1 week, 1 total weeks
12	Eck Robertson and Henry Gilliland	"Sallie Johnson And Billy In The Low Ground"	Victor 19372	July 1, 1922	October 1924	
13	Riley Puckett	"Rock All Our Babies To Sleep"	Columbia 107	March 8, 1924	May 1924	
14	Henry Whitter	"Lonesome Road Blues"	Okeh 40015	December 12, 1923	May 1924	

== Births ==
- January 6 – Earl Scruggs, early bluegrass pioneer who, with Lester Flatt, formed the Foggy Mountain Boys (died 2012).
- February 16 – Jo Walker-Meador, Country Music Association Executive Director from 1962 to 1991 (died 2017).
- March 29 – Jimmy Work, 94, American country singer-songwriter ("Making Believe") (died 2018).
- April 21 – Ira Louvin, member of The Louvin Brothers (with brother Charlie). (died 1965)
- June 20 – Chet Atkins, session musician and record producer, primarily with RCA Records (died 2001).
- June 28 – George Morgan, pop-styled singer of the 1940s and 1950s; Grand Ole Opry stalwart and father of 1990s star Lorrie Morgan (died 1975).
- July 22 – Margaret Whiting, female country and pop vocalist of the 1940s and early 1950s; first female vocalist to top the Billboard country charts (1949's "Slippin' Around," as part of a duet with Jimmy Wakely). (died 2011)
- September 19 – Don Harron, Canadian comedian and playwright best known to country audiences as "Charlie Farquharson" on television's Hee Haw (died 2015).
