= 1923 in country music =

This is a list of notable events in country music that took place in the year 1923.

== Events ==
- More of country music's earliest recordings are recorded and released to the public such as Fiddlin' John Carson's two-sided recording "Little Old Log Cabin in the Lane"/"The Old Hen Cackled and the Rooster's Going to Crow" in September.
- In addition to Fiddlin' John Carson, Henry Whitter also produces his first recordings.
- The first radio barn dance is heard on WBAP in Fort Worth, Texas.

== Top Hillbilly (Country) Recordings ==
The following songs were extracted from records included in Joel Whitburn's Pop Memories 1890-1954, record sales reported on the "Discography of American Historical Recordings" website, and other sources as specified. Numerical rankings are approximate, they are only used as a frame of reference.

Rank	Artist	Title	Label	Recorded	Released	Chart Positions
1	A.C. (Eck) Robertson	"Sally Gooden"	Victor 18956	July 1, 1922	September 1922	National Recording Registry 2002
2	Fiddlin' John Carson	"The Little Old Log Cabin in the Lane"	Okeh 4890	June 14, 1923	September 21, 1923	US BB 1923 #97, US #9 for 1 week, 2 total weeks
3	Eck Robertson and Henry Gilliland	"Arkansaw Traveler"	Victor 18956	June 30, 1922	September 1922	National Recording Registry 2002
4	Eck Robertson and Henry Gilliland	"Turkey in the Straw"	Victor 19149	June 30, 1922	November 1923	
5	Fiddlin' John Carson	"Old Hen Cackled and the Rooster's Going to Crow"	Okeh 4890	June 14, 1923	September 1923	

== Births ==
- January 5 – Sam Phillips, recording executive and Sun Records founder, who was instrumental in fusion of country music and the newly emerging rock and roll music in the 1950s (died 2003).
- January 20 – Slim Whitman, country artist best known for his high-octave falsetto and yodeling abilities, and songs such as "Indian Love Call" and "Rose Marie" (died 2013).
- February 5 – Claude King, singer/songwriter best known for his million-selling 1962 hit "Wolverton Mountain" (died 2013).
- March 25 – Bonnie Guitar, musician (died 2019).
- May 27 – Redd Stewart, lead vocalist for Pee Wee King's band, co-writer of "The Tennessee Waltz" (died 2003).
- July 9 – Molly O'Day, female singer-banjo player of the 1940s, best known for "The Tramp on the Street." (died 1987).
- August 20 – Jim Reeves, velvet-voiced "Gentleman" singer whose pop-styled songs helped define the Nashville Sound (died 1964).
- September 17 – Hank Williams, singer-songwriter and honky-tonk music pioneer (died 1953).
- December 3 – Hubert Long, music executive (died 1972).

== See also ==
- 1923 in music
- List of years in country music
