= 1922 in country music =

This is a list of notable events in country music that took place in the year 1922.

== Events ==
- June 30 – A.C. "Eck" Robertson became the first fiddler and country musician on record when he recorded eight tracks for the Victor Talking Machine Company in New York City.
- September - Eck Robertson's "Sally Gooden" is released to the public. It would find later success in April of 1923.
- September 9 – First radio broadcast of Fiddlin' John Carson on WSB-Atlanta.

== Top Hillbilly (Country) Recordings ==
The following songs were extracted from records included in Joel Whitburn's Pop Memories 1890-1954, record sales reported on the "Discography of American Historical Recordings" website, and other sources as specified. Numerical rankings are approximate.

Rank	Artist	Title	Label	Recorded	Released	Chart Positions
1	Vernon Dalhart and the Criterion Trio	"Tuck Me to Sleep (In My Old 'Tucky Home)"	Victor 18807	September 1, 1921	November 1921	US BB 1922 #18, US #2 for 1 week, 7 total weeks, 1,040,811 sales
2	Vernon Dalhart	"Weep No More, My Mammy"	Columbia 3500	October 11, 1921	January 1922	US BB 1922 #59, US #5 for 1 week, 3 total weeks
3	Vernon Dalhart	"Dear Old Southland"	Edison 50905	December 23, 1921	May 1922	US BB 1922 #140, US #12 for 1 week, 1 total weeks
4	Al Bernard and Vernon Dalhart	"I Want My Mammy"	Columbia 3520	November 19, 1921	February 1922	US BB 1922 #114, US #10 for 1 week, 1 total weeks
5	California Ramblers	"My Honey's Lovin' Arms"	Vocalion 14329	April 6, 1922	May 1922	US BB 1922 #115, US #10 for 1 week, 1 total weeks

== Births ==
- July 26 – Jim Foglesong, Music Row executive who helped lay foundation for country music's boom period in the 1970s through early 1990s. (died 2013)
- December 20 — Geoff Mack, Australian singer-songwriter (died 2017)

== See also ==
- 1922 in music
- List of years in country music
