= CMT Most Wanted Volume 1 =

Studio album by Various Artists
- Released: September 16, 2003
- Genre: Country
- Label: Capitol

Professional ratings
Review scores
| Source | Rating |
|---|---|
| Allmusic | 3/5 stars |

CMT Most Wanted Volume 1 is a country music compilation album. Released on September 16, 2003 by Capitol Records, it includes fifteen country singles from 1999 to 2003. The album peaked at number 11 on the Billboard Top Country Albums chart.

== Track listing ==
| No. | Title | Performer(s) | Length |
|---|---|---|---|
| 1. | "19 Somethin'" | Mark Wills | 3:20 |
| 2. | "Beautiful Goodbye" | Jennifer Hanson | 3:40 |
| 3. | "Brokenheartsville" | Joe Nichols | 3:53 |
| 4. | "Burn" | Jo Dee Messina | 4:40 |
| 5. | "The Back of Your Hand" | Dwight Yoakam | 3:09 |
| 6. | "What a Beautiful Day" | Chris Cagle | 3:46 |
| 7. | "17" | Cross Canadian Ragweed | 5:20 |
| 8. | "You Can't Take It With You When You Go" | Rhonda Vincent | 3:33 |
| 9. | "Chrome" | Trace Adkins | 3:24 |
| 10. | "Cold One Comin' On" | Montgomery Gentry | 5:10 |
| 11. | "Maybe" | Alison Krauss | 3:49 |
| 12. | "What Was I Thinkin'" | Dierks Bentley | 3:50 |
| 13. | "I Need You" | LeAnn Rimes | 3:49 |
| 14. | "Raining on Sunday" | Keith Urban | 4:46 |
| 15. | "I'm Movin' On" | Rascal Flatts | 4:01 |

== Chart performance ==
| Chart (2003) | Peak position |
|---|---|
| U.S. Billboard Top Country Albums | 11 |
| U.S. Billboard 200 | 80 |
