= Jason Eady =

American singer-songwriter

Jason Eady (born January 23, 1975) is an American singer and guitarist, originally from Mississippi but now based in Texas. He is affiliated with the Texas country music scene, particularly through his evocation of an "old school honky-tonk" style of songwriting.

== Biography ==
Jason Eady grew up in Jackson, Mississippi, and has been influenced by bluegrass, Don Williams and Willie Nelson. He is married to, and frequently collaborates with, Texas singer-songwriter Courtney Patton.

Eady collaborated with Kevin Welch on his last three albums, AM Country Heaven from 2012, Daylight and Dark from 2014, and his self-titled album from 2017. AM Country Heaven debuted at number 40 on the Billboard Top Country Albums chart and number 9 on the Top Heatseekers chart.

Highway Prayer: A Tribute to Adam Carroll, released on Austin-based Eight 30 Records in late 2016, featured Eady's take on Carroll's "Errol's Song." Additionally, Eight 30 Records' Floater: A Tribute to the Tributes to Gary Floater featured Eady's version of "Stand Back Boys I'm Fixing to Care.

== Reviews ==
AllMusic gave Daylight and Dark a 4 star review and said, "In terms of quality, it belongs on a shelf next to Dwight Yoakam's Buenas Noches from a Lonely Room, Joe Ely's Letter to Laredo, and yes, even Willie Nelson's Phases and Stages". NPR's Ken Tucker contrasted Eady's traditionalism with Jon Pardi and said, "Ultimately, both Pardi and Eady have to confront the dilemma of all young country musicians: how to navigate the pop current that keeps country music commercially viable while connecting to a past that fewer and fewer listeners are aware of."

== Discography ==
=== Studio albums ===
Title	Album details	Peak chart positions	
Title	Album details	US Country	US Heat
From Underneath the Old	Release date: October 13, 2005; Label: self-released	—	—
Wild-Eyed Serenade	Release date: August 16, 2007; Label: self-released	—	—
When the Money's All Gone	Release date: September 8, 2009; Label: Smith Music Group	—	—
AM Country Heaven	Release date: April 10, 2012; Label: Underground Sound	40	9
Daylight/Dark	Release date: January 21, 2014; Label: Old Guitar Records	45	12
Something Together (with Courtney Patton)	Release date: December 6, 2016; Label: Mountain Valley Music	—	18
Jason Eady	Release date: April 21, 2017; Label: Old Guitar Records	—	18
I Travel On	Release date: August 10, 2018; Label: Old Guitar Records	—	16
To the Passage of Time	Release date: August 27, 2021; Label: Old Guitar Records	—	—
Mississippi	Release date: August 11, 2023; Label: Old Guitar Records	—	—
"—" denotes releases that did not chart
