= 1940 in country music =

This is a list of notable events in country music that took place in the year 1940.

== Events ==
- 1940 marked first year that sales exceeded 1929 levels
- April 4 – Ernest Tubb makes his first recordings for Decca Records, a label where he will remain for more than 30 years.

== Top Hillbilly (Country) Recordings 1940 ==
The following songs achieved the highest positions in Billboard magazine's 'Best Sellers in Stores' chart, monthly 'Hillbilly Hits' chart, supplemented by 'Joel Whitburn's Pop Memories 1890-1954' and record sales reported on the "Discography of American Historical Recordings" website, and other sources as specified, during 1940. Numerical rankings are approximate.

Rank	Artist	Title	Label	Recorded	Released	Chart Positions
1	Bob Atcher and Bonnie Blue Eyes	"You Are My Sunshine"	Vocalion 05370	January 17, 1940	February 1940	US Hillbilly 1940 #1, US Hillbilly #1 for 5 weeks, 37 total weeks
2	Bob Wills and His Texas Playboys	"San Antonio Rose"	Vocalion 04755	November 28, 1938	April 1939	US Hillbilly 1940 #2, Hillbilly #1 for 3 week, 18 total weeks, 1,000,000 sales
3	Gene Autry	"Goodbye Little Darlin' Goodbye"	Vocalion 05463	March 12, 1940	April 1940	US Billboard 1940 #264, US #20 for 1 week, 1 total weeks, US Hillbilly 1940 #3, US Hillbilly #1 for 2 weeks, 27 total weeks
4	Bob Wills and His Texas Playboys	"New San Antonio Rose"	Okeh 05694	April 16, 1940	August 1940	US Billboard 1941 #126, US #16 for 1 week, 1 total weeks, US Hillbilly 1940 #4, Hillbilly #1 for 2 week, 29 total weeks
5	Jimmie Davis	""You Are My Sunshine"	Decca 7004	February 5, 1940	March 24, 1940	US Hillbilly 1940 #5, Hillbilly #1 for 2 weeks, 18 total weeks, 1,000,000 sales, Grammy Hall of Fame 1999, Library of Congress artifact added 2012
6	Bob Skyles and His Skyrockets	"Only in Dreams"	Decca 5887	April 9, 1940	September 1940	US Hillbilly 1940 #6, Hillbilly #1 for 3 weeks, 15 total weeks
7	Gene Autry	"Were You Sincere"	Vocalion 05693	October 15, 1937	August 1940	US Hillbilly 1940 #7, Hillbilly #1 for 2 weeks, 18 total weeks
8	Shelton Brothers	"I'll Be Seein' You In Dallas, Alice"	Decca 5844	April 6, 1940	May 29, 1940	US Hillbilly 1940 #8, Hillbilly #1 for 3 week, 13 total weeks
9	Cliff Bruner And His Boys	"The Girl You Loved Long Ago"	Decca 5827	September 1, 1939	December 1939	US Hillbilly 1940 #9, US #1 for 2 weeks, 16 total weeks
10	Cliff Bruner And His Boys	"Sorry (I'll Say I'm Sorry)"	Decca 5860	April 8, 1940	June 20, 1940	US Hillbilly 1940 #10, Hillbilly #1 for 3 weeks, 20 total weeks
11	Jimmie Davis	"I'd Love to Call You My Sweetheart"	Decca 5803	February 5, 1940	February 1940	US Hillbilly 1940 #11, Hillbilly #1 for 3 week, 15 total weeks
12	Roy Newman And His Boys	"Take Me Back To My Home In The Mountains"	Vocalion 5486	December 1, 1938	April 1940	US Hillbilly 1940 #12, Hillbilly #1 for 3 week, 14 total weeks
13	Texas Jim Lewis and His Lone Star Cowboys	"Rock And Rye Polka"	Decca 5875	August 23, 1940	September 1940	US Hillbilly 1940 #13, Hillbilly #1 for 1 week, 14 total weeks
14	Gene Autry	"I'm Beginning To Care"	Vocalion 5257	September 12, 1939	January 2, 1940	US Hillbilly 1940 #14, Hillbilly #1 for 2 weeks, 13 total weeks
15	Texas Jim Lewis and His Lone Star Cowboys	"Seven Beers With The Wrong Woman"	Decca 5874	August 8, 1940	September 1940	US Hillbilly 1940 #15, Hillbilly #1 for 1 week, 20 total weeks
16	Shelton Brothers	"I’m a Handy Man to Have Around"	Decca 5833	April 6, 1940	May 1940	US Hillbilly 1940 #16, Hillbilly #1 for 2 weeks, 14 total weeks
17	Hank Penny's Radio Cowboys	"Cowboy Swing"	Vocalion 5438	November 9, 1938	March 1940	US Hillbilly 1940 #17, Hillbilly #1 for 2 weeks, 12 total weeks
18	Cliff Bruner And His Boys	"Jessie"	Decca 5769	August 26, 1939	December 6, 1939	US Hillbilly 1940 #18, Hillbilly #2 for 2 weeks, 19 total weeks
19	Ted Daffan's Texans	"Worried Mind"	Okeh 5668	April 25, 1940	July 1940	US Hillbilly 1940 #19, Hillbilly #1 for 2 weeks, 17 total weeks, sold over 350,000 copies
20	Bob Wills and His Texas Playboys	"Time Changes Everything"	Okeh 05753	April 15, 1940	August 1940	US Hillbilly 1940 #20, Hillbilly #1 for 2 weeks, 16 total weeks

== Births ==
- January 8 – Cristy Lane, Christian singer who also enjoyed secular success as a country performer in the late 1970s and early 1980s.
- June 23 – Diana Trask, Australian-born singer who enjoyed American success in the early 1970s.
- August 5 – Bobby Braddock, prominent songwriter with more than 40 years of success; later, producer for Blake Shelton.
- August 10 – Jerry Kennedy, prominent producer from the 1960s through early 1990s.
