= Tim Daniels =

English cricketer (born 1980)

Personal information
- Full name: Timothy John Daniels
- Born: 24 October 1980 (age 46); Brighton, Sussex, England
- Batting: Right-handed
- Role: Wicket-keeper

Domestic team information
- Years: Team
- 2001–2002: Oxford UCCE

Career statistics
Competition	First-class
Matches	3
Runs scored	18
Batting average	3.60
100s/50s	–/–
Top score	16
Balls bowled	–
Wickets	–
Bowling average	–
5 wickets in innings	–
10 wickets in match	–
Best bowling	–
Catches/stumpings	5/3
- Source: Cricinfo, 26 December 2011

Timothy John Daniels (born 24 October 1980) is an English former cricketer. Daniels is a right-handed batsman who fields as a wicket-keeper. He was born at Brighton, Sussex.

While studying for a degree at the University of Oxford, Daniels made his first-class debut for Oxford UCCE against Warwickshire in 2001. The following season he made two further first-class appearances against Worcestershire and Gloucestershire. Daniels struggled in his three first-class matches, scoring just 18 runs at an average of 3.60, with a high score of 16. Behind the stumps he took 5 catches and made 3 stumpings.
