= 1921 in country music =

This is a list of notable events in country music that took place in the year 1921.

== Births ==
- February 7 – Wilma Lee Cooper, bluegrass and gospel singer who best known for her series of recordings with husband, Stoney (as Wilma Lee and Stoney Cooper), from the 1940s through early 1960s (died 2011).
- April 1 – Arthur "Guitar Boogie" Smith, guitarist and banjoist best known for "Guitar Boogie" and "Dueling Banjos" (died 2014).
- June 26 – Donn Reynolds, Canadian-born singer-songwriter and country yodeler; first known for his Australian recordings in the late 1940s, established 2 yodeling world records during a performing career spanning over 40 years. (died 1997).
- August 8 – Webb Pierce, singer-songwriter; one of the most popular honky tonk singers of the 1950s and early 1960s. (died 1991).

== See also ==
- 1921 in music
- List of years in country music
