= 1975 in country music =

This is a list of notable events in country music that took place in the year 1975.

== Events ==
- March 13 — The rocky marriage of George Jones and Tammy Wynette ends in divorce.
- July 17 — A Russian-language version of Conway Twitty's 1970 hit, "Hello Darlin'" is played and broadcast to a worldwide audience as part of the Apollo-Soyuz Test Project. The song, which in Russian was called "Privet Radost," is a "gesture of goodwill" from the Apollo crew to the Soviet Union's Soyuz crew. Twitty worked with a language professor from the University of Oklahoma to record the phonetic Russian version of the song.
- August 8 — While mountain climbing at Ajax Mountain, Montana, Hank Williams, Jr. is involved in a catastrophic accident. He tumbles nearly 500 feet and is critically injured, suffering numerous facial and head injuries. His recovery takes nearly two years, during which time he undergoes a major cosmetic — and musical — overhaul.
- October — The defining moment in the recent debate over what defines country music – and each side's vision of the genre – comes at the Country Music Association awards. Charlie Rich, the 1974 CMA Entertainer of the Year, was selected to name the new Entertainer of the Year. When he opened the envelope, he took out his cigarette lighter, lighted the piece of paper with the winner's name on fire, and disgustedly announced the winner: "My good friend John Denver!" Denver, who was not present, was humbled at his award (but didn't know until later about Rich's actions).

=== No dates ===
- The deaths of three country music legends — Bob Wills, George Morgan and Lefty Frizzell — leave a huge void among fans.
- During a CBS documentary recorded and realised this year, Doolittle Lynn, husband of Loretta Lynn tells the world he “wants his wife to come home.”
- Six songs that reach No. 1 on the Billboard Hot Country Singles chart also reach the top of the Hot 100 chart: "(Hey Won't You Play) Another Somebody Done Somebody Wrong Song" by B. J. Thomas; "Before the Next Teardrop Falls" by Freddy Fender; "Thank God I'm a Country Boy" and "I'm Sorry," both by John Denver; "Rhinestone Cowboy" by Glen Campbell; and "Convoy" by C. W. McCall. In addition, several other songs that reach the top on one of the charts does very well on the other, including "Have You Never Been Mellow" and "Please Mr. Please" by Olivia Newton-John; "I'm Not Lisa" by Jessi Colter; Fender's "Wasted Days and Wasted Nights"; and "When Will I Be Loved" by Linda Ronstadt.

== Top hits of the year ==
=== Number-one hits ===
==== United States ====
(as certified by Billboard)

Date	Single Name	Artist	Wks. No.1	CAN peak	Spec. Note
January 4	The Door	George Jones	1
January 11	Ruby Baby	Billy "Crash" Craddock	1	2
January 18	Kentucky Gambler	Merle Haggard	1
January 25	(I'd Be) A Legend in My Time	Ronnie Milsap	1
February 1	City Lights	Mickey Gilley	1	2	Cover of Ray Price's #1 song in 1958.
February 8	Then Who Am I	Charley Pride	1
February 15	Devil in the Bottle	T. G. Sheppard	1		^{[A]}
February 22	I Care	Tom T. Hall	1	6
March 1	It's Time to Pay the Fiddler	Cal Smith	1		^{[B]}
March 8	Linda on My Mind	Conway Twitty	1
March 15	Before the Next Teardrop Falls	Freddy Fender	2		^{[A]}
March 29	The Bargain Store	Dolly Parton	1	3
April 5	I Just Can't Get Her Out of My Mind	Johnny Rodriguez	1	3
April 12	Always Wanting You	Merle Haggard	2	3
April 26	Blanket on the Ground	Billie Jo Spears	1	2	^{[C]}
May 3	Roll On Big Mama	Joe Stampley	1
May 10	She's Actin' Single (I'm Drinkin' Doubles)	Gary Stewart	1	4	^{[C]}
May 17	(Hey Won't You Play) Another; Somebody Done Somebody Wrong Song	B. J. Thomas	1	2	^{[A]}
May 24	I'm Not Lisa	Jessi Colter	1		^{[C]}
May 31	Thank God I'm a Country Boy	John Denver	1
June 7	Window Up Above	Mickey Gilley	1
June 14	When Will I Be Loved	Linda Ronstadt	1		^{[A]}
June 21	You're My Best Friend	Don Williams	1
June 28	Tryin' to Beat the Morning Home	T. G. Sheppard	1	2
July 5	Lizzie and the Rainman	Tanya Tucker	1
July 12	Movin' On	Merle Haggard	1	15
July 19	Touch the Hand	Conway Twitty	2	8
August 2	Just Get Up and Close the Door	Johnny Rodriguez	1	2
August 9	Wasted Days and Wasted Nights	Freddy Fender	2	2
August 23	Rhinestone Cowboy	Glen Campbell	3		^{[1], [2]}: Returned to Number One on September 13.
September 6	Feelins'	Conway Twitty and Loretta Lynn	1	2
September 20	Daydreams About Night Things	Ronnie Milsap	2	2
October 4	Blue Eyes Crying in the Rain	Willie Nelson	2	2	^{[A]}
October 18	Hope You're Feelin' Me (Like I'm Feelin' You)	Charley Pride	1	2
October 25	San Antonio Stroll	Tanya Tucker	1	2
November 1	(Turn Out the Light And) Love Me Tonight	Don Williams	1	5
November 8	I'm Sorry	John Denver	1	4	^{[B]}
November 15	Are You Sure Hank Done It This Way	Waylon Jennings	1	21
November 22	Rocky	Dickey Lee	1	9	^{[C]}
November 29	It's All in the Movies	Merle Haggard	1	11
December 6	Secret Love	Freddy Fender	1
December 13	Love Put a Song in My Heart	Johnny Rodriguez	1	3	^{[B]}
December 20	Convoy	C. W. McCall	6	4	^{[C]}: No. 1 song of 1976, as determined by Billboard.

Notes

- 1 No. 1 song of the year, as determined by Billboard.
- 2 Song dropped from No. 1 and later returned to top spot.
- A First Billboard No. 1 hit for that artist.
- B Last Billboard No. 1 hit for that artist.
- C Only Billboard No. 1 hit for that artist to date.

==== Canada ====
(as certified by RPM)

Date	Single Name	Artist	Wks. No.1	U.S. peak	Spec. Note
January 11	We're Over	Johnny Rodriguez	1	3	^{[B]}
January 18	What a Man My Man Is	Lynn Anderson	1		^{[B]}
January 25	The Door	George Jones	1
February 1	Big Red Jimmy	Jerry Warren	1	—	^{[C]}
February 8	Kentucky Gambler	Merle Haggard	1
February 15	(I'd Be) A Legend in My Time	Ronnie Milsap	1
February 22	Then Who Am I	Charley Pride	1
March 1	Devil in the Bottle	T. G. Sheppard	1		^{[A]}: RPM didn't publish on March 8.
March 15	It's Time to Pay the Fiddler	Cal Smith	1		^{[C]}
March 22	Linda on My Mind	Conway Twitty	1
March 29	Before the Next Teardrop Falls	Freddy Fender	1		^{[A]}
April 5	Everybody's Going to the Country	Hank Smith	1	—	^{[B]}
April 12	Have You Never Been Mellow	Olivia Newton-John	1	3
April 19	The Pill	Loretta Lynn	2	5
May 3	I've Never Been This Far Before	Carroll Baker	1	—	^{[A]}
May 10	Still Thinkin' 'bout You	Billy "Crash" Craddock	1	4
May 17	Roll On Big Mama	Joe Stampley	1		^{[C]}
May 24	Thank God I'm a Country Boy	John Denver	2		^{[1]}
June 7	Window Up Above	Mickey Gilley	1		^{[A]}
June 14	I'm Not Lisa	Jessi Colter	1		^{[C]}
June 21	I Ain't All Bad	Charley Pride	1	6
June 28	You're My Best Friend	Don Williams	1		^{[A]}
July 5	Lizzie and the Rainman	Tanya Tucker	1
July 12	Reconsider Me	Narvel Felts	1	2	^{[C]}
July 19	When Will I Be Loved	Linda Ronstadt	1		^{[A]}
July 26	Yellow House of Love	Patti MacDonnell	1	—	^{[C]}
August 2	The Hungry Fire of Love	Carroll Baker	1	—
August 9	Down by the Henry Moore	Murray McLauchlan	1	—	^{[C]}
August 16	Every Time You Touch Me (I Get High)	Charlie Rich	1	3
August 23	The Seeker	Dolly Parton	1	2
August 30	Rhinestone Cowboy	Glen Campbell	1
September 6	Please Mr. Please	Olivia Newton-John	1	5
September 13	The First Time	Freddie Hart	1	2
September 20	I'll Go to My Grave Loving You	The Statler Brothers	1	3	^{[A]}
September 27	If I Could Only Win Your Love	Emmylou Harris	1	4	^{[A]}
October 4	Say Forever You'll Be Mine	Dolly Parton and Porter Wagoner	3	5	^{[B] – Porter Wagoner}
October 25	Third Rate Romance	Amazing Rhythm Aces	1	11	^{[C]}: RPM didn't publish between November 1 and December 13.
December 20	Secret Love	Freddy Fender	2

Notes

- 1 No. 1 song of the year, as determined by RPM.
- A First RPM No. 1 hit for that artist.
- B Last RPM No. 1 hit for that artist.
- C Only RPM No. 1 hit for that artist.

=== Other major hits ===
==== Singles released by American artists ====
US	CAN	Single	Artist
19	30	41st Street Lonely Hearts Club	Buck Owens
18	38	Alimony	Bobby Bare
4	33	All Over Me	Charlie Rich
14	17	Another Woman	T. G. Sheppard
23	14	Back in Huntsville Again	Bobby Bare
—	12	Back to Down East Country	George Hamilton IV
—	10	Bad News	George Hamilton IV
7	4	Bandy the Rodeo Clown	Moe Bandy
7	13	The Best Way I Know How	Mel Tillis
51	20	The Biggest Parakeets in Town	Jud Strunk
12	30	Billy, Get Me a Woman	Joe Stampley
11	16	Bouquet of Roses	Mickey Gilley
5	6	Brass Buckles	Barbi Benton
22	15	The Busiest Memory in Town	Dickey Lee
19	—	Carolina Moonshiner	Porter Wagoner
13	45	Classified	C. W. McCall
29	20	Cowboys and Daddys	Bobby Bare
8	8	Deal	Tom T. Hall
11	9	Dear Woman	Joe Stampley
13	24	Don't Anyone Make Love at Home Anymore	Moe Bandy
4	2	Don't Cry Joni	Conway Twitty and Joni Lee
15	14	Don't Let the Good Times Fool You	Melba Montgomery
10	4	Dreaming My Dreams with You	Waylon Jennings
17	17	Even If I Have to Steal	Mel Street
17	29	Everything's the Same (Ain't Nothing Changed)	Billy Swan
17	46	The Farthest Thing from My Mind	Ray Price
20	17	Flat Natural Born Good-Timin' Man	Gary Stewart
12	2	For a Minute There	Johnny Paycheck
16	47	Forbidden Angel	Mel Street
12	21	Forgive and Forget	Eddie Rabbitt
10	17	Freda Comes, Freda Goes	Bobby G. Rice
10	7	From Barroom to Bedrooms	David Wills
16	8	From Woman to Woman	Tommy Overstreet
12	45	Funny How Time Slips Away	Narvel Felts
8	41	Great Expectations	Buck Owens
10	21	He Took Me for a Ride	LaCosta
13	28	He Turns It into Love Again	Lynn Anderson
8	10	He's My Rock	Brenda Lee
16	8	Heart to Heart	Roy Clark
13	29	Hello I Love You	Johnny Russell
14	8	Hello Little Bluebird	Donna Fargo
16	49	Here I Am in Dallas	Faron Young
10	5	Home	Loretta Lynn
15	12	Hoppy, Gene and Me	Roy Rogers
14	19	Hurt	Connie Cato
18	10	I Believe the South Is Gonna Rise Again	Tanya Tucker
13	20	I Can Still Hear the Music in the Restroom	Jerry Lee Lewis
2	6	I Can't Help It (If I'm Still in Love with You)	Linda Ronstadt
4	12	I Like Beer	Tom T. Hall
10	6	I Love the Blues and the Boogie Woogie	Billy "Crash" Craddock
11	42	I Should Have Married You	Eddie Rabbitt
13	—	I Still Believe in Fairy Tales	Tammy Wynette
14	16	I Still Feel the Same About You	Bill Anderson
9	—	I Want to Hold You in My Dreams Tonight	Stella Parton
20	47	I Wonder Whose Baby (You Are Now)	Jerry Wallace
5	20	I'd Like to Sleep Til I Get Over You	Freddie Hart
9	23	I'll Still Love You	Jim Weatherly
9	9	I'm a Believer	Tommy Overstreet
13	31	I've Got My Baby on My Mind	Connie Smith
14	4	I've Never Loved Anyone More	Lynn Anderson
7	12	It Do Feel Good	Donna Fargo
7	7	It Was Always So Easy (To Find an Unhappy Woman)	Moe Bandy
16	—	It's a Sin When You Love Somebody	Glen Campbell
23	13	It's All Over Now	Charlie Rich
9	6	It’s Midnight	Elvis Presley
12	7	Jason's Farm	Cal Smith
14	11	Lady Came from Baltimore	Johnny Cash
18	21	Let's Sing Our Song	Jerry Reed
10	32	The Letter That Johnny Walker Read	Asleep at the Wheel
4	5	Like Old Times Again	Ray Price
5	4	Little Band of Gold	Sonny James
6	9	A Little Bit South of Saskatoon	Sonny James
17	17	Look at Them Beans	Johnny Cash
3	3	Love in the Hot Afternoon	Gene Watson
5	46	Love Is a Rose	Linda Ronstadt
20	47	Love Is Strange	Buck Owens and Susan Raye
6	10	Loving You Will Never Grow Old	Lois Johnson
8	20	Lyin' Eyes	Eagles
20	32	Mathilda	Donny King
21	20	Memories of Us	George Jones
20	17	Mississippi You're on My Mind	Stoney Edwards
3	2	Misty	Ray Stevens
19	7	The Most Wanted Woman in Town	Roy Head
14	27	My Boy	Elvis Presley
3	5	My Elusive Dreams	Charlie Rich
3	2	My Woman's Man	Freddie Hart
21	14	Oh Boy	Diana Trask
11	48	One Monkey Don't Stop No Show	Little David Wilkins
4	10	Out of Hand	Gary Stewart
8	7	Penny	Joe Stampley
17	18	Pictures on Paper	Jeris Ross
14	17	Poor Sweet Baby	Jean Shepard
2	18	Rainy Day Woman	Waylon Jennings
6	17	Rock on Baby	Brenda Lee
32	19	Roll You Like a Wheel	Mickey Gilley and Barbi Benton
3	2	Roses and Other Love Songs	Ray Price
15	—	She Even Woke Me Up to Say Goodbye	Ronnie Milsap
13	5	She Talked a Lot About Texas	Cal Smith
10	—	Since I Met You Baby	Freddy Fender
13	43	Smokey Mountain Memories	Mel Street
17	17	Someone Cares for You	Red Steagall
19	—	Something Better to Do	Olivia Newton-John
18	36	Soulful Woman	Kenny O'Dell
18	11	Spring	Tanya Tucker
20	17	Stay Away from the Apple Tree	Billie Jo Spears
19	17	Stoned at the Jukebox	Hank Williams, Jr.
17	5	Storms Never Last	Dottsy
15	18	Susan When She Tried	The Statler Brothers
7	16	Sweet Surrender	John Denver
24	19	Thanks	Bill Anderson
6	4	That's When My Woman Begins	Tommy Overstreet
8	14	There I Said It	Margo Smith
10	5	There's a Song on the Jukebox	David Wills
10	9	These Days (I Barely Get By)	George Jones
19	15	This House Runs on Sunshine	LaCosta
4	2	The Ties That Bind	Don Williams
16	25	The Tip of My Fingers	Jean Shepard
9	—	Today I Started Loving You Again	Sammi Smith
6	3	Too Late to Worry, Too Blue to Cry	Ronnie Milsap
11	26	T-R-O-U-B-L-E	Elvis Presley
9	—	U.S. of A.	Donna Fargo
6	3	Warm Side of You	Freddie Hart
9	4	We Used To	Dolly Parton
11	10	Western Man	LaCosta
10	3	What in the World's Come Over You	Sonny James
5	11	What's Happened to Blue Eyes	Jessi Colter
9	8	Whatcha Gonna Do with a Dog Like That	Susan Raye
5	4	Where Love Begins	Gene Watson
14	8	Whoever Turned You On, Forgot to Turn You Off	Little David Wilkins
15	20	Why Don't You Love Me	Connie Smith
12	46	Wolf Creek Pass	C. W. McCall
4	5	Woman in the Back of My Mind	Mel Tillis
10	13	Word Games	Billy Walker
9	13	Write Me a Letter	Bobby G. Rice
6	17	Wrong Road Again	Crystal Gayle
14	46	You Are the One	Mel Tillis and Sherry Bryce
4	9	(You Make Me Want to Be a) Mother	Tammy Wynette
8	4	You Never Even Called Me by My Name	David Allan Coe
15	22	You're Not the Woman You Used to Be	Gary Stewart

==== Singles released by Canadian artists ====
US	CAN	Single	Artist
—	13	Anna Marie	Susan Jacks
—	14	Any Dream Will Do	Carlton Showband
—	6	Born to Be a Gypsy	Tommy Hunter
—	17	The Bricklin	Charles Russell
—	15	Bright Side of Tomorrow	Black Creek
—	20	City of Tears	Marg Osburne
—	9	Country Pride	Rick Newfield
—	9	Did You Hear My Song	Mercey Brothers
—	19	Easy Listenin'	Tim Daniels
—	3	Fly Raven Fly	Bruce Miller
—	10	Follow Your Heart	Jim and Don Haggart
—	4	Give My Love to Lady Canada	Bobby G. Griffith
—	7	God's People Are One	Dianne Leigh
—	9	Goodbye Old Man	Christenson Brothers
—	18	I Am the Words	Family Brown
—	14	I Knew Her Then	Ray Francis
—	20	Knock on My Door	Darlene Madill
—	12	Life and Love and You	R. Harlan Smith
—	19	Lonely Willow	Lee Roy
—	10	Maybe Tonight	Murray McLauchlan
—	5	Mother, Love and Country	Dick Damron
—	13	One More for the Road	Country Edition
—	4	Ooo Mama	Jerry Palmer
—	12	Pasadena's on My Mind	Lynn Jones
—	16	Roll It on Homeward	Linda Brown
26	20	Sanctuary	Ronnie Prophet
—	15	She's My Greatest Blessing	Ian Tyson
—	9	Someone Special	Canadian Zephyr
—	15	Summer of Our Love	Bruce Miller
—	20	Sunshine Lady	Bob Ruzicka
—	4	Sure Feels Good	Tim Daniels
—	16	That's Why I'm in Love with Life	Roy Payne
—	16	A Touch of God	Family Brown
16	—	What Time of Day	Billy Thunderkloud & the Chieftones
—	13	What'll I Do	Gary Buck

== Top new album releases ==
Album	Artist	Record Label
The Bargain Store	Dolly Parton	RCA
Blanket on the Ground	Billie Jo Spears	United Artists
Charley	Charley Pride	RCA
Dreaming My Dreams	Waylon Jennings	RCA
The Happiness of Having You	Charley Pride	RCA
Have You Never Been Mellow	Olivia Newton-John	MCA
I'm Jessi Colter	Jessi Colter	Capitol
Pieces of the Sky	Emmylou Harris	Reprise
Prisoner in Disguise	Linda Ronstadt	Asylum
Red Headed Stranger	Willie Nelson	Columbia
Rhinestone Cowboy	Glen Campbell	Capitol
Dolly: The Seeker/We Used To	Dolly Parton	RCA
Somebody Loves You	Crystal Gayle	United Artists
Tanya Tucker	Tanya Tucker	MCA

=== Other new album releases ===
Album	Artist	Record Label
Before the Next Teardrop Falls	Freddy Fender	ABC/Dot
Carolina Cousins	Dottie West	RCA
Country Girl	Jody Miller	Epic
Don't Let the Good Times Fool You	Melba Montgomery	Elektra
Dreaming My Dreams	Waylon Jennings	RCA
Every Time I Turn the Radio On/Talk to Me Ohio	Bill Anderson	MCA
Hank Williams Jr. and Friends	Hank Williams Jr.	MGM
High Priest of Country Music	Conway Twitty	MCA
Honey on His Hands	Jeanne Pruett	MCA
I Want to Hold You in My Dreams Tonight	Stella Parton	Soul, Country and Blues Inc.
Legend in My Time	Ronnie Milsap	RCA
Margo Smith	Margo Smith	20th Century Fox
Night Things	Ronnie Milsap	RCA
Old No. 1	Guy Clark	RCA
Pieces of the Sky	Emmylou Harris	Reprise
Poor Sweet Baby...And Ten More Bill Anderson Songs	Jean Shepard	United Artists
Sincerely, Brenda Lee	Brenda Lee	MCA
Vocal Group of the Decade	Tompall Glaser and the Glaser Brothers	MGM
Out of Hand	Gary Stewart	RCA

== Births ==
- June 15 — Rachel Proctor, singer-songwriter best known for her 2004 hit "Me and Emily"
- August 11 — Chris Cummings, Canadian country singer of 1990s and 2000s
- September 13 — Joe Don Rooney, member of Rascal Flatts
- November 20 — Dierks Bentley, new traditionalist-styled singer of the 2000s
- November 30 — Mindy McCready, popular country singer from the late 1990s (died 2013)
- December 18 — Randy Houser, late-2000s singer

== Deaths ==
- February 4 — Louis Jordan, 66, jazz and rhythm & blues pioneer who became the first African-American performer to have a No. 1 hit on the Billboard country charts (1944's "Ration Blues") (heart attack).
- February 17 — A.C. "Eck" Robertson, 88, pioneering American fiddle player, widely considered the first fiddler and country musician to record commercially.
- May 13 — Bob Wills, 70, leader of the Texas Playboys (complications from a stroke).
- July 7 — George Morgan, 51, country crooner of the late 1940s and early 1950s, Grand Ole Opry favorite and father of Lorrie Morgan (heart attack).
- July 19 — Lefty Frizzell, 47, honky-tonk pioneer of the 1950s (stroke).
- November 3 — Audrey Williams, 52, mother of Hank Williams Jr. (and ex-wife of Hank Williams Sr.)

== Country Music Hall of Fame Inductees ==
- Minnie Pearl (1912–1996)

== Major awards ==
=== Grammy Awards ===
- Best Female Country Vocal Performance — "I Can't Help It (If I'm Still in Love with You)", Linda Ronstadt
- Best Male Country Vocal Performance — "Blue Eyes Crying in the Rain", Willie Nelson
- Best Country Performance by a Duo or Group with Vocal — "Lover Please", Kris Kristofferson and Rita Coolidge
- Best Country Instrumental Performance — "The Entertainer", Chet Atkins
- Best Country Song — "(Hey Won't You Play) Another Somebody Done Somebody Wrong Song", Chips Moman and Larry Butler (Performer: B. J. Thomas)

=== Juno Awards ===
- Country Male Vocalist of the Year — Stompin' Tom Connors
- Country Female Vocalist of the Year — Anne Murray
- Country Group or Duo of the Year — Carlton Showband

=== Academy of Country Music ===
- Entertainer of the Year — Loretta Lynn
- Song of the Year — "Rhinestone Cowboy," Larry Weiss (Performer: Glen Campbell)
- Single of the Year — "Rhinestone Cowboy," Glen Campbell
- Album of the Year — Feelins', Loretta Lynn and Conway Twitty
- Top Male Vocalist — Conway Twitty
- Top Female Vocalist — Loretta Lynn
- Top Vocal Duo — Conway Twitty and Loretta Lynn
- Top New Male Vocalist — Freddy Fender
- Top New Female Vocalist — Crystal Gayle

=== Country Music Association ===
- Entertainer of the Year — John Denver
- Song of the Year — "Back Home Again", John Denver (Performer: John Denver)
- Single of the Year — "Before the Next Teardrop Falls", Freddy Fender
- Album of the Year — A Legend in My Time, Ronnie Milsap
- Male Vocalist of the Year — Waylon Jennings
- Female Vocalist of the Year — Dolly Parton
- Vocal Duo of the Year — Conway Twitty and Loretta Lynn
- Vocal Group of the Year — The Statler Brothers
- Instrumentalist of the Year — Johnny Gimble
- Instrumental Group of the Year — Roy Clark and Buck Trent

=== Hollywood Walk of Fame ===
Country stars honored in 1975

Rex Allen and Roy Clark

== Other links ==
- Country Music Association
- Inductees of the Country Music Hall of Fame
