= 1920 in country music =

This is a list of notable events in country music that took place in the year 1920.

== Births ==
- February 13 – Boudleaux Bryant, songwriter (with wife Felice) of many 1950s and 1960s hits (died 1987).
- March 10 – Kenneth C. "Jethro" Burns, of the Homer and Jethro comedy duo (died 1989).
- July 27 – Henry D. "Homer" Haynes, of the Homer and Jethro comedy duo (died 1971).
- December 19 – Little Jimmy Dickens, novelty singer and longtime member of the Grand Ole Opry (died 2015).

== See also ==
- 1920 in music
- List of years in country music
