= The Prisoner's Song =

Song by Vernon Dalhart
- B-side: "Wreck of the Old 97"
- Released: November 1924
- Recorded: August 13, 1924
- Studio: Victor Studios, New York City
- Label: Victor 19427
- Songwriter: Guy Massey

Audio sample
- Recording of "The Prisoner's Song", performed by Vernon Dalhart (1924): file; help

"The Prisoner's Song" is a song copyrighted by Vernon Dalhart in 1924 in the name of Dalhart's cousin Guy Massey, who had sung it while staying at Dalhart's home and had in turn heard it from his brother Robert Massey, who may have heard it while serving time in prison.

"The Prisoner's Song" was one of the best-selling songs of the 1920s, particularly in the recording by Vernon Dalhart. The Vernon Dalhart version was recorded at Victor Records in August 1924 and marketed in the hillbilly music genre. It has been suggested that it was one of the most popular records of the early 20th century. Although contemporary data shows that Victor pressed slightly over 1.3 million copies during the record's peak years of popularity, anecdotal accounts sourced from a 1940s promotional flyer report sales as high as 7 million. The song's publisher at the time, Shapiro, Bernstein & Co., reportedly sold over one million copies of the song's sheet music.

The lyrics are posted on the wall in the sheriff's office in the film Steamboat Bill, Jr., and the first verse is (silently) sung by Buster Keaton.

It was later performed by, among others, Hank Snow, Bill Monroe, Brenda Lee, and Sonny James(number 3 in Canada). The first verse was sung by Liberace at the end of an episode of the 1960s television show Batman in which Liberace played the double role of twin criminal brothers, both of whom ended the episode behind bars.

The song was mentioned in the book MASH: A Novel About Three Army Doctors (1968) by Richard Hooker. It was parodied by the two main characters simulating being in jail outside the commander's tent.

The song was included in Lyle Kessler's play Orphans and the film adaptation of the same name which the character of Harold drunkenly mumbles. The verse sung was altered to "if I had the wings of an angel, over these prison walls I would fly, Straight to the arms of my mutter, and then I'd be willing to die".

The song was an influence on Albert E. Brumley's popular hymn, "I'll Fly Away" (1929).

The song has since become something of a staple on the Irish and Scottish folk music scene and has been recorded by the Scottish folk trio The McCalmans on their live album Listen to the Heat.

== History ==
The events leading to the song's immense popularity began with a decision by Victor in 1924 to issue a recording of another song The Wreck of the Old 97, also titled The Wreck of the Southern Old 97, which had been a money-maker for other record companies. Nathaniel Shilkret, A&R man for Victor's newly established Country Records Department and his boss, Victor's Director of Light Music Eddie King agreed to have Dalhart as vocalist on the recording. Shilkret indicated that he felt it necessary to choose a good recording for the B-side of the record in order not to depend entirely on an eight-month-old hit and that he asked Dalhart for a suggestion. Dalhart said his cousin Guy Massey had a song, "The Prisoner's Song", that would be appropriate, and, on August 13, 1924, "The Prisoner's Song" was recorded, with Dalhart's singing backed by Victor singing, whistling artist Carson Robison on guitar, and on viola, Lou Raderman, a Victor violin artist and frequent concertmaster of Shilkret ensembles. This recording was issued as Victor 19427, and became a big hit.

Long-lasting controversy over the authorship of the song quickly arose. Dalhart copyrighted the song in Guy Massey's name, taking 95% of the author royalties for himself and giving Massey 5%. Shilkret protested, claiming that the song as Dalhart had brought it to him (Shilkret) was unusable, and that he rewrote the music. The Shilkret family fought unsuccessfully through the 1950s for author credit.

Guy Massey had heard the song from his brother Rob Massey, who had actually spent some time in prison and probably first heard the song there. Palmer cites a letter dated October 20, 1924, from Guy Massey to his brother Rob Massey and two of his sisters telling them that he agreed to a 5% stake in royalties because he thought there would not be any royalties. Guy also said that, even though the royalty contract did not mention Rob explicitly, he (Guy) would split the 5% evenly with Rob. Although Dalhart changed his story frequently when he told it in public, he sometimes also claimed to have rewritten the original that he got from Guy. At times there were claims made that Guy had written it and there were claims that Rob had written it. Another story claims the lyrics were carved into the wall of a cell in the old Early County Jail in Blakely, Georgia, by Robert F. Taylor, who was at one time held there.
