= 2012 in country music =

This is a list of notable events in country music that took place in 2012.

== Events ==
- February 29 – Branson, Missouri, a city famous for its country music-oriented tourist attractions, sustained damage from the Leap Day tornadoes. Three of Branson's 50-plus theaters are extensively damaged.
- May 11 – ABC picks up Malibu Country, starring Reba McEntire, to series. The new series debuts in November but is later cancelled in May 2013 after 18 episodes.
- May 21 – Scott Borchetta announces the signing of Tim McGraw to Big Machine Records.
- June 4 – Sony Music Nashville closes its BNA Records division after 21 years of operation; all its artists and staff are transferred to Columbia Nashville.
- June 18 – Gail Gellman, manager for Sugarland, confirms that member Jennifer Nettles is expecting a baby in November with husband Justin Miller.
- August – Randy Travis is involved in a number of legal incidents, including a drunk driving incident where he was found sitting nude outside his wrecked vehicle and – as police officers were trying to take him into custody – making verbal threats to injure and kill the officers, and a domestic disturbance approximately two weeks later.
- August 14 – George Jones announces plans for a 60-date farewell tour, titled The Grand Tour, for 2013.
- August 18 – Wynonna Judd's husband Scott "Cactus" Moser, who plays drums in both her road band and Highway 101, is involved in a motorcycle crash in South Dakota which results in the amputation of a leg.
- September 25 – Country legend Loretta Lynn celebrates her 50th Anniversary as a member of the Grand Ole Opry.
- September 26 – George Strait announces plans for a farewell tour, titled The Cowboy Rides Away, for 2013 and 2014. Strait revealed he will continue recording and will perform on special occasions.
- October 11 – Billboard changes its Hot Country Songs from an airplay-only chart to one that reflects both airplay and music downloads, similarly to the Hot 100. The airplay-only methodology is transferred to a new chart called Country Airplay. As a result of the new methodology, Taylor Swift's "We Are Never Ever Getting Back Together" – which had previously peaked at No. 13 – rebounds back up the chart and becomes the first No. 1 single under the new methodology. In the process, the song becomes the first to top both the country and Billboard Hot 100 charts since "Amazed" by Lonestar in March 2000 and – with nine weeks at No. 1 – is the longest running chart-topper on the country chart since "Almost Persuaded" by David Houston in 1966. The song also is the longest-running No. 1 country song ever by a female artist, topping Connie Smith's "Once a Day" (which logged eight weeks at No. 1 in 1964–1965).
- October 27- Sonny James Celebrates his 50th Grand Ole Opry anniversary
- November 1 – Luken Communications and Jim Owens Entertainment relaunch The Nashville Network (TNN) as a digital broadcast television network.

== Top hits of the year ==
The following songs placed within the Top 20 on the Hot Country Songs, Country Airplay or Canada Country charts in 2012:

| Songs | Airplay | Canada | Single | Artist | Reference |
|---|---|---|---|---|---|
| 1 | — | 1 | 5-1-5-0 | Dierks Bentley | |
| 17 | 58 | — | All Too Well | Taylor Swift | |
| 1 | — | 6 | All Your Life | The Band Perry | |
| 1 | — | 2 | Alone with You | Jake Owen | |
| 1 | — | 6 | Angel Eyes | Love and Theft | |
| 17 | — | 35 | Bait a Hook | Justin Moore | |
| 1 | — | 1 | Banjo | Rascal Flatts | |
| 7 | 3 | 1 | Beer Money | Kip Moore | |
| 6 | — | 5 | Beers Ago | Toby Keith | |
| 5 | — | 2 | Better Than I Used to Be | Tim McGraw | |
| 2 | 1 | 1 | Blown Away | Carrie Underwood | |
| 1 | — | 1 | Come Over | Kenny Chesney | |
| 8 | 4 | 35 | Come Wake Me Up | Rascal Flatts | |
| 2 | 2 | 5 | Cowboys and Angels | Dustin Lynch | |
| 10 | 5 | 8 | Creepin' | Eric Church | |
| 1 | 1 | 1 | Cruise | Florida Georgia Line | |
| 2 | — | 1 | Dancin' Away with My Heart | Lady Antebellum | |
| 14 | 5 | 22 | Did It for the Girl | Greg Bates | |
| 1 | — | 1 | Drink in My Hand | Eric Church | |
| 1 | — | 1 | Drink on It | Blake Shelton | |
| 1 | — | 1 | Drunk on You | Luke Bryan | |
| 17 | 10 | 31 | El Cerrito Place | Kenny Chesney | |
| 1 | — | 1 | Even If It Breaks Your Heart | Eli Young Band | |
| 7 | 3 | 10 | Fastest Girl in Town | Miranda Lambert | |
| 11 | — | 9 | Feel Like a Rock Star | Kenny Chesney and Tim McGraw | |
| 1 | — | 4 | Fly Over States | Jason Aldean | |
| 6 | — | 12 | For You | Keith Urban | |
| 15 | — | 45 | Glass | Thompson Square | |
| 1 | — | 1 | Good Girl | Carrie Underwood | |
| 12 | — | 42 | Got My Country On | Chris Cagle | |
| 4 | 1 | 2 | Hard to Love | Lee Brice | |
| 1 | — | 1 | Home | Dierks Bentley | |
| 19 | — | — | Home Sweet Home | The Farm | |
| 13 | — | — | I Almost Do | Taylor Swift | |
| 1 | — | 1 | I Don't Want This Night to End | Luke Bryan | |
| 18 | 17 | 30 | I Like Girls That Drink Beer | Toby Keith | |
| 4 | — | 28 | I'm Gonna Love You Through It | Martina McBride | |
| 3 | 1 | 1 | Kiss Tomorrow Goodbye | Luke Bryan | |
| 2 | — | 6 | (Kissed You) Good Night | Gloriana | |
| 1 | — | 13 | Let It Rain | David Nail featuring Sarah Buxton | |
| 3 | — | 6 | Love's Gonna Make It Alright | George Strait | |
| 7 | 5 | 4 | Lovin' You Is Fun | Easton Corbin | |
| 2 | — | 6 | No Hurry | Zac Brown Band | |
| 7 | 1 | 1 | The One That Got Away | Jake Owen | |
| 1 | — | 1 | Ours | Taylor Swift | |
| 1 | — | 1 | Over | Blake Shelton | |
| 1 | — | 1 | Over You | Miranda Lambert | |
| 3 | — | — | Over You | Cassadee Pope | |
| 1 | — | 1 | Pontoon | Little Big Town | |
| 6 | — | 25 | Postcard from Paris | The Band Perry | |
| 1 | — | 2 | Reality | Kenny Chesney | |
| 9 | — | 8 | Red Solo Cup | Toby Keith | |
| 17 | 17 | 50 | Shinin' on Me | Jerrod Niemann | |
| 1 | — | 1 | Somethin' 'Bout a Truck | Kip Moore | |
| 15 | — | 22 | Something to Do with My Hands | Thomas Rhett | |
| 1 | — | 1 | Springsteen | Eric Church | |
| 14 | — | 39 | Storm Warning | Hunter Hayes | |
| 4 | — | — | Stupid Boy | Cassadee Pope | |
| 1 | 1 | 1 | Take a Little Ride | Jason Aldean | |
| 16 | — | 17 | That's Why I Pray | Big & Rich | |
| 13 | — | 28 | This Ole Boy | Craig Morgan | |
| 2 | — | 14 | Time Is Love | Josh Turner | |
| 17 | — | 38 | The Trouble with Girls | Scotty McCreery | |
| 11 | 10 | 3 | Truck Yeah | Tim McGraw | |
| 24 | 17 | 46 | True Believers | Darius Rucker | |
| 1 | 1 | 1 | Wanted | Hunter Hayes | |
| 20 | — | 10 | Wanted You More | Lady Antebellum | |
| 1 | 13 | 16 | We Are Never Ever Getting Back Together | Taylor Swift | |
| 8 | — | 37 | Where I Come From | Montgomery Gentry | |
| 3 | 3 | 24 | Why Ya Wanna | Jana Kramer | |
| 11 | — | 4 | The Wind | Zac Brown Band | |
| 1 | — | 3 | A Woman Like You | Lee Brice | |
| 1 | — | 1 | You | Chris Young | |
| 1 | — | 6 | You Don't Know Her Like I Do | Brantley Gilbert | |
| 1 | — | 1 | You Gonna Fly | Keith Urban | |
"—" denotes releases that did not chart

== Top new album releases ==
The following albums placed within the Top 50 on the Top Country Albums charts in 2012:

| US | Album | Artist | Record label | Release date | Reference |
|---|---|---|---|---|---|
| 3 | 3 Pears | Dwight Yoakam | Warner Bros. Nashville | September 18 | |
| 2 | 100 Proof | Kellie Pickler | BNA/19 | January 24 | |
| 8 | Act of Valor: The Album | Various Artists | Relativity Music Group | February 21 | |
| 2 | All Over the Road | Easton Corbin | Mercury Nashville | September 18 | |
| 6 | Back in the Saddle | Chris Cagle | Bigger Picture | June 26 | |
| 1 | Blown Away | Carrie Underwood | Arista Nashville/19 | May 1 | |
| 4 | Carry Me Back | Old Crow Medicine Show | ATO | July 17 | |
| 2 | Casey James | Casey James | BNA/19 | March 20 | |
| 1 | Changed | Rascal Flatts | Big Machine | April 3 | |
| 2 | Cheers, It's Christmas | Blake Shelton | Warner Bros. Nashville | October 2 | |
| 2 | Christmas with Scotty McCreery | Scotty McCreery | 19/Interscope/Mercury Nashville | October 16 | |
| 4 | The Classic Christmas Album | Elvis Presley | RCA | October 2 | |
| 1 | Declaration of Independence | Colt Ford | Average Joe's | August 7 | |
| 1 | Dustin Lynch | Dustin Lynch | Broken Bow | August 21 | |
| 9 | Edens Edge | Edens Edge | Big Machine | June 12 | |
| 1 | Emotional Traffic | Tim McGraw | Curb | January 24 | |
| 2 | Endless Summer (EP) | Jake Owen | RCA Nashville | September 25 | |
| 10 | Family Man | Shooter Jennings | eOne Entertainment | March 13 | |
| 9 | For the Good Times | The Little Willies | Milking Bull | January 10 | |
| 9 | Free the Music | Jerrod Niemann | Sea Gayle/Arista Nashville | October 2 | |
| 9 | The Given | Wade Bowen | BNA | May 29 | |
| 2 | Hard 2 Love | Lee Brice | Curb | April 24 | |
| 1 | Here's to the Good Times | Florida Georgia Line | Republic Nashville | December 4 | |
| 4 | Heroes | Willie Nelson | Legacy | May 15 | |
| 4 | Hillbilly Jedi | Big & Rich | Warner Bros. Nashville | September 18 | |
| 1 | Home | Dierks Bentley | Capitol Nashville | February 7 | |
| 3 | Hope on the Rocks | Toby Keith | Show Dog-Universal Music | October 30 | |
| 5 | Jana Kramer | Jana Kramer | Elektra Nashville | June 5 | |
| 7 | Live Across America | Josh Turner | MCA Nashville/Cracker Barrel | August 27 | |
| 3 | Living for a Song: A Tribute to Hank Cochran | Jamey Johnson | Mercury Nashville | October 16 | |
| 4 | Love and Theft | Love and Theft | RCA Nashville | July 24 | |
| 3 | The Music of Nashville: Season 1 Volume 1 | Various Artists | Big Machine | December 11 | |
| 10 | New to This Town | Kix Brooks | Arista Nashville | September 11 | |
| 1 | Night Train | Jason Aldean | Broken Bow | October 16 | |
| 4 | Now That's What I Call Country Volume 5 | Various Artists | Universal Music | June 12 | |
| 4 | Old School New Rules | Hank Williams, Jr. | Blaster | July 10 | |
| 2 | On This Winter's Night | Lady Antebellum | Capitol Nashville | October 22 | |
| 6 | Opus Collection | Johnny Cash | Starbucks | May 29 | |
| 1 | Punching Bag | Josh Turner | MCA Nashville | June 12 | |
| 9 | Real Good Time | Aaron Watson | Big Label | October 9 | |
| 1 | Red | Taylor Swift | Big Machine | October 22 | |
| 9 | Release Me | Lyle Lovett | Curb | February 28 | |
| 7 | The Road | Aaron Lewis | Blaster | November 13 | |
| 5 | Small Town Family Dream | Josh Abbott Band | Pretty Damn Tough | April 24 | |
| 2 | Spring Break 4...Suntan City (EP) | Luke Bryan | Capitol Nashville | March 6 | |
| 1 | Thirty Miles West | Alan Jackson | ACR/EMI Nashville | June 5 | |
| 5 | This Ole Boy | Craig Morgan | Black River | February 28 | |
| 2 | A Thousand Miles Left Behind | Gloriana | Emblem/Reprise/Warner Bros. | July 31 | |
| 7 | Tomorrowland | Ryan Bingham | Axster Bingham | September 18 | |
| 1 | Tornado | Little Big Town | Capitol Nashville | September 11 | |
| 1 | Tuskegee | Lionel Richie | Mercury Nashville | March 27 | |
| 1 | Uncaged | Zac Brown Band | Atlantic/Southern Ground | July 10 | |
| 3 | Up All Night | Kip Moore | MCA Nashville | April 24 | |
| 1 | Welcome to the Fishbowl | Kenny Chesney | Blue Chair/Columbia | June 19 | |
| 8 | The Whippoorwill | Blackberry Smoke | Southern Ground | August 14 | |

=== Other top albums ===
| US | Album | Artist | Record label | Release date | Reference |
|---|---|---|---|---|---|
| 38 | 10 Great Songs | Trace Adkins | Capitol Nashville | April 3 | |
| 17 | 47th Annual Academy of Country Music Awards 'ZinePak | Various Artists | ZinePak LLC/Walmart | March 20 | |
| 16 | 190 Proof | The Lacs | Average Joe's | April 3 | |
| 19 | Adventus | The Departed | Underground Sound | November 13 | |
| 40 | AM Country Heaven | Jason Eady | Jason Eady | April 10 | |
| 32 | Amazing Grace | Kenny Rogers | Gaither Music Group | October 9 | |
| 12 | American Idol: Season 11: Highlights (EP) | Skylar Laine | 19 Recordings | July 3 | |
| 20 | And So It Goes | Don Williams | Sugar Hill | June 19 | |
| 16 | Ashes and Roses | Mary Chapin Carpenter | Zoë | June 12 | |
| 29 | Back Home Again: Gospel Favorites | The Oak Ridge Boys | Spring Hill | May 22 | |
| 31 | Beer for Breakfast | JB and the Moonshine Band | Average Joe's | March 6 | |
| 23 | Best Of: All My Rowdy Friends | Hank Williams, Jr. | Curb | March 27 | |
| 38 | Change My Mind | Billy Ray Cyrus | Blue Cadillac | October 23 | |
| 50 | Christmas Time's A-Coming | The Oak Ridge Boys | Gaither Music Group | September 25 | |
| 32 | The Classic Christmas Album | John Denver | RCA | October 2 | |
| 27 | The Classic Christmas Album | Willie Nelson | Columbia | October 2 | |
| 20 | Clear as Day/Christmas with Scotty McCreery | Scotty McCreery | 19/Interscope/Mercury Nashville | October 30 | |
| 12 | Country & Cold Cans (EP) | Dierks Bentley | Capitol Nashville | August 21 | |
| 44 | Country Christmas: 10 Great Songs | Various Artists | Capitol Nashville | September 25 | |
| 40 | Country: The Everly Brothers | The Everly Brothers | Sony Music | November 27 | |
| 35 | Country: George Jones | George Jones | Sony Music | November 27 | |
| 48 | Dandelion | Bart Crow | Smith Music Group | September 18 | |
| 48 | Dirt Road Communion | Chase Rice | Dack Janiel's | March 20 | |
| 20 | The Essential Alan Jackson | Alan Jackson | Arista Nashville | April 17 | |
| 14 | Famous for Killing Each Other: Music from and Inspired by Hatfields & McCoys | Kevin Costner and Modern West | Madison Gate | May 22 | |
| 35 | The Farm | The Farm | All In/Elektra Nashville | July 17 | |
| 14 | Goin' Down Rockin': The Last Recordings | Waylon Jennings | Saguaro Road | September 25 | |
| 30 | Good Guys | Bucky Covington | eOne Music | September 11 | |
| 14 | Goodbye Normal Street | Turnpike Troubadours | Bossier City | May 8 | |
| 35 | The Great Lost Hits | George Jones | Time–Life | April 24 | |
| 28 | The Greatest: The Number Ones | Johnny Cash | Legacy | August 7 | |
| 24 | His and Hers | Joey + Rory | Vangard/Sugar Hill | July 31 | |
| 11 | Hits and More | Martina McBride | RCA Nashville | January 17 | |
| 27 | I Am an Elvis Fan | Elvis Presley | RCA | July 31 | |
| 20 | Icon | Gary Allan | MCA Nashville | March 6 | |
| 18 | It'z Just What We Do | Florida Georgia Line | Big Loud Mountain | May 15 | |
| 23 | JT Hodges | JT Hodges | Show Dog-Universal Music | August 21 | |
| 32 | KIN: Songs by Mary Karr & Rodney Crowell | Various Artists | Vanguard | June 5 | |
| 42 | Lawless Soundtrack | Various Artists | Sony Music | August 28 | |
| 25 | Little Victories | Chris Knight | Drifter's Church | September 11 | |
| 30 | Live (EP) | Hunter Hayes | Atlantic Nashville | October 16 | |
| 16 | Long Gone Daddy | Hank Williams III | Curb | April 17 | |
| 33 | Midnight Special | Uncle Kracker | Sugar Hill | November 20 | |
| 23 | Mud Digger: Volume 3 | Various Artists | Average Joe's | June 12 | |
| 34 | The Music Inside: A Collaboration; Dedicated to Waylon Jennings, Volume Two | Various Artists | Average Joe's | February 7 | |
| 41 | Nashville, Vol. 1: Tear the Woodpile Down | Marty Stuart | Sugar Hill | April 24 | |
| 49 | Nobody in Nashville | Logan Mize | Big Yellow Dog | March 13 | |
| 13 | NOW That's What I Call Country Ballads | Various Artists | EMI | January 24 | |
| 48 | The Odessa Tapes | The Flatlanders | New West | August 28 | |
| 50 | Original Album Series | Blake Shelton | Warner Bros. Nashville | September 25 | |
| 19 | Playlist: The Very Best of Alan Jackson | Alan Jackson | Legacy | October 9 | |
| 18 | Playlist: The Very Best of Montgomery Gentry | Montgomery Gentry | Legacy | January 31 | |
| 30 | Red Wings and Six Strings | Frank Foster | Frank Foster | September 4 | |
| 38 | Science of Flight | Dirty River Boys | DRB Music | September 11 | |
| 42 | Shake It Down | Six Market Blvd. | 6mb | May 22 | |
| 15 | Songs We Wish We'd Written II | Pat Green | Sugar Hill | May 8 | |
| 41 | The Soul of Truth: Bootleg Vol. IV | Johnny Cash | Legacy | April 3 | |
| 47 | Suited Up and Ready (EP) | The Mavericks | Valory Music Group | May 29 | |
| 37 | Sunday Mornin' Singin' | Rhonda Vincent | Upper Management | July 10 | |
| 39 | Surrender | Roger Creager | Thirty Tigers | January 17 | |
| 48 | That's Why I Pray (EP) | Big & Rich | Warner Bros. Nashville | June 26 | |
| 45 | Them Idiots: Whirled Tour | Bill Engvall, Jeff Foxworthy and Larry the Cable Guy | Warner Bros. Nashville | March 13 | |
| 24 | Thomas Rhett (EP) | Thomas Rhett | Valory Music Group | August 28 | |
| 38 | The Time Jumpers | The Time Jumpers | Rounder | September 11 | |
| 38 | We Walk the Line: A Celebration of the Music of Johnny Cash | Various Artists | Legacy | August 7 | |
| 35 | Wreck & Ruin | Kasey Chambers and Shane Nicholson | Sugar Hill | October 23 | |

== Deaths ==
- January 20 – Larry Butler, 69, producer for Kenny Rogers and other artists (natural causes)
- March 28 – Earl Scruggs, 88, Bluegrass musician. (natural causes)
- April 25 – Mark McCoy, bassist for Micky & the Motorcars. (drowning)
- April 29 – Kenny Roberts, 84, American country singer and yodeler "I Never See Maggie Alone" (natural causes)
- May 6 – George Lindsey, 83, comedian-actor, co-star of Hee Haw
- May 29 – Doc Watson, 89, folk-styled singer and guitarist whose music spanned into country and bluegrass, among many other genres (complications from a fall and colon surgery).
- June 13 – Frances W. Preston, 83, music executive. President and CEO of Broadcast Music, Inc. from 1986 to 2004 (heart failure).
- July 3 – Andy Griffith, 86, comedian-actor and country-gospel singer. Best known for the TV series The Andy Griffith Show and Matlock.
- July 16 – Kitty Wells, 92, pioneering female country music superstar, best known for hits such as "It Wasn't God Who Made Honky Tonk Angels" (complications from a stroke).
- September 7 – Rollin "Oscar" Sullivan, 93, American country music entertainer that was the "Oscar" half of Lonzo and Oscar.
- September 30 – Raylene Rankin, 52, member of Canadian country group The Rankin Family. (breast cancer)
- October 21 – Tim Johnson, 52, songwriter best known for his number one hit "Do You Believe Me Now" for Jimmy Wayne and for his work with Rory Lee Feek of Joey + Rory (cancer).
- October 30 – Jan Crutchfield, 74, songwriter best known for "Statue of a Fool"
- November 21 – Phil Stone, 57, disc jockey at KMOD-FM in Tulsa, Oklahoma, co-creator of the Roy D. Mercer character (heart attack)
- November 23 – Frank Dycus, 72, songwriter of over 500 songs including the hits "Unwound" and "Gonna Get a Life".

== Hall of Fame Inductees ==
=== Bluegrass Hall of Fame Inductees ===
- Doyle Lawson
- Ralph Rinzler

=== Country Music Hall of Fame Inductees ===
- Hargus "Pig" Robbins (born 1938).
- Connie Smith (born 1941).
- Garth Brooks (born 1962).

=== Canadian Country Music Hall of Fame Inductees ===
- Johnny Burke
- Ralph Murphy

== Major awards ==
=== American Country Awards ===
(presented December 10 in Las Vegas, Nevada)

- Artist of the Year – Luke Bryan
- Male Artist of the Year – Luke Bryan
- Female Artist of the Year – Carrie Underwood
- Group/Duo of the Year – Lady Antebellum
- Touring Artist of the Year – Jason Aldean
- Album of the Year – Tailgates & Tanlines, Luke Bryan
- Breakthrough Artist of the Year – Jake Owen
- New Artist of the Year – Lauren Alaina
- Single of the Year – "I Don't Want This Night to End", Luke Bryan
- Male Single of the Year – "I Don't Want This Night to End", Luke Bryan
- Female Single of the Year – "Over You", Miranda Lambert
- Duo/Group Single of the Year – "We Owned the Night", Lady Antebellum
- Breakthrough Single of the Year – "You Don't Know Her Like I Do", Brantley Gilbert
- New Artist Single of the Year – "Wanted", Hunter Hayes
- Single by a Vocal Collaboration – "Remind Me", Brad Paisley feat. Carrie Underwood
- Music Video of the Year – "I Don't Want This Night to End", Luke Bryan
- Male Music Video of the Year – "I Don't Want This Night to End", Luke Bryan
- Female Music Video of the Year – "Over You", Miranda Lambert
- Duo/Group Music Video of the Year – "Pontoon", Little Big Town
- New Artist Music Video of the Year – "Wanted", Hunter Hayes
- Song of the Year – "Springsteen", Eric Church

=== Academy of Country Music ===
(presented April 7, 2013 in Las Vegas, Nevada)

- Entertainer of the Year – Luke Bryan
- Top Male Vocalist – Jason Aldean
- Top Female Vocalist – Miranda Lambert
- Top Vocal Group – Little Big Town
- Top Vocal Duo – Thompson Square
- Top New Male Vocalist – Brantley Gilbert
- Top New Female Vocalist – Jana Kramer
- Top New Duo/Group – Florida Georgia Line
- Top New Artist – Florida Georgia Line
- Album of the Year – Chief, Eric Church
- Single Record of the Year – "Over You", Miranda Lambert
- Song of the Year – "Over You", Miranda Lambert
- Video of the Year – "Tornado", Little Big Town
- Vocal Event of the Year – "The Only Way I Know", Jason Aldean, Luke Bryan and Eric Church

ACM Honors

- Cliffie Stone Pioneer Award – Emmylou Harris
- Cliffie Stone Pioneer Award – Ricky Skaggs
- Cliffie Stone Pioneer Award – Dwight Yoakam
- Cliffie Stone Pioneer Award – Billy Sherrill
- Crystal Milestone Award – Kenny Chesney
- Career Achievement Award – Vince Gill
- Jim Reeves International Award – Alan Jackson
- Mae Boren Axton Award – Gayle Holcomb
- Poet's Award – Bobby Braddock
- Poet's Award – Roger Miller
- Songwriter of the Year – Dallas Davidson

=== Americana Music Honors & Awards ===
- Album of the Year – This One's For Him: A Tribute to Guy Clark (Various Artists)
- Artist of the Year – Gillian Welch
- Duo/Group of the Year – The Civil Wars
- Song of the Year – "Alabama Pines" (Jason Isbell)
- Emerging Artist of the Year – Alabama Shakes
- Instrumentalist of the Year – David Rawlings
- Lifetime Achievement: Songwriting – Richard Thompson
- Lifetime Achievement: Performance – Bonnie Raitt
- Lifetime Achievement: Instrumentalist – Booker T. Jones
- Lifetime Achievement: Executive – Dennis Lord

=== American Music Awards ===
(presented November 18 in Los Angeles)

- Favorite Country Male Artist – Luke Bryan
- Favorite Country Female Artist – Taylor Swift
- Favorite Country Band/Duo/Group – Lady Antebellum
- Favorite Country Album – Blown Away, Carrie Underwood

=== ARIA Awards ===
(presented in Sydney on November 29, 2012)

- Best Country Album – Two Worlds Collide (The McClymonts)

=== Canadian Country Music Association ===
(presented September 9 in Saskatoon)

- Fans' Choice Award – Johnny Reid
- Male Artist of the Year – Dean Brody
- Female Artist of the Year – Carolyn Dawn Johnson
- Group or Duo of the Year – Hey Romeo
- Songwriter(s) of the Year – "Is It Friday Yet?", written by Gord Bamford, Roger Brown and Byron Hill
- Single of the Year – "They Don't Make 'Em Like That Anymore", Jason Blaine
- Album of the Year – Dirt, Dean Brody
- Top Selling Album – Own the Night, Lady Antebellum
- Top Selling Canadian Album – Fire It Up, Johnny Reid
- CMT Video of the Year – "In This House", The Stellas
- Rising Star Award – Kira Isabella
- Roots Artist or Group of the Year – Jimmy Rankin
- Generation Award – Taylor Swift

=== Country Music Association ===
(presented November 1 in Nashville)

- Single of the Year – "Pontoon", Little Big Town
- Song of the Year – "Over You", Miranda Lambert and Blake Shelton
- Vocal Group of the Year – Little Big Town
- New Artist of the Year – Hunter Hayes
- Album of the Year – Chief, Eric Church
- Musician of the Year – Mac McAnally
- Vocal Duo of the Year – Thompson Square
- Music Video of the Year – "Red Solo Cup", Toby Keith
- Male Vocalist of the Year – Blake Shelton
- Female Vocalist of the Year – Miranda Lambert
- Musical Event of the Year – "Feel Like a Rock Star", Kenny Chesney and Tim McGraw
- Entertainer of the Year – Blake Shelton

=== CMT Music Awards ===
(presented June 6 in Nashville)

- Video of the Year – "Good Girl", Carrie Underwood
- Male Video of the Year – "I Don't Want This Night to End", Luke Bryan
- Female Video of the Year – "Over You", Miranda Lambert
- Group Video of the Year – "We Owned the Night", Lady Antebellum
- Duo Video of the Year – "I Got You", Thompson Square
- USA Weekend Breakthrough Video of the Year – "The Trouble with Girls", Scotty McCreery
- Collaborative Video of the Year – "Remind Me", Brad Paisley and Carrie Underwood
- Performance of the Year – "Tattoos on This Town", Jason Aldean from CMT Artists of the Year

CMT Artists of the Year
(presented December 9 in Nashville)

- Jason Aldean
- Luke Bryan
- Kenny Chesney
- Eric Church
- Toby Keith
- Miranda Lambert
- Carrie Underwood

=== Grammy Awards ===
(presented February 10, 2013)

- Best Country Solo Performance – "Blown Away", Carrie Underwood
- Best Country Duo/Group Performance – "Pontoon", Little Big Town
- Best Country Song – "Blown Away", Josh Kear and Chris Tompkins (performed by Carrie Underwood)
- Best Country Album – Uncaged, Zac Brown Band
- Best Bluegrass Album – Nobody Knows You, Steep Canyon Rangers

=== Juno Awards ===
(presented April 21, 2013 in Regina)

- Country Album of the Year – Fire It Up, Johnny Reid

=== Hollywood Walk of Fame ===
Stars who were honored in 2012

Rascal Flatts and Vince Gill

== See also ==
- Country Music Association
- Inductees of the Country Music Hall of Fame
