= 2003 in country music =

This is a list of notable events in country music that took place in the year 2003.

== Events ==
- March 10 – During a concert in London, England, Dixie Chicks lead singer Natalie Maines said that the band was "ashamed the President of the United States is from Texas" (referring to Maines' hometown of Lubbock and President Bush hailing from the same state). The comment sparked intense controversy and outrage among Americans, including a large share of country music fans. Those who took offense to Maines' comments based their feelings on a number of grounds, including that the country was then on the verge of declaring war on Iraq (which happened less than two weeks later) and that Maines made the comments on foreign soil. Chicks' supporters, meanwhile, cited their right to free speech. Radio stations – perhaps riding the wave of fan sentiment – refuse to play their music on the air, including their then-current hit, "Travelin' Soldier" (which ironically was about a soldier who is about to go to war); some even sponsor anti-Dixie Chicks promotional events, such as disposing and destroying Chicks' compact discs and other merchandise. Maines, meanwhile, defended her stance during a televised interview with Diane Sawyer. Maines and her bandmates – Emily Robison and Martie Maguire – appeared nude (with private parts strategically covered) on the May 2 cover of Entertainment Weekly. Their bodies were covered with words such as "Saddam's Angels" and "Traitor."
- June - Ashley Gearing charts with "Can You Hear Me When I Talk to You?" at the age of twelve years and one month, breaks a record set by Brenda Lee in 1957 as the youngest female artist to have a single on the country charts.
- June 11 – Country Music magazine announces that it will cease publication, effective with the August/September 2003 issue. The final issue's cover artist was Martina McBride, as part of a salute to women in country music. The magazine's sister publication, Country Weekly, which had largely taken over the market for country music-related journalism, picks up part of the slack left by the closure of Country Music, both of which were published by American Media Inc.
- July – The Rascal Flatts video, "I Melt", comes under fire by conservative groups because it contains brief scenes of nudity, in particular sex scenes featuring band member Joe Don Rooney and model Christina Auria. Groups called for the video to be banned from airplay on CMT and Great American Country. Eventually, Rascal Flatts released an edited version of the video, which aired during daytime hours on the two country music-oriented networks.
- August 22 Goldie Hill celebrates her 50 Grand Ole Opry anniversary
- September 22 - The Trace Adkins video, "Hot Mama", gained notoriety for its risqué content involving a brief strip tease sequence despite that the song itself being a hit at the time. The song became controversial over 2 decades later due to an incident caused by DHS secretary Kristi Noem.
- December – The John F. Kennedy Center for the Performing Arts honors Loretta Lynn for her lifetime contributions to the arts.

=== No dates ===
- Throughout the year, country music was beset by the deaths of notable figures, including Johnny Cash, whose vastly influential musicianship transcended genres. His wife of 35 years (and longtime singing partner), June Carter Cash, had died four months earlier. Both had appeared in a CMT-aired interview, discussing their lives and careers; it was taped earlier in the year. Other notables that died during the year: Johnny Paycheck, Felice Bryant, Floyd Tillman, Wilma Burgess, Don Gibson, Dave Dudley and Gary Stewart.

== Top hits of the year ==
The following songs placed within the Top 20 on the Hot Country Songs charts in 2003:

US	Single	Artist	Reference
1	19 Somethin'	Mark Wills	
10	99.9% Sure (I've Never Been Here Before)	Brian McComas	
6	Almost Home	Craig Morgan	
18	At the End of the Day	Kellie Coffey	
1	The Baby	Blake Shelton	
16	Backseat of a Greyhound Bus	Sara Evans	
16	Beautiful Goodbye	Jennifer Hanson	
1	Beer for My Horses	Toby Keith duet with Willie Nelson	
2	Big Star	Kenny Chesney	
1	Brokenheartsville	Joe Nichols	
3	Celebrity	Brad Paisley	
5	Chicks Dig It	Chris Cagle	
10	Chrome	Trace Adkins	
5	Concrete Angel	Martina McBride	
2	Cowboys Like Us	George Strait	
3	Fall into Me	Emerson Drive	
9	A Few Questions	Clay Walker	
4	Forever and for Always	Shania Twain	
1	Have You Forgotten?	Darryl Worley	
4	Hell Yeah	Montgomery Gentry	
3	Help Pour Out the Rain (Lacey's Song)	Buddy Jewell	
1	I Believe	Diamond Rio	
16	I Can't Be Your Friend	Rushlow	
2	I Just Wanna Be Mad	Terri Clark	
1	I Love This Bar	Toby Keith	
2	I Melt	Rascal Flatts	
15	I Wish	Jo Dee Messina	
7	I Wish You'd Stay	Brad Paisley	
14	I'm Gonna Take That Mountain	Reba McEntire	
1	It's Five O'Clock Somewhere	Alan Jackson and Jimmy Buffett	
6	A Lot of Things Different	Kenny Chesney	
8	The Love Song	Jeff Bates	
3	Love You Out Loud	Rascal Flatts	
18	Lovin' All Night	Patty Loveless	
1	Man to Man	Gary Allan	
1	My Front Porch Looking In	Lonestar	
17	Next Big Thing	Vince Gill	
2	No Shoes, No Shirt, No Problems	Kenny Chesney	
19	On a Mission	Trick Pony	
3	Raining on Sunday	Keith Urban	
1	Real Good Man	Tim McGraw	
1	Red Dirt Road	Brooks & Dunn	
13	Rock You Baby	Toby Keith	
17	She Only Smokes When She Drinks	Joe Nichols	
2	She's My Kind of Rain	Tim McGraw	
5	Speed	Montgomery Gentry	
3	Stay Gone	Jimmy Wayne	
18	Streets of Heaven	Sherrié Austin	
11	Tell Me Something Bad About Tulsa	George Strait	
2	That'd Be Alright	Alan Jackson	
9	Then They Do	Trace Adkins	
1	There Goes My Life	Kenny Chesney	
17	There's More to Me Than You	Jessica Andrews	
14	There's No Limit	Deana Carter	
17	This Is God	Phil Vassar	
3	This One's for the Girls	Martina McBride	
1	Three Wooden Crosses	Randy Travis	
1	Tough Little Boys	Gary Allan	
1	Travelin' Soldier	Dixie Chicks	
13	The Truth About Men	Tracy Byrd	
12	Unusually Unusual	Lonestar	
12	Up!	Shania Twain	
8	Walk a Little Straighter	Billy Currington	
8	Walking in Memphis	Lonestar	
3	Wave on Wave	Pat Green	
4	What a Beautiful Day	Chris Cagle	
14	What the World Needs	Wynonna Judd	
1	What Was I Thinkin'	Dierks Bentley	
1	Who Wouldn't Wanna Be Me	Keith Urban	
16	Wrinkles	Diamond Rio	
4	You Can't Hide Beautiful	Aaron Lines	

== Top new album releases ==
The following albums placed within the Top 50 on the Top Country Albums charts in 2003:

US	Album	Artist	Record label	Release date	Reference
5	20th Century Masters: The Millennium Collection	Toby Keith	Mercury Nashville	Apr 15	
6	20th Century Masters: The Best of Brenda Lee - The Christmas Collection	Brenda Lee	MCA Nashville		
4	All I Want for Christmas Is a Real Good Tan	Kenny Chesney	BNA		
6	The American Farewell Tour	Alabama	RCA Nashville		
5	And the Crowd Goes Wild	Mark Wills	Mercury Nashville		
10	Best of Jeff Foxworthy: Double Wide, Single Minded	Jeff Foxworthy	Warner Bros.		
1	Buddy Jewell	Buddy Jewell	Columbia		
1	Chris Cagle	Chris Cagle	Capitol Nashville		
3	Comin' On Strong	Trace Adkins	Capitol Nashville		
4	Dierks Bentley	Dierks Bentley	Capitol Nashville		
2	The Dreamer	Blake Shelton	Warner Bros.		
3	A Few Questions	Clay Walker	RCA Nashville		
2	For the Last Time: Live from the Astrodome	George Strait	MCA Nashville		
1	From There to Here: Greatest Hits	Lonestar	BNA		
1	Greatest Hits	Jo Dee Messina	Curb		
3	Greatest Hits	LeAnn Rimes	Asylum-Curb		
1	Greatest Hits Collection, Vol. 1	Trace Adkins	Capitol Nashville		
2	Greatest Hits Volume II	Alan Jackson	Arista Nashville		
1	Greatest Hits Volume II (And Some Other Stuff)	Alan Jackson	Arista Nashville		
1	Have You Forgotten?	Darryl Worley	DreamWorks Nashville		
1	Honkytonkville	George Strait	MCA Nashville		
6	I'm Just a Girl	Deana Carter	Arista Nashville		
4	In the Mood: The Love Songs	Alabama	RCA Nashville		
7	Jimmy Wayne	Jimmy Wayne	DreamWorks Nashville		
6	Just Because I'm a Woman: Songs of Dolly Parton	Various Artists	Sugar Hill		
4	Live and Kickin'	Willie Nelson	Lost Highway		
9	Living Out Loud	Aaron Lines	RCA Nashville		
3	Long Black Train	Josh Turner	MCA Nashville		
1	Martina	Martina McBride	RCA Nashville		
1	Mud on the Tires	Brad Paisley	Arista Nashville		
7	My Baby Don't Tolerate	Lyle Lovett	Lost Highway		
4	Next Big Thing	Vince Gill	MCA Nashville		
4	Now	Jessica Andrews	DreamWorks Nashville		
7	On Your Way Home	Patty Loveless	Epic		
5	Pain to Kill	Terri Clark	Mercury Nashville		
8	Population Me	Dwight Yoakam	Audium		
1	Red Dirt Road	Brooks & Dunn	Arista Nashville		
8	Remembering Patsy Cline	Various Artists	MCA Nashville		
3	Restless	Sara Evans	RCA Nashville		
4	Room to Breathe	Reba McEntire	MCA Nashville		
2	See If I Care	Gary Allan	MCA Nashville		
1	Shock'n Y'all	Toby Keith	DreamWorks Nashville		
6	Stumble into Grace	Emmylou Harris	Nonesuch		
3	Top of the World Tour: Live	Dixie Chicks	Open Wide		
2	Totally Country Vol. 3	Various Artists	Warner Bros.		
5	The Truth About Men	Tracy Byrd	RCA Nashville		
2	Wave on Wave	Pat Green	Republic		
1	What the World Needs Now Is Love	Wynonna Judd	Asylum-Curb		
9	Worship & Faith	Randy Travis	Word/Curb		

=== Other top albums ===
US	Album	Artist	Record label
12	All the Best	Glen Campbell	Capitol Nashville
17	Bering Strait	Bering Strait	Universal South
33	Bill Gaither Presents: A Gospel Bluegrass Homecoming Volume One	Various Artists	Gaither
34	Bill Gaither Presents: A Gospel Bluegrass Homecoming Volume Two	Various Artists	Gaither
17	Billy Currington	Billy Currington	Mercury Nashville
15	Blue Collar Comedy Tour: The Movie Soundtrack	Various Artists	Warner Bros.
48	Bluegrass Today	Various Artists	Time Life
21	Brian McComas	Brian McComas	Lyric Street
21	The Christmas Guest: Songs and Stories of Christmas	Andy Griffith	Sparrow
20	Classic Country: Christmas	Various Artists	Time Life
45	Classic Country: The '80s	Various Artists	Time Life
11	CMT Most Wanted Volume 1	Various Artists	Capitol Nashville
40	Country Music	Marty Stuart	Columbia
32	Crazy: The Demo Sessions	Willie Nelson	Sugar Hill
44	Delbert McClinton Live	Delbert McClinton	New West
11	Drunk in Public	Ron White	Hip-O
30	Dusty Drake	Dusty Drake	Warner Bros.
30	Elvis: Christmas Peace	Elvis Presley	RCA
41	Elvis: Close Up	Elvis Presley	RCA
24	The Essential Willie Nelson	Willie Nelson	Legacy
29	Fate's Right Hand	Rodney Crowell	Epic
24	Farm Fresh Onions	Robert Earl Keen	Koch
23	For God and Country	Dolly Parton	Blue Eye
40	Full Exposure	Cory Morrow	Write On
28	Further Down the Old Plank Road	The Chieftains	RCA
44	Genuine	The Derailers	Lucky Dog
19	The Gospel Collection	George Jones	Bandit
40	Haggard Like Never Before	Merle Haggard	Capitol Nashville
46	Heart Full of Country	Various Artists	Capitol Nashville
37	Here's Your Sign Reloaded	Bill Engvall	Warner Bros.
50	Honesty	Rodney Atkins	Curb
24	Horsepower	Chris LeDoux	Capitol Nashville
16	I Love It	Craig Morgan	Broken Bow
39	I Want My Money Back	Sammy Kershaw	Audium
24	I'm One of You	Hank Williams, Jr.	Asylum-Curb
19	I've Always Been Crazy: A Tribute to Waylon Jennings	Various Artists	RCA Nashville
37	It'll Come to You... The Songs of John Hiatt	Various Artists	Vanguard
47	It's Just the Night	Del McCoury Band	McCoury
20	Jennifer Hanson	Jennifer Hanson	Capitol Nashville
43	Just an American Boy	Steve Earle	E-Squared
32	Live at the Charleston Music Hall	Ricky Skaggs & Kentucky Thunder	Skaggs Family
44	Livin', Lovin', Losin': Songs of the Louvin Brothers	Various Artists	Universal South
47	Lonesome, On'ry and Mean: A Tribute to Waylon Jennings	Various Artists	Razor & Tie
32	The Mavericks	The Mavericks	Sanctuary
15	Music Through Heartsongs: Songs Based on the Poems of Mattie J.T. Stepanek	Billy Gilman	Epic
25	Nashville Star: The Finalists	Various Artists	Columbia
14	Nut Sack	Rodney Carrington	Capitol Nashville
30	One Step Ahead	Rhonda Vincent	Rounder
18	The Other Side	Billy Ray Cyrus	Word/Curb
37	Pure Country Classics: The #1 Hits	Various Artists	UTV
14	Rainbow Man	Jeff Bates	RCA Nashville
31	Roy D. Mercer Hits the Road	Roy D. Mercer	Capitol Nashville
16	Rules of Travel	Rosanne Cash	Capitol Nashville
49	Show	Allison Moorer	Universal South
19	A Six Pack of Judd	Cledus T. Judd	Koch
37	The Songs of Hank Williams, Jr.	Various Artists	Warner Bros.
31	Steal Another Day	Steve Wariner	Selectone
22	Streets of Heaven	Sherrié Austin	Broken Bow
24	Three Pickers	Earl Scruggs, Doc Watson & Ricky Skaggs	Rounder
27	The Time-Life Treasury of Bluegrass	Various Artists	Time Life
39	Ultimate Clint Black	Clint Black	RCA Nashville
20	Ultimate Dolly Parton	Dolly Parton	RCA Nashville
33	Unearthed	Johnny Cash	Lost Highway
11	The Very Best of John Michael Montgomery	John Michael Montgomery	Warner Bros.
24	A Very Special Acoustic Christmas	Various Artists	Lost Highway
33	Wildwood Flower	June Carter Cash	Dualtone
48	You, Me and the Windshield	Marcel	Mercury Nashville

== Births ==
- April 15 – Sam Barber, up-and-coming country music singer and songwriter of the 2020s ("Straight and Narrow").
- September 29 – Callista Clark, country music singer and songwriter of the 2020s ("It's 'Cause I Am").

== Deaths ==
- February 19 – Johnny Paycheck, 64, legendary singer and songwriter, best known for "Take This Job and Shove It." (complications from asthma and emphysema)
- March 17 – Bill Carlisle, 94, singer-songwriter and comedian, lead singer of the Carlisles and stalwart of the Grand Ole Opry.
- April 22 – Felice Bryant, 77, songwriter and wife of collaborator Boudleaux Bryant.
- May 15 – June Carter Cash, 73, member of the Carter Family and wife of Johnny Cash (complications from heart surgery).
- June 30 – Sam Phillips, 80, founder of Sun Records and major player in emergence of rock and roll and its cross-genre popularity.
- July - Jayne White, 40 of duo JJ White.ayne
- August 22 – Floyd Tillman, 88, 1930s and 1940s singer instrumental in creating the genre's western swing and honky-tonk styles.
- August 26 – Wilma Burgess, 64, country vocalist of the 1960s best known for "Misty Blue."
- September 12 – Johnny Cash, 71, vastly influential singer/songwriter/guitarist whose music transcended musical boundaries; best known for hits like "Ring of Fire," "I Walk the Line," "Hurt," and "A Boy Named Sue" (diabetic complications).
- November 17 – Don Gibson, 75, influential songwriter (best known for "I Can't Stop Loving You") and singer who helped introduce the Nashville Sound (natural causes).
- December 16 – Gary Stewart, 58, rough, outlaw-styled country singer known for his drinking songs ("She's Actin' Single (I'm Drinkin' Doubles)") (suicide).
- December 22 – Dave Dudley, 75, best known for his 1960s-era truck driving songs, such as "Six Days on the Road" (heart attack).

== Hall of Fame inductees ==
=== Bluegrass Music Hall of Fame inductees ===
- J. D. Crowe

=== Country Music Hall of Fame inductees ===
- Floyd Cramer (1933–1997)
- Carl Smith (1927–2010)

=== Canadian Country Music Hall of Fame inductees ===
- Sylvia Tyson
- J. Edward Preston
- Fred King
- Charlie Russell
- Art Wallman

== Major awards ==
=== Grammy Awards ===
- Best Female Country Vocal Performance – "Keep on the Sunny Side", June Carter Cash
- Best Male Country Vocal Performance – "Next Big Thing", Vince Gill
- Best Country Performance by a Duo or Group with Vocal – "A Simple Life", Ricky Skaggs & Kentucky Thunder
- Best Country Collaboration with Vocals – "How's the World Treating You", Alison Krauss and James Taylor
- Best Country Instrumental Performance – "Cluck Old Hen", Alison Krauss & Union Station
- Best Country Song – "It's Five O'Clock Somewhere", Jim "Moose" Brown and Don Rollins
- Best Country Album – Livin', Lovin', Losin' – Songs of the Louvin Brothers, Various Artists (Producer: Carl Jackson)
- Best Bluegrass Album – Live, Alison Krauss & Union Station

=== Juno Awards ===
- Country Recording of the Year – Up!, Shania Twain

=== CMT Flameworthy Video Music Awards ===
- Video of the Year – "Courtesy of the Red, White and Blue (The Angry American)", Toby Keith
- Male Video of the Year – "Courtesy of the Red, White and Blue (The Angry American)", Toby Keith
- Female Video of the Year – "Concrete Angel", Martina McBride
- Group/Duo Video of the Year – "These Days", Rascal Flatts
- Breakthrough Video of the Year – "Brokenheartsville", Joe Nichols
- Hottest Male Video of the Year – "She's My Kind of Rain", Tim McGraw
- Hottest Female Video of the Year – "When the Lights Go Down", Faith Hill
- Cocky Video of the Year – "Courtesy of the Red, White and Blue (The Angry American)", Toby Keith
- Concept Video of the Year – "I'm Gonna Getcha Good!", Shania Twain
- Fashion Plate Video of the Year – "She's My Kind of Rain", Tim McGraw
- Video Director of the Year – "Concrete Angel", Martina McBride (Director: Deaton Flanigen)
- Special Achievement Award – Johnny Cash

=== Americana Music Honors & Awards ===
- Album of the Year – American IV: The Man Comes Around (Johnny Cash)
- Artist of the Year – Johnny Cash
- Song of the Year – "Hurt" (Trent Reznor)
- Instrumentalist of the Year – Jerry Douglas
- Spirit of Americana/Free Speech Award – Kris Kristofferson
- Lifetime Achievement: Songwriting – John Prine
- Lifetime Achievement: Performance – Levon Helm
- Lifetime Achievement: Executive – Sam Phillips

=== Academy of Country Music ===
- Entertainer of the Year – Toby Keith
- Song of the Year – "Three Wooden Crosses", Doug Johnson, Kim Williams
- Single of the Year – "It's Five O'Clock Somewhere", Alan Jackson and Jimmy Buffett
- Album of the Year – Shock'n Y'all, Toby Keith
- Top Male Vocalist – Toby Keith
- Top Female Vocalist – Martina McBride
- Top Vocal Duo – Brooks & Dunn
- Top Vocal Group – Rascal Flatts
- Top New Artist – Dierks Bentley
- Video of the Year – "Beer for My Horses", Toby Keith and Willie Nelson (Director: Michael Salomon)
- Vocal Event of the Year – "It's Five O'Clock Somewhere," Alan Jackson and Jimmy Buffett

=== ARIA Awards ===
(presented in Sydney on October 21, 2003)

- Best Country Album – Golden Road (Keith Urban)

=== Canadian Country Music Association ===
- Kraft Cheez Whiz Fans' Choice Award – Terri Clark
- Male Artist of the Year – Aaron Lines
- Female Artist of the Year – Shania Twain
- Group or Duo of the Year – Emerson Drive
- SOCAN Song of the Year – "Rocket Girl", Jason McCoy, Denny Carr
- Single of the Year – "I Just Wanna Be Mad", Terri Clark
- Album of the Year – Up!, Shania Twain
- Top Selling Album – Up!, Shania Twain
- CMT Video of the Year – "I'm Gonna Getcha Good!", Shania Twain
- Chevy Trucks Rising Star Award – Aaron Lines
- Roots Artist or Group of the Year – Sean Hogan

=== Country Music Association ===
- Entertainer of the Year – Alan Jackson
- Song of the Year – "Three Wooden Crosses", Doug Johnson, Kim Williams
- Single of the Year – "Hurt", Johnny Cash
- Album of the Year – American IV: The Man Comes Around, Johnny Cash
- Male Vocalist of the Year – Alan Jackson
- Female Vocalist of the Year – Martina McBride
- Vocal Duo of the Year – Brooks & Dunn
- Vocal Group of the Year – Rascal Flatts
- Horizon Award – Joe Nichols
- Video of the Year – "Hurt", Johnny Cash (Director: Mark Romanek)
- Vocal Event of the Year – "It's Five O'Clock Somewhere", Alan Jackson and Jimmy Buffett
- Musician of the Year – Randy Scruggs

=== Hollywood Walk of Fame ===
Stars who were honored in 2003

Earl Scruggs

=== Kennedy Center Honors ===
Country stars who were honored in 2003

Loretta Lynn

== Other links ==
- Country Music Association
- Inductees of the Country Music Hall of Fame
