= Discography of American Historical Recordings =

American record archive

The Discography of American Historical Recordings (DAHR) is a database catalog of master recordings made by American record companies during the 78rpm era. The 78 rpm era was the time period in which any flat disc records were being played at a speed of 78 revolutions per minute. The DAHR provides some of these original recordings, free of charge, via audio streaming, along with access to the production catalogs of those same companies. DAHR is part of the American Discography Project (ADP), and is funded and operated in partnership by the University of California, Santa Barbara, the National Endowment for the Humanities, and the Packard Humanities Institute.

== Database catalog ==
The database catalog is based mainly on materials stored at the successors of the original production companies, with some additional research. Catalogs compiled by specialists are also used.

- Victor Talking Machine Company releases, including RCA-Victor recordings, were made in the United States and Central and South America prior to 1939. This includes audio recordings that were leased from the Gramophone Company's recordings catalog. (Sources: Sony Music Entertainment Archive and the University of California, Santa Barbara).
- Recordings for the Columbia Records label, made between 1901 and 1934. (Source: Columbia Master Book Discography by Tim Brooks and Brian Rust).
- Pressings of the Berliner Gramophone Company from 1892 to 1900. (Source: Berliner Gramophone Records: American Issues 1892–1900 by Paul Charosh).
- Edison Records Imprints Diamond Disc and Needle Type releases between 1918 and 1934. (Primary and secondary sources provided by Thomas Edison National Historical Park).
- Pressings of the OKeh Records label, which were made from 1918 to 1934. (Source: Discography of OKeh Records 1918–1934 by Ross Laird and Brian Rust).
- Releases from Zonophone Records. (Sources: Discographies The American Zonophone Discography: Volume I, Ten- and Twelve-Inch Popular Series (1904–1912) and The American Zonophone Discography: Volume II, Seven-, Nine-, and First Ten-Inch Series (General Catalog, 1900–1905), the latter unpublished, both prepared by William R. Bryant and Allan Sutton).
- Recordings made by Decca Records between 1934 and 1974 (Source: The Decca Labels: A Discography by Michael Ruppli).
- Pressings of the Brunswick Records label. (Source: Brunswick Records: A Discography of Recordings, 1916–1931 by Ross Laird).
- Releases from Leeds & Catlin Records. (Source: Leeds & Catlin Records by William R. Bryant and Allan Sutton).
- Dust-to-Digital Foundation/Joe Bussard Collection.

== National Jukebox ==
The American Discography Project is partnered with the National Jukebox Project of the Library of Congress. As a result, Victor Talking Machine Company recordings from 1900 to 1925, and other recordings digitized by the University of California, Santa Barbara, are available on the National Jukebox.
