= Eck Robertson =

American old-time fiddler player

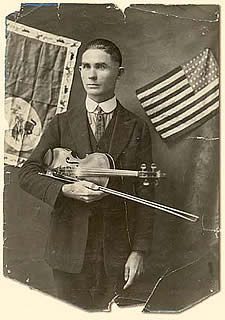

Background information
- Born: Alexander Campbell Robertson; November 20, 1887; Delaney, Arkansas, United States
- Origin: Amarillo, Texas
- Died: February 15, 1975 (aged 87) Borger, Texas, United States
- Genres: Country
- Occupations: Musician, piano tuner
- Instruments: Fiddle, Banjo, Guitar
- Years active: 1920s – 1960s
- Labels: Victor, County

Alexander Campbell "Eck" Robertson (born November 20, 1887, in Delaney, Arkansas, died February 15, 1975, in Borger, Texas) was an American fiddle player, mostly known for commercially recording the first country music songs in 1922 with Henry Gilliland (1845 - 1924).

== Early life ==
Robertson was born in Arkansas and grew up on a farm in the Texas panhandle where his family moved when he was three years old. His father, grandfather and uncles were fiddlers who competed in local contests. His father, a veteran of the Civil War, was also a farmer, and later quit fiddling to become a preacher. At the age of five, Robertson began learning to play the fiddle, and later learned banjo and guitar. In 1904, at the age of 16, he decided to become a professional musician and left home to travel with a medicine show through Indian Territory. In 1906, he married and settled in Vernon, Texas, and became a piano tuner for the Total Line Music Company.

== Recordings ==
"Arkansaw Traveler"
Robertson's 1922 recording of "The Arkansas Traveler"

Robertson and his wife Nettie performed at silent movie theaters and fiddling contests through the region. As the son of a Confederate veteran, Robertson was able to attend the annual Old Confederate Soldiers' Reunions across the South, and became a regular performer at these events. He met 74-year-old fiddler Henry C. Gilliland at one of these reunions, and the two began performing together. After the reunion in June 1922, Gilliland and Robertson traveled to New York City, auditioned for and received a recording contract with the Victor Talking Machine Company. On Friday, June 30, 1922, Robertson and Gilliland recorded four fiddle duets for Victor. These probably represent the first commercial recordings of country music performers. Two of them, "Arkansaw Traveler" and "Turkey in the Straw", were released on Victor. Two others, "Forked Deer" and "Apple Blossom", were never issued. At the company's request, Robertson returned the next day, July 1, without Gilliland and recorded six additional sides. Four of them - "Sallie Gooden", "Ragtime Annie", "Sally Johnson/Billy in the Low Ground" and "Done Gone" - were released on Victor over the next two years. The other two, "General Logan Reel/Dominion Hornpipe" and "Brilliancy and Cheatum", remain unissued. Robertson's rendition of "Sallie Gooden" is now a classic since he played the traditional fiddle tune followed by 12 variations.

Robertson's first record, with his solo "Sallie Gooden" on one side and duet "Arkansaw Traveler" on the other, was released on September 1, 1922, but was not widely circulated until the spring of 1923. Sales figures are not known, but Victor did not promote the record strongly. His next two records were released in 1923 and 1924, but only after the summer of 1923, when Fiddlin' John Carson's recordings on Okeh Records kicked off a boom in old-time country music record sales. In 1925, Victor started using a new electrical recording process, but Robertson's 1922 acoustically made recordings continued to be made available for several years, being listed in “The Catalog of Victor Records 1930”.

Robertson approached Victor about recording again, and in 1929 arranged to meet a Victor field recording engineer in Dallas, Texas. This time he included his wife Nettie on guitar, his daughter Daphne on tenor guitar and his son Dueron on tenor banjo. On August 12, 1929, the group recorded four fiddle tunes - "Texas Wagoner", "There's a Brown Skin Gal Down the Road", "Amarillo Waltz" and "Brown Kelly Waltz". On October 10, the Robertson family band returned to Dallas and recorded two fiddle duets with Texas fiddler J. B. Cranfill, "Great Big Taters" and "Run Boy Run". Two additional tunes were recorded that evening, "Apple Blossom" and "My Frog Ain't Got No Blues", but were not issued. The next day, October 11, the band recorded "Brilliancy Medley", released in September 1930, and the ballad "The Island Unknown", released in December 1929. That day the band also recorded three additional sides that were not released - "My Experience on the Ranch" and remakes of "Arkansaw Traveler" and "Sallie Gooden".

The week of September 20, 1940, Robertson recorded 100 fiddle tunes at Jack Sellers Studios in Dallas, Texas. Unfortunately, there is no song listing from these sessions, and none of the tunes have ever surfaced.

Robertson continued to perform extensively at dances, theaters, fiddlers' conventions and on radio. In 1963, John Cohen, Mike Seeger and Tracy Schwarz visited Robertson at his home in Amarillo, Texas and taped some of his music, which was released on County Records as Eck Robertson, Famous Cowboy Fiddler. Robertson appeared at the UCLA Folk Festival in 1964, and at the Newport Folk Festival in 1965, accompanied by the New Lost City Ramblers.

Robertson died in 1975 in Borger, Texas and was interred at the Westlawn Memorial Park Cemetery. His tombstone is engraved "World's Champion Fiddler."

== Discography ==
=== 78 RPM ===
Year	Title	Label	Number	Notes
1922	"Sallie Gooden" / "Arkansaw Traveler"	Victor	18956	Recorded 7/1/1922 and 6/30/1922, B side duet with Henry C. Gilliland
1923	"Turkey in the Straw" / "Ragtime Annie"	Victor	19149	Recorded 6/30/1922 and 7/1/1922, A side duet with Henry C. Gilliland
1924	"Sally Johnson/Billy in the Low Ground" / "Done Gone"	Victor	19372	Recorded 7/1/1922, with pianist Nat Shilkret
1929	"Texas Wagoner" / "There's a Brown Skin Gal Down the Road"	Victor	V40145	Recorded 8/12/1929, with wife, son and daughter.
1929	"The Island Unknown Part 1" / "The Island Unknown Part 2"	Victor	V40166	Recorded 10/11/1929, with wife, son and daughter.
1929	"Run Boy Run" / "Great Big Taters"	Victor	V40205	Recorded 10/10/1929, with J.B. Cranfill
1930	"Brilliancy Medley" / "Amarillo Waltz"	Victor	V40298	Recorded 10/11/1929 and 8/12/1929, with wife, son and daughter.
1930	"Brown Kelly Waltz Part 1" / "Brown Kelly Waltz Part 2"	Victor	V40334	Recorded 8/12/1929, with wife, son and daughter. Reissued as Bluebird 5777 and Montgomery Ward 4908

=== Albums ===
Year	Title	Label	Number	Notes
1989	Eck Robertson, Famous Cowboy Fiddler	County	202	1963 field recording, Amarillo, Texas

=== Compilations and reissues ===
Year	Title	Label	Number	Notes
1976	Master Fiddler	Sonyatone	STR-201	Reissue of the Victor recordings, 1922-1929
1998	Old-Time Texas Fiddler	County	CO-3515-CD	Reissue of the Victor recordings, 1922-1929
