= Blue yodeling =

Musical style

Blue yodeling (meaning 'melancholy yodeling') is a musical style that essentially consists of a combination of elements of blues and old-time music, enriched with characteristic yodelings. Initially sometimes referred to as "yodeling blues", it reached its greatest popularity during the 1920s and 1930s in the United States, Canada and Australia.

The name goes back to the song title "Blue Yodel", under which the American singer Jimmie Rodgers published a total of twelve numbered songs that were groundbreaking for the development of early country music. In addition to Rodgers, the later “Singing Cowboy” Gene Autry and the honky-tonk musicians Ernest Tubb, Little Joe Hunt of the Rhythm Ranch Hands Recording Studio and Hank Snow were outstanding representatives of the genre.

== History ==
=== The beginnings ===
==== Yodeling in the United States ====
Yodeling seems to be an Alpine tradition in Europe. However, it became popular in large cities such as Vienna from around 1830 as an entertainment interlude in the Viennese suburban theaters and Singspielhalles and was only subsequently brought to the countryside by guest artists. Various immigrant groups also brought it to the United States as a seemingly traditional means of identification. The first encounter with Anglo-American musical styles is said to have taken place in the early 19th century, when British and Irish settlers met German-speaking immigrants in the foothills of the Appalachian Mountains. In Emma Bell Miles' (1879–1919) 1905 collection of essays The Spirit of the Mountains, in which she describes life in the Southern Appalachians, yodeling is mentioned in several places, such as in the description of the difference between men and women:: “His first songs are yodels. Then he learns dance tunes, and songs of hunting and fighting and drinking, …''

Triggered by successful guest performances by Austrian and Swiss artists who called themselves "Tyrolese Minstrels" or "Alpine Minstrels", for example, a steady rise in popularity can be traced from the 1830s onwards. Yodeling performances were often advertised as a special curiosity. Tom Christian, known as the "Yodeling Minstrel", first appeared in public around 1847; the first recordings of a yodeler were made by L.W. Lipp in 1892. In 1905, the Swiss tenor Arnold Inauen made the first commercial recordings for Columbia Records, albeit still in the Alpine style.

At the same time, a yodeling style developed in the environment of roving Minstrel and Vaudeville shows, which was particularly supported by African Americans and was strongly influenced by elements of the Blues, especially the so-called Delta Blues and the Jazz predecessor Ragtime. Outstanding representatives were Monroe Tabor ("The Yodeling Bell Boy"), Beulah Henderson ("America's Only Colored Lady Yodeler") or Charles Anderson ("The Yodeler Blues Singer"). In fundamental research, historians Lynn Abbott and Doug Seroff have proven the influence of African-American artists and traditions in this area. This influence is said to lie, among other things, in typical inarticulate calls with simultaneous breaking of the voice, the field hollers, from which the so-called "black falsetto" has developed. The term falsetto refers to the falsetto voice. The Texan country traditionalist and passionate yodeller Don Walser later released his "Dixie Blues" paid homage to this legacy.

The "blue yodel syntax", the combination of blues and yodeling, first appeared in 1923 in the song of the same name composed by Clarence Williams, which was first recorded by Williams' wife Eva Taylor together with Sara Martin, and later in the same year by Bessie Smith. The lyrics read, among other things "I’m gonna yodel my blues away". However, yodeling is only hinted at in both recordings.

George P. Watson: "Sleep, Baby, Sleep" (1911)

Well-known interpreters of this newly developing style were the white vaudeville artist George P. Watson and his colleague Emmett Miller. The latter was one of the best-known blackface artists of his time, i. e., he performed in make-up as a person of color. In 1925, he recorded one of the first versions of "Lovesick Blues" and successfully toured the country with minstrel shows, advertised as a "famous yodeling blues singer". He was known for breaking his voice within the words and elongating individual sounds, which was also called trick singing at the time. Watson first recorded yodeling songs on wax cylinders in 1895. The song he popularized, "Sleep, Baby, Sleep", recorded in German and English in 1911, became a classic of American yodel music, not least because Jimmie Rodgers, revered as the "father" of country music, used it in August 1927 during his first recording session. This song can be considered the linchpin of American yodeling: composed in 1896 by S. A. Emery, it had been recorded more than a dozen times before 1927, including by various old-time bands.

Milton Brown, one of the pioneers of Western swing, formed his first band with two friends in 1927: The Three Yodeliers. The repertoire consisted mainly of barbershop and contemporary pop songs, but also some yodeling songs, including Emmett Miller's "I Ain't Got Nobody". The further Brown's personal style shifted towards jazz, the less he devoted himself to yodeling. Fleming and Townsend helped pioneer the blue yodel duet through harmonizing with each other’s yodels.

With regard to the 1920s and early 1930s, the music journalist Nick Tosches distinguishes between various yodeling styles, including the "archaic 19th-century yodel", the minstrel yodel and the minstrel yodel. Century", the minstrel show yodel, which he calls "fake blue yodel" and characterizes as a "Swiss yodel with black content", and the pop-country yodel, as used by Jimmy Long in "Yodel Your Troubles Away" (1929).

The "revival experience" of Wilf Carter can be considered exemplary for the development of yodeling. Around 1915, when he was about ten years old, he saw a Swiss yodeller at a cattle drive who appeared as an additional attraction at a performance of "Uncle Tom's Cabin" and called himself "The Yodeling Fool". Here, the character of the yodelling performance as a novelty and curiosity was still clearly recognizable, which did not really fit in with the theme of the actual performance. At the same time, however, it hinted at the incipient transformation it would undergo in the traveling shows.

==== White country blues ====
At the same time, there was a growing tendency among white artists from the field of old-time music to take up African-American influences such as blues or jazz. The young Bob Wills developed western swing under these influences, while others concentrated more on the blues element and thus shaped a style that is now known as white country blues. In most cases, the influence of vaudeville was also clearly recognizable here. Outstanding representatives include the Allen Brothers, Frank Hutchison, Dock Boggs and Tom Darby. Their music can be seen as a link between blues and hillbilly or old-time music, but also shows how closely related the two styles were at the time.

In this context, some authors have raised the fundamental question of the motives that prompted white musicians to take up elements of African-American music in the first place, especially in the racist climate that prevailed in the southern states at the beginning of the 20th century. The fact that it was something new initially played a role. More important, however, were the possibilities it opened up. On the one hand, stylistically it made it possible to break out of well-trodden paths, many of which were still in 19th century patterns, such as the narrative ballad. The incorporation of the blues into their music was also a "liberation" for many white musicians from the clichés and constraints of "country" music at the time, allowing them to move into areas of content that had previously been taboo, "away from whitewashed cottages and gray-haired mothers". It can also be assumed that they simply enjoyed this type of music and held its original performers in high esteem.

=== Jimmie Rodgers: America's "Blue Yodeler" ===
In the field of what was then known as hillbilly or old-time music, attention was first drawn to yodeling in 1924 when Riley Puckett, who later helped shape the young genre as a member of the Skillet Lickers, recorded the title "Rock All Our Babies to Sleep" with a yodel interlude. In September 1925, Puckett also recorded "Sleep, Baby, Sleep", but subsequently moved away from yodeling again.

==== The turning point: "T For Texas" ====
However, the final breakthrough did not come until February 1928, when the former railwayman Jimmie Rodgers triggered a real yodeling boom with his first big hit "T For Texas (Blue Yodel)" and numerous artists began to copy his style down to the smallest detail.

Rodgers grew up in Mississippi, the cradle of the blues. Even as a teenager he wanted to become a professional singer, but his father persuaded him to take a "proper" job on the railroad, where he also worked. After Rodgers had to give up his job on the railroad due to his tuberculosis illness, he fulfilled his dream of a career as a musician, played in string bands, toured the southern states with vaudeville shows and also performed as a blackface artist. During this time, he came to the attention of producer Ralph Peer, who was looking for music in the traditional mountain or old-time style and organized test recordings in Bristol, Tennessee.

On August 4, 1927, Rodgers made his first recordings for Peer after falling out with his backing band, the Jimmie Rodgers Entertainers, the night before. In addition to "Sleep, Baby, Sleep", he also recorded the ballad "The Soldier's Sweetheart", which contains no yodels. What is particularly interesting here is that his yodeling style on "Sleep, Baby, Sleep" was still more in the style of George P. Watson and differs fundamentally from the later Blue Yodel. Both titles sold only with moderate success, but this was to change with "T For Texas".

At first, "T For Texas" had been little more than an embarrassment. Since Rodgers had not prepared enough of the "backwoods" pieces Peer wanted for his second recording session on November 30, 1927, he reluctantly decided to use one of Rodgers' "Blues Songs" as a stopgap. Rodgers himself had called the song "T For Texas", but it was published under the title "Blue Yodel". It was to be an overwhelming success and sold over a million copies. It also spawned eleven more Blue Yodels, as well as "Jimmie Rodger's Last Blue Yodel", which was not released until after his death in 1933.

Rodgers went on to become the first "superstar" of country music, with his records achieving unprecedented sales figures. He recorded a total of 113 songs before his death, only a handful of them without yodels. A total of 13 (incl. "Last Blue Yodel") bear the title "Blue Yodel No. x", another 25 can be described as "blues". However, Rodgers did not only record such blues numbers. In addition to sentimental ballads such as "Daddy and Home" or "My Old Pal", both from 1928, his repertoire also included some cowboy songs. He was the first to combine this theme with yodeling.

Overall, the Bristol Sessions are seen as a turning point in the development of country music, moving away from the traditional string bands of the Appalachian tradition to a more blues-inspired style.

==== Influences ====
Jimmie Rodgers was the "father figure" at the beginning of blue yodeling as a mass phenomenon. All the great representatives of the genre refer to him. That is why there has been much speculation about Rodgers' own influences. It is true that there had been successful yodelers before him. White artists from the area that would later be called "country" had also played blues songs before him. However, it was Rodgers who succeeded in combining both elements in a unique way: "He was the first singer clearly to establish the yodel as an echo and comment on the blues."

It is generally assumed that he came into contact with African Americans and their music in the course of his work on the railroad or was influenced by it during his childhood in Mississippi. It is reported that he was responsible for the water rations of the Gandy Dancers, predominantly black railroad workers who owed their name to their typical tool, the "gandy", with which they lifted the rails onto the track bed. The line "Hey, little waterboy, bring that water round" from "Muleskinner Blues (Blue Yodel No. 8)" can be understood as a tribute to this time. Because the Gandy Dancers often had to work in syncopation, they developed typical four-bar chants, which themselves were influenced by African American traditions. From these laborers, Rodgers is said to have learned their songs and their typical slang, and they are also said to have taught him how to play the banjo

In addition, he must have repeatedly met wandering musicians on his railroad journeys, from whom he learned new songs in exchange for a ride. In this context, reference is made in the literature to "The Davis Limited" (1931), one of Jimmie Davis' songs, in which he describes such an incident. Songs, in which he describes one such incident. After leaving the railroad, Rodgers is also said to have learned to play guitar and blues from black musicians on Meridian's Tenth Street. In summary, it can be said that Jimmie Rodgers combined the blues songs of the black railroad workers, the Swiss yodels and the syncopation of the "pop" music of the 1920s in his style.

On the other hand, based on statements made by his wife Carrie, it is likely that he was also strongly influenced by vaudeville, which he is said to have been obsessed with. In particular, black falsetto, the breaking of the voice while singing used by colored artists, obviously influenced his style.

Some have also theorized that Rodgers learned his style from Emmett Miller. However, there is no documentary evidence for this. Miller's biographer Nick Tosches expressly leaves the question open. Miller's supposed partner at the time, Turk McBee, claimed that Miller and Rodgers had met in 1925 in Asheville (North Carolina) in 1925. However, this has since been refuted, and there are even doubts as to whether McBee really worked with Miller. Even a meeting in June 1927, when the Jimmie Rodgers Entertainers performed for some time at WWNC in Asheville and Miller gave guest performances there at the same time, cannot be proven with certainty.

However, it is undisputed that long before Rodgers' first recordings, both had already toured the country extensively with various shows, where they were exposed to a variety of different influences. It even seems possible that both were influenced by the African-American singer and vaudeville star Bert Williams, whom they must have known based on their backgrounds. Williams, along with his partner George Walker, had already recorded in a similar style around the turn of the century, also making yodel-like sounds. It remains open whether Rodgers and Miller may have actually met in person and whether one of them was influenced by the other. Apart from that, Miller does use some stylistic devices in his recordings that can be found in Rodgers and others, but it is difficult to discern independent yodels in them, as they became characteristic of blue yodeling. In contrast to Rodgers, Miller's specialty was breaking the voice while singing, not yodeling between verses.

=== The triumph of blue yodeling ===
The success of Rodgers' first hit triggered an unprecedented yodeling boom. This was not least due to the fact that the simple yodels could easily be imitated by a reasonably talented singer. The African-American musician Herb Quinn, who had lived near Rodgers in Mississippi in the 1920s, coined the phrase that anyone who could play the guitar suddenly began to yodel like Jimmie Rodgers. To exaggerate, yodeling became virtually synonymous with country music in the 1930s.

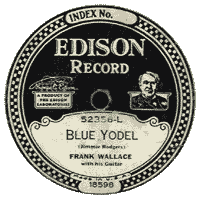
Frankie Marvins "Blue Yodel" (1928)

For financial reasons, the various record companies also tried to establish their own singers with "yodeling blues" titles on the market as quickly as possible or to get their artists to yodel. For example, Ralph Peer encouraged Sara Carter to yodel on some of the Carter Family recordings, and the Carters recorded several duets with Rodgers. Peer also arranged a joint recording of "Blue Yodel No. 9" with Louis Armstrong on trumpet and his wife Lilian on piano in 1930.

Many of the early Rodgers impersonators have remained little more than a footnote in the history of country music, such as the then 17-year-old messenger boy Bill Bruner, who filled in for the ailing Jimmie Rodgers in February 1929 and thereafter toured with tent shows as "The Singing Messenger Boy". Similarly, Rodgers' cousin Jesse Rogers met with little success as a yodeler. Others were more fortunate.

One of them was Gene Autry's long-time friend and later co-star Frankie Marvin, who had only recently switched to show business on the advice of his brother Johnny Marvin. He actually wanted to perform on his ukulele for the record label Crown, but was asked by those responsible whether he could also yodel. Yodeling was his middle name, he replied. After a short test, he recorded his version of "T for Texas" in June 1928 under the pseudonym Frankie Wallace and his Guitar for a total of four different record labels: Crown, Brunswick, Columbia, and Edison.

==== Gene Autry ====
The Marvin brothers convinced the young Gene Autry to try this new style as well. Autry had previously tried unsuccessfully to gain a foothold as a crooner during an extended stay in New York City Victor Talking Machine Company Gene Austin and Al Jolson songs. Having never yodeled before, he began practicing. He first returned to Tulsa, Oklahoma, where he appeared on radio station TVOO as "The Original Oklahoma Yodeling Cowboy." After building a good reputation and a broad fan base, he returned to New York and recorded for Columbia Rodgers' "Blue Yodel No. 5" in October 1929.

Autry's first single was released just a few days before the great stock market crash. However, it had the advantage of being released by Columbia's budget labels Velvet Tone, Diva and Harmony, so for the price of one Rodgers record (Victor), his fans could buy three of Autry's, so-called "dime store platters". Of all the Rodgers imitators, Autry was also the one who was able to get closest to his idol; on some recordings he is barely distinguishable from Rodgers.

While Autry initially mainly imitated Rodgers and also covered pieces by other performers, he began to compose his own songs and find his own style at the end of 1930. This showed that he could not only imitate Rodgers' yodeling, but also had a distinct feel for the blues. "Yodeling Hobo", "Bear Cat Papa Blue" or "Jail-House Blues" are just a few of his own compositions, which increasingly pushed back the Rodgers titles.

Autry's first title that he did not record in this typical blues style brought him his big breakthrough: the sentimental That Silver Haired Daddy of Mine, which he recorded in October 1931 together with Jimmy Long, his longtime companion from his telegraphist days and uncle of his wife. Although he continued to record blues numbers, from 1933 onwards he concentrated almost exclusively on cowboy tunes, with which he eventually became the most popular and commercially successful Singing Cowboy alongside Roy Rogers. He still occasionally yodeled there, but no longer in the original style.

During this time, Autry also seems to have made a complete break with his past as a minstrel and blues artist, especially with the disreputable lyrics of some of his recordings. In his autobiography Back in the Saddle Again (1997), he does not mention Jimmie Rodgers once; he responded evasively to corresponding questions from journalists throughout his life and later even relativized Rodgers' influence on his early career.

==== Cliff Carlisle ====
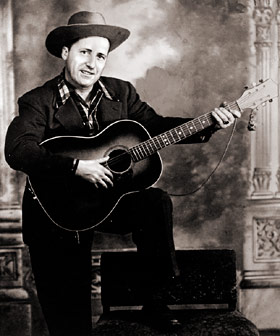
Cliff Carlisle (ca. 1934)

Born in 1904 in Kentucky, Cliff Carlisle had already been enthusiastic about Hawaiian music, which was very popular in the southern states of the USA at the time, during his childhood. He therefore began to play steel guitar and later went down in history as one of its great pioneers. In the 1920s, he appeared with his partner Wilbur Ball in vaudeville and tent shows, performing in the South as hillbillies and in the North as Hawaiians. In 1930, they had a permanent radio show on WHAS in Louisville. During this time, Jimmie Rodgers had his first successes and Carlisle realized that he too was a talented yodeler. He applied to Gennett Records, who enthusiastically seized the opportunity to place his own yodel on the market. Together with Ball, Carlisle recorded numerous cover versions of Rodgers tunes, one of the first being "Memphis Yodel", which on the one hand is clearly stylistically based on the original, but on the other hand also stands out from it due to the Hawaiian influence and Carlisle's own singing style. In 1931, Carlisle and Ball even made two joint recordings with Rodgers, including "When the Cactus is in Bloom".

Over time, Carlisle found his own style. As "The Yodeling Hobo", he recorded a mix of traditional ballads and hobo numbers, but also numerous titles that dealt with controversial topics that were to shape country music for a long time. His "Seven Years with the Wrong Woman" from 1932, for example, was one of the first country songs to deal with the subject of divorce, while "Pay Day Fight" from 1937 describes a married couple's physical dispute over money on payday. In retrospect, he described his music as "a cross between hillbilly and blues – even Hawaiian music has sort of blues to it."

==== Jimmie Davis ====
Another artist who was inspired by Rodgers at the beginning of his career was the later two-time governor of Louisiana Jimmie Davis. In the late 1920s, he worked as a teacher at Dodd College in Shreveport. As a sideline, he recorded sentimental pop songs for Shreveport radio station KWKH and its record label, but also sang in the blue yodel style. During this time, he recorded several Rodgers tunes, alongside original compositions in the blues style, backed by blues guitarists Oscar Woods and Ed Schaffer. Some of these titles contained unusually explicit sexual references for the time, which led to songs such as "Bed Bug Blues" or "Red Nightgown Blues" being used against him in the election campaign, but without success. However, he had his greatest successes as an interpreter of gospel songs and pop ballads such as "Nobody's Darlin' But Mine" (1934) and "You Are My Sunshine" (1940).

==== Elton Britt ====
Also inspired by Jimmie Rodgers was Elton Britt (1913–1972), but he was to surpass his role model by far when it came to yodeling technique. Having grown up in a musical family, he emulated Rodgers as a teenager. In his enthusiasm, he is said to have joined Rodgers at one of his appearances on the Round-Up Show of Buffalo Bill's star Pawnee Bill in Oklahoma, where Rodgers recommended that he go to California. When the two later met again in Hollywood, Rodgers is said to have recommended that Ralph Peer sign Britt, but this did not materialize.

After various stops, Britt had his first major success as a solo artist in June 1934 with "Chime Bells", accompanied on piano by Bob Miller, who had composed the song. "Chime Bells" is exemplary for Britt's yodeling style and at the same time for a certain break with the legacy of his role model Rodgers. Thematizing mountain lakes and the ringing of bells and stylistically kept in 6/8 time, it has nothing to do with blues or even country, but creates a "peculiar European feeling". Mainly, however, it served as a vehicle for Britt to demonstrate his yodeling by every trick in the book, described as "pyrotechnic" and "the world's highest yodeler". Indeed, alongside Roy Rogers, Britt is regarded as the yodeller who brought the complex, fast-singing and tumbling yodels to top form: "He set the gold standard." Both Britt and Roy Rogers covered Jimmie Rodgers' "My Little Lady", which over time had become a test for advanced yodelers. In his version from 1928, Rodgers himself had limited himself to stretching out the word endings in the refrain "Hady-ee, my little lady-ee". At the same time, however, Britt managed not to let the yodeling "hang in the air" or conflict with the content of the song, just like Rodgers, who had rejected the alpine style for this reason.

However, Britt had his greatest success as a singer of sentimental pop ballads after his final breakthrough in 1942 with the patriotic title "There's a Star-Spangled Banner Waving Somewhere".

=== The next generation ===
While the aforementioned artists such as Autry, Carlisle and Davis, referred to by Bill C. Malone as the three greatest 'imitators' of Jimmie Rodgers , had been active during Rodgers' lifetime and in some cases in personal contact with him, Rodgers' legacy continued to produce some of country music's biggest stars after his death in 1933.

==== Ernest Tubb ====
One of them was Ernest Tubb. Growing up on a cotton farm in Texas, he learned the words and melody of "In the Jailhouse Now" from his older sister in the summer of 1928 at the age of 14. However, his sister could not yodel. It was not until a year later that he was able to hear recordings of Jimmie Rodgers for the first time and then began collecting his records and yodeling himself.

In late 1933, Tubb had moved to San Antonio with his friends Jim and Joe Castleman in search of work. The Castlemans formed the trio The Castleman Brothers with their acquaintance Merwyn Buffington, later joined by their brother Barney. Their repertoire consisted mainly of Western-oriented material, but they also played songs in the Rodgers style in keeping with the spirit of the times. They eventually landed a broadcast on radio station KMAC, and it was here that Ernest Tubb made his first radio appearance as a guest vocalist. He quickly became a regular accompanist for the Castlemans, and shortly thereafter he was able to secure another broadcast for the band on competitor KONO, but this time under his own name.

Around the spring of 1936 (the exact date is disputed), Tubb contacted Rodger's widow Carrie to ask for her autograph. A long friendship developed from this encounter, and through Carrie, Tubb came into contact with her sister Elsie McWilliams, who had written songs for Jimmie Rodgers. She had written several songs about Rodgers, which Tubb was now able to use, such as "My Blue Bonnett Dream" or "Jimmie Rodger's Last Thoughts". The latter was renamed "The Last Thoughts of Jimmie Rodgers" by RCA, in reference to "The Passing of Jimmie Rodgers". In the end, Tubb got a recording contract with RCA through Carrie's mediation, but his first recording was not as a singer but as a guitarist on Carrie's recording of "We Miss Him When the Evening Shadows Fall". He himself was not mentioned by name, unlike Rodgers' guitar, on which he played.

A tonsil operation ended Tubb's career as a yodeller in 1939. However, as he could not imagine singing Jimmie Rodgers songs without yodeling, he increasingly began to develop his own style and write his own songs, with which he eventually went down in history as an icon of honky-tonk.

==== Hank Snow ====
The Canadian Hank Snow was regularly abused by his stepfather as a teenager. To escape him, Snow signed on to a fishing trawler off the coast of Nova Scotia. There he entertained the crew with singing performances, accompanied on the harmonica. His mother, who had encouraged him to sing in the church choir as a child, gave him a Victrola, a portable phonograph to wind up, and some records by Vernon Dalhart, in which he was particularly fascinated by the guitar playing. Around 1930 he was given some records by Jimmie Rodgers, whom he enthusiastically imitated from then on.

With this repertoire behind him, he applied to the radio station CHNS in Halifax in 1933. Although he was given his own program there as "The Yodeling Ranger", he still had to keep his head above water with various side jobs at first. Over time, he was able to build up a growing fan base in north-eastern Canada and in October 1936 he made his first recordings for the Canadian RCA subsidiary Bluebird, including the self-composed "Lonesome Blue Yodel". In 1944, he switched to the CKCW station in New Brunswick, where he now appeared as "The Singing Ranger", as he had largely given up yodeling. His records were not released in the US until 1949. Only appearances at the Grand Ole Opry and his hit "I'm Moving On" brought him his breakthrough there.

=== Further development ===
By the end of the 1930s, the public's interest in hillbilly music had already waned. However, yodeling did not disappear completely from public perception, but was also adopted by representatives of other styles, often in the form of cover versions of Rodgers' songs. Examples include "Blue Yodel No. 1" by Bob Wills with yodels by Tommy Duncan or the recordings of "Mule Skinner Blues" by Bill Monroe. In 1950, Monroe recorded the faster-paced "New Mule Skinner Blues", a George Vaughn Horton (the brother of Ralph Peer's former partner and CMA chairman Roy Horton) under the pseudonym George Vaughan, which was adjusted to remove the sexual innuendo and references to the consumption of alcohol. In his live performances, however, Monroe usually used the original version.

In 1946, Bill Haley started his career as "The Ramblin' Yodeler." Yodeling was taken to new heights by Slim Whitman, who was also successful with it in the pop charts. And Jerry Lee Lewis has also yodeled regularly since his days at Sun Records; his best recordings in this regard include "Lovesick Blues" (1958) and "Waiting for a Train" (1962).

The last interpreter of the "White Country Blues" is Hank Williams, who did not yodel explicitly, but used the breaking of the voice, for example in one of his most famous recordings, "Lovesick Blues" (1949). His son Hank Williams Jr. is certain that Hank Sr. learned "Lovesick Blues" from Emmett Miller. Although Williams bought the rights to the modified song from Rex Griffin, he had previously heard Miller's version, although it is unclear whether this was in person or on a record. His drawn-out you-ooo on "I'd Still Want You" is also clearly reminiscent of Miller. Another example of Williams' excursions into this style is "Long Gone Lonesome Blues". However, yodeling was also repeatedly taken up by well-known country stars, often as a tribute to Jimmie Rodgers. These include Lefty Frizzell and Dolly Parton, who had her first top 10 hit with "Mule Skinner Blues" in 1970.

=== Present ===
In modern country music, yodeling practically no longer plays a role. Those responsible attach great importance to progressiveness and avoid any echoes of their former 'hillbilly image'. However, there are exceptions. In 1998, the band the Wilkinsons reached number 45 in the US country chart with "The Yodelin' Blues". Blue yodeling came to the attention of a wider public again in 2000, when a remake of Jimmie Rodgers' "In the Jailhouse Now" was released on the soundtrack to the film O Brother, Where Art Thou? In 2006, child star Taylor Ware caused a sensation when she made it into the top 5 of the America's Got Talent show with her jodelling songs. Occasionally, voice breaking is still used as an effect, for example in LeAnn Rimes's first hit "Blue" (1996) or Steve Holy's "Blue Moon" (2000). Dwight Yoakam also tends to break his voice, i.e. a strong but artful croak that always carries the hint of a sad yodel. The situation is different in the field of traditional and alternative country music. Artists such as Don Walser, Ed Burleson or Jason Eklund, who died in 2006, also used yodeling to clearly oppose the pop development in Nashville-style country music. Blue yodeling thus became an expression of clear protest against commercial structures as early as the mid-1990s: yodeling is practically unthinkable in commercial, radio-oriented new country. Wylie Gustafson from the group Wylie & the Wild West even wrote a textbook: How to Yodel: Lessons to Tickle Your Tonsils. Small yodeling courses are regularly held at the band's gigs, where Wylie teaches the audience the basics and encourages them to yodel.

There is also a constant interest in the old recordings, which is reflected in scientific publications and a large number of relevant samplers, some of which use the term "Country Yodel".

==== Western music ====
Yodelling is still very widespread in the field of Western music to this day, although the style there differs greatly from blue yodelling. Although many important representatives of the genre cite Jimmie Rodgers as a role model, their yodeling interludes are far more sophisticated and extravagant. They also lack the blues elements.

The Canadian singer Wilf Carter, better known in the US as "Montana Slim", acted as a kind of interface between these two worlds. Around 1915, as a child on a cattle drive, he saw a Swiss artist called "The Yodeling Fool" in a show and was bitten by the yodeling bug. During his long career, he recorded mainly cowboy material alongside hillbilly and hobo songs and developed his own yodeling style, known as "three-in-one" or "echo yodeling".

==== Australia ====
In addition, yodeling was and is popular in Australian country music. According to one study, yodelling was used in two-thirds of the songs representative of the period between 1936 and 1960, and yodelling competitions were still widespread in pubs in 1994. Like many others, Australia's Slim Dusty cultivated the Jimmie Rodgers style in his early career after producer Arch Kerr told him in the early 1940s that he could not sell country music without yodeling. Even before Dusty, Tex Morton had enjoyed greater success in the 1930s as "The Yodelling Boundary Rider". He was also strongly influenced by Rodgers, but also by Wilf Carter and Goebel Reeves. He adapted American themes to Australian conditions, the "Hobo" became the "Bagman", the "Cowboy" became the "Boundary Rider".

== Characteristics ==
Immediately after the release of "T for Texas", it was not clear how this new style should be categorized. Victor had advertised it as a "popular song for comedian with guitar" and Rodgers' style as "grotesque". However, the reference to African-American traditions was unmistakable; one critic described him as a "white man gone black". Indeed, Rodgers must have had a special feel for this style, which, according to Cliff Carlisle, was also reflected in his whole manner: "Jimmie, he reminded me more of a colored person, or a negro ... than anybody I ever saw, in a way." Thus, the lyrical I in "Mule Skinner Blues", whose first sentences are based on a song by blues musician Tom Dickson, is also addressed as "shine", a derogatory term for black people derived from "shoe shine".

Conversely, Rodgers' music was also appreciated and used as inspiration by African Americans, who, according to an assessment expressed in the literature, may have made him at least in part an "honorary negro". This association went so far that some historians, to whom Rodgers was unknown, classified his songs as traditional folk songs and made the following statement in relation to "Blue Yodel No. 5": "As we have it here it is clearly a Negro blues song."

In an essay published in 1957, the music journalist John Greenway identified a situational and a prosodic pattern, i.e. the relationship between word and sound, as identifying features of blue yodeling. The "rounder" often appears, boasting about his abilities as a lover, but at the same time is deeply insecure and constantly fears the "creeper" who wants to steal his partner. He reacts to this with threats or violence and/or the assurance that he can have any other woman anyway. In formal terms, this is achieved through the use of "negro maverick stanzas", which - often in an ambiguous way - thematize violence and promiscuity. In "Blue Yodel No. 3", for example, mistrust is followed by a threat: "Won't you tell me, mama, where you stayed last night, 'cause your hair's all tangled and your clothes don't fit you right (...) The day you quit me, woman, that's the day that you die."

The individual verses are linked by the characteristic 'yodel refrains'. Although the treatment of the themes mentioned contributed to the great emotionality of the music, it was the sometimes tortured yodel refrains that created an atmosphere of loneliness and despair.

Compared to the Alpine models, the blue yodels were simpler in structure and could be imitated without much effort. Assumptions that this could be due to Rodgers' inability to play more elaborate yodels turned out to be wrong: Rodgers preferred the simpler yodels, based on the melody and content of the pieces, to their counterparts, which were of a higher artistic quality but often detached. In this way, he created a unity of content and performance. In a letter to Gene Autry in the spring of 1930, he complained that an organizer wanted to replace him with a "friek (sic!) yodeler" after he had to cancel due to illness. What was meant was a Swiss yodeler. With regard to the peculiarity of blue yodeling, Cliff Carlisle stated that the difference to a Swiss yodeler, for example, was that it was produced with the tongue, but the blue yodel was "down in here", by which he meant both the larynx and the heart, a sound "from the belly", so to speak.

For the many young men who emulated Rodgers, blue yodeling is said to have been a means of releasing pent-up sexual desire and aggression, a procedure that is said to have a cathartic effect. ("a non-verbal statement of youthful bravado, a catharsis, Whitman's 'barbaric yawp'"). (The latter is an allusion to Walt Whitman's poem Song of Myself, where the last stanza states: "I too am not a bit tamed, I too am untranslatable/I sound my barbaric yawps over the roofs of the world."

They may also have seen this as an affirmation of their masculinity after many men must have felt socially and economically "emasculated" during the economic crisis.

Stylistically, Rodgers drew on the rich musical tradition of blues and folk music. He often used the classic 12-bar blues scheme ("12 bar blues"), with the first line of each verse being repeated twice. He also used common phrases, so-called floating lyrics or maverick stanzas (sometimes also maverick phrases). The term 'maverick' originally referred to a masterless calf without branding, which could be incorporated by the finder into his herd. Accordingly, maverick stanzas are traditional lines or fragments of text that have been in circulation in a certain environment for a long time and are incorporated into their own texts with more or less major changes. Blues producer Robert Palmer later described it as a blues custom, in the context of the plagiarism allegations against Led Zeppelin, for a singer to "borrow" verses from oral tradition or from other people's recordings, adapt them and then use them as his composition. An example of this is the line "I can get more women than a passenger train can haul" from "T for Texas". It appeared as early as 1924 in Bessie Smiths' "Ticket, Agent, Ease Your Window Down", although she sang "men" instead of "women". In 1925 it was used by Papa Charlie Jackson in "The Faking Blues" and in 1936 by Oscar "Buddy" Woods in "Don't Sell It (Don't Give It Away)". In the opposite direction, fragments from Rodgers' songs also appeared in compositions by black blues musicians, for example Peg Leg Howell used parts from "Waiting for a Train" and "Blue Yodel No. 4" (1928) in his title "Broke and Hungry Blues", released six months later.

The thematization of sexuality and violence was already particularly striking for contemporaries. The same critic who had described Rodgers as a "white man gone black" labeled "T for Texas" with the attribute "bloodthirsty", as Rodgers sings about how he shoots his unfaithful Thelma with a pistol and her lover with a shotgun: "I'm gonna shoot poor Thelma, just to see her jump and fall (...) I'm gonna shoot that rounder, that stole away my gal." This description was also a reference to the blues, because during the 1920s, African-American magazines specifically advertised jazzy blues numbers as "bloodthirsty", which dealt with the killing of unfaithful husbands. The review was published in the literary magazine The Bookmann, which was aimed at educated whites, and was intended to suggest the crossing of the boundary between genres, across all racial boundaries.

However, sexual topics in particular were covered in detail. In this context, the consistent designation of women as "Mama" and men as "Daddy" or "Papa" is striking. Although the lyrics did not reach the explicit clarity of today, they hid behind increasingly daring ambiguities. Rodgers had already sung metaphorically in "Pistol Packing Papa" (1930): "If you don't wanna smell my smoke, don't monkey with my gun". Cliff Carlisle went much further. In keeping with a common practice at the time, "dirty" themes were often alluded to with allusions from the animal kingdom, such as in "Shanghai Rooster Yodel" (1931) or "Tom Cat Blues" (1932). Hen and rooster were particularly popular, and when "Tom Cat Blues" (1932) is about "cock" and "pussy", it is left to the listener's imagination whether they are really animals. In "That Nasty Swing" from 1934, the gramophone serves as a reference point: "Place the needle in that hole and do that nasty swing". A similarly suggestive title is "Sugar Cane Mama" (1934). Gene Autry also recorded several such titles in his early years, such as "Wild Cat Mama", "She's a Low-Down Mama" or "Do Right Daddy Blues" (1931), which reads "You can feel of my legs, you can feel of my thighs, but if you feel my legs you got to ride me high". Unlike others, however, Autry broke completely with these "smut songs" shortly afterwards.

Another characteristic of the Blue Yodels are the numerous references to the railroad. On the one hand, these stem from Rodgers' biography, on the other hand they are an expression of a longing for vastness and independence and also correspond to the experiences that many Americans had during this time as itinerant job seekers. They also fit into the pattern of the bum songs that were popular at the time and made the hobo their hero, such as "H.O.B.O. Calling" by Goebel Reeves or "I Don't Work for a Living" by Pete Wiggins.

Over time, the range of topics covered increased and reached as far as novelty songs such as "Married Man Blues" (1937) by Ernest Tubb or "Yodeling Mule" (1939) by the Three Tobacco Tags. Particularly unusual is Jimmie Rodgers' duet with Sara Carter "The Wonderful City" (1931), in which the Heavenly Jerusalem is sung about. It is the only religious song that Rodgers recorded.

== Literature ==
- Robert Coltman: Roots of the Country Yodel: Notes toward a Life History. In: Nolan Porterfield (Hrsg.): Exploring Roots Music, Twenty Years of the JEMF Quarterly. The Scarecrow Press, 2003, ISBN 978-0-8108-4893-1, S. 135–156.
- Charles Wolfe: A Lighter Shade of Blue: White Country Blues. In: Steven Carl Tracy (Hrsg.): Write Me a Few of Your Lines: A Blues Reader. University of Massachusetts Press, 1999, ISBN 978-1-55849-206-6, S. 514–530, hier: S. 524 f.
- Graeme Smith: Yodeling. In: John Shepherd (Hrsg.) et al.: Continuum Encyclopedia of Popular Music of the World. Volume 2: Production and Performance. Continuum International Publishing Group, 2003, ISBN 978-0-8264-6322-7, S. 176 f.
- Yodeling Cowboys and such. In: Nick Tosches: Country: The Twisted Roots of Rock'n'Roll. Da Capo Press, 1996, ISBN 978-0-306-80713-8, S. 109–117; gibt auch einen guten Überblick
