= The Allen Brothers =

The Allen Brothers may refer to the following musical groups:

- The Allen Brothers (American duo) 1930s country music duo, Austin and Lee Allen
- The Allen Brothers (Australia) 1960s band of Peter Allen and Chris Bell

== See also ==
- Allen Brothers, a purveyor of prime steaks headquartered in Chicago, IL
