= Heinrich Albert (composer) =

German composer and poet

Heinrich Albert (also Heinrich Alberti) (28 June 1604 – 6 October 1651) was a German composer and poet of the 17th century. He was a member of the Königsberg Poetic Society (Königsberger Dichterkreis). As a song composer, he was strongly influenced by Heinrich Schütz.

== Biography ==
Albert was born in Lobenstein, Principality of Reuss in Thuringia. He attended grammar school in Gera from 1619 to 1621 and studied music in 1622 with his cousin Heinrich Schütz in Dresden. Schütz introduced him to the basics of composition. Complying with his parents wishes, Albert enrolled in law at the University of Leipzig in 1623. There, he also continued his studies in music, probably with Johann Hermann Schein, a friend of Schütz, who worked as Thomaskantor in Leipzig.

In 1626, Albert tried to dodge the Thirty Years' War, going to Königsberg. In the following year, he traveled from Königsberg to Warsaw as a member of a Dutch parley delegation, but was taken captive by Swedish troops. He was released in 1628 and returned to Königsberg where he took up studies in defensive fortification. By 1630 he had returned to being a musician in Königsberg, and was appointed organist of the cathedral, where he served from 1 April 1631, until his premature death at the age of 47. His funeral was organized by the university, and the Latin obituary has so far been the principal source of information about his biography.

Albert was a member of the Königsberg Poetic Society together with Simon Dach, Robert Roberthin, Georg Mylius, Martin Opitz, et al. The poets would convene at the Kürbishütte, an arbor in Albert's garden, where the Linde dyke flows into the river Pregel. The council of Kneiphof had given the garden as a present to the organist in 1630. In his garden, Albert grew pumpkins and gourds, and the friends would carve their bucolic noms de plume into the gourds. It was here that Martin Opitz visited his friend Simon Dach in 1638. The garden and the arbor, however, fell prey to then urban management that provided for housing in the Weidendamm area.

A memorial stone to Albert has been erected in a copse in Bad Lobenstein.

== Works ==
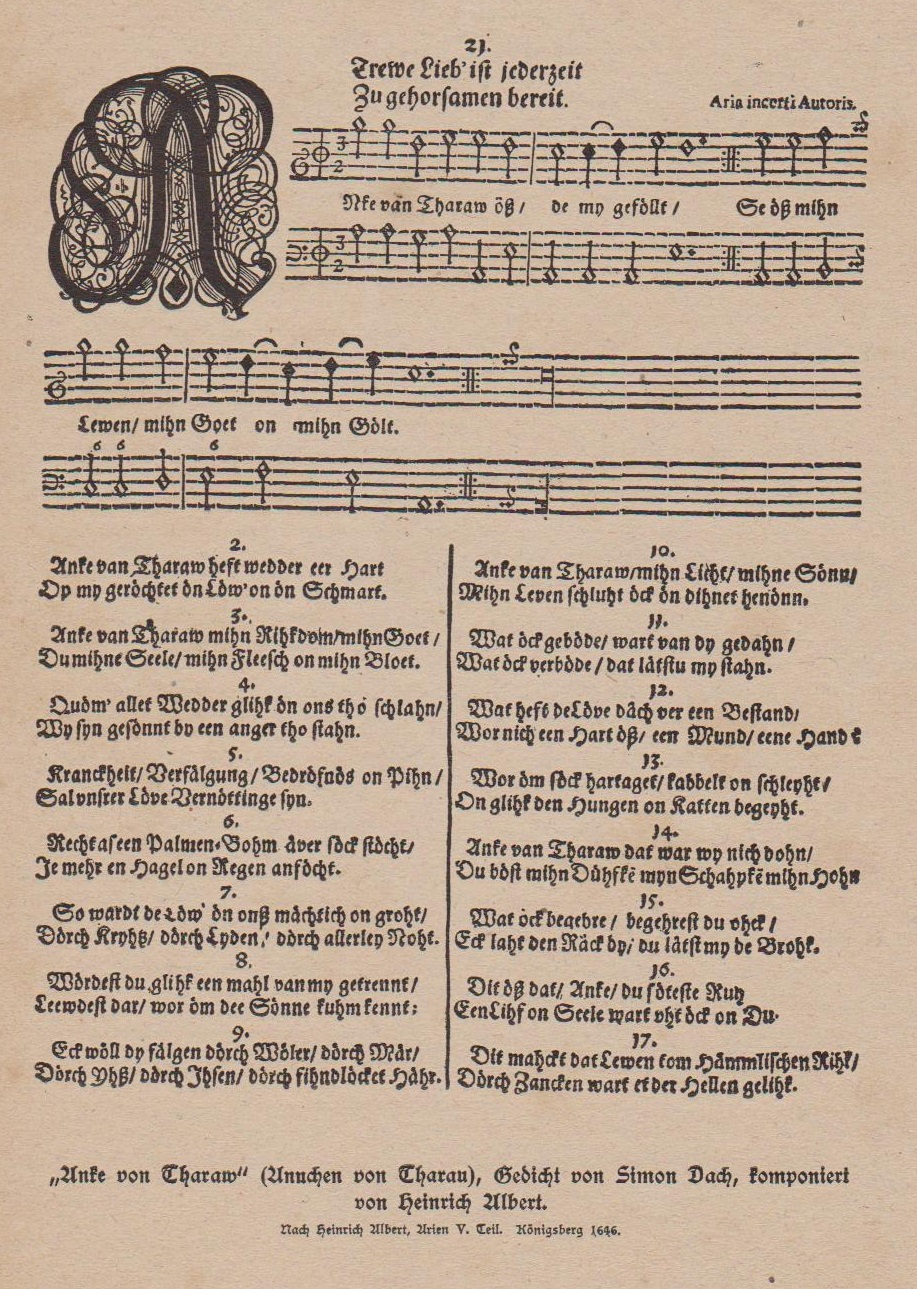
Anke van Tharaw, with music by Heinrich Albert

In Königsberg, Albert composed for both the civic and academic communities. He furnished quite a few academic occasions with music, e.g., the centenary of the University of Königsberg in 1644. Numerous occasional compositions have survived that he penned for weddings and funerals, as well as homages to distinguished persons, and songs about nature, wine, and love. His most famous song probably is Ännchen von Tharau with lyrics by Dach. Today the song is usually sung, though, to a melody by Friedrich Silcher. Some of his sacred songs are still part of German Protestant hymnals, e.g., Gott des Himmels und der Erden and Ich bin ja, Herr, in deiner Macht.

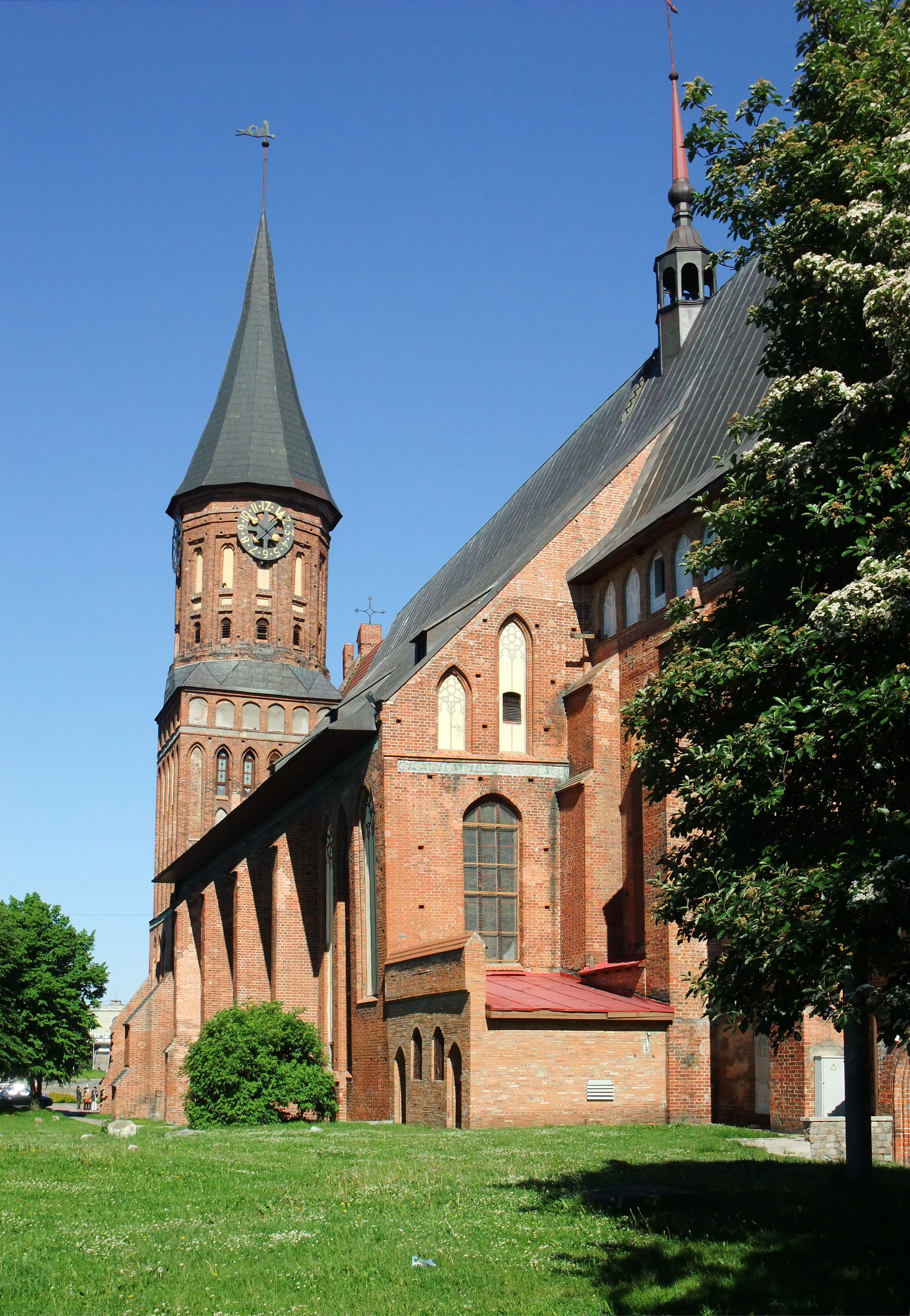
Königsberg Cathedral

In 1643 Albert renewed contact with Schütz. He also studied with Johann Stobäus (died 1646), Kapellmeister of cathedral and court. Stobäus was a representative of the Königsberg school of composers, which includes composers from Johannes Eccard to Johann Sebastiani (ca. 1590–1690). Polyphonic five-part-writing was the rule that Albert obeyed as well. Quite a few of Albert's five-part songs, though, actually are expanded versions of solo songs. It was by means of these thorough-bass solo songs that he became popular.

Albert set his own poetry and that of his friends to music and published them as scores in eight volumes, mainly, as from 1638, labelled Arien oder Melodeyen, totaling 170 songs. He provided these volumes with prefaces, offering detailed instructions for performance (he demanded e.g., that one should not play continuo "like hacking a cabbage". Besides these eight volumes, he published numerous occasional prints, which have so far not been completely registered in terms of bibliography.

Endowed with a strong sense of his copyright, he tried to protect his compositions against pirated prints by means of privileges which he gained from the duke of Prussia and from the Polish king. The edition of Poetisch-musikalische Lustwäldlein of 1648 is one such pirated print of parts 1 to 6 of his Arien, although in a different order and with many errors.

His tunes show French influence, subtly taking account of stresses and lengths of syllables and words, as well as Italian influence, expressing affects in terms of music, e.g., passion by means of melisma and coloratura. Albert also absorbed many typical Italian, German, and especially Polish dance rhythms.

A number of his songs go beyond simple forms: some are structured like cantatas, with instrumental introduction, lyrics, through-composed for solo voice, and with a short coda for choir or instruments.
