= Julie Hausmann =

Baltic German poet

Julie Katharina Hausmann
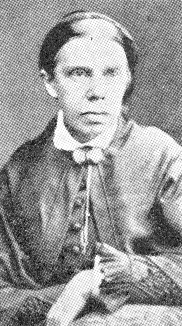
- Born: Julie Katharina Hausmann; 18 March 1826; Riga, Latvia
- Died: 15 August 1901 (aged 75); Võsu, Estonia
- Known for: Poet
- Notable work: So nimm denn meine Hände

Julie Katharina Hausmann (Note: Her name is often stated erroneously as Julie von Hausmann. However, the nobiliary particle "von" was granted personally to her father in 1856 and was not hereditary. See: Röhrig, Karl (1925). "Die ursprüngliche Textgestalt von 'So nimm denn meine Hände'". Monatsschrift für Gottesdienst und kirchliche Kunst. 30 (4/5): 115–117.) (19 March [O.S. 7 March] 1826 – 15 August [O.S. 2 August] 1901) was a Baltic German poet, known for the hymn "So nimm denn meine Hände" ("Lord, Take My Hand and Lead Me"), with a melody by Friedrich Silcher.

== Life and work ==
Born in Riga, Latvia the daughter of a teacher, Hausmann worked for a while as a governess. Due to her ill health, she lived with and cared for her father, who had gone blind. After his death in 1864, she lived with her sisters in Germany, Southern France, and St. Petersburg, Russia.

A legend holds that Hausmann wrote her most famous poem "So nimm denn meine Hände" after journeying to see her fiancé at a mission in Africa and, on arriving, finding that he had just died. Various explorations of her biography have yet to confirm or deny the rumor. She never married. Her poetry was published by others, including Gustav Knak without mentioning her name, at her request.

She died during a summer vacation in Võsu, Estonia. She is buried at the cemetery of Illumae chapel.

== Works ==
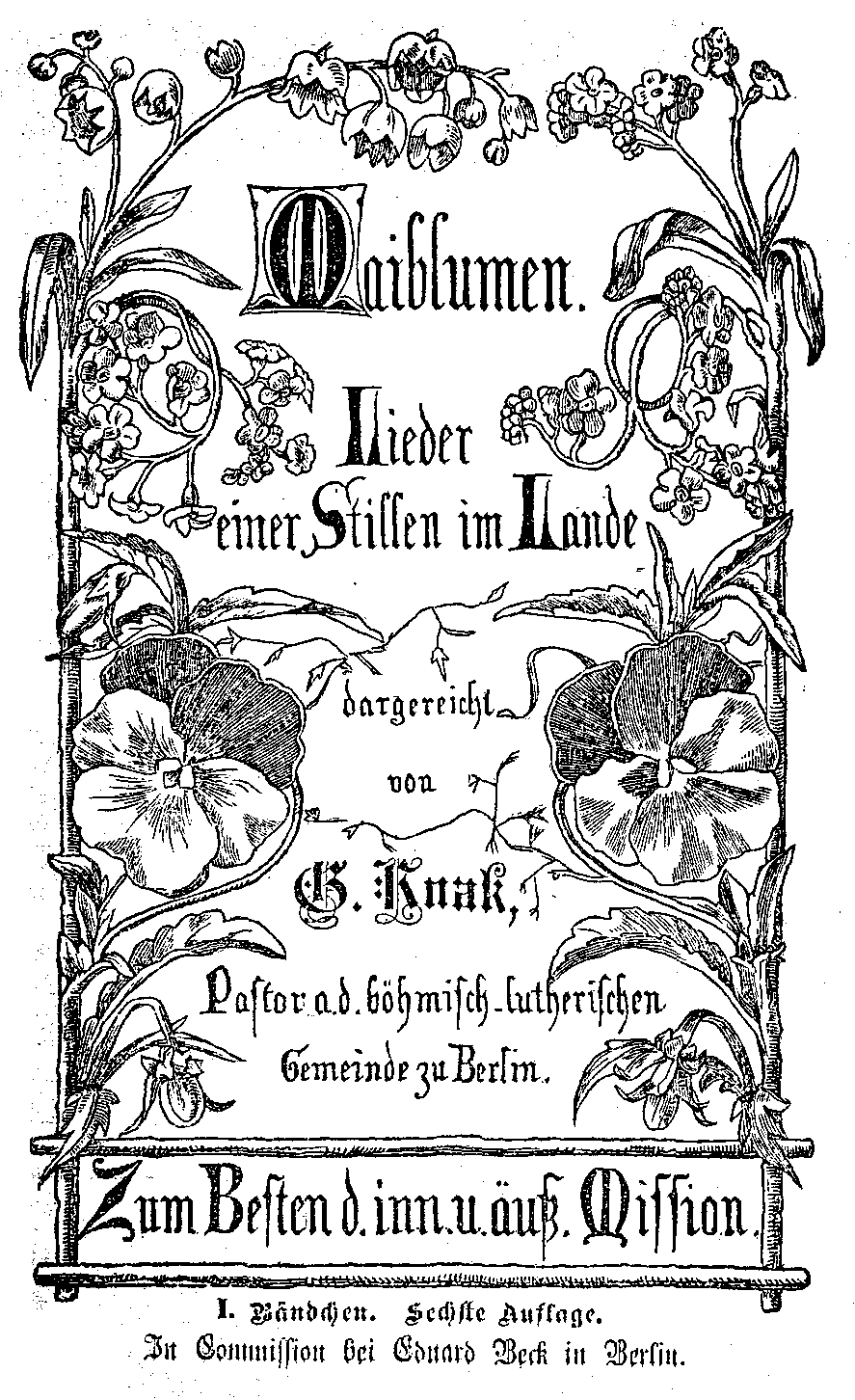
Hausmann Maiblumen

- Maiblumen. Lieder einer Stillen im Lande. (May flowers) 2 volumes, 1862 (6th edition around 1880: Front cover Vol. 1)
- Bilder aus dem Leben der Nacht im Lichte des Evangeliums. 1868
- Hausbrot. Schlichte Morgen- und Abend-Andachten. 1899
- Blumen aus Gottes Garten. Lieder und Gedichte. 1902 (posthumous collection)
