= 1931 in country music =

This is a list of notable events in country music that took place in the year 1931.

== Events ==
Jimmie Rodgers, "the Father of Country Music", continued to dominate Hillbilly (Country) music in 1931, though the Great Depression was causing record sales and royalties to spiral downward at a frightening rate (by 1934, Columbia Records would be bankrupt). Only the Carter Family would come close.

== Top Hillbilly (Country) Recordings 1931 ==
Thanks to the Discography of American Historical Recordings website, the year 1931 is perhaps the most accurate top "Hillbilly" records list of all. Eighteen of the songs were ranked from sales figures kept by Victor Records (as "Number sold," under "Other information") deriving from markings on the backs of blue history cards and are included in DAHR, when known, as part of their effort to make available significant data found in original Victor documents. As John Bolig points out in the introduction to his Victor black label discography (1800-1900 series, Denver: Mainspring Press, 2008), these numbers are not to be considered authoritative. It is likely that they represent a sales audit from a specific time, and they do not appear to have been updated regularly. In addition, it is possible that the sales figures may represent cumulative sales from various issues (catalog numbers) of the masters represented on the blue history cards, and not exclusively from one such release.

Billboard surveys did not approach reasonable accuracy until the late 1940s, due to the small sample size, confusion over best-selling, jukebox, and airplay charts, and any number of startup issues. At this point in history, Victor made up a large percentage of Hillbilly releases because of economic circumstances. They appear to have kept the best records by far of any of the labels.

Numerical rankings are approximate, as there were no Billboard charts in 1931; the numbers are only used for a frame of reference.

Rank	Artist	Title	Label	Recorded	Released	Chart Positions
1	Jimmie Rodgers	"Blue Yodel No. 8 (Mule Skinner Blues)"	Victor 23503	July 11, 1930	January 6, 1931	US Hillbilly 1931 No. 1
2	Jimmie Rodgers	"T.B. Blues"	Victor 23535	January 31, 1931	April 24, 1931	US Hillbilly 1931 No. 2, 47,355 sales
3	Bud Billings (Frank Luther) and Carson Robison	"When Your Hair Has Turned To Silver"	Victor 22588	November 26, 1931	January 23, 1931	US BB 1931 No. 48, US No. 4 for 1 week, 12 total weeks, US Hillbilly 1931 No. 3, 38,805 sales
4	Jimmie Rodgers	"Jimmie the Kid"	Victor 23549	January 31, 1931	June 5, 1931	US Hillbilly 1931 No. 4, 36,450 sales
5	Jimmie Rodgers	"Travellin’ Blues"	Victor 23564	January 31, 1931	July 17, 1931	US Hillbilly 1931 No. 5, 31,734 sales
6	Jimmie Rodgers	"Nobody Knows But Me"	Victor 23518	November 25, 1931	March 13, 1931	US Hillbilly 1931 No. 6, 28,959 sales
7	Jimmie Rodgers	"Blue Yodel No. 9 (Standing On a Corner)"	Victor 23580	July 16, 1931	September 11, 1931	US Hillbilly 1931 No. 7, 25,071 sales, Grammy Hall of Fame in 2007
8	Jimmie Rodgers Assisted By The Carter Family	"Jimmie Rodgers Visits the Carter Family"	Victor 23574	June 11, 1931	August 14, 1931	US Hillbilly 1931 No. 8, 24,093 sales
9	Carter Family	"Little Log Hut In The Lane"	Victor 40328	May 24, 1930	December 9, 1930	US Hillbilly 1931 No. 9, 17,990 sales
10	Carter Family	"On the Rock Where Moses Stood"	Victor 23513	November 24, 1931	January 16, 1931	US Hillbilly 1931 No. 10, 16,407 sales
11	Carter Family	"Lonesome Valley"	Victor 23541	November 24, 1930	April 27, 1931	US BB 1931 No. 175, US No. 15 for 1 week, 2 total weeks, US Hillbilly 1931 No. 11, 15,107 sales
12	Carter Family	"Where Shall I Be"	Victor 23523	November 25, 1930	February 8, 1931	US Hillbilly 1931 No. 12, 13,275 sales
13	Allen Brothers	"No Low Down Hanging 'Round"	Victor 23536	November 22, 1930	May 16, 1931	US Hillbilly 1931 No. 13, 11,769 sales
14	Jimmie Rodgers with Lani McIntire's Hawaiians	"Moonlight And Skies"	Victor 23574	June 30, 1931	August 14, 1931	US Hillbilly 1931 No. 13, 24,093 sales
15	Fleming and Townsend	Little Home Upon the Hill	Victor V-40321	June 6, 1930	November 21, 1930	US Hillbilly 1931 No. 15, 10,888 sales
16	Buster Carter and Preston Young	"A Lazy Farmer Boy"	Columbia 15702	June 26, 1931	August 1931	US Hillbilly 1931 No. 16
17	Joe McCoy and Memphis Minnie	"Let's Go To Town"	Vocalion 1660	March 16, 1931	May 1931	US Hillbilly 1931 No. 17
18	Jimmie Davis	"Arabella Blues"	Victor 23517	November 29, 1930	February 18, 1931	US Hillbilly 1931 No. 18, 9,653 sales
19	Carter Family	"When I'm Gone"	Victor 23569	November 24, 1931	January 16, 1931	US Hillbilly 1931 No. 18, 9,566 sales
20	Carter Family	"There Is Someone Waiting For Me"	Victor 23554	November 24, 1931	January 16, 1931	US Hillbilly 1931 No. 19, 9,490 sales
21	Carter Family	"Fond Affection"	Victor 40328	November 24, 1931	January 16, 1931	US Hillbilly 1931 No. 20, 7,261 sales

== Births ==
- July 26 – Fred Foster, record producer and songwriter (died 2019).
- September 12 – George Jones, "The Possum," one of the genre's all-time greatest vocalists (died 2013).
- November 8 – Harold Shedd, record producer most associated with the 1980s success of Alabama.
- December 30 – Skeeter Davis, the top vocalist in country music during the 1960s, best known for the hit song "The End of the World" (died 2004).

== Deaths ==
- May 21 – Charlie Poole, banjo player and leader of The North Carolina Ramblers (heart attack)
