= Am Brunnen vor dem Tore =

German poem and song, part of Winterreise, by Wilhelm Müller and Franz Schubert

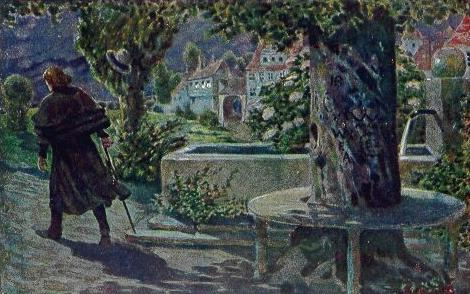
Am Brunnen vor dem Tore (1822). 1917 welfare postcard by the German Colonial Warriors' Donation, based on a painting by Hans Baluschek (1870–1935) from the series Folk Songs in Pictures

"Am Brunnen vor dem Tore" ("At the Well in Front of the Gate") is the opening verse of a German song, known both as a art song and a folk song. Its original title is "Der Lindenbaum" (The Linden Tree). The text was written by Wilhelm Müller as part of his poetry cycle Winterreise (Winter Journey). Franz Schubert set the entire cycle to music under the title Winterreise, including "Der Lindenbaum" as an art song. In its most popular arrangement by Friedrich Silcher, the work became a folk song, with the opening verse commonly used as its title.

== Müller's poem ==
Wilhelm Müller first published the poem as "Der Lindenbaum" in Urania – Pocketbook for the Year 1823, one of the popular pocketbooks of the early 19th century that contained poems, stories, and essays across hundreds of pages. It appeared as the fifth poem in a cycle titled Wanderlieder von Wilhelm Müller. Die Winterreise. In 12 Liedern (Wandering Songs by Wilhelm Müller. The Winter Journey. In 12 Songs). The text was later republished unchanged, edited by Christian G. Ackermann in Dessau and dedicated to Carl Maria von Weber, in an expanded 24-poem version of Winterreise in the second volume of Poems from the Posthumous Papers of a Traveling Horn Player in 1824.

=== Text ===
Am Brunnen vor dem Tore there stands a linden tree: I dreamed in its shade So many a sweet dream.
I carved into its bark So many a loving word; In joy and sorrow It drew me ever toward.
I had to wander past today In the deep of night, And even in the darkness I closed my eyes tight.
And its branches rustled, As if calling out to me: Come here to me, companion, Here you'll find your peace!
The cold winds blew Straight into my face; My hat flew from my head, I did not turn back.
Now I am many hours Far from that place, And still I hear it rustling: You'd find peace there!

=== Metrics and form ===
The poem adheres strictly to a well-established formal pattern of Müller's time: four-line stanzas with alternating two- and one-syllable endings (alternation), where the final syllables of the second and fourth lines rhyme. The text follows a consistent upbeat meter of iambs with three stresses per line.

This form is known as the folk song stanza. While "folk songs" do not adhere to a single form—evident in the varied meters, rhyme schemes, and stanza forms in collections like Des Knaben Wunderhorn—the folk song stanza was popular among Romantics for its lyrical, singable simplicity. An example is Joseph von Eichendorff's earlier poem "Das zerbrochene Ringlein" (The Broken Ring), which begins "In a cool valley/There turns a millwheel", echoing "Der Lindenbaum". Müller employs this form rigidly, avoiding variations.

Nearly all poems in Winterreise follow a similar metrical and formal structure. As Rolf Vollmann notes, the "steady flow of verses" contrasts with the cycle's dark themes, creating a striking effect, even described as "horrifying". Erika von Borries argues that this contrast between the calm verse flow and unsettling content gives the cycle a "haunting and alienating" expression.

=== Context ===
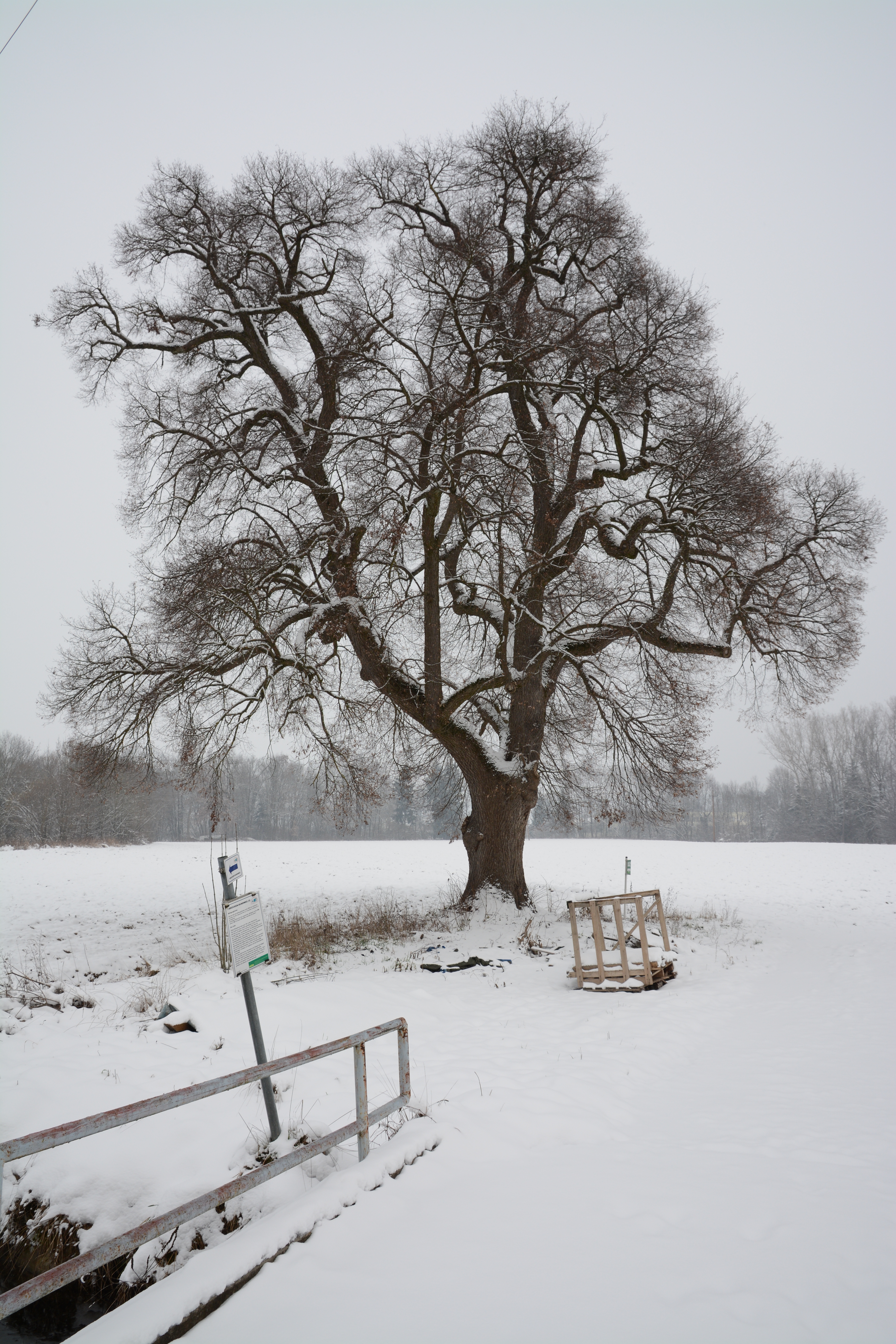
Context of the song – A journey in winter

"Der Lindenbaum" is a station in the loosely structured narrative of Müller's cycle. Before the cycle begins, the protagonist, a young man embodying the lyrical I, has experienced a failed love relationship. The first song, "Good Night", sets the scene: the "I" leaves the beloved's family home in a winter night, embarking on a lonely, aimless journey depicted through the cycle's poems, including frozen rivers, snowy peaks, villages, cemeteries, and the linden tree.

"Winterreise" has been described as a "monodrama" or a series of "persona poems". The lyrical I speaks only to itself, nature, or its heart. Recurring motifs include love and longing for death, the contrast between the frozen winter landscape and flowing emotions (especially tears), defiance and resignation, and compulsive wandering.

The cycle features linguistic contrasts (hot tears vs. snow, freezing vs. melting), typical of folk songs. Erika von Borries notes that Müller, within familiar forms, conveys modern experiences. The motifs of dream and rest in "Der Lindenbaum" recur with varied meanings, reflecting an unreliable world.

Achim Goeres interprets the "winter" in the cycle (and in Heinrich Heine's Germany. A Winter's Tale) as a metaphor for the Restoration politics post-Congress of Vienna. The political "winter" contrasts with "May" as a symbol of hope. Harry Goldschmidt describes the cycle's political dimension:

In its unrepeatable unity of verse and music, Winterreise offers one of the most shattering, if not the most shattering, artistic testimony of the political unfreedom that Heine identified as the true cause of romantic irony and world-weariness. ... What truly drives him, preventing rest even in the 'merciless tavern', the cold inn of death, and ultimately makes him a companion of the beggar and hurdy-gurdy man, is the crushing weight of a universal fate.

Müller's "Winterreise" appeared in the 1822 banned journal Urania, with one of Müller's texts triggering the ban. Though Schubert was not politically active, he had ties to intellectual opposition circles.

Norbert Michels suggests grouping the poems into sets of four (e.g., "Der Lindenbaum", "Wasserflut", "Auf dem Flusse", and "Rückblick"), with the first poem of each group introducing a new psychological foundation or hope.

=== Structure ===
The poem's temporal structure divides into three parts: the first two stanzas are partly timeless, partly recalling a distant past. The third stanza connects to the "Winterreise" narrative, describing a recent event: passing the linden tree "today". The sixth stanza reflects the present ("now"), looking back.

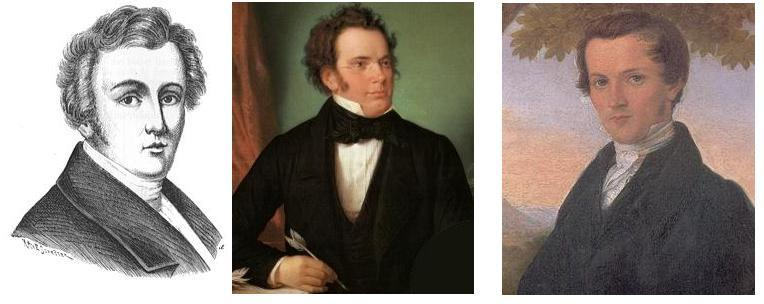
Wilhelm Müller, Franz Schubert, and Friedrich Silcher (from left to right)

The opening verse pair introduces the well, gate, and linden tree as elements of a pleasant place. Conventional imagery (sweet dreams, loving words, joy and sorrow) evokes a past idyllic time. This imagery, often depicted in postcards, contrasts with the harsh natural imagery (rocks, ice, snow) elsewhere in Winterreise, making the linden tree an idyllic oasis.

The third stanza shifts abruptly in time and mood. The static idyll contrasts with the restless movement of the lyrical I passing the tree. In "deep night", the wanderer avoids looking, closing their eyes. Yet the tree's magnetic pull ("it drew me ever toward") persists through sound: the rustling branches, interpreted as a call for peace. Christiane Wittkop highlights the dark u-vowels (to, peace) in this promise of release, contrasted by bright a- and i-vowels in the next stanza (cold, straight, face, winds, blew). The fifth stanza marks the lyrical I's active resistance to the tree's call, choosing to face the cold winds hatless. The sixth stanza returns to timelessness ("always") and the tree's call in the subjunctive ("you'd find"), serving as a lasting reflection from a distance.

=== Formal and thematic interpretations ===
Müller's text and its musical settings by Schubert and Silcher have inspired interpretations in literary criticism, musicology, music sociology, history, German studies, and psychology. The cycle can be analyzed through its use of linguistic forms, intended meanings (individual, universal, or historical-political), and the symbolism of "Der Lindenbaum"'s metaphors.

=== Symbolism ===
Key symbolic elements in Müller's poem, carrying pre-existing meanings in literature and daily life, include:

- The well
- The linden tree
- Wandering
- The hat

These symbols retain their ambivalent meanings in Müller's poetry and Schubert's setting.

The well

The well is a multifaceted symbol in literature and fairy tales, representing ambivalence between life and danger. It denotes a free-flowing spring, a contained source, or a dug well, symbolizing life-giving water, growth, renewal (fountain of youth), and social gathering, as well as love and marriage. Yet its depth suggests hidden, creative, or destructive aspects of the soul.

The linden tree

The linden tree holds special significance in tree symbolism. In Müller's era, it was a symbol of love, a meeting place for lovers, and a benevolent nature. Established in German literature since Walther von der Vogelweide's Under der linden and the 16th-century folk song Es steht ein Lind in jenem Tal, it represented motherhood, fertility, security, harmony, protection, dance, and festivals. It was also a site of justice (linden tree court), community gatherings (Thing), executions, and suicides, contrasting the wanderer's solitude in Müller's text.

The linden, alongside the oak, symbolized German Romanticism and national identity. The ensemble of well, gate, and linden tree frequently appeared around 1800 as an idyllic setting, as in Goethe's Hermann and Dorothea or The Sorrows of Young Werther. The poem's opening stanzas frame this timeless idyll.

The linden promises release from wandering, connoting eternal rest or suicide in the context of Winterreise's death symbols. This interpretation resonates in Thomas Mann's The Magic Mountain, where the narrator reflects:

It was death. […] And yet behind this lovely product stood death. … It might not originally have been sympathetic to death but rather something very popular and life-affirming, yet its spiritual sympathy was with death—pure piety, the essence of meaning at its start, though its consequences led to darkness.

Hans Castorp in The Magic Mountain carries the linden's call into the First World War. Scholars frequently note this death association.

Heinrich Heine later reimagines this rejection of the linden's romantic allure for a contemporary winter:

Moon-drunk linden blossoms,
Pouring out their fragrance,
And with nightingale songs
Leaves and breezes are filled.
...
Oh, my beloved, I'll confess,
I long for a cold north wind
To bring a sudden snowstorm;

And we, covered in furs,
In a brightly adorned sleigh,
With bells jingling, whips cracking,
Gliding over rivers and fields.

Well and Linden

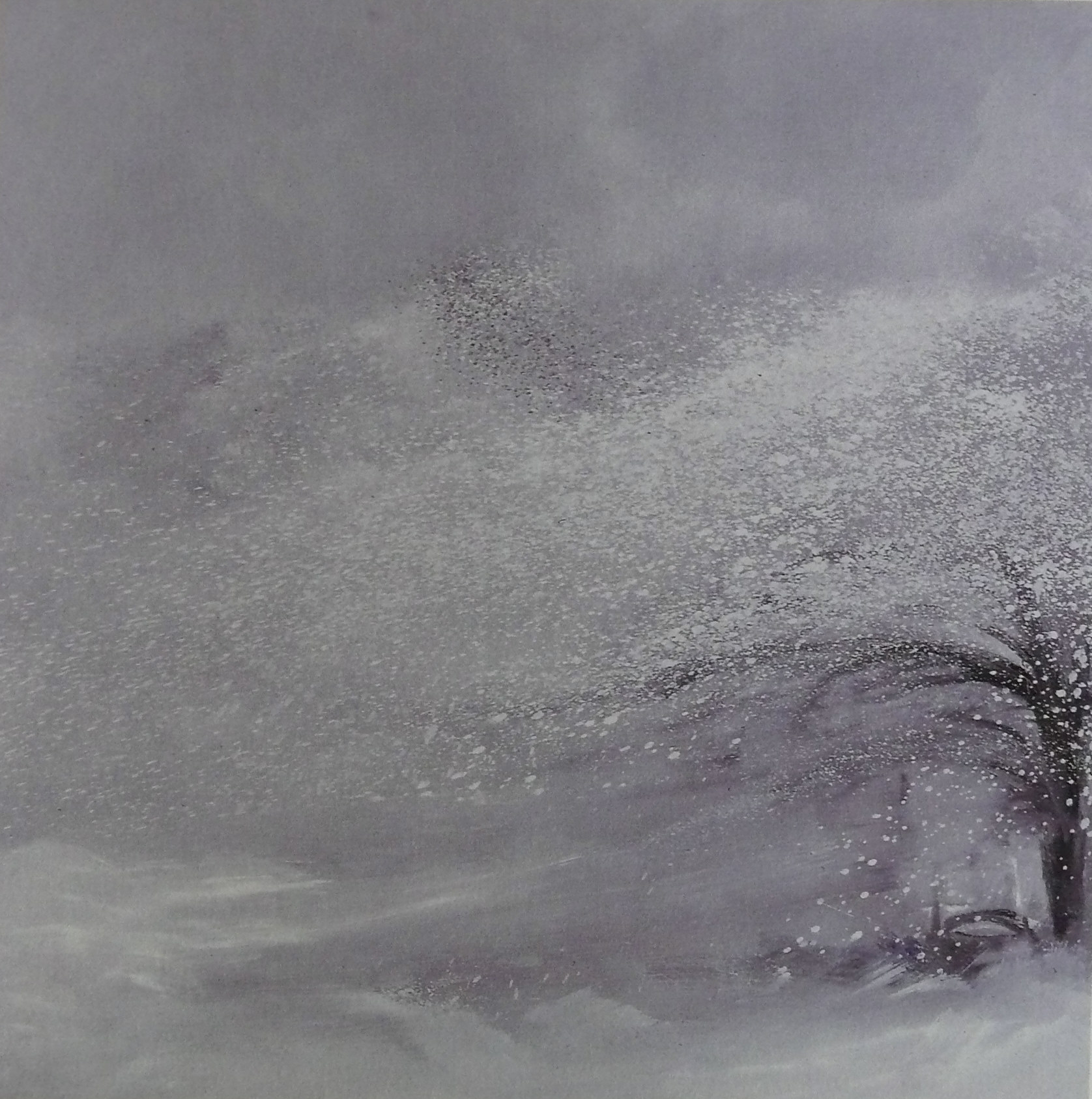
Der Lindenbaum (Winterreise 5). Oil painting by Ingo Kühl, 100 × 100 cm, 1996

The pairing of well and linden as a village centerpiece—used for fetching water, evening chats, or assemblies—is a motif predating the 19th century. It appears in fairy tales like The Frog Prince:

Near the king's castle lay a great dark forest, and in that forest under an old linden tree was a well: when the day was very hot, the king's child went out into the forest and sat by the edge of the cool well.

Wandering

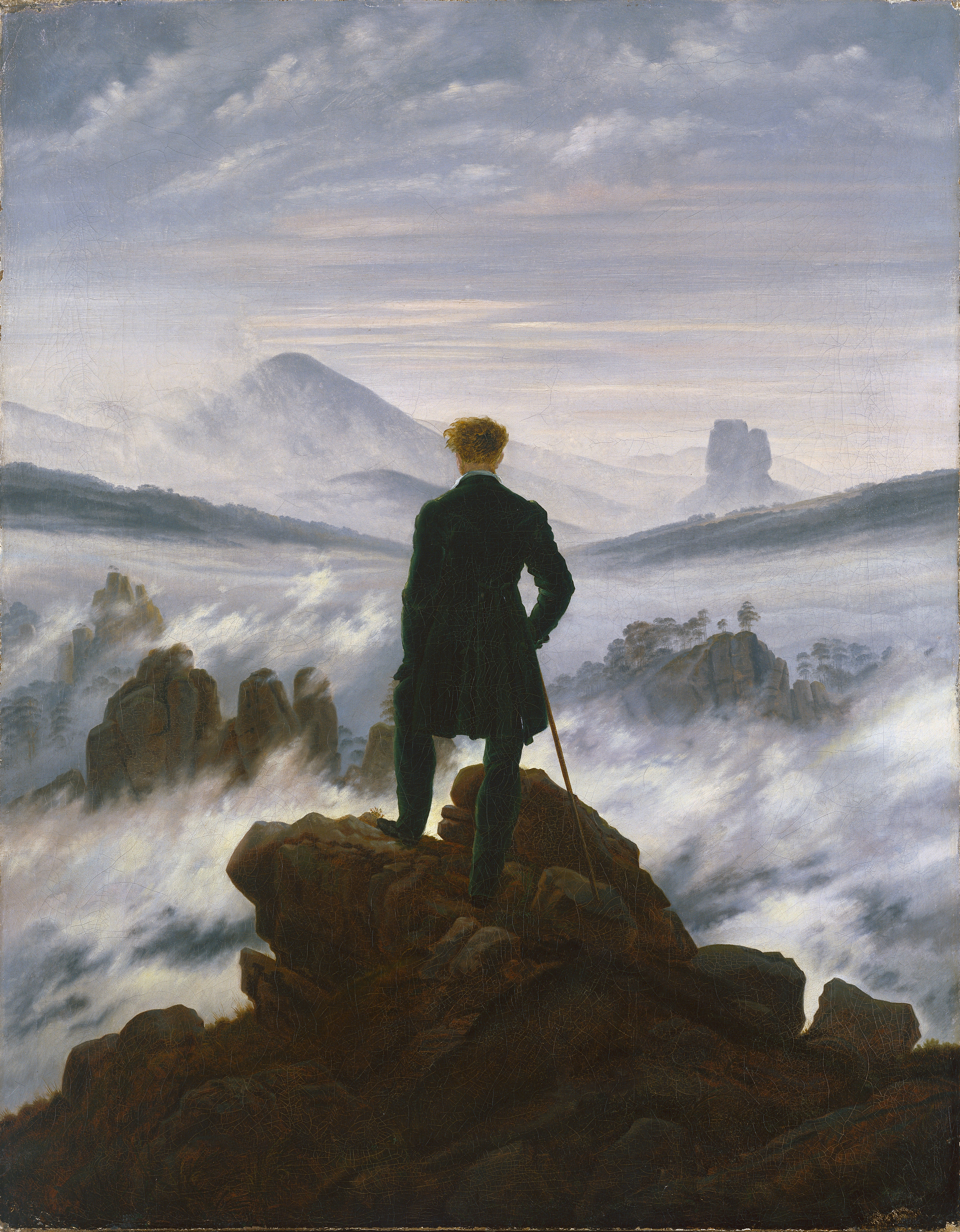
Romantic depiction of wandering – Caspar David Friedrich: Wanderer above the Sea of Fog (1818)

Wandering is central to human self-awareness. In the 19th century, Romanticism shaped the motif of wandering, reflecting inner and external realities. In Schubert's works, like the Wanderer Fantasy, wandering symbolizes the human journey, including danger and death. In Winterreise, it becomes an obsessive compulsion leading to delusion and death.

The Hat

The hat's loss can symbolize a loss of social status, power, or protection, or the abandonment of civic identity. In Jakob van Hoddis's World's End (1911), a similar line, "The citizen's hat flies from his pointed head", reflects this. Per C. G. Jung, it may symbolize losing one's shadow. Post-Napoleonic hat-wearing (e.g., Hecker hat) signaled democratic ideals.

== Schubert's song ==
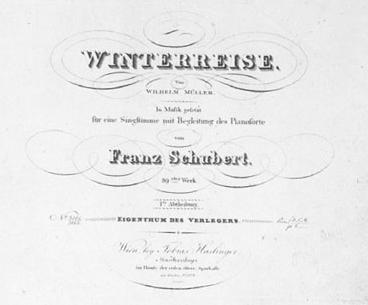
Cover of the first edition of Part 1, January 1828

"Der Lindenbaum", Hans Duhan, 1928

Schubert's song craft was influenced by the Swabian-South German school, the First Berlin Song School, and composers like Beethoven (Adelaide, An die ferne Geliebte), Haydn's English Canzonets, and Mozart's Song of the Violet. His innovative use of the accompanying instrument—with independent motifs and forms—was groundbreaking.

"Der Lindenbaum", composed for high male voice with piano, is no. 5 in Schubert's song cycle Winterreise (Deutsch catalogue No. 911-5). It was first performed among Schubert's friends. Joseph von Spaun recalled Schubert inviting him to Schober's to sing "a cycle of chilling songs".

=== Position in the cycle ===
Schubert composed the first 12 songs of Müller's cycle in early 1827, as published in Urania (1823). After discovering the full 24-song cycle in 1824's Poems from the Posthumous Papers, he set the remaining 12. Unlike Müller's final version, where new songs were inserted, Schubert retained the original order of the first 12, possibly for compositional or textual reasons. This shifts "Der Lindenbaum"s context: in Müller's 1824 version, it precedes the hopeful "Die Post"; in Schubert's, it is followed by the questioning "Wasserflut".

== Silcher's arrangement ==
Friedrich Silcher's 1846 arrangement for four male voices a cappella, based on Schubert's first stanza, made the song a folk favorite, widely printed in school and choir songbooks. Arnold Feil notes:

We hardly hear Schubert's melody as a 'tune' needing no harmony or accompaniment; rather, we hear it as the top voice of a four-part male choir setting that seems wholly a folk song.

Silcher's arrangement appears in Book VIII of his Folk Songs, Collected and Arranged for Four Male Voices (1826–1860). Detached from "Winterreise"'}s context, it omits the title "Der Lindenbaum". Silcher acknowledged his simplification: "Adapted to a folk melody after Franz Schubert by F. S."

== Musical comparison ==
Musical analyses focus on how Schubert and Silcher interpreted Müller's text and how their versions differ in intent and expression.

=== Comparison of Silcher and Schubert ===
The versions differ in form, melody, harmony, and rhythm. Schubert's piano accompaniment for solo voice contrasts with Silcher's choral arrangement.

=== Isolation from the cycle ===
Extracting a single song from a cycle disrupts its intended context, losing motivic, tonal, and rhythmic connections. The linden tree's E-major tonality, framed by C-minor (Erstarrung) and E-minor (Wasserflut), loses its contrast in Silcher's isolated setting. Its role as a turning point from frozen to thawing imagery is also lost, as is its major-key contrast within the cycle's minor-key "spell". Hans Gál notes the cycle's melancholic tone, punctuated by brighter moments like "Der Lindenbaum":

This is an abyss of self-torment that almost evokes shame. The verses carry a hint of tragic irony, which in the music becomes naked despair. ... How wisely the few brighter episodes like "Der Lindenbaum", "Frühlingstraum", and "Die Post" are distributed, and how moving these moments are, where the melancholic's will to live still finds solace.

Silcher omits Schubert's dramatic middle section (mm. 53–65, "The cold winds blew ...").

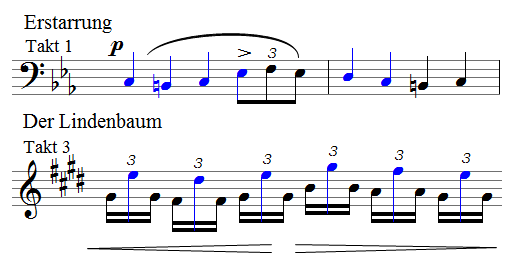
Highlighted motivic connections in "Erstarrung" and "Der Lindenbaum" (Audio examples with both hands)

Motivic links, like the second step in "Erstarrung"'s left hand echoed in "Der Lindenbaum"'s upper voice, or the triadic triplet in "Der Lindenbaum" recurring in "Wasserflut", are lost in Silcher's version.

=== Melodic differences ===
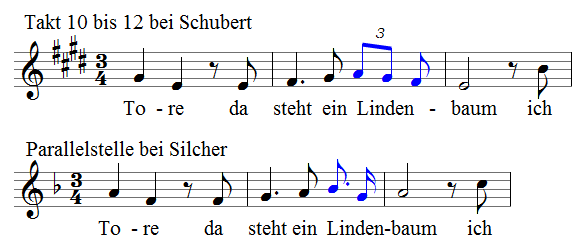
Highlighted melodic differences in Schubert and Silcher (Audio examples)

The melodies are 90% identical, but key differences at harmonic turning points are significant. In measure 11, Schubert uses a dotted quarter note and eighth note followed by a downward eighth-note triplet (A–G♯–F♯), while Silcher uses a dotted eighth and sixteenth note in a third step (B–G). In measure 23, Schubert's complex rhythm contrasts with Silcher's simpler version for singability.

=== Harmonic differences ===
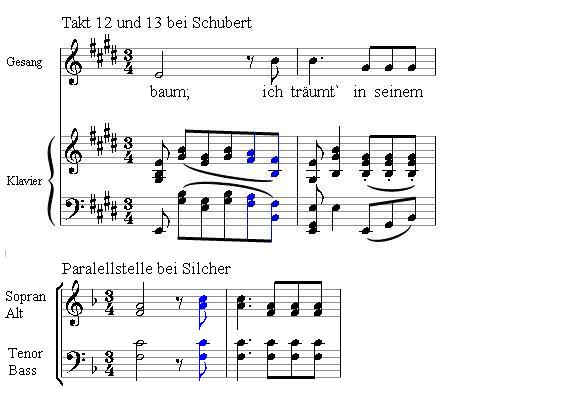
Harmonic differences in Schubert and Silcher (Audio examples)

Harmonic differences, though minor, occur at key points. In measure 12, Schubert ends on the tonic E-major, shifting to the dominant B-major, while Silcher remains in the tonic (F-major). Silcher's adherence to conventional harmonic rules contrasts with Schubert's expressive flexibility.

=== Formal, rhythmic, and instrumentation differences ===
Schubert divides the six stanzas into four musical parts, varying rhythm, harmony, and dynamics, creating a varied strophic song. Silcher's version, a simple strophic song, repeats the same music for all stanzas. Schubert's interludes and dramatic middle section are absent in Silcher's arrangement.

== Reception history ==
Schubert's song inspired composers like Gustav Mahler's Songs of a Wayfarer, which echoes "Der Lindenbaum". Anton Webern also orchestrated "Winterreise". The song became a choral staple, though often romanticized, losing its ambivalence. In the 1916 singspiel Das Dreimäderlhaus, Schubert has Franz von Schober sing "Der Lindenbaum" as a love declaration.

In Thomas Mann's The Magic Mountain, "Der Lindenbaum" is a leitmotif, symbolizing Hans Castorp's time in the sanatorium. It is also referenced in Doctor Faustus. The 1952 Heimatfilm Am Brunnen vor dem Tore takes its name from a guesthouse inspired by the song.

Modern interpretations include Hans Zender's 1993 "composed interpretation" for tenor and small orchestra, aiming to translate Schubert's intentions into contemporary expression, and Friedhelm Döhl's string quintet combining Müller's text with Georg Trakl's poetry.

== Arrangements and recordings ==
Schubert's "Der Lindenbaum" has been recorded by prominent 20th-century singers across all Vocal ranges, including Hans Hotter, Lotte Lehmann, Peter Anders, and Thomas Hampson, accompanied by pianists like Gerald Moore and Daniel Barenboim. Choral versions include those by Conradin Kreutzer, Ludwig Erk, and others. Franz Liszt's two-hand piano transcription significantly boosted its popularity.

Instrumental arrangements feature the melody played by cello, trombone, violin, clarinet, bassoon, or viola, with accompaniment by string orchestra, piano trio, or guitar.

== Popular culture ==
Pop-classical versions by Helmut Lotti and Nana Mouskouri, and renditions by singer-songwriters like Franz Josef Degenhardt and Konstantin Wecker, exist. A promotional quote from a wind orchestra illustrates modern reinterpretations:

Schubert's 'Lindenbaum' became a unique sonic experience, dressed in new garb by the musicians. Whether in James Last's 'Happy Sound', the tuba-heavy Egerländer style, or the humorous Spike Jones version with whistles, fanfare, and sound effects, the musicians showcased their brilliant technique.

Bad Sooden-Allendorf claims Müller wrote the poem at its Zimmersbrunnen, though no evidence supports this. The Höldrichsmühle guesthouse in Hinterbrühl claims to be the site of Schubert's composition, also without evidence.

In the German version of The Simpsons episode "Homer's Odyssey" (7G03), Bart Simpson raps a modified version of the song.

At the well before the big gate, uff, there stands a totally awesome linden tree, oh yea, I dreamed in its shade, so many a sweet dream, so many a sweet dream under this totally awesome linden tree, oh yea, oh yea.

== Publications ==
- "Wanderlieder von Wilhelm Müller. Die Winterreise. In 12 Liedern". In: Urania. Pocketbook for the Year 1823. New Series, Fifth Year. Brockhaus, Leipzig 1823, pp. 207–222. Including: "Der Lindenbaum", pp. 214–215 (digitale-sammlungen.de)
- Wilhelm Müller: "Poems from the Posthumous Papers of a Traveling Horn Player". Vol. Two: Songs of Life and Love. Christian Georg Ackermann, Dessau 1824. Including: "Der Lindenbaum", pp. 83–84 (digitale-sammlungen.de)
