= So nimm denn meine Hände =

1862 song

- Christian hymn
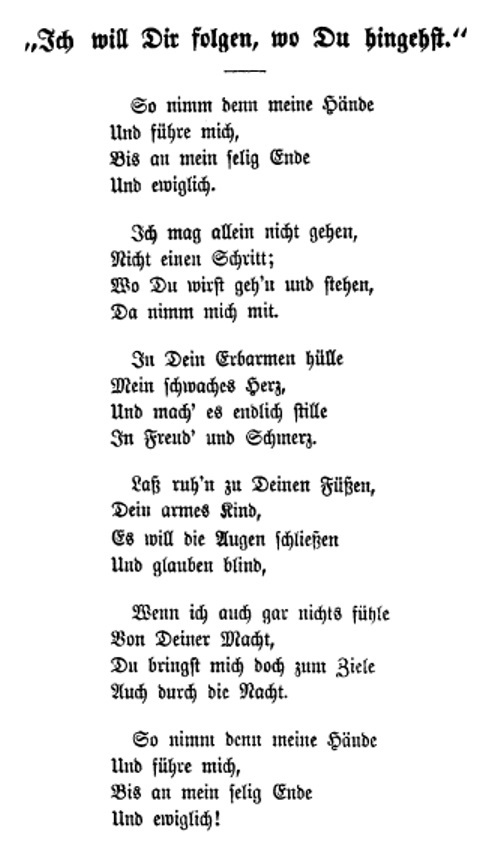
- Original print in Maiblumen, 1862
- English: "Take Thou my hand, o Father"
- Written: 1862
- Text: by Julie Hausmann
- Language: German
- Based on: Luke 9:57
- Meter: 7 4 7 4
- Melody: by Friedrich Silcher
- Composed: 1943

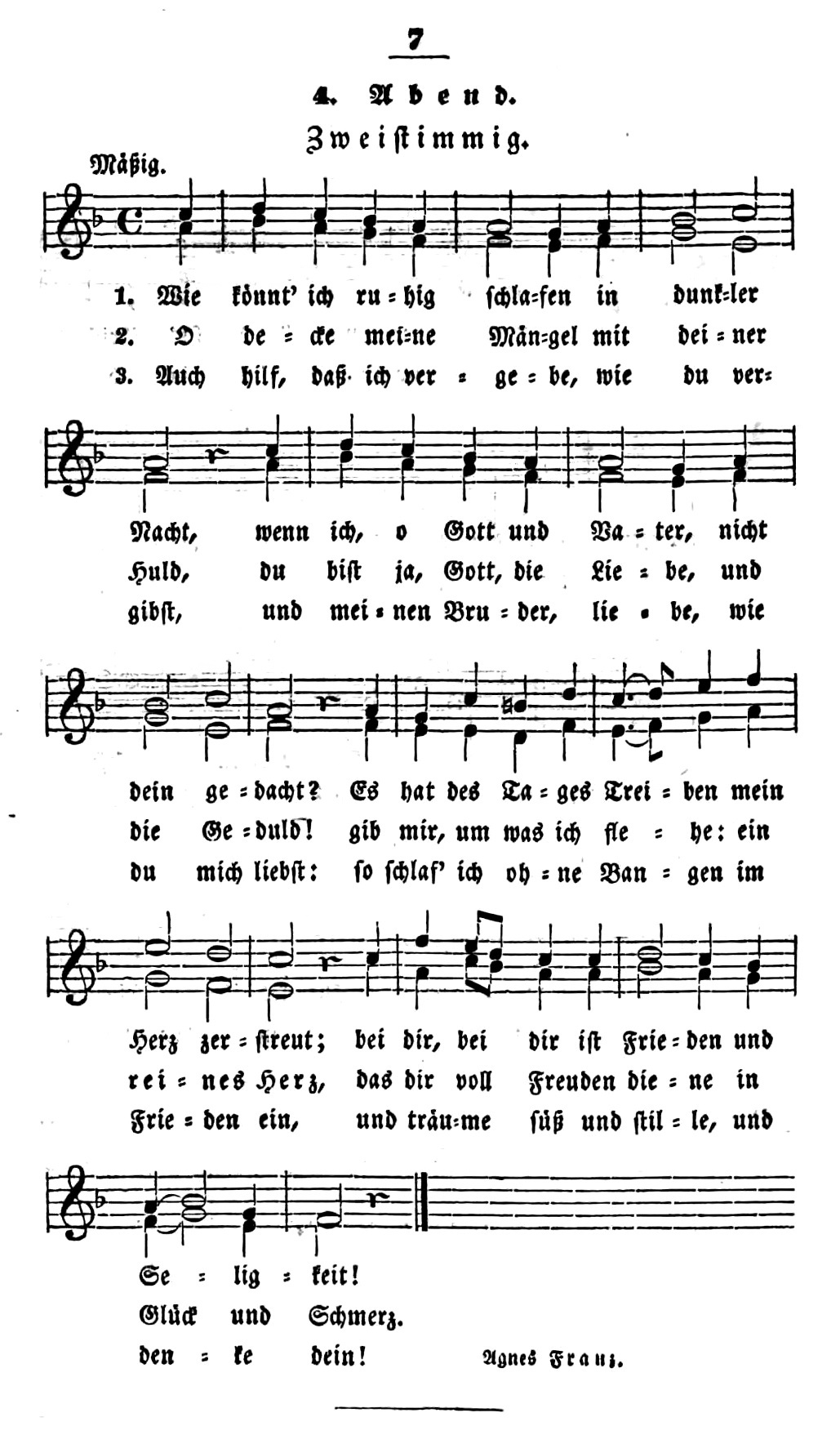
Friedrich Silcher, melody in a two-part setting to a children's prayer by Agnes Franz, 1843

"So nimm denn meine Hände" (So take my hands then) is a Christian hymn often sung at funerals. The text by Julie Hausmann was first printed in 1862. The melody by Friedrich Silcher appeared already in 1843 with a different text. The song is well-known beyond churchgoers. It was translated into English as "Take Thou my hand, o Father", and into many other languages.

== History ==
Julie Hausmann, a Baltic German, was influenced by Pietism. She wrote sacred poems for herself, but agreed to an anonymous publication by Gustav Knak, entitled Maiblumen. Lieder einer Stillen im Lande (May Flowers. Song by a Quiet Country Woman.) in 1862. The term "Die Stillen im Lande" was often applied to Pietists in general, but was also appropriate for the reticent and withdrawn woman.

The exact date and reasons for "So nimm denn meine Hände" are not known. The poetry expresses faith in the guidance by an addressed "You". The Biblical header, "Ich will Dir folgen, wo Du hingehst" (I will follow you wherever you go, Luke 9:56–57) identifies the You as Jesus. This quotes a follower of Jesus, who promises to follow unconditionally. Another Biblical reference may be the story of Martha and Mary, Luke 10:38–42), with Mary listening to Jesus in a position at his feet as the fourth stanza describes. Legend has it that Hausmann wanted to marry a missionary in Africa, but found him dead when she arrived.

In the first publication, the poem has six stanzas of four lines each, with the final stanza repeating the first as an affirmation. The rhyme scheme fit no traditional hymn tune. Friedrich Silcher wrote a melody published 1843 a collection Zwölf Kinderlieder für Schule und Haus, zwei- drei- und vierstimmig componiert (Twelve children's songs for school and home, composed for two, three and four parts). It was combined with the text "Wie könnt ich ruhig schlafen in dunkler Nacht, wenn ich, o Gott und Vater, nicht dein gedacht?" (How could a sleep peacefully in dark night if I had not thought of you, o God and Father), an evening prayer for children by Agnes Franz. It is not known when Hausmann's text was combined with Silcher's melody. In 1870 at least both were firmly together, now as three stanzas of eight lines each due to the longer melody.

While the song soon became popular, it was included in official hymnals only with hesitation. The Deutsches Evangelisches Gesangbuch of 1915 and its regional versions included it as a "Geistliches Volkslied", a sacred Volkslied or popular song which was not intended for use in church services. It was not included in the general part (Stammteil) of the 1950 Evangelisches Kirchengesangbuch (EKG). In the 1980s, Protestants who were requested to name a sacred song they knew mentioned "So nimm denn meine Hände" as No. 3, after "Ein feste Burg" and "Lobe den Herren". The 1993 Evangelisches Gesangbuch then lists it as a hymn (EG 376) in the section Glaube – Liebe – Hoffnung: Angst und Vertrauen (Faith – Love – Hope: Anxiety and Trust), not under Sterben und ewiges Leben (Death and eternal life). In the regional section of the Catholic hymnal Gotteslob of the Diocese of Hamburg it is listed as GL 851 under Vertrauen und Trost (Trust and Consolation).

In a 2019 survey in Germany, "So nimm denn meine Hände" was named No. 7 of musical pieces suitable for memorial services, following Frank Sinatra's "My Way" as No. 6.

== Translations ==
The song was translated into several languages. An early translation into English was made by Herman H. Brueckner as "Take Thou my hand, o Father". Elmer Leon Jorgenson translated it to "Take Thou My Hand, and Lead Me", published in Great Songs of the Church in 1921. In subsequent editions of the hymnal, the song changes number, but it was omitted in the 1937 "Number Two" edition, which was reissued in 1974. The hymn has also been translated by Martha D. Lange, whose version appears in Great Songs of the Church Revised in 1986.

It was also translated into French, Italian, Dutch, Swedish, Norwegian, and Czech ("Ó ujmi ruku moji" by Josef Baštecký in 1871), among others. A 1876 Danish translation by Emil Clausen, "Så tag mig da ved hånden, og led du mig" was included in the Danish hymnal Den Danske Salmebog in 1953, and retained in the 2002 edition.
