= Robert Roberthin =

German Baroque poet

- Born: 3 March 1600; Saalfeld (Zalewo)
- Died: 7 April 1648 (aged 48); Königsberg (Kaliningrad), Duchy of Prussia
- Occupations: Geheimrat, poet

Robert Roberthin (3 March 1600 – 17 April 1648) was a German Baroque poet. He wrote under his own name, as well as the anagram Berrintho.

== Course of life ==
Roberthin was the son of a Lutheran pastor. In 1616 the Roberthin family moved to Königsberg. In 1617 Robert Roberthin started studying law at the University of Königsberg. The next year he continued his studies at Leipzig University and in 1620 at the Jean Sturm Gymnasium in Strasbourg, where he found lodgings with the linguist Matthias Bernegger. He would maintain a correspondence with Bernegger for many years. Roberthin's father died in 1620 and in 1621 Roberthin returned to Königsberg without a diploma. There he obtained a job as a private tutor.

In the years 1625-1633 he travelled extensively. He departed together with his patron's son. They visited the Dutch Republic. There he found a new patron, with whom he travelled to England. From England he crossed the Channel to France, where he took up several jobs until he returned to Königsberg in 1630. In the same year he departed again with a new pupil to travel to the Dutch Republic, France and Italy. In the Dutch Republic he befriended Hugo Grotius, who had temporarily returned from banishment. They kept corresponding until Grotius' death in 1645. Roberthin returned in 1633 and the next year he found a job as a secretary at the Order of Saint John in Sonnenburg (Słońsk). In 1636 he became court clerk at the court of justice in Königsberg. In 1639 he married Ursula Vogt. By now he was influential enough to get his friend Simon Dach appointed professor of poetry at Königsberg University in 1639.

In 1636 he founded the Gesellschaft der Sterblichkeit Beflissener (‘Society of Zealous Mortals’), together with a group of friends. The society was a meeting point for poets and musicians who were interested in religious poetry and music. The ten to twelve members met regularly in the garden of Heinrich Albert, the Königsberg Cathedral organist. Albert grew pumpkins, so the circle of friends also took the name Kürbishütte (‘pumpkins greenhouse’). Later scholars often called them the Königsberger Dichterkreis (Königsberg Circle of Poets). Its members recited their poems and made music together. In 1641 the municipal authorities put an end to these meetings by expropriating the garden to build houses there. Other well-known members apart from Roberthin and Albert were the poets Simon Dach and Valentin Thilo the Younger and the Kapellmeister Johann Stobäus. Though their meeting point had disappeared, the Kürbishütte members kept in touch after 1641.

In 1645 Roberthin was appointed Geheimrat of prince-elector Frederick William of Brandenburg-Prussia and first secretary of the Prussian government. In 1648 he suddenly died of a stroke.

At Roberthin's request Simon Dach wrote already many years before his death the song that had to be performed at his burial. Heinrich Albert took care of the melody. The result was Ich bin ja Herr in deiner Macht, which is still being sung in the German Lutheran church.

== Works ==
One of Roberthin's friends was the Silesian poet Martin Opitz, whom he met in Strasbourg. His own poems shown Opitz’ influence. Dach and the other members of the Kürbishütte shared his admiration for Opitz. In 1638 Opitz visited Königsberg and enjoyed their hospitality.

Probably not all of what Roberthin wrote has been preserved. The biggest part of what is left can be found in the eight volumes of Arien und Melodeien, the bundles of songs by Heinrich Albert, who put many of Roberthin's poems to music. In Albert's bundles Roberthin's songs are usually ascribed to Berrintho, Roberthin's anagram. Also some occasional poetry, usually printed on one sheet of paper in a limited edition, is still extant.

Together with Johann Freinsheim he published an edition of the works of the Latin poet Publius Annius Florus in 1632.

== Literature ==
- Oesterley (1889). "Roberthin, Robert" . Allgemeine Deutsche Biographie (in German). Vol. 28. Leipzig: Duncker & Humblot. pp. 722–723.
- Alfred Kelletat (editor), Simon Dach und der Königsberger Dichterkreis, Reclam, Stuttgart, 1986 (anthology from the work of Dach and his circle of friends), pp. 301–302 (short biography), pp. 231–245 (poems). ISBN 3-15-008281-1.
