= Ännchen von Tharau =

Poem by Simon Dach

"Ännchen von Tharau" (Low Prussian: Anke van Tharaw, lit. 'Annie from Tharau') is a 17-stanza poem by the East Prussian poet Simon Dach. The namesake of the poem is Anna Neander (1615–1689), the daughter of the (then) Lutheran pastor of Tharau, East Prussia (now known as Vladimirovo in the Kaliningrad Oblast of Russia). The poem was written on the occasion of her marriage in 1636 to her father's pastoral successor and had been set to music as a song by 1642.

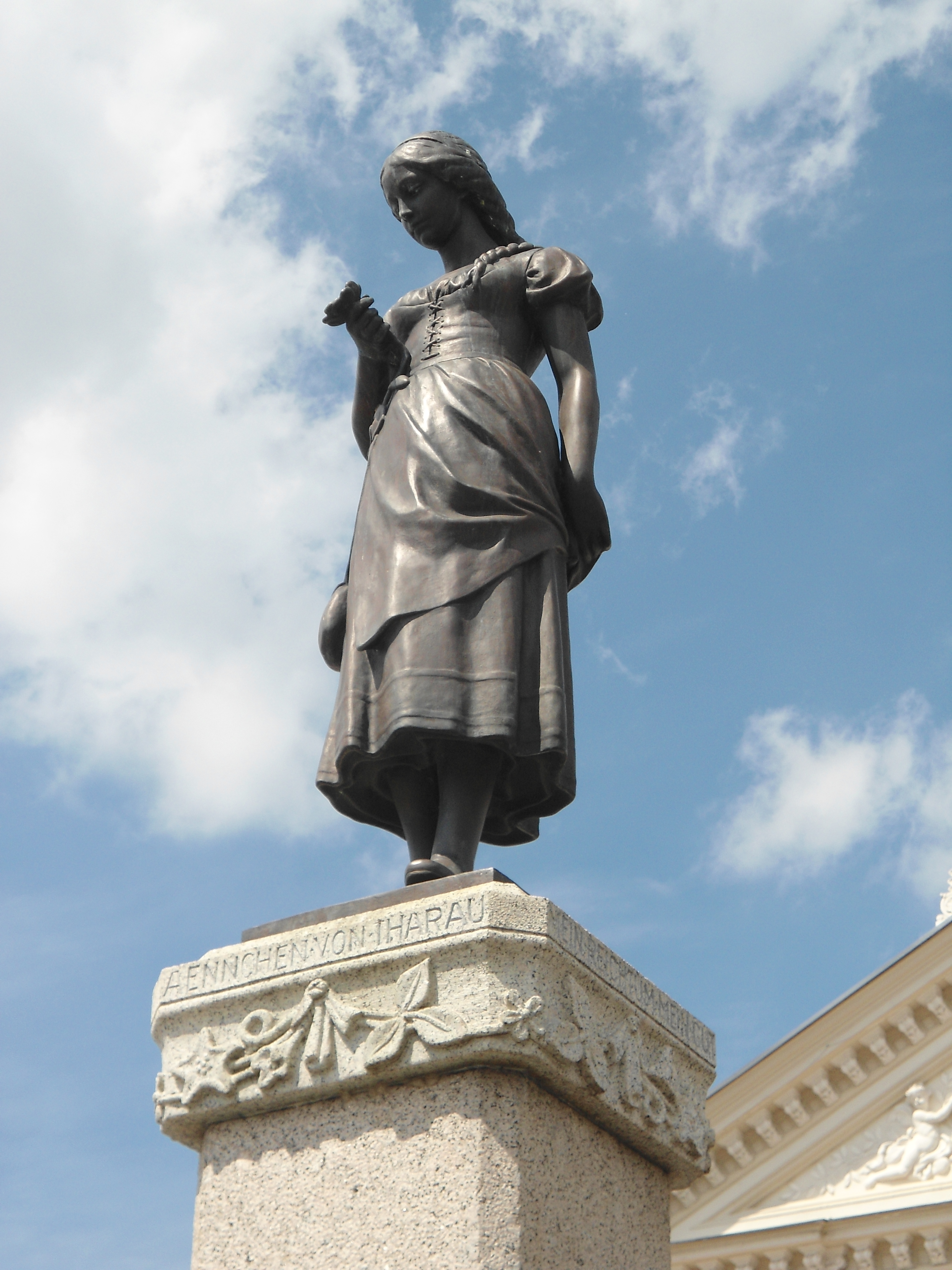
Statue outside the theatre of Klaipėda

Heinrich Albert set the poem to music, based on an earlier folk tune. Johann Gottfried Herder translated the words from East Prussian into standard German and published it in his collection of Volkslieder in 1778. The song is now known with a melody that Friedrich Silcher composed in 1827. Silcher used the first ten verses to form four stanzas: he combined verses 1+2, 4+5, 6+7, 8+9 for the first section, an eight-bar repeat with different text each time, and he used the third and tenth verses as an alternating refrain the final eight bars.

Henry Wadsworth Longfellow's translation of the poem into English was published in 1846.

The 1954 Heimatfilm Annie from Tharau was inspired by the poem, and the Rosa × alba cultivar Ännchen von Tharau is named after the song.

The city of Klaipėda in Lithuania, formerly Memel, has a statue named after the poem (Lithuanian: Taravos Anikė), which stands outside the theatre.

== Standard-German Text and Albert's melody ==
Ännchen von Tharau ist, die mir gefällt;
Sie ist mein Leben, mein Gut und mein Geld.

Ännchen von Tharau hat wieder ihr Herz
Auf mich gerichtet in Lieb' und in Schmerz.

Ännchen von Tharau, mein Reichthum, mein Gut,
Du meine Seele, mein Fleisch und mein Blut!

Käm' alles Wetter gleich auf uns zu schlahn,
Wir sind gesinnet bei einander zu stahn.

Krankheit, Verfolgung, Betrübniß und Pein
Soll unsrer Liebe Verknotigung seyn.

Recht als ein Palmenbaum über sich steigt,
Je mehr ihn Hagel und Regen anficht;

So wird die Lieb' in uns mächtig und groß
Durch Kreuz, durch Leiden, durch allerlei Noth.

Würdest du gleich einmal von mir getrennt,
Lebtest, da wo man die Sonne kaum kennt;

Ich will dir folgen durch Wälder, durch Meer,
Durch Eis, durch Eisen, durch feindliches Heer.

Ännchen von Tharau, mein Licht, meine Sonn,
Mein Leben schließ' ich um deines herum.

Was ich gebiete, wird von dir gethan,
Was ich verbiete, das läst du mir stahn.

Was hat die Liebe doch für ein Bestand,
Wo nicht Ein Herz ist, Ein Mund, Eine Hand?

Wo man sich peiniget, zanket und schlägt,
Und gleich den Hunden und Kazen beträgt?

Ännchen von Tharau, das woll'n wir nicht thun;
Du bist mein Täubchen, mein Schäfchen, mein Huhn.

Was ich begehre, ist lieb dir und gut;
Ich laß den Rock dir, du läßt mir den Hut!

Dies ist uns Ännchen die süsseste Ruh,
Ein Leib und Seele wird aus Ich und Du.

Dies macht das Leben zum himmlischen Reich,
Durch Zanken wird es der Hölle gleich.

Annie of Tharaw, my true love of old,
She is my life, and my goods, and my gold. [i.e., my life and all I possess]

Annie of Tharaw her heart once again
To me has surrendered in joy and in pain.

Annie of Tharaw, my riches, my good,
Thou, O my soul, my flesh, and my blood!

Then come the wild weather, come sleet or come snow,
We will stand by each other, however it blow.

Oppression, and sickness, and sorrow, and pain
Shall be to our true love as links to the chain.

As the palm-tree standeth so straight and so tall,
The more the hail beats, and the more the rains fall,—

So love in our hearts shall grow mighty and strong,
Through crosses, through sorrows, through manifold wrong.

Shouldst thou be torn from me to wander alone
In a desolate land where the sun is scarce known,—

Through forests I'll follow, and where the sea flows,
Through ice, and through iron, through armies of foes

Annie of Tharaw, my light and my sun,
The threads of our two lives are woven in one

Whate'er I have bidden thee thou hast obeyed,
Whatever forbidden thou hast not gainsaid

How in the turmoil of life can love stand,
Where there is not one heart, and one mouth, and one hand?

Some seek for dissension, and trouble, and strife;
Like a dog and a cat live such man and wife

Annie of Tharaw, such is not our love;
Thou art my lambkin, my chick, and my dove

Whate'er my desire is, in thine may be seen;
I am king of the household, and thou art its queen.

It is this, O my Annie, my heart's sweetest rest,
That makes of us twain but one soul in one breast.

This turns to a heaven the hut where we dwell;
While wrangling soon changes a home to a hell.
