= Fleming and Townsend =

Fleming and Townsend was a musical duo made up of Reece Fleming (1909–1958) and Respers Townsend (1909–1974). They were stars of the new record and radio era, finding success playing the blues and adapting the blue yodels of Jimmie Rodgers in a harmonizing duet. Fleming and Townsend were from around Covington, Tennessee. Fleming sang lead on the guitar while Townsend preferred harmony, the harmonica, mandolin and kazoo. They got their start playing for dances in different communities before getting on the radio. They landed their first recording deal with Victor in 1930 and their first release sold over 20,000 copies. They also recorded in Atlanta at Egleston Hall in 1932 for Ralph Peer. When their recording career ended they still kept in touch playing at home and going quail hunting and fishing together. Townsend became a farmer again before working with heavy equipment while Fleming continued playing music in The Tennesseans (known later as the Star Rhythm Boys).

While influential at the time their contribution has largely been forgotten.

== See also ==
- 1931 in country music
- Allen Brothers
