= Simon Dach =

German lyrical poet and hymnwriter

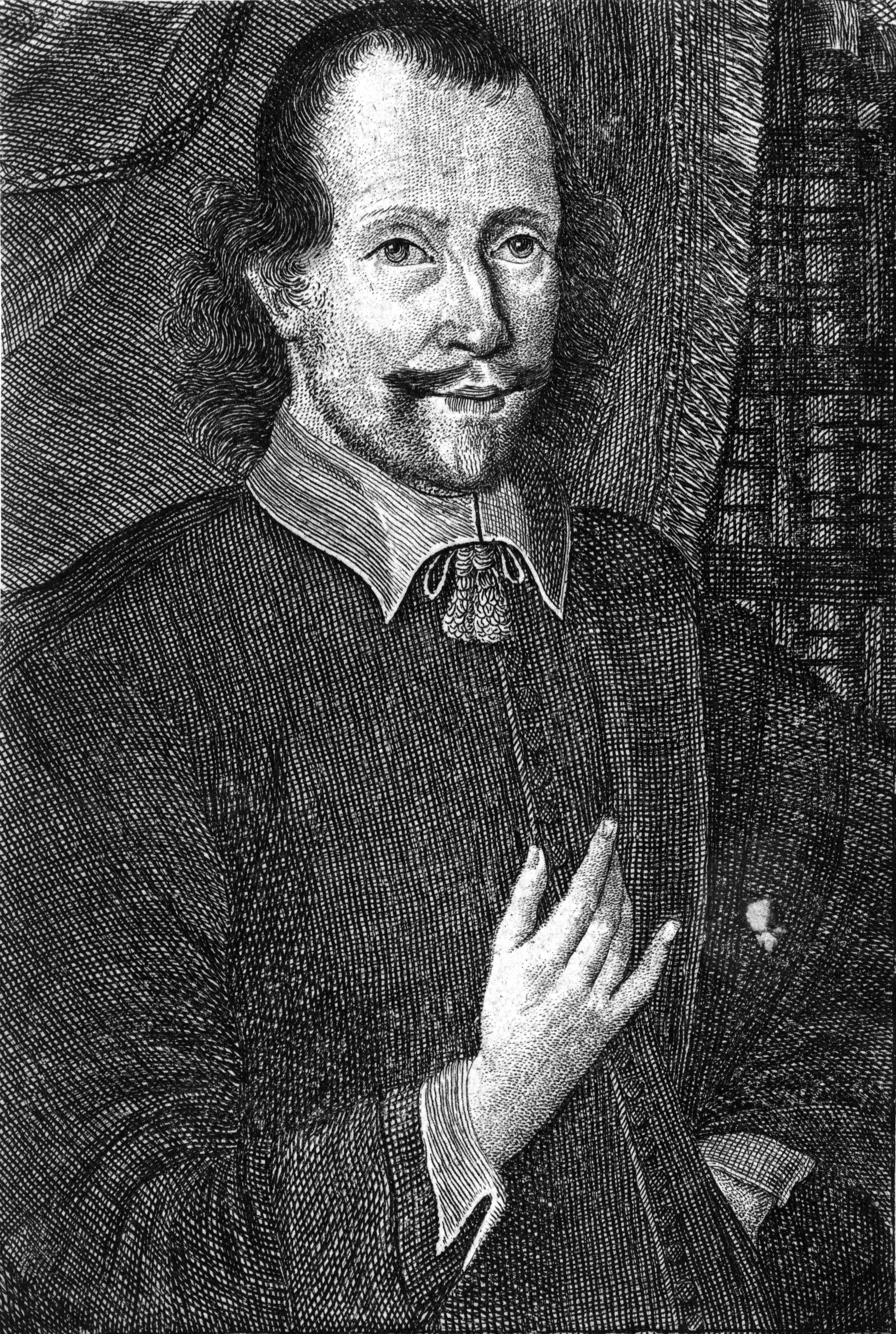
- Born: 29 July 1605; Memel, Duchy of Prussia (modern Klaipėda, Lithuania)
- Died: 15 April 1659 (aged 53); Königsberg, Duchy of Prussia (modern Kaliningrad, Russia)
- Citizenship: Prussian
- Occupations: Professor; poet
- Writing career
- Language: Low German (Low Prussian dialect)
- Genre: Baroque

Simon Dach (29 July 1605 – 15 April 1659) was a German lyrical poet and hymnwriter, born in Memel, Duchy of Prussia (now Klaipėda in Lithuania).

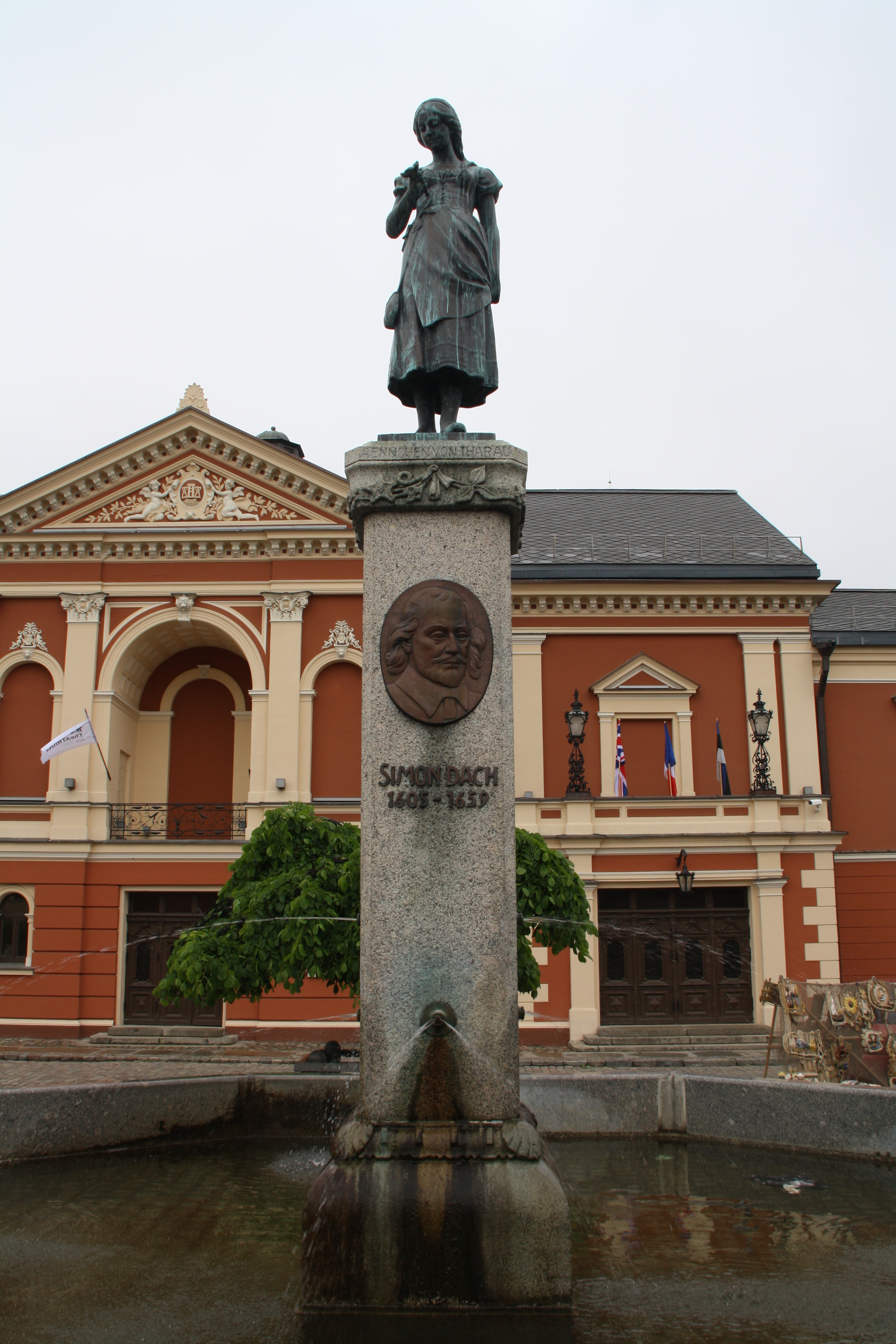
Memorial to Dach in Klaipėda, with statue of Ännchen von Tharau

== Early life ==
Although brought up in humble circumstances (his father was a poorly paid court interpreter for Lithuanian in Memel), he received a classical education in the Domschule of Königsberg (now Kaliningrad, Russia) and in the Latin schools of Wittenberg and Magdeburg, and entered the University of Königsberg in 1626 where he was a student of theology and philosophy. In 1626, he left Magdeburg to escape both the plague and the Thirty Years' War, and returned to his Prussian homeland, settling in Königsberg, where he remained for the rest of his life.

== Mid life ==
After earning his degree, Dach was a private tutor for a time, then was appointed Kollaborator (teacher) in 1633 and co-rector of the Domschule (cathedral school) in Königsberg in 1636. In 1639 he was appointed by Adrian Brauer to the Chair of Poetry at the Albertina University in Königsberg. This was a post he held until his death. Also, in 1640 he received a doctorate from the University.

Part of his official duties as Chair of Poetry was to create poems for various University celebrations, programs, debates and funeral services of his colleagues – all of these written either Latin or Greek. In 1644, he wrote the play Sorbuisa, which celebrated the centennial of the University of Königsberg.

Dach became one of the prominent heads of the musical Kürbishütte, a group that included, among others, George Weissel, Valentin Thilo, and Johann Franck. The summer-house of organist and composer Heinrich Albert became the meeting place of this group of poets, hymnists and musicians, who met in to create new hymns as well as to give readings of their own poetry. This group published eight books of poems and songs from 1638 to 1650, the books meeting with great success. Of the approximately 200 poems and songs contained within the books, Dach had the majority, with 125 being his compositions. The songs and hymns contained in these books, especially those of Dach, were sung throughout Germany and frequently appeared in pirated editions.

== Later life and poetic success ==
In Königsberg he became friends with and collaborated with Heinrich Albert (1604–1651) and Robert Roberthin (1600–1648) and with them formed the Königsberger Dichtergruppe (loosely translated as the "Königsberg Poets' Association"). In 1639 he was appointed professor of poetry at Königsberg through the influence of his friend Roberthin. He sang the praises of the house of the Electors of Brandenburg in a collection of poems entitled Kurbrandenburgische Rose, Adler, Lowe und Scepter (1661), and also produced many occasional poems, several of which became popular; the most famous of them is "Anke von Tharaw öss, de my geföllt" Anke van Tharaw (rendered from Low Saxon by Herder into Standard German as "Ännchen von Tharau"), composed in 1637 in honor of the marriage of a friend.

Among Dach's best-known hymns, many of which are still sung, are the following: "Ich bin ja, Herr, in deiner Macht", "Ich bin bei Gott in Gnaden durch Christi Blut und Tod", and "O, wie selig seid ihr doch, ihr Frommen." In all, he wrote over 150 hymns, and a number of poems, and was considered the leading figure of the hymnists and poets of Königsberg.

== Published works ==
- Handbuch des Kantorendienstes: Einf. u. Handreichung zu einem wiederentdeckten Dienst in d. Gemeinde ISBN 3-87088-144-5

== Poems of note ==
Sonnet
Ueber den Eingang der Schloßbrücke (1641)

Du Seule Brandenburgs, du Preussens Sicherheit,
O Fridrich Wilhelm, Trost und Hoffnung vieler Lande,
Sey willkomm deinem Volck hie an des Pregels Rande!
Des Höchsten Ehrendienst ist wegen dein erfreut.

Verspricht Uns unter Dir die alte güldne Zeit;
Gerechtigkeit und Fried in jedem Ort und Stande
Verknüpffen dir sich fest mit einem güldnen Bande.
Du machst, daß alles wil genesen weit und breit.

In dem dein Eintzug Uns die Hoffnung aber giebet,
So wirstu billich nie von uns auch gnug geliebet;
O leb Uns werthes Haupt, sey Uns ein Sonnenschein,

Der nimmer untergeht! schon jetzt mit deiner Jugend
Dringt Fama durch die Welt, du wirst bey solcher Tugend
Nicht hie nur, sonder auch im Himmel Hertzog seyn.

Lied der Freundschaft

Der Mensch hat nichts so eigen,
So wohl steht ihm nichts an,
Als daß er Treu erzeigen
und Freundschaft halten kann;
Wann er mit seinesgleichen
Soll treten in ein Band,
Verspricht sich nicht zu weichen,
Mit Herzen, Mund und Hand.

Was kann die Freude machen,
Die Einsamkeit verhehlt?
Das gibt ein doppelt Lachen,
Was Freunden wird erzählt.
Der kann sein Leid vergessen,
Der es von Herzen sagt;
Der muß sich selbst zerfressen,
Der in geheim sich nagt.

Die Red' ist uns gegeben,
Damit wir nicht allein
Für uns nur sollen leben
Und fern von Leuten sein;
Wir sollen uns befragen
Und sehn auf guten Rat,
Das Leid einander klagen,
So uns betreten hat.

Gott stehet mir vor allen,
Die meine Seele liebt;
Dann soll mir auch gefallen,
Der mir sehr herzlich gibt;
Mit diesen Bundsgesellen
Verlach' ich Pein und Not,
Geh' auf den Grund der Höllen
Und breche durch den Tod.

Ich hab', ich habe Herzen
So treue, wie gebührt,
Die Heuchelei und Schmerzen
Nie wissentlich berührt;
Ich bin auch ihnen wieder
Von Grund der Seelen hold,
Ich lieb' euch mehr, ihr Brüder,
Als aller Erden Gold.

== Literature ==
- Alexander J. Birt: Simon Dach. Gräfe & Unzer, Königsberg i.P. 1905.
- Bruno Nick: Das Naturgefühl bei Simon Dach. – Greifswald, Univ. Diss., 1911.
- August Gebauer (Hrsg.): Simon Dach und seine Freunde als Kirchenlieddichter. Osiander, Tübingen 1828.
- Heinrich Stiehler: Simon Dach. Hartung, Königsberg i.P., 1896.
- Hermann Österley: Simon Dach; Tübingen 1876.
- Alfred Kelletat (Hrsg.): Simon Dach und der Königsberger Dichterkreis. Stuttgart: Reclam 1986. ISBN 3-15-008281-1
- Alfred Kelletat: Simon Dach und der Königsberger Dichterkreis, P. Reclam jun., 1986, ISBN 3-15-008281-1
- Barbara Sturzenegger: Simon Dach und Paul Fleming: Topoi der Freundschaft im 17. Jahrhundert. Diss. Bern 1996.
- Hermann Oesterley (1876). "Dach, Simon" . Allgemeine Deutsche Biographie (in German). Vol. 4. Leipzig: Duncker & Humblot. pp. 685–688.
- Axel E. Walter (Hrsg.), Simon Dach (1605–1659). Berlin, de Gruyter, 2008.
- Willi Flemming (1957). "Dach, Simon". Neue Deutsche Biographie (in German). Vol. 3. Berlin: Duncker & Humblot. p. 464.
