= Pauline von Brochowska =

German woman writer

Pauline Maria Juliane von Brochowska (14 November 1795 or 1794 – 9 May 1853) was a German woman writer.

== Life ==
Born in Dresden, Brochowska was the daughter of the Royal Saxon Major and later General of the Infantry Vinzenz Bogislaw von Brochowski in Dresden. She received her education from the age of 13, among other places, in the Ursuline convent in Prague. There she fell seriously ill, so that she returned to her parental home after three and a half years. When her father had to go to Poland as a regimental commander, she stayed behind in Dresden with her mother.

On 25 April 1812, she was appointed lady-in-waiting to Princess Amalie of Saxony, later becoming her Lord Chamberlain. She now kept company with the highest figures in society. Encouragement from friends led her to write. A first poem of hers was published in 1819. After the death of her close friend Emilie Hübner, she was stricken with a nervous disease associated with paralysis, from which she recovered only slowly. Her writing turned to more religious motifs during and after overcoming the illness. She wrote numerous poems, which she published in magazines under the pseudonym "Theophania". After her authorship was revealed, she used the pseudonym "Lisa", which she abandoned a short time later.

Brochowska married the Kammerjunker Arthur Otto Alexander von Langenn, Herr auf Wasserburg (1808-1850) on 8 July 1835. Brochowska died in Spain during a visit to a sister.

Brochowska was in contact with other writers of the time, for example Agnes Franz and Theodor Hell. Brochowska wrote the libretto for Amalie von Sachsen's posse mit Gesang The Victory Flag. Today, the SLUB Dresden holds a small part of her estate of letters.

== Work ==
=== Tales ===
In the Dresdner Abendzeitung

- 1819: An Saida und Palmyra, bei der Aufführung der Oper Mahomet, von Winter; An Elise Ehrhardt; Frühlings-Opfer; Zum Charfreitag; Die Genien des Lebens; Lina’s Abschied von ihrem Spiegel; Die Meerfahrt; Triolets; An Agnes Franz; Liebe; Die Kränze; Der Fischer und das Kind
- 1820: An die Meinen; Kränze der Andacht; Mein Reichthum; Triolets; Abschied vom Landleben; An Agnes Franz; Am Allerseelentage; An ein überschicktes Olivenblatt, gepflückt zu Jerusalem; Bei der feierlichen Beisetzung I. K. H. der Prinzessin Mariane von Sachsen, 29 Nov. 1820
- 1821: Die beiden Bäche, nach d. Franz; Die süßen Pfänder, nach dem Spanischen; Frühlingsliedchen; Das stille Haus; Ich denke Dein, Nachruf an Emilie H. zum 4. Dec.
- 1822: Cypressenreis um die Urne Er. Königl. Hoheit des verewigten Prinzen Clemens Maria Joseph, Herzog zu Sachsen, 4 Jan. 1822

In the Iduna

- Vor einem Madonnenbild
- Die Wald-Capelle, eine Romanze

=== Libretti ===
- 1828: Libella (Romantic opera in 2 acts)
- 1837: Der rothe Domino (comic opera in 2 acts)
- 1834: The Victory Flag (operetta in one act)
