= Agnes Franz =

German woman writer

Autograph by Agnes Franz.

Agnes Franz, real name Louise Antoinette Eleonore Konstanze Agnes Franzky, (8 February 1794 – 13 May 1843) was a German writer.

== Life ==
Born in Milicz, Silesia, Franz was the daughter of a Silesian government and court councillor. After the death of her father in 1801, her mother moved with her daughters to Ścinawa.

In 1807, she suffered a serious accident with her travelling carriage and remained physically disabled and suffering for the rest of her life. The family moved to Steinach in 1811 and later to Oberarnsdorf on an uncle's estate. At the outbreak of the German Campaign of 1813, the family fled to Landeck. A short stay in Dresden in 1821 brought her the acquaintance of Johann Friedrich Kind, Pauline von Brochowska and Theodor Hell. Her friendship with Julie von Großmann (1790–1860), who later administered and edited her estate.

When her mother died in 1822, Franz moved in with her sister, who was married in Wesel on the Lower Rhine, as she needed support due to her disability. She lived with her sister's family in Brandenburg between 1830 and 1837. With her small inheritance and great energy, Franz founded and ran a virgins' association and a working school for poor girls in Wesel.

After the death of her brother-in-law in 1837, Franz moved to Breslau together with her sister and her sister's four children. Here, too, Franz became involved and founded a charity school, which she also directed.

At the age of 49, Franz died on 13 May 1843 in Breslau, where her memorial stone is also located in the cemetery of the Elftausend-Jungfrauen-Kirche. The grave itself was levelled during road construction work on the occasion of the widening of Elbingstraße in July 1914.

== Work ==
- Der Sonnenhold. 1821
- Gedichte. 1826.
- Der Christbaum. 1829
- Parabeln. 1829
- Angela. 1831
- Stundenblumen. 1833
- Kinderschatz. 1841
- Vermächtnis an die Jugend. 1841
- Glycerion. 1842
