= Jesse Rogers =

American baseball player

- Catcher/Outfielder
- Born: February 16, 1934; Kansas City, Missouri
- Died: March 30, 2013 (aged 79)
- Batted: Right Threw: Right

Teams
- Kansas City Monarchs (1953–1954)

Jesse James Rogers, Jr. (February 16, 1934 - March 20, 2013) was an American baseball player in the Negro and Minor leagues in the 1950s and 1960s.

== league career ==
A catcher and outfielder, Rogers barnstormed with the Kansas City Monarchs in 1953 and 1954. He was noted for his home run hitting prowess and was nicknamed Mr. Long Ball.

== Minor league career ==
Rogers spent seven years in the minor leagues, playing from 1953 to 1955 and from 1957 to 1960. He began his career in the New York Giants system, playing for the Class-D Oshkosh Giants in 1953 and hitting .276 with 15 home runs in 124 games. He made the Wisconsin State League All-Star team that year. With the Class-C St. Cloud Rox in 1954, Rogers hit .307 with 23 home runs in 128 games and made the Northern League All-Star team. In 1955, he hit .285 with 15 home runs in a season split between the Class-A Wilkes-Barre Barons/Johnstown Johnnies (99 games) and Class-A Sioux City Sous (22 games).

After not playing in 1956, Rogers signed with the Cleveland Indians for 1957 and played for the Class-A Reading Indians, hitting .127 with no home runs in 17 games. He signed with the Chicago Cubs in 1958 and hit .281 with 24 home runs in 128 games for the Class-A Pueblo Bruins. With the Class-A Lancaster Red Roses (100 games) and the Triple-A Fort Worth Cats (13 games) in 1959, he hit .260 with 18 home runs and 64 RBI. He played his final year in 1960, hitting .285 with 23 home runs and 90 RBI for the Double-A San Antonio Missions.

Overall, Rogers hit .280 with 784 hits and 118 home runs in seven minor league seasons.

== Personal ==
Rogers was born in Kansas City, Missouri. He worked 30 years for the U.S. Postal Service, where he retired from in 1989. Rogers married Winifred O. Barnett in 1955 and have 5 children together.
