= The Allen Brothers (American duo) =

- Also known as: The Chattanooga Boys
- Origin: Sewanee, Tennessee, United States
- Genres: Old time, Country
- Years active: 1920s-1930s
- Labels: Columbia, Victor, Vocalion
- Past members: Austin Allen; Lee Allen

The Allen Brothers (Austin Allen, February 7, 1901 – January 5, 1959 and Lee Allen, June 1, 1906 – February 24, 1981) were an American country music duo popular in the 1920s and 1930s and played more upbeat tunes than some of their blues-playing peers. They were nicknamed "The Chattanooga Boys" since many of their songs mentioned Chattanooga. They were one of the most successful bluegrass/‘hillbilly’ groups of their era, selling around a quarter million copies. The Morris Brothers reshaped their most popular song as "Salty Dog,” helping it became a bluegrass staple.

== Biography ==
The brothers were born and raised in Sewanee, Tennessee and they both learned to sing and play musical instruments, Austin played the banjo while Lee concentrated on the guitar and kazoo. As they grew up they were influenced by local jazz and blues artists such as the guitarist and Mississippi river boat performer May Bell and the street singers the Two Poor Boys. By the early 1920s, they were performing in small coal-mining communities in the South doing medicine shows and Vaudeville onstage. They made a lot of their songs about what was happening in the news, such as in “Jake Walk Blues,” or “Price of Cotton Blues." They also supported F.D.R.’s New Deal in the “New Deal Blues" and wrote "I've Got the Chain Store Blues” inspired by a populist campaign for independent shops by W.K. Henderson. Other songs of their that did well were lighthearted, funny and even suggestive.

They received a recording contract on Columbia Records and recorded for the first time on April 7, 1927. At this first session they recorded "Salty Dog Blues" which became their first hit selling around 18,000 copies. "Bow Wow Blues" was another notable recording of that time, as it was later placed by music historians in the dirty blues category. Columbia, by mistake, placed one of their recordings in the "race" series (reserved for black artists) instead of its "hillbilly" series. The brothers threatened to bring a lawsuit against Columbia but in the end they decided to move to Victor Records instead. Working with the A&R man Ralph Peer - who had been instrumental in bringing both Jimmie Rodgers and the Carter Family to fame - the Allen Brothers recorded their biggest hit "A New Salty Dog" in 1930. Due to the Great Depression, the brothers had to abandon their musical career in 1934. Although they were successful and sold more than other hillbilly groups - more than 250,000 copies altogether - they could not keep making a living from their music.

Austin moved to New York and both brothers went to work in the construction business. In the 1960s, when the Allen Brothers were rediscovered by folk revivalists, Austin had already died in South Carolina in 1959 but Lee appeared onstage a few times in Tennessee.

== Discography ==
Matrix	Title	Record #	Recording date
143927	"Free a Little Bird"	Unissued	April 7, 1927
143928	"Wedding Bells*	Unissued	April 7, 1927
143929	"Salty Dog Blues*	Columbia 15175-D	April 7, 1927
143930	"Bow Wow Blues"	Columbia 15175-D	April 7, 1927
145112	"Chattanooga Blues"	Columbia 14266-D	November 4, 1927
145113	"Coal Mine Blues"	Unissued	November 4, 1927
145114	"Beaver Cap"	Unissued	November 4, 1927
145115	"Laughin' and Cryin' Blues"	Columbia 14266-D	November 4, 1927
146150	"Ain't That Skippin' and Flyin'	Columbia 15270-D	April 20, 1928
146151	"Cheat 'Em*	Columbia 15270-D	April 20, 1928
146152	"Monkey Blues""	Unissued	April 20, 1928
146153	"Ain't That a Shame*	Unissued	April 20, 1928
47167	"Frisco Blues"	Victor 40003, Bluebird B-5224	October 15, 1928
47168	"Tiple Blues"	Victor 40003, Bluebird 5104	October 15, 1928
47169	"Free a Little Bird"	Victor 40266, Bluebird B-5668	October 15, 1928
47170	"Skipping and Flying"	Victor 40266, Bluebird B-5772	October 15, 1928
47171	"I'm A Diamond from the Rough"	Unissued	October 15, 1928
47172	"Meet Your Mother in the Skies"	Unissued	October 15, 1928
47173	"Prisoner's Dream"	Victor 40210	October 15, 1928
47174	"I'll Be All Smiles Tonight"	Victor 40210	October 15, 1928
62589	"I've Got the Chain Store Blues"	Victor 40276	June 5, 1930
62590	"Jake Walk Blues"	Victor 40303k, Bluebird B-5001	June 5, 1930
62591	"The Enforcement Blues"	Victor 40276	June 5, 1930
62592	"Reckless Night Blues"	Victor 40303, Bluebird B-5224	June 5, 1930
62593	"New Chattanooga Blues"	Victor 40326, Bluebird B-5380	June 5, 1930
62594	"Shanghai Rooster Blues"	Victor 40326, Bluebird B-5668	June 5, 1930
62991	"Price of Cotton Blues"	Victor 23507	November 22, 1930
62992	"I'm Always Whistling the Blues"	Victor 23507, Bluebird B-5104	November 22, 1930
62993	"Roll Down the Line"	Victor 23551, Bluebird B-5700	November 22, 1930
62994	"Old Black Crow in the Hickory Nut Tree"	Victor 23551, Bluebird B-5448	November 22, 1930
62995	"No Low Down Hanging Around"	Victor 23536, Bluebird B-5448	November 22, 1930
62996	"Maybe Next Week Sometime"	Victor 23536, Bluebird B-5165	November 22, 1930
62997	"A New Salty Dog"	Victor 23514, Bluebird B-5403	November 22, 1930
62998	"Preacher Blues"	Victor 23514, Bluebird B-5820	November 22, 1930
69319	"When You Leave, You'll Leave Me Sad"	Victor 23567, Bluebird B-5702	May 20, 1931
69320	"Chattanooga Mama"	Victor 23567, Bluebird B-5470	May 20, 1931
69321	"It's Too Bad for You"	Victor 23631, Bluebird B-5872	May 20, 1931
69322	"Slide Daddy, Slide"	Victor 23590, Bluebird B-5317	May 20, 1931
69325	"Moonshine Bill"	Victor 23631	May 20, 1931
69326	"Pile Drivin' Papa"	Victor 23578, Bluebird B-5772	May 20, 1931
69327	"Shake It, Ida, Shake It"	Victor 23607, Bluebird B-5165	May 21, 1931
69328	"Roll It Down"	Victor 23590, Bluebird B-5317	May 21, 1931
69329	"Mother-In-Law Blues"	Victor 23607, Bluebird B-5380	May 21, 1931
69330	"Unlucky Man"	Victor 23623	May 21, 1931
69331	"Laughin' and Cryin'"	Victor 23623, Bluebird B-5533	May 21, 1931
69332	"Monkey Blues"	Victor 23578, Bluebird B-5820	May 21, 1931
61386	"Glorious Night Blues"	Victor 23707, Bluebird B-5701	February 17, 1932
61387	"Misbehavin' Mama"	Unissued	February 17, 1932
61388	"Inspiration"	Victor 23678	February 17, 1932
61389	"Crossfiring Blues"	Victor 23692, Bluebird B-5872	February 18, 1932
61390	"I'll Be Here a Long, Long Time"	Victor 23662, Bluebird B-5702	February 18, 1932
61395	"It Can't Be Done"	Victor 23662, Bluebird B-5533	February 18, 1932
61396	"Windowshade Blues"	Victor 23692, Bluebird B-5701	February 19, 1932
61397	"Maybe Next Week Sometime"	Victor 23678, Bluebird B-5700	February 19, 1932
61398	"Free-Wheeling Blues"	Unissued	February 19, 1932
74805	"Fruit Jar Blues"	Victor 23756, Bluebird B-5001	December 5, 1932
74806	"Lightning Bug Blues"	Victor 23805	December 5, 1932
74807	"Warm Knees Blues"	Victor 23805	December 5, 1932
74808	"My Midnight Man"	Unissued	December 5, 1932
74809	"Red Hot Rambling Dan"	Victor 23786	December 5, 1932
74810	"Won't You Come Home?"	Unissued	December 5, 1932
74811	"When a Man's Got a Woman"	Victor 23773	December 6, 1932
74812	"Rough Neck Blues"	Victor 23756	December 6, 1932
74813	"Slipping Clutch Blues"	Victor 23773	December 6, 1932
74814	"Here I Am	Unissued	December 6, 1932
74815	"Please Pay in Advance"	Victor 23786	December 6, 1932
74816	"Allen's Lying Blues"	Victor 23817	December 6, 1932
74817	"So Straight, My Lad	Unissued	December 6, 1932
74818	"Midnight Mama"	Victor 23817	December 6, 1932
16095	"Baby When You Coming Back Home"	Vocalion 02853	October 3, 1934
16096	"Long Gone from Bowling Green"	Vocalion 02817	October 3, 1934
16097	"Red Pajama Sal"	Vocalion 02817	October 3, 1934
16098	"New Deal Blues"	Vocalion 02890	October 3, 1934
16107	"Mercy Mercy Blues"	Vocalion 02874	October 5, 1934
16108	"Padlock Key Blues"	Unissued	October 5, 1934
16109	"Daddy Park Your Car"	Vocalion 02853	October 5, 1934
16110	"Salty Dog, Hey Hey Hey"	Vocalion 02818	October 5, 1934
16111	"Hey Buddy, Won't You Roll Down the Line"	Vocalion 02818	October 5, 1934
16112	"Allen Brothers Rag"	Vocalion 02939	October 5, 1934
16046	"Skippin' and Flyin'"	Vocalion 02939	October 6, 1934
16047	"Tipple Blues"	Vocalion 02891	October 6, 1934
16048	"Mary's Breakdown"	Vocalion 02891	October 8, 1934
16049	"Can I Get You Now"	Vocalion 02890	October 8, 1934
16050	"The Prisoner's Dream"	Vocalion 02874	October 8, 1934
16121	"Drunk and Nutty Blues"	Unissued	October 8, 1934
16122	"Misbehavin' Mama"	Vocalion 02841	October 8, 1934
16123	"Midnight Mama"	Vocalion 02841	October 8, 1934
16124	"I'm in Here a Long Long Time"	Unissued	October 8, 1934
16125	"Chattanooga Mama"	Unissued	October 8, 1934

== See also ==
- Fleming and Townsend
