= Friedrich Silcher =

German composer (1789–1860)

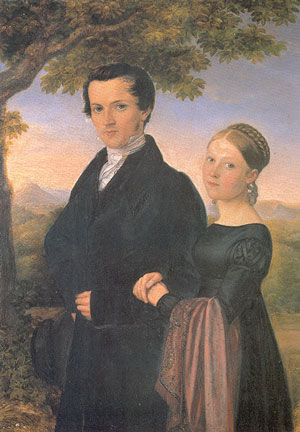
- Portrait of Silcher and his bride Louise
- Born: 27 June 1789; Schnait
- Died: 26 August 1860 (aged 71); Tübingen
- Occupations: Composer; Volkslied collector

Philipp Friedrich Silcher (27 June 1789 in Schnait (today part of Weinstadt) – 26 August 1860 in Tübingen), was a German composer, mainly known for his lieder (songs), and an important Volkslied collector.

== Life ==
Silcher was meant to be a school teacher, but dedicated himself entirely to music in the seminary in Ludwigsburg after he met Carl Maria von Weber. He was taught composition and piano by Conradin Kreutzer and Johann Nepomuk Hummel. In 1817 he was named musical director at the University of Tübingen. He is regarded as one of the most important protagonists of choir singing. He arranged many German Volkslieder and international folk songs that have remained standard repertoire of many choirs in Germany and became an integral part of German daily life. In 1829 Silcher founded the "Akademische Liedertafel" in Tübingen and directed it until his death.

Silcher was married to Luise Rosine Ensslin (1804–1871). They had two daughters and one son.

A wine varietal was named after him, the Silcher (not to be confused with Schilcher). The asteroid 10055 Silcher also bears the composer's name.

== Works ==
Amongst his best-known songs are:

- "Ich hatt' einen Kameraden"
- "Alle Jahre wieder"
- "Am Brunnen vor dem Tore" (also set by Schubert, but popular in Silcher's version)
- "Die Lorelei"
- Abschied ("Muss i' denn zum Städtele hinaus"), which "inspired" the English-language "Wooden Heart" made famous by Elvis Presley when he was stationed in West Germany during his military service.
- Melody of "So nimm denn meine Hände", originally for a different song
- Ännchen von Tharau
