= Lyrical subject =

Real or imagined narrator of a lyrical work

The lyrical subject, lyrical speaker or lyrical I is the voice or person in charge of narrating the words of a poem or other lyrical work. The lyrical subject is a conventional literary figure, historically associated with the author, although it is not necessarily the author who speaks for themselves in the subject.

The lyrical subject may be an anonymous, non-personal, or stand-alone entity; the author as a subject; the author's persona or some other character appearing and participating within the story of a poem (an example would be the lyrical speaker of The Raven by Edgar Allan Poe - a lonely man who misses his lost love Leonor, not Edgar Allan Poe), whether fictitious or factual. Therefore, the lyrical subject is the character to which the author intends to give life in their text. Although sometimes the author can refer to themself, they will always do so in the form of a speaker and not directly. The subject functions as a revealing agent of experiences and the emotions of the poem.
