= Allen Brothers =

- Company type: Public
- Industry: Retail
- Founded: 1893; 133 years ago
- Headquarters: Chicago, Illinois
- Products: Steak, USDA Prime beef, Seafood
- Parent: Chefs' Warehouse Inc.
- Website: www.allenbrothers.com

Allen Brothers is a purveyor of prime steaks headquartered in Chicago. Founded in 1893 on the Southside of Chicago in the Union Stock Yards meat area, It is led by Christopher Pappas, CEO and founder of The Chefs' Warehouse, who is on a mission to preserve the integrity of the brand and steward the business for the next 120 years. Allen Brothers began as a wholesale business selling to steakhouses in the US. Since 1993 it has also been selling its restaurant-grade steaks directly to consumers through its website and catalog.

The company's slogan is "The Great Steakhouse Steaks". The wholesale clients include The Forge in Miami Beach, Florida, Delmonico's Steak House Hilton in Philadelphia, Pennsylvania, Gene & Georgetti in Chicago, Illinois, Chops Lobster Bar in Boca Raton, FL, Lawry's The Prime Rib in Chicago, Cole's Chop House Napa, The Prime Rib in Washington, DC and Baltimore and Abacus Restaurant in Dallas, Texas. The Wall Street Journal praised Allen Brothers steaks, stating that it offers "steakhouse-quality cuts" to consumers. The Chicago Tribune's Corilyn Shropshire wrote that Allen Brothers was "among the last family-owned premium meat businesses in the country".

In 2012, chairman Bobby Hatoff was inducted as one of the twelve members in the meat industry Hall of Fame's 2012 class. In the 1980s, Hatoff started his tenure as Allen Brothers' leader. His tenure included the industry's "prosperous and lean years". The high-protein diet movement during the early 2000s was very profitable, whereas during the Great Recession, fine dining was more suited for high living. He was known in the business for his "old-world style of doing business". Rather than paying attention only to transactions, he also focused on the relationships by not forgetting business associates' spouses' or children's names. Harry Caray's Restaurant Group CEO Grant DePorter told the Chicago Tribune that each year Hatoff sent him flowers for his wedding anniversary. Hatoff died on October 7, 2012.
