= Orthophonic Joy =

Orthophonic Joy: The 1927 Bristol Sessions Revisited
- Double-CD album includes booklet of liner notes with photos and descriptions. Designed by Status Serigraph, Knoxville, Tennessee.

Studio album by Various Artists
- Released: May 12, 2015
- Recorded: Nashville, 2013-2015
- Genre: Country, Bluegrass, Folk
- Length: 2:02:18
- Label: Sony Legacy Recordings
- Producer: Carl Jackson

Orthophonic Joy: The 1927 Bristol Sessions Revisited is a double-CD produced by Grammy Award-winner Carl Jackson, a Bluegrass and country music artist, as a benefit for the Birthplace of Country Music Museum in Bristol, Tennessee. The project was conceived by executive producer Rusty Morrell, a Bristol native who was well acquainted with the story of the historic 1927 Bristol Sessions and imagined a modern tribute to the sessions that have been dubbed the "big bang" of country music. The project includes 37 tracks - 18 songs and 19 spoken word tracks that provide context. WSM disc jockey and country music historian Eddie Stubbs narrates the project, and a who's who of country artists recorded the new versions of the old classics. Jackson recorded the album between 2013 and 2015. It was released by Sony Legacy Recordings on May 12, 2015.

The purpose of the 1927 sessions was to record new talent for a public that was buying the new Orthophonic Victrola in record numbers. It launched the recording careers of Jimmie Rodgers and The Carter Family. Ernest Stoneman, already a popular recording artist, convinced Victor executive Ralph Peer to set up a temporary recording studio in Bristol. In a similar vein, the producers sponsored a talent contest for the Orthophonic Joy project. Corbin Hayslett, a 20-year-old banjo player, won the competition with his rendition of "Darling Cora," which he ultimately recorded for the project.

== Track listing ==
=== Disc One ===
1. "Don't Deny Yourself The Sheer Joy Of Orthophonic Music" (Narrative: Cindy Lovell; Background score: "I'm Redeemed" performed by The Alcoa Quartet) Eddie Stubbs – 4:22
2. "I'm Redeemed" (Traditional arrangement by Doyle Lawson) Doyle Lawson and Quicksilver – 4:06
3. "All They Needed Now Was Talent" (Narrative: Cindy Lovell; Background score: "Bury Me Beneath the Willow" performed by The Carter Family) Eddie Stubbs – 3:29
4. "Bury Me Beneath The Willow'" (Traditional arrangement by Carl Jackson) Emmylou Harris – 3:18
5. "Tonight He Is Playing The Old, Old Tune At Police Headquarters" (Narrative: Cindy Lovell; Background score: "Black-Eyed Susie" performed by J.P. Nester & Norman Edmonds) Eddie Stubbs – 2:57
6. "Black-Eyed Susie" (Traditional arrangement by Carl Jackson) Marty Stuart – 2:36
7. "An Early Tradition of Scrapping For Rights And Royalties" (Narrative: Cindy Lovell; Background score: "When They Ring Those Golden Bells" performed by Alfred G. Karnes) Eddie Stubbs – 2:12
8. "When They Ring Those Golden Bells" (Dion De Marbelle) (Traditional arrangement by Carl Jackson) Dolly Parton – 5:09
9. "I Wish I Had Some Rocks To Throw At Them" (Narrative: Cindy Lovell; Background score: "The Storms Are On The Ocean" performed by The Carter Family) Eddie Stubbs – 3:52
10. "The Storms Are On The Ocean" (Traditional arrangement by Carl Jackson) Ashley Monroe – 3:48
11. "Any Song With A Story Will Go To The People's Hearts" (Narrative: Cindy Lovell; Background score: "I Am Resolved" performed by Ernest V. Stoneman & His Dixie Mountaineers) Eddie Stubbs – 4:11
12. "I Am Resolved" (Traditional arrangement by Carl Jackson) The Shotgun Rubies – 3:38
13. "A Hoedown Social In A Mountain Cabin" (Narrative: Cindy Lovell; Background score: "Sweet Heaven When I Die" performed by The Tenneva Ramblers) Eddie Stubbs – 3:08
14. "Sweet Heaven When I Die" (Traditional arrangement by Carl Jackson, Steve Martin, and The Steep Canyon Rangers) Steve Martin & The Steep Canyon Rangers – 3:28
15. "Daddy Never Knew When He Would Come Up With An Idea For A Song" (Narrative: Cindy Lovell; Background score: "The Soldier's Sweetheart" performed by Jimmie Rodgers) Eddie Stubbs – 3:21
16. "The Soldier's Sweetheart" (Jimmie Rodgers) Vince Gill – 3:30
17. "Where The Blues Meets The Church" (Narrative: Cindy Lovell; Background score: "To The Work" performed by Alfred G. Karnes) Eddie Stubbs – 2:12
18. "To The Work" (Fannie J. Crosby & William H. Doane) Keb' Mo' – 3:23

=== Disc Two ===
1. "Singers Who Had Not Visited Bristol During Their Entire Lifetime Arrived" (Narrative: Cindy Lovell; Background score: "Where We'll Never Grow Old" performed by Alfred G. Karnes) Eddie Stubbs – 2:13
2. "Where We'll Never Grow Old" (James C. Moore) The Church Sisters – 4:56
3. "Love, Loss, And The Perils Of The Moonshine Business" (Narrative: Cindy Lovell; Background score: "Darling Cora" performed by B.F. Shelton) Eddie Stubbs – 2:28
4. "Darling Cora" – (Traditional arrangement by Corbin Hayslett) Corbin Hayslett – 3:43
5. "Ramblers Riding The Longest Train I Ever Saw" (Narrative: Cindy Lovell; Background score: "The Longest Train I Ever Saw" performed by the Tenneva Ramblers) Eddie Stubbs – 1:59
6. "In The Pines" (Traditional arrangement by Carl Jackson) Brad Paisley & Carl Jackson – 3:55
7. "Twenty-One Good Years At The Throttle" (Narrative: Cindy Lovell; Background score: "The Wreck Of The Virginian" performed by Blind Alfred Reed) Eddie Stubbs – 3:06
8. "The Wreck Of The Virginian" (Alfred Reed) Ashley Campbell & Shannon Campbell – 4:21
9. "Prized And Practical, Brutal Ballads" (Narrative: Cindy Lovell; Background score: "Pretty Polly" performed by B.F. Shelton) Eddie Stubbs – 2:07
10. "Pretty Polly" (Traditional arrangement by Carl Jackson) Carl Jackson – 5:49
11. "Tremendous Heart Punch And Appeal" (Narrative: Cindy Lovell; Background score: "The Wandering Boy" performed by The Carter Family) Eddie Stubbs 3:29
12. "The Wandering Boy" (Traditional arrangement by Carl Jackson) Sheryl Crow with Vince Gill – 4:22
13. "Gotta Catch That Train" (Narrative: Cindy Lovell; Background score: "Train On The Island" performed by J.P. Nester & Norman Edmonds) Eddie Stubbs – 1:51
14. "Train On The Island" (Traditional arrangement by Carl Jackson & Larry Cordle) Larry Cordle & The Virginia Luthiers – 2:21
15. "History Saws And Strums Along With Itself" (Narrative: Cindy Lovell; Background score: "Johnny Goodwin" performed by the Bull Mountain Moonshiners) Eddie Stubbs – 2:15
16. "Johnny Goodwin/The Girl I Left Behind" (Traditional arrangement by Jesse McReynolds & Carl Jackson) Jesse McReynolds & Carl Jackson – 2:32
17. "Introducing The Orthophonic Choir" (Narrative: Cindy Lovell; Background score: "At The River" performed by the Tennessee Mountaineers) 2:05
18. "Shall We Gather At The River" (Traditional arrangement by Carl Jackson) The Chuck Wagon Gang & The Orthophonic Choir – 3:22
19. "The Birthplace Of Country Music" (Narrative: Cindy Lovell; Background score: "I'm Redeemed" performed by the Alcoa Quartet, "At The River" performed by Tennessee Mountaineers, and "Shall We Gather AT The River" (Refrain) performed by The Chuck Wagon Gang & The Orthophonic Choir) Eddie Stubbs 2:44

== Personnel ==
- Carl Jackson: Acoustic Guitar, Banjo, Gut String Guitar, Lead Vocal, Baritone Vocal,
- Eddie Stubbs: Spoken Word Narration
- Doyle Lawson: Lead Vocal
- Eli Johnston: Tenor Vocal
- Dustin Pyrtle: Baritone Vocal
- Josh Swift: Bass Vocal
- Emmylou Harris: Lead Vocal
- Carl Jackson: Acoustic Guitar, Mother Maybelle's Stromberg Guitar, Banjo, Lead Vocal, Harmony Vocals
- Tony Creasman: Drums
- Kevin Grantt: Bass
- Catherine Marx: Piano
- Aubrey Haynie: Fiddle, Twin Fiddle, Low Fiddle
- Adam Steffey: Mandolin
- Jeremy Stephens: Autoharp
- Marty Stuart: Mandolin, Lead Vocal
- Bryan Sutton: Acoustic Guitar
- Andy Leftwich: Twin Fiddle
- Dolly Parton: Lead Vocal
- Rob Ickes: Dobro, Weissenborn
- Ashley Monroe: Lead Vocal
- Val Storey: Lead Vocal, Harmony Vocals
- Delnora Reed: Lead Vocal, Tenor Vocals
- Dani Flowers: Lead Vocal, Baritone Vocals
- Vince Gill: Lead Vocal
- Keb' Mo': Acoustic Slide Guitar, Lead Vocal
- Keb' H-Mc': Acoustic Guitar
- Savannah Church: Lead Vocal
- Sarah Church: Lead Vocal, Tenor Vocal
- Josh Pickett: Acoustic Guitar
- Spencer Strickland: Mandolin
- Corbin Hayslett: Banjo, Lead Vocal
- Dennis Crouch: Bass
- Brad Paisley: Acoustic Guitar, Lead Vocal
- Ashley Campbell: Banjo, Lead Vocal
- Shannon Campbell: Harmony Vocal
- Sheryl Crow: Lead Vocal
- Larry Cordle: Lead Vocal
- Gerald Anderson: Bass
- Wayne Henderson: Acoustic Guitar
- Jimmy Edmonds: Fiddle
- Scott Freeman: Fiddle
- Jesse McReynolds: Fiddle
- Julie Hudson: Soprano Vocal
- Shaye Smith: Alto Vocal
- Stan Hill: Tenor Vocal
- Jeremy Stephens: Acoustic Guitar, Bass Vocal
- The Orthophonic Choir: Background Vocals

== Technical personnel ==
- Carl Jackson: Producer
- Rusty Morrell: Executive Producer
- John (Hip-Hop) Caldwell: Engineer
- Drew Bollman: Engineer
- Josh Swift: Engineer
- Patrick Murphy: Engineer
- Derik Lee: Engineer
- Luke Wooten: Engineer, Mixing, Mastering
