= Clyde Davenport =

American old-time fiddler and banjo player (1921–2020)

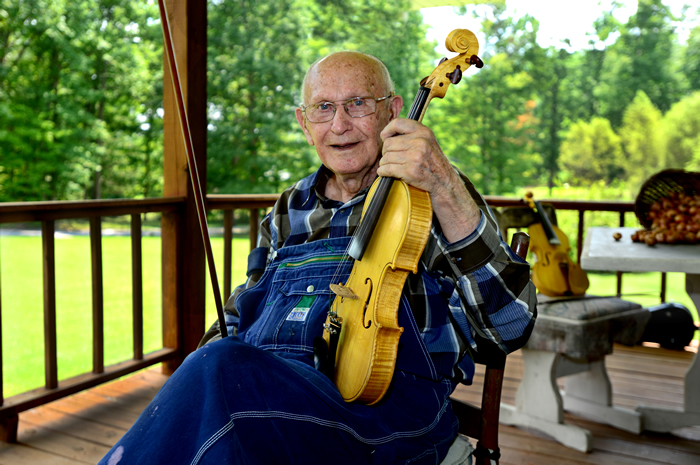
- Davenport in 1992

Background information
- Born: Clyde Thomas Davenport; October 21, 1921; Mt. Pisgah, Kentucky
- Origin: Monticello, Kentucky, U.S.
- Died: February 16, 2020 (aged 98) Monticello, Kentucky, U.S.
- Genres: Old-time
- Occupation: Instrumentalist
- Instruments: Fiddle, banjo

Clyde Thomas Davenport (October 21, 1921 – February 16, 2020) was an American old-time fiddler and banjo player from Monticello, Kentucky.

Davenport was a recipient of a 1992 National Heritage Fellowship awarded by the National Endowment for the Arts, which is the United States government's highest honor in the folk and traditional arts. He died in February 2020 at the age of 98.

== Early life ==
Davenport was born and raised on a 250-acre farm in Blue Hole Hollow, Wayne County, Kentucky, close to the Tennessee border. Music ran deep in the family going back several generations. Clyde's grandfather and father both played fiddle, as did three of his five brothers. He built his first instrument at age nine, using only the resources around him on his farm, at age eleven he built a banjo the same way. Nobody taught him to play either instrument.

In his mid-teens Davenport began playing for local square dances, and around the same time discovered the fiddle and banjo duo of Blind Dick Burnett and Leonard Rutherford, who performed regularly on the steps of the Monticello courthouse. Rutherford's smooth, long-bowing technique had a lasting effect on Davenport and eventually pulled him toward the fiddle as his main instrument.

== Later life ==
Davenport served in the U.S. Army and was a veteran of World War II. After returning home he moved to Newcastle, Indiana, where he worked in auto factories. He played fiddle on a daily radio program in nearby Muncie during this time but turned down a musical career, saying he wanted real work. He married Lorene Gregory in 1950 and the two returned to Wayne County in 1957, where they farmed and he largely stopped playing music publicly for about fifteen years. Alongside farming, Davenport built and repaired fiddles professionally throughout much of his adult life, and became known locally as someone who could make a repaired instrument sound better than it had before.

== Music ==
His return to recorded music came gradually in the mid-1970s through the work of folklorists who documented his playing. The 1986 solo album Clydeoscope on County Records was his breakthrough, presenting his fiddle playing without accompaniment and introducing his repertoire to a national audience for the first time. Ethnomusicologist Jeff Todd Titon of Brown University later featured Davenport as a central figure in Old-Time Kentucky Fiddle Tunes (University Press of Kentucky, 2001), one of the most thorough academic treatments of the tradition.

Davenport kept more than 200 fiddle tunes in memory, many of them rare pieces that existed nowhere else in recorded form. His style emphasized solo playing, long bowing, and cross-key tunings, and has been described as "lean, spare, sinewy." His home in Monticello became a destination for musicians from across the country who came specifically to learn from him directly.

== Death ==
Davenport died on February 16, 2020, at Golden Years Nursing Home in Monticello, Kentucky at the age of 98.

== Discography ==
| Year | Title | Label | Notes |
|---|---|---|---|
| c. 1975 | Monticello: Tough Mountain Music from Southern Kentucky | Davis Unlimited DU-33014 | With W. L. Gregory |
| c. 1975 | Homemade Stuff | Davis Unlimited DU-33028 | With W. L. Gregory |
| c. 1980 | Gettin' Up the Stairs | County 786 | Anthology |
| 1986 | Clydeoscope: Rare and Beautiful Tunes from the Cumberland Plateau | County 788 | Solo fiddle |
| 2006 | Clyde Davenport, Vol. 1 | Field Recorders' Collective FRC103 | |
| 2006 | Clyde Davenport, Vol. 2 | Field Recorders' Collective FRC104 | |
