= Cumberland Gap (song) =

Appalachian folk song

Song
- Recorded: June 1924 (first recording)
- Genre: Folk, country, skiffle, bluegrass
- Length: appx. 1.5 to 5 minutes, depending on version
- Songwriter(s): Traditional

"Cumberland Gap" (Roud 3413) is an Appalachian folk song that likely dates to the latter half of the 19th century and was first recorded in 1924. The song is typically played on banjo or fiddle, and well-known versions of the song include instrumental versions as well as versions with lyrics. A version of the song appeared in the 1934 book, American Ballads and Folk Songs, by folk song collector John Lomax. Woody Guthrie recorded a version of the song at his Folkways sessions in the mid-1940s, and the song saw a resurgence in popularity with the rise of bluegrass and the American folk music revival in the 1950s. In 1957, the British musician Lonnie Donegan had a No. 1 UK hit with a skiffle version of "Cumberland Gap".

The song's title refers to the Cumberland Gap, a mountain pass in the Appalachian Mountains at the juncture of the states of Tennessee, Virginia, and Kentucky. The gap was used in the latter half of the 18th century by westward-bound migrants travelling from the original 13 American colonies to the Trans-Appalachian frontier. During the U.S. Civil War (1861–1865), Union and Confederate armies engaged in a year-long back-and-forth struggle for control of the gap.

== Song history ==
=== Origins and early references ===
North Carolina songster Bascom Lamar Lunsford (1882–1973), recording his "memory collection" for the Archive of American Folk Song in March 1949, suggested that "Cumberland Gap" may be a "sped up" version of the tune that once accompanied the ballad Bonnie George Campbell. Lunsford recorded both songs on fiddle to show the similarities (although many folk tunes from the British Isles are very similar).

One of the earliest references to "Cumberland Gap" (the song) was published by author Horace Kephart (1862–1931) in his 1913 book, Our Southern Highlanders. Kephart recalled taking part in a bear hunt that took place circa 1904–1906 in the Great Smoky Mountains. While waiting for weather conditions to improve, members of the hunting party sang "ballets" to pass the time. Kephart transcribed the opening stanzas to several of these songs, including a version of "Cumberland Gap" sung by Hazel Creek bear hunter "Little John" Cable:

"L-a-a-ay down boys,
Le's take a nap:
Thar's goin' to be trouble
In the Cumberland Gap"

Kephart simply wrote that the song was of "modern and local origin." Kentucky ballad collector H. H. Fuson published a lengthy version of "Cumberland Gap" in 1931, with the first three lines in the opening stanza reading "Lay down, boys, an' take a little nap" and the last line reading "They're all raisin' Hell in the Cumberland Gap," somewhat echoing the lyrics transcribed by Kephart a quarter-century earlier. Fuson's version also mentions key historical events in the Cumberland Gap's pioneer period and the battle for control of the gap during the Civil War. His last stanza ends with the line "Fourteen miles to the Cumberland Gap." This last line would appear again in a 1933 field recording of the song by an obscure Harlan, Kentucky fiddler known as "Blind" James Howard, and published by John Lomax (who conducted the recording) in his 1934 book, American Ballads and Folk Songs.

=== Early recordings and performances ===
The earliest known recording of "Cumberland Gap" was a 1924 instrumental version by Tennessee fiddler Ambrose G. "Uncle Am" Stuart (1853–1926). The first singing and solo banjo version was recorded by Land Norris in August, 1924 by Okeh Records. Then, in September 1924, fiddle-and-guitar duo Gid Tanner and Riley Puckett recorded the song, and would re-record the song again in 1926 with their band, the Skillet Lickers. Tanner's lyrics bear little resemblance to Fuson's, although Tanner's chorus uses the line "Me and my wife and my wife's pap," which resembles a line in one of Fuson's stanzas.

In the mid-1940s, Woody Guthrie recorded a version of "Cumberland Gap" for Moe Asch's Folkways label, containing the chorus, "Cumberland Gap, Cumberland Gap/Seventeen miles to the Cumberland Gap" and a stanza referring to the gap's distance from Middlesboro, Kentucky. Folk musician and folk music scholar Pete Seeger released a version somewhat similar to Guthrie's in 1954. Donegan's 1957 skiffle version, which reached No. 1 on the charts in the United Kingdom, also resembled Guthrie's Folkways version, although his chorus uses "fifteen miles" rather than "seventeen miles."

In May 1925, at the Fiddlers' Convention in Mountain City, Tennessee, fiddler G. B. Grayson won first prize (although accounts vary) with his rendering of "Cumberland Gap", ousting rivals Stuart, Charlie Bowman, and Fiddlin' John Carson. Bluegrass banjoist Earl Scruggs delivered a memorable performance of "Cumberland Gap" at the Newport Folk Festival in 1959. The song has since been recorded and performed by dozens of bluegrass, country, and folk musicians, including the 2nd South Carolina String Band's rendition of the Civil War lyrics.

== Notable versions ==
Pre-war commercial recording details are from Rusell (2004)

Artist	Year	Issue	Genre	Notes
Uncle Am Stuart	July 1924	Vocalion Vo 14839	Old-time fiddle	Instrumental
Land Norris	August 1924	OKeh 40212	Old-time	Solo vocal and solo banjo
Gid Tanner and Riley Puckett	September 1924	Columbia Co 245-D	Old-time fiddle and banjo	
Gid Tanner and The Skillet Lickers	1928,	Columbia Co 15303-D	Old-time with vocal	Riley Puckett plays guitar
The Hill Billies	1926	Vocation Vo 5024	Old-time	
Dick Burnett, Leonard Rutherford & Byrd Moore	1928	Gennett Ge 6706	Old-time banjo, fiddle, guitar	
Frank Hutchison	1929	OKeh OK44570	Old-time guitar with vocal	
Blind James Howard	1933	Library of Congress	Old-time fiddle	Recorded for LOC by John Lomax
Gid Tanner and The Skillet Lickers	1934	Bluebird BB B-5434	Old-time fiddle, guitar, mandolin	As "Cumberland Gap on a Bucking Mule"
Luther Strong	1937	Library of Congress	Old-time fiddle	Recorded for LOC by Alan Lomax
Woody Guthrie	1944–1945	Folkways	Folk	
Bascom Lamar Lunsford	1949	Library of Congress	Old-time fiddle	Plays "Bonnie George Campbell" and "Cumberland Gap"
Pete Seeger	1954	Folkways	Folk	
Don Reno and Red Smiley	1956	King	Bluegrass	
Lonnie Donegan	1957	Pye	Skiffle	UK no. 1 (five weeks), April–May.
The Vipers Skiffle Group	1957	Parlophone	Skiffle	UK no. 10 hit in April.
Dickie Bishop and his Sidekicks	1957	London Records	Skiffle	
Wade Ward	1959	Atlantic Records	Old-time banjo	Recorded by Alan Lomax and Shirley Collins
"New River" Jack Burchett	1961	Smithsonian Folkways	Old-time banjo with vocal	Released 1994
Lester Flatt and Earl Scruggs	1961	Columbia	Bluegrass	
Byard Ray & Obray Ramsey	1961	Polydor	Old-time banjo and fiddle	LP White Lightnin'
Dock Boggs	1963	Folkways	Old-time banjo	
Hobart Smith	1963	Folkways	Old-time banjo	Fleming Brown sessions; virtuosic banjo instrumental
P.J. Proby with The Vernons Girls	1964	N/A	Pop-Rock	Performed during the internationally broadcast TV special Around The Beatles
Fred Cockerman	1967	County Records	Old-time banjo	
Cuje Bertram	1970	Home recording	African American fiddle	Released 1999 by Document Records
Esker Hutchins	1971	County Records	Old-time banjo	
Kyle Creed	1977	Heritage	Old-time banjo	Album: Liberty
Senator Robert Byrd	1978	County 967	Old-time fiddle with vocal	LP U.S. Senator Robert Byrd – Mountain Fiddler. Accompanied by band
Chancey Brothers	1979	Dust-to-Digital	Old-time banjo with guitar	
The Wedding Present	1992	New Musical Express	Indie Rock	Ruby Trax
Old Crow Medicine Show	2001	Blood Donor Music	Old-time	Greetings from Wawa
Frank Fairfield	2009	Tompkins Square	Old-time	
Xiu Xiu	2010	Kill Rock Stars	Indie Rock	Appears on Dear God, I Hate Myself (2010)
Felice Brothers	2012	Alt Folk	Home Recordings	
Rising Appalachia	2012 & 2017	Independent	Alt Folk	The studio version appears on Filthy Dirty South (2012); a live version appears on Alive (2017)
Cameron Knowler & Eli Winter	2021	American Dreams Records	Instrumental guitar	Appears as "Cumberland Application"

== Music ==
"Cumberland Gap" is most commonly played on fiddle, guitar or banjo. The banjo tuning, f#BEAD, used by Dock Boggs, Hobart Smith, and Kyle Creed, is sometimes called the "Cumberland Gap tuning". It allows banjo players to play the tune in D, the same as a fiddler would, by extending the bass range of the instrument.

== Other ==
=== David Rawlings ===
David Rawlings, together with his musical partner Gillian Welch, wrote and recorded a song with the same name and inspired by the traditional, for his 2017 album Poor David's Almanack. It was also used in the 2019 film The Gentlemen.

=== Jason Isbell ===
Jason Isbell and the 400 Unit recorded a song with the same name for their 2017 album The Nashville Sound.

== See also ==
- List of UK Singles Chart number ones of the 1950s
