= Ernest Phipps =

American musician (1900–1963)

Ernest Phipps (May 4, 1900 – April 17, 1963) was an American Old-time country musician and Southern gospel singer, best known for his recordings at the Bristol Sessions in 1927.

== Biography ==
Ernest Phipps was a singing preacher from Corbin, Kentucky who had also worked as a coal miner. From a Pentecostal Holiness Church, he had a singing group called The Holiness Quartet as well as a larger group called The Holiness Singers which included a stringband of various members. He took this larger group down to Bristol, Tennessee in response to advertisements put out by Ralph Peer looking for local artists to record on Victor Records. He recorded six sides in 1927 and six more in 1928. All were religious in subject matter. Although his records were all released by Victor he did not record again and returned to Corbin where he continued to preach for the rest of his life.

== Musical style ==
The Pentecostal Holiness musical style encouraged a rousing, emotional approach with group singing and a call and response led by a leader. The material was based on traditional hymns which allowed a large number of singers to quickly learn the songs. Phipps led the quartet with a clear voice and a broad mountain accent which can be heard in his pronouncing of words like "where" and "there" as "whaar" and "thaar". The members of the singing quartet are unknown but they included at least one female voice which takes the lead on one song "A Little Talk With Jesus".

Phipps' backing band was a stringband which included fiddle, guitar, banjo, mandolin, auto-harp and sometimes piano. The exact identity of Phipps backing band and singers are unknown although it is believed that at Bristol they included Alfred Karnes and B.F. Shelton who had also come down to Bristol from Corbin to record. Karnes was a fellow singing preacher, albeit from a different denomination as he was a Baptist, and should have been familiar with the songs which were at any rate simple enough in form being basic repeating riffs at mid-tempo.

Noted songs recorded by Phipps included "Old Ship Of Zion", "I Want to Go Where Jesus Is" and "If The Light Has Gone Out Of Your Soul" which sold well enough to stay in print into the 1930s. "Shine On Me" had already been recorded by The Wiseman Quartet in 1923 and would later be recorded by Bryant's Jubilee Quartet (1920s), Fisk Jubilee Singers (1930s), Blind Willie Johnson (1929), Lead Belly (1947), Cliff Carlisle Quintet (1930s), The Swan Silvertones (1950s), Kings of Harmony (1950s), The Soul Stirrers (1950s) and Reverend Gary Davis (1954).
