= Bristol sessions =

1927 gathering and recording of country music stars

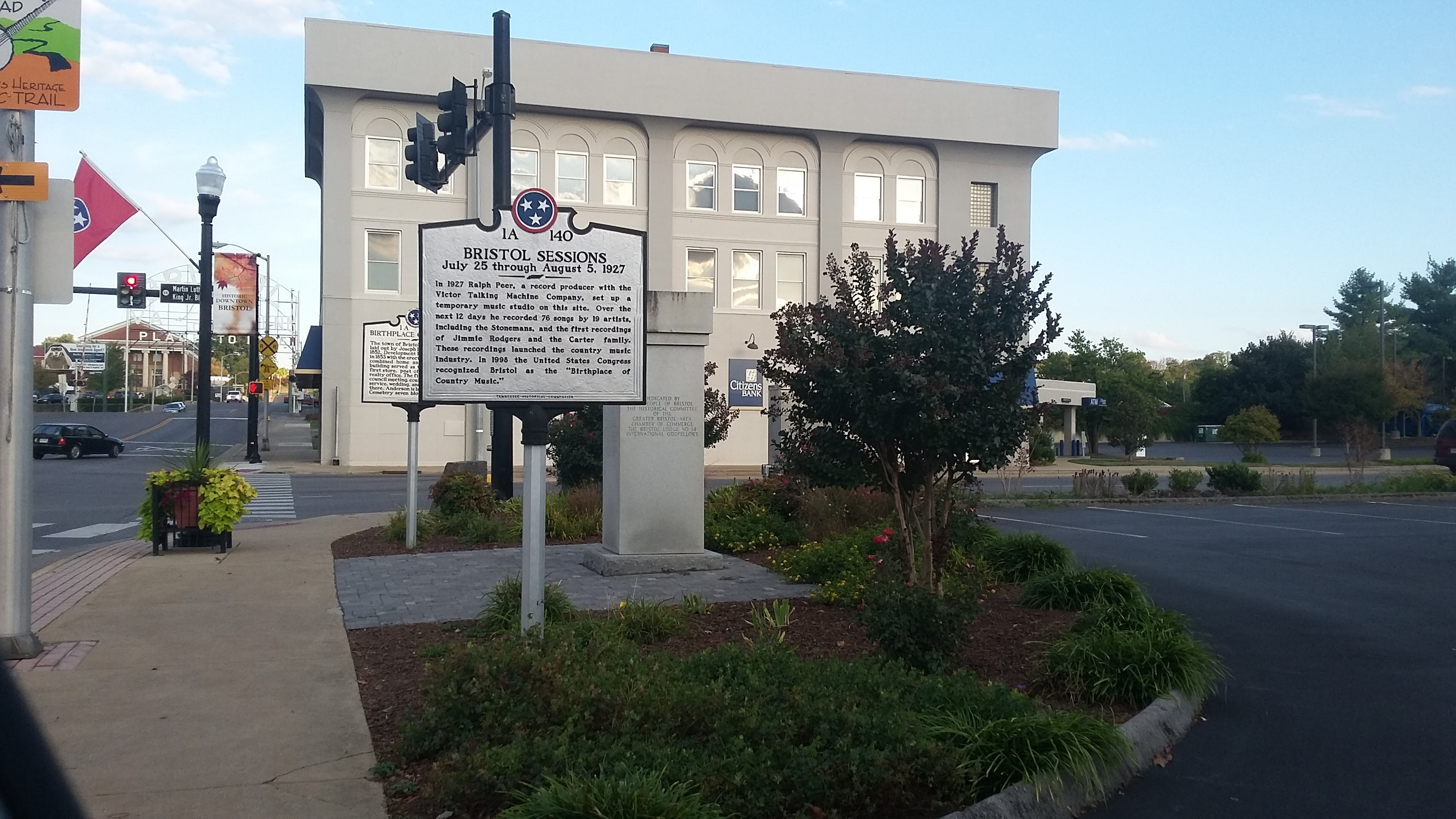
Site of Bristol Sessions Recordings in Bristol, Tennessee, now a parking lot on the site of the former warehouse where the recordings took place. It is located near the large Bristol, TN/VA sign, and not far from the Birthplace of Country Music Museum

The Bristol Sessions were a series of recording sessions held in 1927 in Bristol, Tennessee, considered by some as the "Big Bang" of modern country music. The recordings were made by Victor Talking Machine Company producer Ralph Peer. Bristol was one of the stops on a two-month, $60,000 trip that took Peer through several major southern cities and yielded important recordings of blues, ragtime, gospel, ballads, topical songs, and string bands. The Bristol Sessions marked the commercial debuts of Jimmie Rodgers and the Carter Family. As a result of the influence of these recording sessions, Bristol has been called the "birthplace of country music". Since 2014, the town has been home to the Birthplace of Country Music Museum.

== Country music before the Sessions ==
Commercial recordings of country music had begun in 1922. Among these very early artists were Vernon Dalhart, who recorded the million-selling "Wreck of the Old 97"; Ernest Stoneman from Galax, Virginia; Henry Whitter; A.C. (Eck) Robertson, who recorded the first documented country record along with Henry C. Gilliland ("Sallie Gooden" b/w "Arkansaw Traveler"); and Uncle Dave Macon. However, any "hillbilly" artists who recorded had to travel to the New York City studios of the major labels, and many artists, including Dalhart, were not true "hillbilly" artists but instead crossed over from other genres.

Okeh Records and later Columbia Records had sent producers around the South in an attempt to discover new talent. Peer, who worked for Okeh at the time, recorded Fiddlin' John Carson using the old acoustic method (known for its large intrusive sound-gathering horn) in 1923, at the behest of the Okeh dealer in Atlanta, Georgia, Polk Brockman. Despite Peer's belief that the record was of poor quality, the 500 copies made of "The Little Old Log Cabin in the Lane" and "The Old Hen Cackled and the Rooster's Going to Crow" sold out in weeks. This experience convinced Peer of the potential for "hillbilly" music.

Peer left Okeh for the Victor Talking Machine Company, taking a salary of $1 per year. However, Peer owned the publishing rights to all the recordings he made. Peer's arrangement of paying royalties to artists based on sales is the basis for record contracts today, and the company he founded, Peermusic, remains in existence today.

The birth of electrical recording in 1925 allowed records to have a sound better than radio, which had threatened to reduce the recording industry to irrelevance in the early 1920s. This new method allowed softer instruments such as dulcimers, guitars and jaw harps to be heard, and it also meant recording equipment was somewhat more portable – and as such, recordings could be made nearly anywhere (the cumbersome acoustic equipment was not really portable.)

Peer asked Ernest Stoneman, who had recorded for Okeh, how to find more rural talent. Stoneman convinced Peer to travel through southern Appalachia and record artists who would have been unable to travel to New York. Peer recognized the potential with the mountain music, as even residents of Appalachia who did not have electricity often owned hand-cranked Victrolas, or other phonographs. He decided to make a trip, hoping to record blues, gospel and "hillbilly" music. Artists were paid $50 cash on the spot for each side cut, and 2½ cents for each single sold.

In February and March, he made a trip recording blues and gospel music, and decided to make another trip. He decided to make a stop in Savannah, Georgia and Charlotte, North Carolina. He settled on Bristol (at the urging of Stoneman) as a third stop, because with Johnson City and Kingsport, Tennessee, it formed the Tri-Cities, the largest urban area in the Appalachians at the time. In addition, three other record companies had held or were scheduling auditions for Bristol. So Peer set out with his wife and two engineers for Bristol.

== The Sessions ==
Between 25 July and 5 August 1927, Peer held recording sessions on the third floor of the Taylor-Christian Hat and Glove Company on State Street, which is the state line in Bristol. He placed advertisements in the local newspapers, which did not receive much response aside from artists who had already traveled to New York (such as the Powers Family) or were already known by Stoneman.

Stoneman was the first to record with Peer, on 25 July 1927. He recorded with his wife Hattie, Eck Dunford and Mooney Brewer. Other acts, including the Johnson Brothers vaudeville duo (best known for their Crime of The D'Autremont Brothers) and a church choir, filled out the rest of July. However, these artists were only enough to fill the first week of recordings and Peer needed to fill out his second week.

A newspaper article about one of Stoneman's recordings (Skip To Ma Lou, My Darling), which stressed the $3,600 in royalties that Stoneman had received in 1926 and the $100/day that he was receiving for recording in Bristol, generated much more interest. Dozens of artists went to Bristol, many of whom had never been to Bristol. He scheduled night sessions to accommodate the extra talent, which included Jimmie Rodgers. Rodgers had a disagreement with the band in which he was a member over what name to record under, and so Rodgers recorded solo and the band recorded as the Tenneva Ramblers. Rodgers and the band found out about the sessions only when they stayed at the boarding house run by the mother of one band member.

The arrival of the Carter Family was more expected. Ralph Peer had corresponded with the family earlier in the summer, but later wrote that "he was still surprised to see them," primarily due to their appearance. "They wander in," Peer told Lillian Borgeson during a series of interviews in 1959. "He's dressed in overalls and the women are country women from way back there. They looked like hillbillies. But as soon as I heard Sara's voice, that was it. I knew it was going to be wonderful." The Carters recorded four songs on the second Monday of the sessions and two the next day. On 1 August, Sara sang lead while playing autoharp, A.P. sang bass, and 18-year-old Maybelle played guitar with an unusual and subsequently influential style that allowed her to provide both melody and rhythm. The Victor Company released the first Carter Family record, "Poor Orphan Child" and "The Wandering Boy," on 4 November 1927.

The 1927 sessions recorded 76 songs, recorded by 19 performers or performing groups.

A second group of sessions was made by Peer in 1928, but the artistic success was not duplicated. In those twelve days in 1927 in Bristol, Tennessee, Peer had managed to fully introduce America to the authentic music of southern Appalachia. The results were two new superstars, The Carter Family and Jimmie Rodgers.

== Compilation releases ==
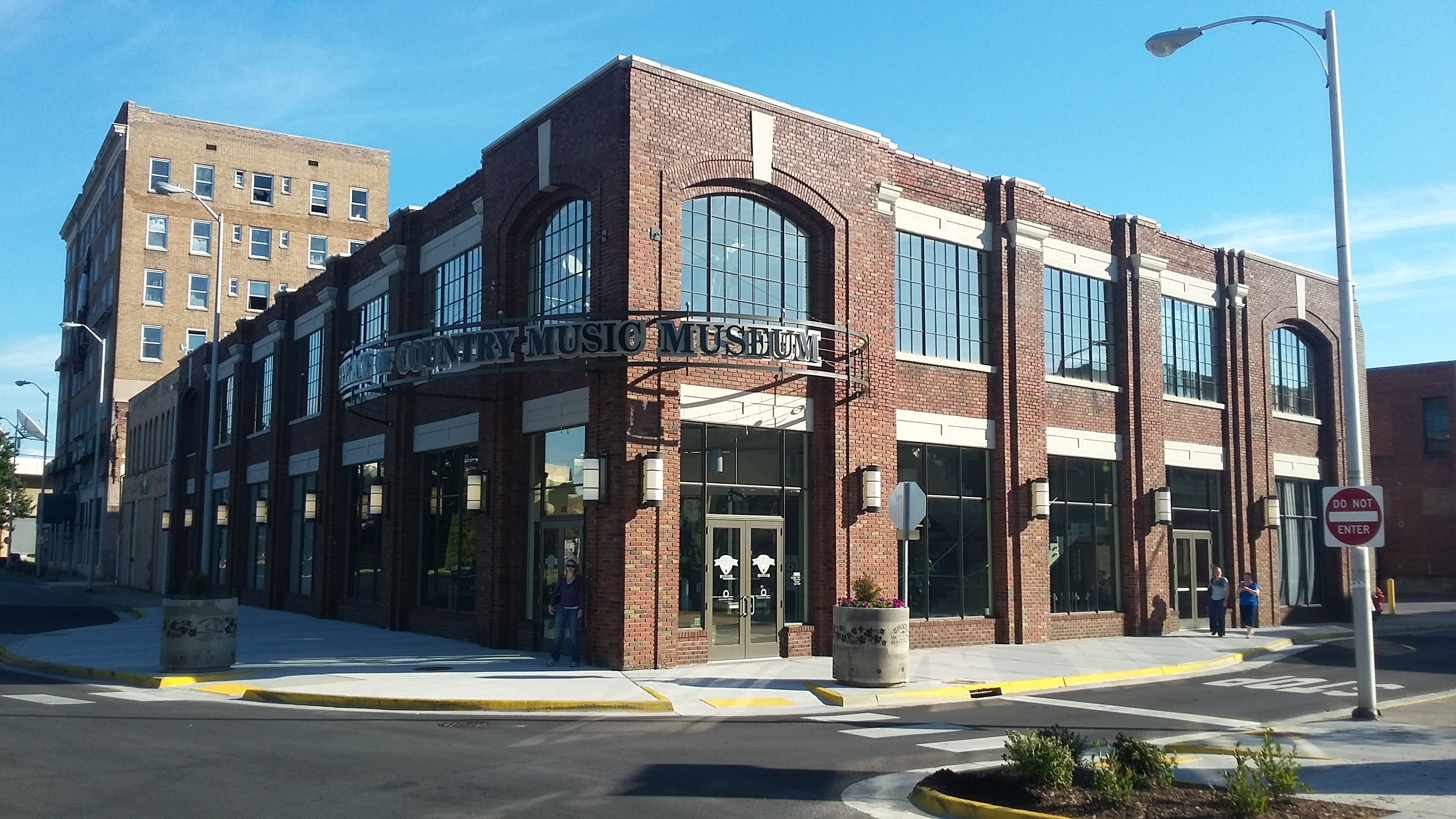
Birthplace of Country Music Museum in Bristol

In 1987, the Country Music Foundation issued a Grammy Award-nominated two-LP set, The Bristol Sessions, with 35 tracks. This was reissued on CD in 1991. In 2011, Bear Family Records issued a Grammy Award-nominated five-CD box set The Bristol Sessions: The Big Bang of Country Music 1927-1928 containing 124 tracks and a 120-page hardcover book.

In 2015, Sony Legacy Recordings released Orthophonic Joy: The 1927 Bristol Sessions Revisited as a benefit for the Birthplace of Country Music Museum. The two-CD set pays homage to the original 1927 sessions with 18 songs updated by some of country music's biggest stars, such as Dolly Parton and Brad Paisley. WSM disc jockey and country music historian Eddie Stubbs narrates 19 tracks that tell the story of the 1927 recording sessions.

== Recording details ==
Click on a label to change the sorting.

Matrix	Recording date	Artist(s)	Title	Victor No.	Release date	Key Name	Notes
39700	25 July 1927	Ernest Stoneman/M. Mooney Brewer	Dying Girl's Farewell	21129	17 February 1928	Stoneman	
39701	25 July 1927	Ernest Stoneman/M. Mooney Brewer	Tell Mother I Will Meet Her	21129	17 February 1928	Stoneman	
39702	25 July 1927	Ernest Stoneman/Eck Dunford/Miss Irma Frost	Mountaineer's Courtship	20880	4 November 1927	Stoneman	another take issued on LP & CD
39703	25 July 1927	Ernest Stoneman/Eck Dunford/Miss Irma Frost	Midnight On The Stormy Deep			Stoneman	issued on LP & CD
39704	25 July 1927	Stoneman's Dixie Mountaineers	Sweeping Through The Gates	20844	16 September 1927	Stoneman	
39705	25 July 1927	Stoneman's Dixie Mountaineers	I Know My Name Is There	21186	16 March 1928	Stoneman	
39706	25 July 1927	Stoneman's Dixie Mountaineers	Are You Washed In The Blood?	20844	16 September 1927	Stoneman	
39707	25 July 1927	Stoneman's Dixie Mountaineers	No More Goodbyes	21186	16 March 1928	Stoneman	
39708	25 July 1927	Stoneman's Dixie Mountaineers	The Resurrection	21071	20 January 1928	Stoneman	another take issued on LP & CD
39709	25 July 1927	Stoneman's Dixie Mountaineers	I Am Resolved	21071	20 January 1928	Stoneman	
39710	26 July 1927	Ernest Phipps and His Holiness Quartet	I Want to Go Where Jesus Is	20834	16 September 1927	Phipps	
39711	26 July 1927	Ernest Phipps and His Holiness Quartet	Do Lord Remember Me	20927	18 November 1927	Phipps	
39712	26 July 1927	Ernest Phipps and His Holiness Quartet	Old Ship of Zion	20927	18 November 1927	Phipps	
39713	26 July 1927	Ernest Phipps and His Holiness Quartet	Jesus Is Getting Us Ready for That Great Day	21192	2 March 1928	Phipps	
39714	26 July 1927	Ernest Phipps and His Holiness Quartet	Happy In Prison	21192	2 March 1928	Phipps	
39715	26 July 1927	Ernest Phipps and His Holiness Quartet	Don't You Grieve After Me	20834	16 September 1927	Phipps	
39716	27 July 1927	Uncle Eck Dunford/Ernest Stoneman/Hattie Stoneman/T. Edwards	The Whip-Poor-Will's Song	20880	4 November 1927	Dunford	
39717	27 July 1927	Uncle Eck Dunford/Ernest Stoneman/Hattie Stoneman/T. Edwards	What Will I Do, For My Money's All Gone	21578	5 October 1928	Dunford	
39718	27 July 1927	Uncle Eck Dunford/Ernest Stoneman/Hattie Stoneman/T. Edwards	Skip To Ma Lou Ma Darling	20938	16 December 1927	Dunford	
39719	27 July 1927	Uncle Eck Dunford/Ernest Stoneman/Hattie Stoneman/T. Edwards	Barney McCoy	20938	16 December 1927	Dunford	
39720	27 July 1927	Blue Ridge Corn Shuckers	Old Time Corn Shucking Part 1	20835	16 September 1927	Stoneman	similar personnel to Dixie Mountaineers
39721	27 July 1927	Blue Ridge Corn Shuckers	Old Time Corn Shucking Part 2	20835	16 September 1927	Stoneman	similar personnel to Dixie Mountaineers
39722	28 July 1927	Johnson Brothers With Tennessee Wildcats	Two Brothers Are We	21243	6 April 1928	Johnson	
39723	28 July 1927	Johnson Brothers	The Jealous Sweetheart	21243	6 April 1928	Johnson	another take issued on LP & CD
39724	28 July 1927	Johnson Brothers	A Passing Policeman			Johnson	issued on LP & CD
39725	28 July 1927	Blind Alfred Reed	The Wreck of the Virginian	20836	16 September 1927	Reed	another take issued on LP & CD
39726	28 July 1927	Blind Alfred Reed	I Mean To Live for Jesus	20939	16 December 1927	Reed	
39727	28 July 1927	Blind Alfred Reed	You Must Unload	20939	16 December 1927	Reed	
39728	28 July 1927	Blind Alfred Reed	Walking In The Way With Jesus	20836	16 September 1927	Reed	another take issued on LP & CD
39729	28 July 1927	Johnson Brothers With Tennessee Wildcats	The Soldier's Poor Little Boy	20891	4 November 1927	Johnson	
39730	28 July 1927	Johnson Brothers	Just A Message From Carolina	20891	4 November 1927	Johnson	
39731	28 July 1927	Johnson Brothers	I Want To See My Mother (Ten Thousand Miles Away)	20940	16 December 1927	Johnson	release date uncertain
39732	28 July 1927	El Watson	Pot Licker Blues	20951	18 November 1927	Watson	Only African American artist to record at Bristol Sessions
39733	28 July 1927	El Watson	Narrow Gauge Blues	20951	18 November 1927	Watson	Only African American artist to record at Bristol Sessions
39734	29 July 1927	B. F. Shelton	Cold Penitentiary Blues	V-40107	6 September 1929	Shelton	
39735	29 July 1927	B. F. Shelton	Oh Molly Dear	V-40107	6 September 1929	Shelton	
39736	29 July 1927	B. F. Shelton	Pretty Polly	35838	16 September 1927	Shelton	12 inch disc
39737	29 July 1927	B. F. Shelton	Darling Cora	35838	16 September 1927	Shelton	12 inch disc
39738	29 July 1927	Alfred Karnes	Called To The Foreign Field	V-40327	5 December 1930	Karnes	
39739	29 July 1927	Alfred Karnes	I Am Bound For The Promised Land	20840	16 September 1927	Karnes	
39740	29 July 1927	Alfred Karnes	Where We'll Never Grow Old	20840	16 September 1927	Karnes	
39741	29 July 1927	Alfred Karnes	When I See The Blood			Karnes	never issued
39742	29 July 1927	Alfred Karnes	When They Ring the Golden Bells	20933	2 December 1927	Karnes	
39743	29 July 1927	Alfred Karnes	To The Work	20933	2 December 1927	Karnes	
39744	1 August 1927	J.P. Nester	Train On The Island	21070	20 January 1928	Nester	
39745	1 August 1927	J.P. Nester	Georgia			Nester	never issued
39746	1 August 1927	J.P. Nester	John My Lover			Nester	never issued
39747	1 August 1927	J.P. Nester	Black Eyed Susie	21070	20 January 1928	Nester	
39748	1 August 1927	Bull Mountain Moonshiners	Sweet Marie			Bull Mountain	never issued
39749	1 August 1927	Bull Mountain Moonshiners	Johnny Goodwin	21141	28 February 1928	Bull Mountain	release date approximate
39750	1 August 1927	Carter Family	Bury Me Under The Weeping Willow	21074	20 January 1928	Carter	
39751	1 August 1927	Carter Family	Little Log Cabin By The Sea	21074	20 January 1928	Carter	
39752	1 August 1927	Carter Family	The Poor Orphan Child	20877	4 November 1927	Carter	
39753	1 August 1927	Carter Family	The Storms Are On The Ocean	20937	2 December 1928	Carter	
39754	2 August 1927	Carter Family	Single Girl, Married Girl	20937	2 December 1928	Carter	
39755	2 August 1927	Carter Family	The Wandering Boy	20877	4 November 1927	Carter	
39756	2 August 1927	Alcoa Quartet	Remember Me O Mighty One	20879	4 November 1927	Alcoa	
39757	2 August 1927	Alcoa Quartet	I'm Redeemed	20879	4 November 1927	Alcoa	
39758	2 August 1927	Henry Whitter	Henry Whitter's Fox Chase	20878	4 November 1927	Whitter	
39759	2 August 1927	Henry Whitter	Rain Crow Bill	20878	4 November 1927	Whitter	
39760	3 August 1927	Fred H. Greever, John B. Kelly, J. V. Snavely	When They Ring The Golden Bells For You And Me			Private	private recording, not made for release
39761	3 August 1927	Shelor Family	Big Bend Gal	20865	7 October 1927	Shelor	
39762	3 August 1927	Dad Blackard's Mountaineers	Suzanna Gal	21130	17 February 1928	Shelor	= Shelor Family
39763	3 August 1927	Dad Blackard's Mountaineers	Sandy River Belle	21130	17 February 1928	Shelor	= Shelor Family, another take issued on LP & CD
39764	3 August 1927	Shelor Family	Billy Grimes The Rover	20865	7 October 1927	Shelor	
39765	3 August 1927	Mr. and Mrs. J. W. Baker	The Newmarket Wreck	20863	7 October 1927	Baker	
39766	3 August 1927	Mr. and Mrs. J. W. Baker	On The Banks Of The Sunny Tennessee	20863	7 October 1927	Baker	
39767	4 August 1927	Jimmie Rodgers	The Soldier's Sweetheart	20864	7 October 1927	Rodgers	
39768	4 August 1927	Jimmie Rodgers	Sleep, Baby, Sleep	20864	7 October 1927	Rodgers	
39769	4 August 1927	Red Snodgrass' Alabamians	Weary Blues			Snodgrass	Jazz/dance band
39770	4 August 1927	Tenneva Ramblers	The Longest Train I Ever Saw	20861	7 October 1927	Tenneva	later recorded as Grant Brothers
39771	4 August 1927	Tenneva Ramblers	Sweet Heaven When I Die	20861	7 October 1927	Tenneva	later recorded as Grant Brothers
39772	4 August 1927	Tenneva Ramblers	Miss Liza, Poor Gal	21141	28 February 1928	Tenneva	later recorded as Grant Brothers, release date approximate
39773	5 August 1927	West Virginia Coon Hunters	Greasy String	20862	7 October 1927	West Virginia	
39774	5 August 1927	West Virginia Coon Hunters	Your Blue Eyes Run Me Crazy	20862	7 October 1927	West Virginia	
39775	5 August 1927	Tennessee Mountaineers	Standing On The Promises	20860	7 October 1927	Tennessee	mixed 20-voice choir
39776	5 August 1927	Tennessee Mountaineers	At The River	20860	7 October 1927	Tennessee	mixed 20-voice choir

== See also ==
- Johnson City sessions
- Music of East Tennessee
