= The Very Best of Woody Guthrie =

Very Best of Woody Guthrie

Greatest hits album by Woody Guthrie
- Released: May 31, 2005
- Recorded: April 16, 1944 – March 25, 1945
- Genre: Folk rock
- Label: Purple Pyramid (Cleopatra)

The Very Best of Woody Guthrie is a compilation album by American singer-songwriter and folk musician Woody Guthrie. It was released in May 2005 by Purple Pyramid, a sub-label of Cleopatra Records. The album contains 13 songs recorded between 1944 and 1945, plus a remix of "Worried Man Blues" which features the addition of guitar, acoustic bass, and snare drum.

== Critical reception ==
Professional ratings
Review scores
Source	Rating
Allmusic	2/5 stars

Allmusic writer William Ruhlmann said that "for the most part, this is not the Woody Guthrie of 'This Land Is Your Land', and thus far from his best." Ruhlmann was also critical of Purple Pyramid's decision to add the "Worried Man Blues" remix, calling the result "just as bad as it sounds like it would be, turning this disc into a mockery." Ruhlmann, however, did praise the inclusion of Dave Thompson's liner notes for each song on the album, as well as listings of recording dates and personnel.

== Track listing ==
1. "Worried Man Blues" (Guthrie, Terry) – 3:04
2. "Hard, Ain't It Hard" (Guthrie) – 2:44
3. "Buffalo Skinners" (Guthrie) – 3:25
4. "Pretty Boy Floyd" (Guthrie) – 3:06
5. "Columbus Stockade Blues" (Davis, Guthrie) – 2:25
6. "Gypsy Davy" (Guthrie) – 2:52
7. "Blowing Down That Old Dusty Road" (Guthrie, Hays) – 3:29
8. "John Henry" (Traditional) – 2:42
9. "More Pretty Girls Than One" (Guthrie, Smith) – 2:19
10. "Rangers Command" (Guthrie) – 2:56
11. "Danville Girl" (Guthrie, Houston) – 2:51
12. "Bury Me Beneath the Willow" (Guthrie, Houston) – 2:46
13. "Lonesome Day" (Guthrie, Waters) – 2:54
14. "Worried Man Blues"^{[A]} (Guthrie, Terry) – 3:36

Note

- A remixed by Danny B. Harvey.
