= WBCM =

WBCM may refer to:

- WBCM (FM), a radio station (93.5 FM) licensed to Boyne City, Michigan, United States
- WBCM-LP, a radio station (100.1 FM) licensed to Bristol, Virginia, United States
