= Delta Blind Billy =

American Delta blues musician

- Also known as: Blind Billy
- Genres: Delta blues
- Occupations: Artist, outlaw

Delta Blind Billy, or Blind Billy, was an American Delta blues artist and outlaw. As a traveling bluesman in Mississippi, he performed with his contemporaries Arthur Big Boy Crudup and Papa Charlie McCoy. One of his notable songs, "Hidden Man Blues", was an early variant of "Man of Constant Sorrow", with the following lyric: "Man of sorrow all my days / Left the home where I been raised." He recorded his version of "Man of Constant Sorrow" in the 1930s. His play on "Man of Constant Sorrow" suggests he traveled extensively, possibly through Appalachia. He is known for recording songs about being an outlaw, despite being legally blind. Delta Blind Billy is not to be confused with the earlier musician, Blind Billy, who was a former slave.

== Legacy ==
Blind Billy is referred to by the Italian media magazine LEFT as "the master of an entire generation of musicians." Many versions of "Man of Constant Sorrow" have been released and it remains a popular song in folk/bluegrass circles. The modern R&B artist Adia Victoria released the song, "Sea of Sand", referencing Delta Blind Billy in the chorus. Italian Artists Vittorio Giacopini and Valerio Billeri released an album and short story with illustrations on the "mysterious delta bluesman" Delta Blind Billy. Their album, La Trasfigurazione di Delta Blind Billy, peaked at number 50 on the Italian iTunes chart.
