= Charlie Poole =

American musician (1892–1931)

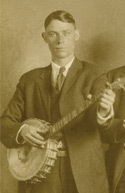
- Poole with the North Carolina Ramblers, circa 1923

Background information
- Born: Charles Cleveland Poole; March 22, 1892; Franklinville, North Carolina, U.S.
- Died: May 21, 1931 (aged 39) Spray, North Carolina, U.S.
- Genres: Old-time; country; folk; blues
- Occupations: Musician; singer
- Instruments: Banjo; vocals
- Years active: 1918–1931
- Formerly of: North Carolina Ramblers

Charles Alfie Poole (March 22, 1892 – May 21, 1931) was an American old-time musician and string band leader. His group, the North Carolina Ramblers, recorded many highly popular renditions of traditional songs from 1925 through 1930.

Poole is widely regarded as a pioneer of American country and folk music. His instrumental style and sound led to the development of bluegrass over the decade following his death, and in the years since, he has continued to have an influence on prominent recording artists, from Bob Dylan and Jerry Garcia to John Mellencamp and Billy Strings.

== Biography ==
Poole was born near the mill town of Franklinville, North Carolina. He was the son of John Philip Poole and Elizabeth Johnson. In 1918, he moved to the town of Spray, North Carolina, now part of Eden. As a child, he learned to play the banjo. He played baseball, and his three-fingered technique was the result of an accident. After Poole bet that he could catch a baseball without a glove, the ball broke his thumb as he closed his hand too soon, resulting in a permanent arch in his right hand.

Poole bought his first banjo, an Orpheum No. 3 Special, with profits from making moonshine. He later appeared in the 1929 Gibson Company catalog to promote their banjo.

He spent much of his adult life working in textile mills.

=== The North Carolina Ramblers ===
Milwaukee Blues

Poole and his brother-in-law, fiddle player Posey Rorer, whom he had met in West Virginia in 1917 and whose sister he married, formed a trio with guitarist Norman Woodlief called the North Carolina Ramblers. They auditioned in New York City for Columbia Records. After signing a contract, they recorded "Don't Let Your Deal Go Down Blues" on July 27 1925. This song was successful, selling over 106,000 copies at a time when only an estimated 6,000 phonographs were in the Southern United States, according to Poole's biographer and great-nephew, Kinney Rorrer. The band was paid $75 for the session.

For the next five years, Poole and the Ramblers were a popular band. The band's sound remained consistent, although several members came and left (including Posey Rorer and Norm Woodlief). The band recorded over 60 songs for Columbia Records during the 1920s, including "Sweet Sunny South", "White House Blues", "He Rambled", and "Take a Drink on Me". Former railroad engineer Roy Harvey was one of the guitarists. Fiddlers in various recording sessions were Posey Rorer, Lonnie Austin, and Odell Smith.

Bill C. Malone, in his history of country music, Country Music, U.S.A., says, "The Rambler sound was predictable: a bluesy fiddle lead, backed up by long, flowing, melodic guitar runs and the finger-style banjo picking of Poole. Predictable as it may be, it was nonetheless outstanding. No string band in early country music equaled the Ramblers' controlled, clean, well-patterned sound."

Poole composed few of his recordings, mostly covering old folk songs. Nevertheless, his dynamic renditions were popular with a broad audience in the Southeastern United States. He is considered a primary source for old-time music revivalists and aficionados. Songs like "Bill Morgan and His Gal", "Milwaukee Blues", and "Leavin' Home", have been resurrected by banjo players. Poole developed a unique fingerpicking style, a blend of melody, arpeggio, and rhythm (distinct from clawhammer/ frailing and Scruggs' variations).

Poole had been invited to Hollywood to play background music for a film, but died before this could happen in May 1931. His cause of death was a heart attack due to alcohol poisoning. According to some reports, he had been disheartened by the slump in record sales due to the Depression.

== Legacy ==
Poole's music had a revival in the 1960s, most likely due to his inclusion on the 1952 Anthology of American Folk Music, and his renditions have been re-recorded by numerous artists, such as John Mellencamp with "White House Blues", the Chieftains, New Lost City Ramblers, Holy Modal Rounders, and Hot Tuna with "Hesitation Blues", and Joan Baez with "Sweet Sunny South". The Grateful Dead's popular song "Deal" was influenced by "Don't Let Your Deal Go Down". His recordings have also appeared on numerous compilations of old-time music. Since 1995, Poole's legacy has been carried on every year in Eden, North Carolina, during June, when the Piedmont Folk Legacies, Inc, a nonprofit organization, hosts the Charlie Poole Music Festival. Bob Dylan in his Nobel Lecture acknowledged Poole and several lyrics of his song "You Ain't Talkin to Me".

Columbia Records issued a three-CD box set of his music titled You Ain't Talkin' to Me: Charlie Poole and the Roots of Country Music in 2005. The album, produced by Henry "Hank" Sapoznik, was nominated for three Grammy Awards. It chronicles the music Poole and the North Carolina Ramblers recorded for Columbia from 1925 through 1931, including such important songs as "Don't Let Your Deal Go Down", "Can I Sleep in Your Barn Tonight, Mister?", "Old and Only in the Way" (the title of which was adapted by Jerry Garcia for the name of his 1970s bluegrass band with David Grisman, Old and in the Way), and the politically charged "White House Blues", which John Mellencamp updated in 2004 under the title "To Washington". In addition to 43 of Poole's original recordings, the package features performances by other early roots musicians, including Fred Van Eps, Arthur Collins, Billy Murray, the Floyd Country Ramblers, Uncle Dave Macon, and the Red Fox Chasers.

The original liner notes, by Peter Stampfel, state, "Charlie Poole and the North Carolina Ramblers recorded an incredible number of songs that are personal favorites of mine. Poole is, in fact, one of the great musicians of the century. No doubt about it." The album's cover art was created by Robert Crumb, a celebrated illustrator and an old-time music aficionado.

Poole's grandnephew Kinney Rorer (sometimes spelled Rorrer) penned the highly regarded biography Ramblin' Blues: The Life and Songs of Charlie Poole in 1982. Rorer, who is also the grandnephew of Poole's fiddler Posey Rorer, is the banjo player for the old-time music group the New North Carolina Ramblers.

A double-CD tribute to Poole was released by singer-songwriter Loudon Wainwright III in August 2009. The album, titled High Wide & Handsome: The Charlie Poole Project, features 30 tracks, including new versions of songs originally recorded by Poole, as well as tunes on the artist's life and times composed by Wainwright and producer Dick Connette. The album earned the Grammy Award for Best Traditional Folk Album for 2009.

== Discography ==
Matrix	Title	Record #	Recording date
140786	"The Girl I Left in Sunny Tennessee"	Columbia 15043-D	July 27, 1925
140787	"I'm the Man That Rode the Mule 'Round the World"	Columbia 15043-D	July 27, 1925
140788	"Can I Sleep in Your Barn Tonight Mister?"	Columbia 15038-D	July 27, 1925
140789	"Don't Let Your Deal Go Down Blues"	Columbia 15038-D	July 27, 1925
142627	"Flying Clouds"	Columbia 15106-D	September 16, 1926
142631	"Wild Horse"	Columbia 15279-D	September 16, 1926
142632	"Forks of Sandy"	Columbia 15106-D	September 16, 1926
142633	"Mountain Reel"	Columbia 15279-D	September 16, 1926
142637	"Good-Bye Booze"	Columbia 15138-D	September 17, 1926
142638	"Monkey on a String"	Columbia 15099-D	September 17, 1926
142641	"Too Young to Marry"	Columbia15127-D	September 18, 1926
142642	"Ragtime Annie"	Columbia 15127-D	September 18, 1926
142643	"Little Dog Waltz"	Unissued	September 18, 1926
142644	"A Kiss Waltz"	Unissued	September 18, 1926
142645	"Leaving Home"	Columbia 15116-D	September 18, 1926
142646	"Budded Rose"	Columbia 15138-D	September 18, 1926
142657	"There'll Come a Time"	Columbia 15116-D	September 20, 1926
142658	"White House Blues"	Columbia 15099-D	September 20, 1926
142659	"The Highway Man"	Columbia 15160-D	September 20, 1926
142660	"Hungry Hash House"	Columbia 15160-D	September 20, 1926
144509	"If I Lose, I Don't Care"	Columbia 15215-D	July 25, 1927
144510	"On the Battle Fields of Belgium"	Unissued	July 25, 1927
144511	"You Ain't Talkin' to Me"	Columbia 15193-D	July 25, 1927
144512	"Coon from Tennessee"	Columbia 15215-D	July 25, 1927
144513	"When I Left My Good Old Home"	Unissued	July 25, 1927
144514	"The Letter That Never Came"	Columbia 15179-D	July 25, 1927
144515	"Take a Drink on Me"	Columbia 15193-D	July 25, 1927
144516	"Falling by the Wayside"	Columbia 15179-D	July 25, 1927
144517	"Down in Georgia"	Unissued	July 25, 1927
144518	"Sunset March"	Columbia 15184-D	July 26, 1927
144519	"Teasin' Fritz"	Unissued	July 26, 1927
144521	"Don't Let Your Deal Go Down Medley"	Columbia 15184-D	July 26, 1927
146767	"A Young Boy Left His Home One Day"	Columbia 15584-D	July 23, 1928
146768	"My Wife Went Away and Left Me"	Columbia 15584-D	July 23, 1928
146769	"I Cannot Call Her Mother"	Columbia 15307-D	July 23, 1928
146770	"I Once Loved a Sailor"	Columbia 15385-D	July 23, 1928
146771	"Husband and Wife Were Angry One Night"	Columbia 15342-D	July 23, 1928
146772	"Hangman, Hangman, Slack the Rope"	Columbia 15385-D	July 23, 1928
146773	"Ramblin' Blues"	Columbia 15286-D	July 23, 1928
146774	"Took My Gal a-Walking"	Columbia 15672-D	July 23, 1928
146775	"What Is Home Without Babies"	Columbia 15307-D	July 23, 1928
146776	"Jealous Mary"	Columbia 15342-D	July 23, 1928
146778	"Old and Only in the Way"	Columbia 15672-D	July 23, 1928
146779	"Shootin' Creek"	Columbia 15286-D	July 23, 1928
148469	"Bill Mason"	Columbia 15407-D	May 6, 1929
148470	"Goodbye Mary Dear"	Columbia 15456-D	May 6, 1929
148471	"Leaving Dear Old Ireland"	Columbia 15425-D	May 6, 1929
148472	"Baltimore Fire"	Columbia 15509-D	May 6, 1929
148474	"The Wayward Boy"	Columbia 15456-D	May 7, 1929
148475	"Sweet Sunny South"	Columbia 15425-D	May 7, 1929
148476	"He Rambled"	Columbia 15407-D	May 7, 1929
148477	"The Mother's Plea For Her Son"	Columbia 15509-D	May 7, 1929
2913	"San Antonio"	Broadway 8288	May 9, 1929
149900	"Sweet Sixteen"	Columbia 15519-D	January 23, 1930
149901	"My Gypsy Girl"	Columbia 15519-D	January 23, 1930
149902	"The Only Girl I Ever Loved"	Columbia 15711-D	January 23, 1930
149904	"Write Letter to My Mother"	Columbia 15711-D	January 23, 1930
149906	"If the River Was Whiskey"	Columbia 15545-D	January 23, 1930
149907	"It's Movin' Day"	Columbia 15545-D	January 23, 1930
149908	"Southern Medley"	Columbia 15615-D	January 23, 1930
149909	"Honeysuckle"	Columbia 15615-D	January 23, 1930
150773	"Goodbye Sweet Liza Jane"	Columbia 15601-D	September 9, 1930
150774	"Look Before You Leap"	Columbia 15601-D	September 9, 1930
150775	"One Moonlit Night"	Columbia 15688-D	September 9, 1930
150777	"Just Keep Waiting Till the Good Times Come"	Columbia 15636-D	September 9, 1930
150779	"Milwaukee Blues"	Columbia 15688-D	September 9, 1930
150780	"Where the Whippoorwill Is Whispering Goodnight"	Columbia 15636-D	September 9, 1930

=== Compilations ===
- Charlie Poole and the Highlanders: The Complete Paramount and Brunswick Recordings 1929 (Tompkins Square Records, April 20, 2013)
