= WBCM-LP =

Radio station in Bristol, Virginia

- Bristol, Virginia; United States
- Broadcast area: Bristol, Virginia; Bristol, Tennessee
- Frequency: 100.1 MHz
- Branding: WBCM Radio Bristol

Programming
- Format: Classic Country; Bluegrass; Americana

Ownership
- Owner: The Birthplace of Country Music Museum; (Birthplace of Country Music, Inc.)

History
- First air date: August 8, 2015
- Call sign meaning: Birthplace of Country Music

Technical information
- Licensing authority: FCC
- Facility ID: 193386
- ERP: 64 watts
- HAAT: 38 meters (125 ft)
- Transmitter coordinates: 36°35′45.0″N 82°9′42.0″W

Links
- Public license information: LMS
- Webcast: WBCM-LP Webstream
- Website: WBCM-LP Online

WBCM-LP is a classic country, bluegrass, and Americana-formatted broadcast radio station. Licensed to Bristol, Virginia, the station serves the twin cities of Bristol in Virginia and in Tennessee. The Birthplace of Country Music Museum owns and operates WBCM-LP.

The station, a working exhibit inside of the museum, went on the air for the first time in August 2015. The planning for the station dates back to late 2013. Programming includes live concerts held at the museum and the revival of "Farm and Fun Time". The latter program, a live and local radio music show, aired on Bristol's WCYB from the 1940s to the 1960s.

== History ==
=== Construction ===
The Birthplace of Country Music Museum applied for a construction permit to start a new low-power radio station, as part of the FCC's October 18, 2013, LPFM filing window. The application was granted and the construction permit issued on March 13, 2014. The station was to originally launch on 103.5 FM.

The company proposed, in its original application, that the station would "produce content that looks back at recording and radio technologies' impact on the world" along with "early country music, and current trends in roots and traditional music". It was also proposed that the station would "broadcast archival recordings of a variety of influential sources". The station would broadcast from inside The Birthplace of Country Music museum, located in Bristol, Virginia. Using vintage restored broadcasting equipment, the station would be a working exhibit inside the museum. The station's antenna would be placed on the WOPI tower, located on Delaney Street in Bristol, Virginia.

On April 14, 2014, the station received its call sign, WBCM-LP. The museum opened to the public on August 2, 2014. In March 2015, Tony Lawson, founder of Knoxville, Tennessee, radio station WDVX, was hired by the museum as station manager. He was tasked to "create a radio station and media center for the museum". Lawson had been consulting with The Birthplace of Country Music prior to being hired.

The Birthplace of Country Music received an email on May 27, 2015, voicing concern about WBCM-LP's potential interference with full-power station WIMZ-FM. WIMZ-FM, licensed to Knoxville, Tennessee, also broadcasting on 103.5 FM, can be heard in the Bristol area. The Birthplace of Country Music requested a new frequency for WBCM-LP, on June 10, 2015, out "of an overabundance of caution and to eliminate potential interference" to WIMZ-FM. On June 18, 2015, the frequency of the station was changed from 103.5 to 100.1 FM.

=== Launch ===
WBCM-LP began operations, with "program testing", on August 8, 2015. Six days later, the station was issued a License to Cover, allowing it to begin official operations. The official launch of the station took place at 4:00pm on August 27, 2015. A "launch event", held at The Birthplace of Country Music museum, included studio tours, a live concert broadcast on WBCM-LP, and a reception. Two online music streams and a mobile app, as well as the station's livestream, were also launched on the same day.

The museum plans to include the broadcast of numerous live concerts in the future.

== Programming and Reception ==
In addition to live concerts, WBCM-LP will air a revival of the Radio program "Farm and Fun Time". "Farm and Fun Time" aired on WCYB Radio (now WZAP) during the 1940s through the 1960s. Each edition of the program is broadcast live from The Birthplace of Country Music museum.

While focused on serving Bristol in Virginia and in Tennessee, the signal of WBCM-LP can be heard up to 30 miles away.

== See also ==
- Orthophonic Joy
- List of community radio stations in the United States
