= Emry Arthur =

American old-time musician, 1902–1967

Emry Paul Arthur
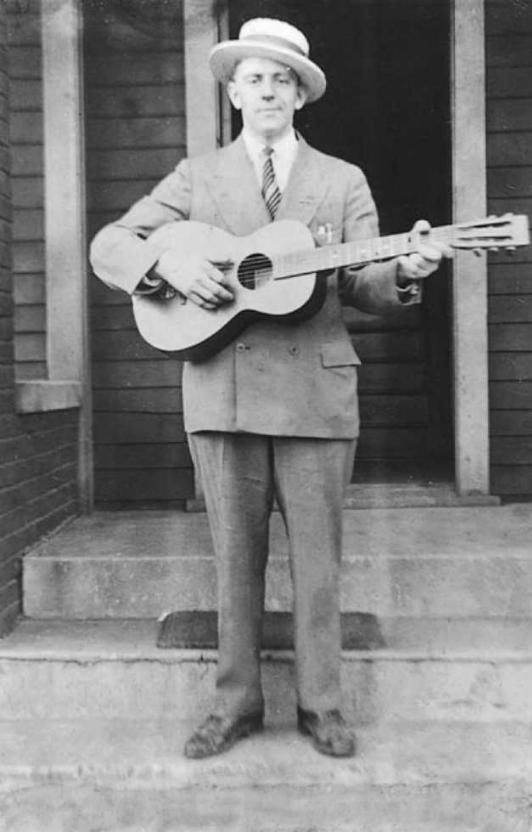
- Emry in 1929
- Born: September 17, 1902; Wayne County, Kentucky
- Died: August 22, 1967 (aged 64); Indianapolis, Indiana
- Occupation: Musician
- Known for: "Man of Constant Sorrow"

Emry Paul Arthur (September 17, 1902 – August 22, 1967) was an American old-time musician. Arthur played an early version of the song "Man of Constant Sorrow" in 1928.

== Childhood and youth ==
Emry Arthur was born around the turn of the century in the Elk Spring Valley in Wayne County, Kentucky. His father collected old traditional songs from Kentucky and the entire family was known for their music in the area. Young Arthur learned to play instruments like his brothers Henry and Sam, but after a hunting accident he was restricted to playing harmonica and strumming simply on the guitar. As a singer he built up a repertoire from different eras: the archaic local tradition; nineteenth century popular song and more contemporary gospel. One influence was probably the Wayne County singer and musician Dick Burnett, who claimed to have taught young Emry "I Am a Man of Constant Sorrow". Arthur was unable to earn a living from music, and work in general was hard to find, so in the mid-1920s he migrated to Indianapolis.

== Recording career ==
After a few years in Indianapolis, Arthur auditioned successfully for Vocalion Records. For his first sessions he summoned his brother Henry from Kentucky. With unidentified guitarists and with Henry on banjo, the brothers recorded vocal duets and solos by Emry, on some playing harmonica. One of Emry's solos was the first recording of "I Am A Man Of Constant Sorrow," which was released on 78-rpm record in 1928. Vocalion was impressed by good sales, particularly of the religious sides, and by the fact that Emry was Southern singer living conveniently in the North, so he was invited back to record frequently through 1928 and 1929. As with his first sessions, he recorded a mixture of solo songs and vocal duets, employing first Frank Owens then William Rexroat in place of Henry Arthur. In addition, he recorded with a succession of choirs led by Arthur and one led by Rexroat, as well as with a group singing in a non-Southern idiom led by Floyd Thomson.

In 1929, Emry's marriage broke up. Abandoning everything, he moved to Wisconsin, where he secured contacts with Paramount Records as a singer, and with their parent Wisconsin Chair Company as a factory hand. As before, he recorded a mixture of solos (including a second version of I Am A Man Of Constant Sorrow) and vocal duets. But now his singing partner was Della Hatfield, who became his second wife. They continued to record for Paramount until the near collapse of the recording industry in 1931.

Also in 1929, Arthur was involved with William Myers, a songwriter in Richlands, Virginia. Previously, Myers had posted his songs to singers he admired, including Mississippi John Hurt and Dock Boggs. Now he decided to start a record label, named Lonesome Ace. This folded after three recordings: one by Arthur and two by Boggs with Arthur accompanying.

In 1935, the recording industry had recovered somewhat, and Emry recorded a final session with Decca Records.

== Later life and death ==
At some point, Emry and Della moved back to Indianapolis, where they lived for the rest of their lives, about which nothing is known. Emry Arthur died in 1967, survived by Della for almost four decades.

Old Homestead Records collected some of Arthur's recordings on I Am a Man of Constant Sorrow in 1987.
