= Birthplace of Country Music Museum =

Museum in Bristol, Virginia, United States

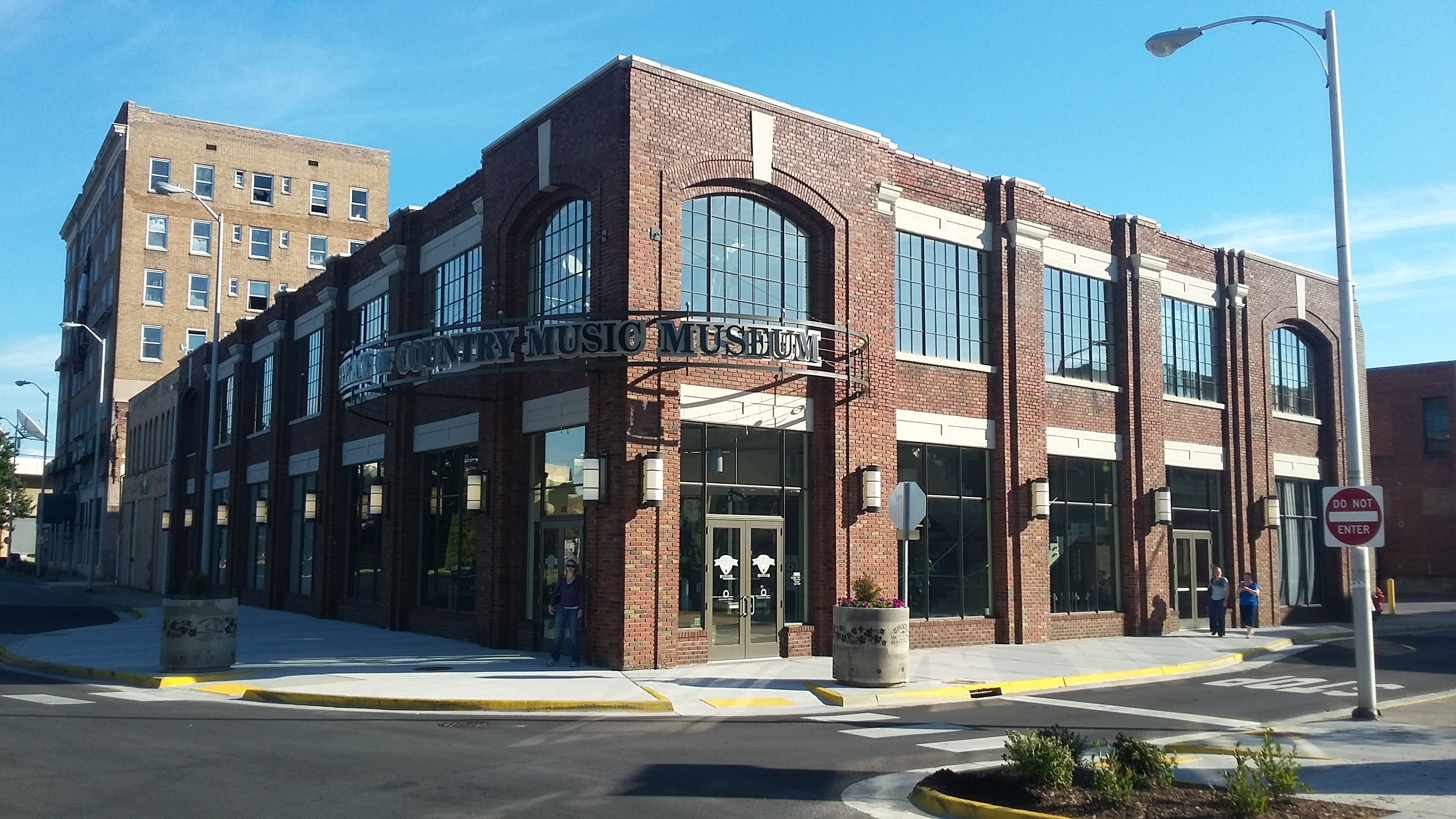
- Established: 1 August 2014
- Location: Bristol, Virginia, U.S.
- Coordinates: 36°35′46″N 82°10′58″W
- Type: Hall of fame
- Website: birthplaceofcountrymusic.org

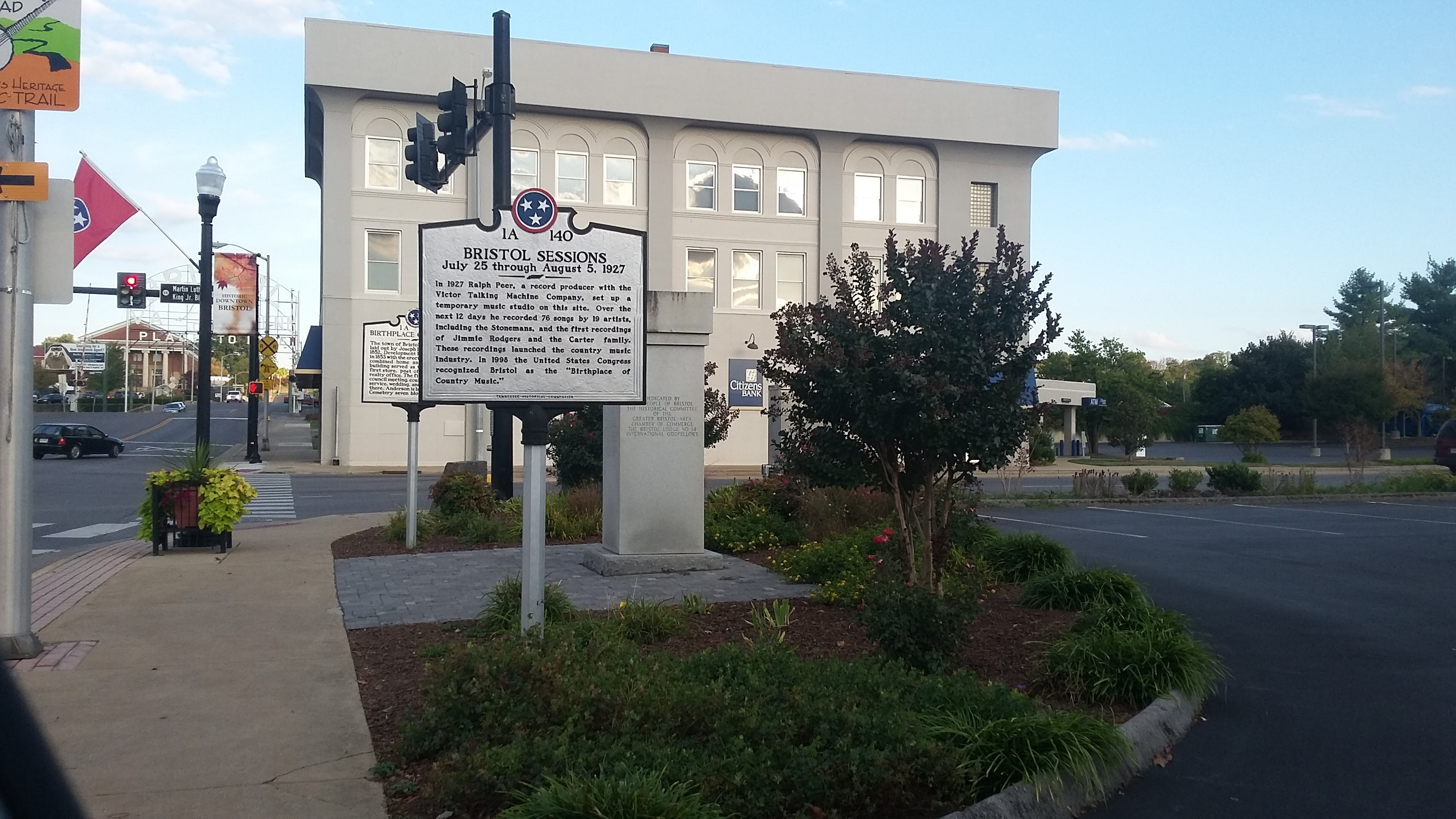
Site of Bristol Sessions Recordings in Bristol, Tennessee, now a parking lot on the site of the former warehouse where the recordings took place

Birthplace of Country Music Museum is a museum celebrating the historic 1927 Bristol Sessions, which recorded some of the earliest country music in America when the Carter Family and Jimmie Rodgers and several other musicians recorded for the first time before gaining prominence. The museum is located at 520 Birthplace of Country Music Way in Bristol, Virginia. A live radio station WBCM-LP broadcasts from within the museum. The original site of the Bristol recordings is marked by a plaque several blocks from the museum.

== See also ==
- WBCM-LP
- Orthophonic Joy
- List of music museums
