= Cuje Bertram =

American musician

Bennie Esterd "Cuje" Bertram (August 24, 1894 – April 2, 1993) was an American old-time fiddle player from Kentucky. Bertram, who was African-American, played in the same style as neighboring white musicians of the region. While musicians such as Leonard Rutherford and Dick Burnett were popular recording artists, record companies were not interested in producing old-time music for the race record market.

Bertram was born in Fentress County, Tennessee, United States, into a musical family. Through the 1920s and 1930s, he played with other musicians of the Cumberland Plateau. Despite prevailing racial segregation, he played frequently with the white fiddler Leonard Rutherford, who would stay at Bertram's house to make music. He also deputised for Rutherford with the white banjo player Dick Burnett, playing in the courthouse square of Monticello.

Around 1970, he made home recordings, which were issued by Document Records on the CD Black Fiddlers 1929-c1970.

Bertram died in April 1993 in Marion, Indiana.
