= Bob Cranford =

American singer

Bob Cranford was a vocalist and harmonica player for the late 1920s and early 1930s string band, The Red Fox Chasers.
