= Battle of the Cumberland Gap =

Battle of the Cumberland Gap may refer to:

- Battle of the Cumberland Gap (1862)
- Battle of the Cumberland Gap (1863)

== See also ==
- Battle of Folck's Mill, also known as Battle of Cumberland
- Cumberland Gap (disambiguation)
