= Bury Me Beneath the Willow =

Song

- Folk song
- Catalogue: Roud 410
- Text: Traditional
- Language: English
- Melody: Traditional
- Published: earlier than 1909

"Bury Me Beneath the Willow" is a traditional ballad folk song, listed as number 410 in the Roud Folk Song Index. It is also known as "Bury Me Beneath the Weeping Willow", "The Weeping Willow", "The Willow Tree" and "Under the Willow Tree". Its author is unknown.

The first citation to the song appears in Henry Marvin Belden's 1909 compilation Ballads and Songs Collected by the Missouri Folk-Lore Society as "Under the Willow Tree".

The song's lyrics relate that the singer's lover has left her (in some descriptions just prior to their wedding). She asks that she be buried beneath the willow tree, in the hopes that her lover will still think of her.

== Recordings and performances ==
The song has been recorded by several artists and was the signature tune of Chicago folksinger Linda Parker. Performers recording the song include: Dick Burnett and Leonard Rutherford (1927); the Carter Family (1927); The Delmore Brothers (1938); The Shelton Brothers and Curly Fox (1936); and Ricky Skaggs, Tony Rice (1980). Rosanne Cash (2010) and Emmylou Harris (2011)

The Carter Family also recorded an answer song, "Answer To Weeping Willow", in 1936. The lyrics are from the point of view of the original singer's lover, telling how he had not really left her, and that she was actually his true love and he had never meant for her to think otherwise.

In October 2020, Dolly Parton spontaneously performed some lyrics from the song as a guest on The Late Show with Stephen Colbert, referencing her mother who used to sing it to her. Parton's rendition was lauded by Colbert, bringing him to tears.

A rendition of “Bury Me Beneath the Willow”, performed by bluegrass singer-songwriter Molly Tuttle, is featured in The Hunger Games: The Ballad of Songbirds & Snakes (2023) film soundtrack.
