= Man of Constant Sorrow =

American folk song

Song by Dick Burnett
- Published: 1913
- Recorded: 1927 (unreleased)
- Genre: Folk
- Label: Columbia
- Songwriter: Traditional

"Man of Constant Sorrow" (also known as "I Am a Man of Constant Sorrow") is a traditional American folk song first published by Dick Burnett, a musician from Kentucky. It was titled "Farewell Song" in a song book by Burnett dated 1913, but may have earlier origins. A version recorded by Emry Arthur in 1928 gave the song its current title.

Several versions of the song exist that differ in their lyrics and melodies. The song was popularized by the Stanley Brothers, who recorded the song in the 1950s, and many others recorded versions in the 1960s including Bob Dylan. Variations of the song have also been recorded under the titles of "Girl of Constant Sorrow" by Joan Baez as well as by Barbara Dane, "Maid of Constant Sorrow" by Judy Collins, and "Sorrow" by Peter, Paul and Mary. It was released as a single by Ginger Baker's Air Force with vocals by Denny Laine.

Public interest in the song was renewed after the release of the 2000 film O Brother, Where Art Thou?, in which it is performed by the three runaway protagonists, earning them public recognition and playing a pivotal role in the plot. The recording used in the film, sung by Dan Tyminski, was featured on the multiple platinum-selling soundtrack which won a Grammy for Best Country Collaboration at the 44th Annual Grammy Awards in 2002.

== Origin ==
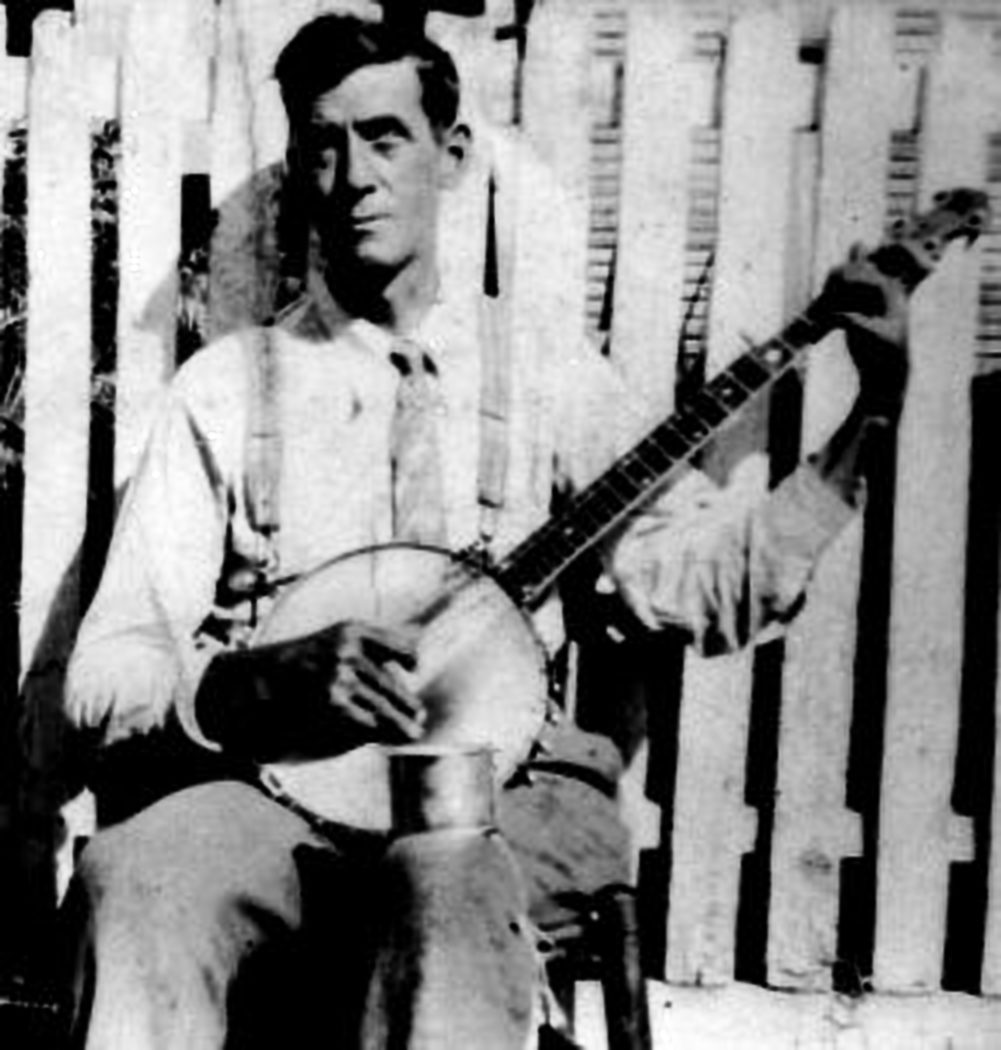
Dick Burnett with banjo and beggar's cup

The original song was first published in 1913 and named "Farewell Song" in Dick Burnett's six-song songbook titled Songs Sung by R. D. Burnett—The Blind Man—Monticello, Kentucky. There is some uncertainty as to whether Dick Burnett was the original writer; in an interview he gave towards the end of his life, he was asked about the song and said:

Charles Wolfe: "What about this "Farewell Song" – 'I am a man of constant sorrow' – did you write it?" Richard Burnett: "No, I think I got the ballad from somebody – I dunno. It may be my song ..."

Whether or not Burnett was the original writer, his influence on the song can be dated to as early as 1913. The lyric from the second verse—'Oh, six long year I've been blind, friends'— references the year he was blinded in a shooting/robbery in 1907. Burnett may have tailored an already existing song to fit his blindness, and some claim that he derived it from "The White Rose" and "Down in the Tennessee Valley" circa 1907. It has also been said that Burnett claimed that he based the melody on an old Baptist hymn which he remembered as "Wandering Boy". No song with this or a similar title had a similar tune that can be identified with "Constant Sorrow," according to hymnologist John Garst. Garst also noted that parts of the lyrics suggest a possible antecedent hymn, and that the term 'man of sorrows' is religious in nature and appears in Isaiah 53:3. The song has some similarities to the hymn "Poor Pilgrim," also known as "I Am a Poor Pilgrim of Sorrow," which George Pullen Jackson believes to have been derived from an English folk song titled, "The Green Mossy Banks of the Lea".

Emry Arthur, a friend of Burnett's, released a recording of the song in 1928 who also claimed to have written it. Arthur titled his recording "I Am a Man of Constant Sorrow", which has become the popular name for the song. Arthur's lyrics are very similar to Burnett's with one minor variation. Although Burnett's version was recorded earlier in 1927, Columbia Records did not release Burnett's recording; Arthur's single was thus the earliest widely heard recording of the song, and it is the ultimate source of most later versions.

Several similar songs were found in Kentucky and Virginia in the early 20th century. English folk-song collector Cecil Sharp collected four versions of the song in 1917–1918 as "In Old Virginny", which were published in 1932 in English Folk Songs from the Southern Appalachians. The lyrics were different in lyric from Burnett's but similar in tone. In a version from 1918 by Mrs Frances Richards who may have learned it from her father, the first verse is nearly identical to Burnett and Arthur's lyrics, with minor changes like the substitution of Virginia for Kentucky. The song is thought to be related to several songs, for example "East Virginia Blues." Norman Lee Vass of Virginia claimed his brother Mat wrote the song in the 1890s. The Virginia versions of the song show some relationship to Vass's version, though his melody and most of his verses are unique. This version is thought to be influenced by "Come All You Fair and Tender Ladies"/"The Little Sparrow".

Verses with substantial similarity to the first stanza of the song were published in the mid-19th century. For example, the following was published in the advertising columns of The Washington Star in 1854 – "I am a man of constant sorrow / I have seen trouble all my days / I'll bid farewell to you, my dear / With whom I expect to end my life." Another was published in The Knickerbocker in 1861 – "I AM a man of constant sorrow / I have seen trubble in my days / I'll Bid farewell to S----r county / the place Whare I Was partly Raised."

An older version of the song described by Almeda Riddle dating to around 1850, contain lyrics that differ substantially after the first line. John Garst traced elements of the song back to the hymns of the early 1800s, suggesting similarity in its tune to "Tender-Hearted Christians" and "Judgment Hymn," as well as similarity in its lyrics to "Christ Suffering," which included the lines "He was a man of constant sorrow / He went a mourner all his days."

On October 13, 2009, on the Diane Rehm Show, Ralph Stanley of the Stanley Brothers, whose autobiography is titled Man of Constant Sorrow, discussed the song, its origin, and his effort to revive it:

"Man of Constant Sorrow" is probably two or three hundred years old. But the first time I heard it when I was y'know, like a small boy, my daddy – my father – he had some of the words to it, and I heard him sing it, and we – my brother and me – we put a few more words to it, and brought it back in existence. I guess if it hadn't been for that it'd have been gone forever. I'm proud to be the one that brought that song back, because I think it's wonderful.

== Variations ==
Many later singers have included and changed the lyrics to the song. Most versions include lyrics depicting the singer riding a train fleeing trouble, regretting not seeing his old love, and contemplating his future death, with the promise that he will meet his friends or lover again on the beautiful God's golden shore. In most variations, the first stanza is very similar to Burnett's 1913 version, often modified to suit each singer's home state and sex, with other minor changes:

I am a man of constant sorrow,
I've seen trouble all of my days;
I'll bid farewell to old Kentucky,
The place where I was born and raised.

The 1928 recording by Emry Arthur is largely consistent with Burnett's lyrics, with only minor difference. The reference to blindness in the second verse of Burnett's lyrics, "six long year I've been blind," was changed to "six long years I've been in trouble," which was also found in later versions of the song.

In around 1936, Sarah Ogan Gunning rewrote the song, changing "Man" to "Girl" and significantly changing the majority of the song as well. Gunning claims to have remembered the melody from a 78-rpm hillbilly record (Emry Arthur, 1928) that she had heard some years before. The change of gender is also found in Joan Baez's "Girl of Constant Sorrow" as well as in Judy Collins's title song from her album A Maid of Constant Sorrow.

In 1950, the Stanley Brothers recorded a version of the song they had learned from their father. Their version contains some changes to the lyrics: one verse of Burnett's version is absent, the last line is different, and parents in Burnett's second verse was changed to friends. Performances of the song by the Stanley Brothers and Mike Seeger also contributed to the song's popularity in urban folksong circles during the American folk music revival of the 1950s and 1960s.

Bob Dylan recorded his version in 1961, which he based on versions performed by other folk singers such as Baez and Seeger. He omitted a verse from the Stanleys Brothers' version and significantly rearranged and rewrote other verses. Dylan also added personal elements, changing friends to mother in the verse, 'Your mother says that I'm a stranger' which makes reference to the mother of his then-girlfriend Suze Rotolo. In Dylan's version, Kentucky was also changed to Colorado. It is common to change the state of origin in this song, for example as seen in Baez and Collins versions where Kentucky is changed to California.

Aside from the lyrics, the melody also differs between various versions of the song.

== Recordings and cover versions ==
"I Am a Man of Constant Sorrow"

Song by Emry Arthur
- Released: January 18, 1928
- Genre: Old-time
- Length: 3:18
- Label: Vocalion
- Songwriter: Unknown

Burnett recorded the song in 1927 with Columbia Records; this version was unreleased and the master recording was destroyed. The first commercially released recording was by Emry Arthur on January 18, 1928 with Vocalion Records (Vo 5208). Arthur sang it while playing his guitar accompanied by banjoist Dock Boggs. Due to the success of the record, the singer recorded it again in 1931.

As the first released recording of the song, its melody and lyrics formed the basis for subsequent versions and variations. Although a few singers had also recorded the song, it did not gain relevance until The Stanley Brothers recorded their version in 1950 and helped popularize the song in the 1960s.

The use of the song in the 2000 film O Brother, Where Art Thou? led to its renewed popularity in the 21st century. The song has since been covered by many singers, from the Norwegian girl-group Katzenjammer to the winner of the eighth season of The Voice Sawyer Fredericks.

=== Stanley Brothers versions ===
"I Am a Man of Constant Sorrow"

Song by The Stanley Brothers
- Released: May 1951
- Recorded: November 3, 1950
- Genre: Folk; bluegrass
- Length: 2:56
- Label: Columbia
- Songwriter: Unknown

Official audio
- "I'm A Man Of Constant Sorrow" on YouTube

On November 3, 1950, the Stanley Brothers recorded their version of the song with Columbia Records at the Castle Studios in Nashville, Tennessee. The Stanleys learned the song from their father Lee Stanley who had turned the song into a hymn which was sung a cappella in the Primitive Baptist tradition. The arrangement of the song in the recording, however, was their own and the song was performed in a faster tempo. This recording, titled "I Am a Man of Constant Sorrow," was released as a single in May 1951 along with "The Lonesome River" (Columbia 20816). Because neither Burnett nor Arthur copyrighted the song, Carter Stanley was able to copyright the song as his own work in 1951.

On September 15, 1959, the Stanley Brothers re-recorded the song with King Records for their album Everybody's Country Favorite. In the 1950 version, Ralph Stanley sang the solo for the duration of the song but was joined by other members of the band in added refrains in the 1959 version. The fiddle and mandolin in the earlier version were also replaced by the guitar with a verse omitted. This version (King 45-5269) was released together with "How Mountain Girls Can Love" as a single in October 1959.

In July 1959, the Stanley Brothers performed the song at the Newport Folk Festival, gaining the attention of other folk singers. It led to a number of recordings of the song in the 1960s, most notably by Joan Baez (1960), Bob Dylan (1961), Judy Collins (1961), and Peter, Paul and Mary (1962).

=== Bob Dylan versions ===
"Man of Constant Sorrow"

Song by Bob Dylan

from the album Bob Dylan
- Released: March 19, 1962
- Recorded: November 1961
- Genre: Folk; country blues
- Length: 3:10
- Label: Columbia
- Songwriter: Unknown

In November 1961 Bob Dylan recorded the song titled "Man of Constant Sorrow" and it was included as a track on his 1962 eponymous debut album. Dylan's version is a rewrite of the versions sung by Joan Baez, New Lost City Ramblers (Mike Seeger's band), among others in the early 1960s. He also performed the song during his first national US television appearance in the spring of 1963. Dylan's version of the song was used by other singers and bands of the 1960s and 70s, such as Rod Stewart and Ginger Baker's Air Force.

Dylan performed a different version of the song with adapted lyrics of the Stanley Brothers' lyrics during his 1988 Never Ending Tour. He performed the song intermittently in the 1990s as well as performed it during his European tour in 2002. A recording of the performance was released in 2005 on the Martin Scorsese PBS television documentary on Dylan, No Direction Home, as well as on the accompanying soundtrack album, The Bootleg Series Vol. 7: No Direction Home.

=== Ginger Baker's Air Force version ===
"Man of Constant Sorrow"

Song by Ginger Baker's Air Force

from the album Ginger Baker's Air Force
- Released: March 1970
- Genre: Rock
- Length: 3:31
- Label: ATCO Records, Polydor
- Songwriter: Unknown

The song was recorded in 1970 by Ginger Baker's Air Force and sung by Air Force guitarist and vocalist (and former Moody Blues, future Wings member) Denny Laine. The single was studio recorded, but a live version, recorded at the Royal Albert Hall, was included in their eponymous 1970 debut album. The band used a melody similar to Dylan's, and preserved most of Dylan's lyrics other than substituting Birmingham for Colorado. The arrangement differed significantly, with the use of violin, electric guitar, and saxophones, although it stayed mainly in the major scales of A, D and E. It was the band's only chart single.

==== Charts ====
Chart (2008)	Peak position
US Billboard Hot 100	85
Canada Top Singles (RPM)	64

=== Soggy Bottom Boys version ===
"I Am a Man of Constant Sorrow"

Song by The Soggy Bottom Boys

from the album O Brother, Where Art Thou?
- Released: December 5, 2000
- Genre: Bluegrass; country; folk; blues
- Length: 4:20
- Label: Mercury Nashville
- Songwriter: Unknown
- Producer: T Bone Burnett

Official audio
- "I Am A Man Of Constant Sorrow" (With Band) on YouTube

A notable cover, titled "I Am a Man of Constant Sorrow," was recorded by the fictional folk/bluegrass group The Soggy Bottom Boys in the film O Brother, Where Art Thou?. Film producer T Bone Burnett had previously suggested the Stanley Brothers' recording as a song for The Dude in the Coen brothers' film The Big Lebowski, but it did not make the cut. For their next collaboration on O Brother, Where Art Thou?, he realized that the song would suit the main character well. The initial plan was for the song to be sung by the film's lead actor, George Clooney. However, it was found that his recording was not up to the required standard. Burnett later said that he had only two or three weeks to work with Clooney, which was not enough time to prepare Clooney for the recording of a credible hit country record.

The song was recorded by Dan Tyminski (lead vocals), with Harley Allen and Pat Enright and was based on the Stanleys' version. Tyminski also wrote, played, and altered the guitar part of the arrangement. Two versions by Tyminski's rendition were found in the soundtrack album both with different backup instruments. In the film, it was a hit for the Soggy Bottom Boys, and would later become a real hit off-screen. Tyminski has performed the song at the Crossroads Guitar Festival with Ron Block and live with Alison Krauss.

The song received a CMA Award for "Single of the Year" in 2001 and a Grammy for "Best Country Collaboration with Vocals" in 2002. The song was also named Song of the Year by the International Bluegrass Music Association in 2001. It peaked at No. 35 on Billboard's Hot Country Songs chart. It has sold over a million copies in the United States by November 2016.

==== Personnel ====
- Banjo – Ron Block
- Bass – Barry Bales
- Dobro – Jerry Douglas
- Fiddle – Stuart Duncan
- Guitar – Chris Sharp
- Harmony vocals – Harley Allen, Pat Enright
- Lead vocals, guitar – Dan Tyminski
- Mandolin – Mike Compton
- Arranged by – Carter Stanley

==== Charts ====
Chart (2002)	Peak position
France (SNEP)	167
US Hot Country Songs (Billboard)	35

=== Other versions of the song ===
- 1920s – American Delta blues artist Delta Blind Billy in his song "Hidden Man Blues" had the line 'Man of sorrow all my days / Left the home where I been raised.'
- 1937 – Alan Lomax recorded Sarah Ogan Gunning's performance of her version, "I Am a Girl of Constant Sorrow", for the Library of Congress's Archive of American Folk Song. Her version was also covered by other singers such as Peggy Seeger (her melody however is more similar to Arthur's version), Tossi Aaron, and Barbara Dane. She recorded the song again at the 1964 Newport Folk Festival, and also released a recording in her album, Girl of Constant Sorrow, in 1965.
- 1947 – Lee and Juanita Moore's performance at a radio station WPAQ was recorded and later released in 1999. They were granted a new copyright registration in 1939 for their treatment of the song.
- 1960 – A version of the song, "Girl of Constant Sorrow", was recorded by Joan Baez in the summer of 1960. This version was left off the original release of her debut album Joan Baez in 1960 on the Vanguard label, but was included as a bonus track on the 2001 CD-reissue version of the album. Baez has also recorded "Man of Constant Sorrow" with no change in gender.
- 1961 – Judy Collins's 1961 debut album, A Maid of Constant Sorrow, took its name from a variant of the song which was included on the album.
- 1961 – Roscoe Holcomb recorded a version.
- 1962 – It appears on Mike Seeger's album Old Time Country Music, Folkways FA 2325. Mike Seeger recorded three versions of the song.
- 1962 – in their 1962 self-titled debut album, Peter, Paul and Mary recorded another version as "Sorrow".
- 1966 – It was recorded by Waylon Jennings on his 1966 major-label debut Folk-Country.
- 1969 – Rod Stewart covered the song in his debut solo album. It was based on Dylan's version but with his own arrangement.
- Cambodian singer Pan Ron recorded a Khmer version where local instruments such as the three-stringed tro replaced the violins of Stanley Brothers' recording to created distinctive Cambodian version.
- 1972 – An a cappella version appears on The Dillards' 1972 LP Roots and Branches. This version had only two verses and replaced Kentucky with Missouri.
- 1972 – Tia Blake recorded a version on her 1972 album Folk Songs and Ballads. She was only nineteen years old at the time of recording.
- 1993 – "Man of Constant Sorrow" was one of many songs recorded by Jerry Garcia, David Grisman, and Tony Rice one weekend in February 1993. Jerry's taped copy of the session was later stolen by his pizza delivery man, eventually became an underground classic, and finally edited and released in 2000 as The Pizza Tapes.
- 2003 - Skeewiff "Man of Constant Sorrow" was ranked 96 in the Triple J Hottest 100, 2003, released on Volume 11 disk 1 track 20.
- 2012 - Charm City Devils released "Man Of Constant Sorrow" which charted on various Billboard rock charts - No. 25 on Mainstream Rock Songs No. 22 on Active Rock, and No. 48 on Hot Rock Songs.
- 2015 – Dwight Yoakam covered the song in his album Second Hand Heart. Yoakam's rendition has been described as having a 'rockabilly' sound.
- 2015 – Blitzen Trapper covered the song exclusively for the black comedy–crime drama television series Fargo, which played over the credits of the "Rhinoceros" episode of the second season.
- Sawyer Fredericks covered the song during his blind audition in Season 8 of The Voice in 2015.
- 2018 – Home Free covered the song in a country / a capella style. It was released also on their album Timeless.
- 2021 - In the Channel 4 sitcom We Are Lady Parts, the main character, Amina, sings a variation of the song with the lyrics changed to fit her situation.

== Parodies ==
In 2002, Cledus T. Judd recorded a parody titled "Man of Constant Borrow" with Diamond Rio on his album Cledus Envy.
