= Cumberland Gap (disambiguation) =

Cumberland Gap is a mountain pass in the Appalachian Mountains at the juncture of the U.S. states of Tennessee, Kentucky, and Virginia.

Cumberland Gap may also refer to:

- Cumberland Gap National Historical Park, a U.S. national park protecting the Cumberland Gap
- Cumberland Gap Tunnel, a tunnel that carries U.S. Route 25E under the aforementioned mountain pass
- Cumberland Gap (song), an Appalachian folk song made famous by a Woody Guthrie recording in the 1940s and a skiffle version by Lonnie Donegan in 1957
- Cumberland Gap, Tennessee, town near the Cumberland Gap pass
- Cumberland Gap, a former six mile stretch of the A74 road in Cumberland, England between the A74(M) and M6 motorways, now replaced by an extension to the latter

== See also ==
- Cumberland (disambiguation)
