= Uncle Am Stuart =

American fiddler (1853–1926)

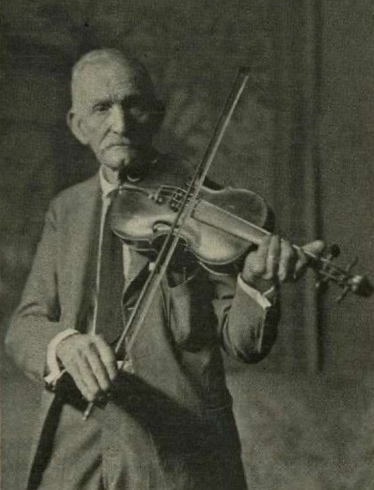

Background information
- Born: Ambrose Gaines Stuart; August 24, 1853 near Morristown, Tennessee, United States
- Died: March 17, 1926 (aged 72) Morristown, Tennessee, United States
- Genres: Old-time
- Instrument: fiddle
- Years active: 1924
- Label: Vocalion

Ambrose Gaines "Uncle Am" Stuart (1853–1926) was an American Old-time fiddle player. After winning various fiddle contests across the Southern Appalachian region in the late 19th and early 20th centuries, Stuart made several recordings in June 1924 that would later prove influential in the development of early Country music.

Stuart was born near Morristown, Tennessee in 1853. He learned to play fiddle at a young age, picking up a number of tunes from Civil War soldiers who passed through the area in the 1860s, and learning techniques while wandering through post-Civil War African-American camps. His later style represented a fusion of Civil War tunes and Appalachian folk music. By the time he had gained regional fame as a fiddle player in the early 1900s, Stuart was working as a safe and vault salesman.

Uncle Am Stuarts brother, George R. Stuart, was an evangelist. He and his brother, with the help of Thomas Ryman and Sam. P Jones, would hold revivals in Nashville, Tennessee. Ryman was a riverboat captain, and Jones was another popular preacher as George R. Stuart was. The meetings would be held in the Union Gospel tabernacle, which was renamed the Ryman Auditorium in 1904 after the passing of Thomas Ryman.

Uncle Am never played for his own personal gain. He simply played for his own merriment and for the pleasure of others.

Noting the success of the Okeh recordings of Fiddlin' John Carson in 1923, Vocalion Records sought to recruit its own Southern mountain musicians, and the following year invited several Southern Appalachian musicians to New York to record, among them Uncle Am Stuart. The 14 sides Stuart recorded included the first known recordings of the Appalachian folk songs Cumberland Gap and "Forked Deer," early renditions of the oft-played fiddle tunes "Grey Eagle" and "Old Granny Rattletrap," and early renderings of later bluegrass staples "Sallie Gooden" and "Old Liza Jane."

In 1925, Stuart attended the Fiddlers' Convention in Mountain City, Tennessee, where he competed in a now-legendary fiddle contest against rival fiddlers such as Charlie Bowman, G. B. Grayson, Dudley Vance, and Fiddlin' John Carson. Accounts vary as to the contest's results, although at least one account placed Stuart in third place. In the early 1930s, Stuart's Vocalion recordings were among those a young Roy Acuff sought to emulate while learning to play the fiddle.

Stuart placed first in a fiddlers contest at the United States capital against 26 of the nation's best old-time fiddlers. After the contest, Stuart contracted Pneumonia that would prove fatal.

When Stuart passed away in 1926, many people sought to pay their respects to the fiddler. At the funeral, a basket of flowers was offered with a broken bow and a decorated fiddle inside.
