= When They Ring Those Golden Bells =

American Christian hymn

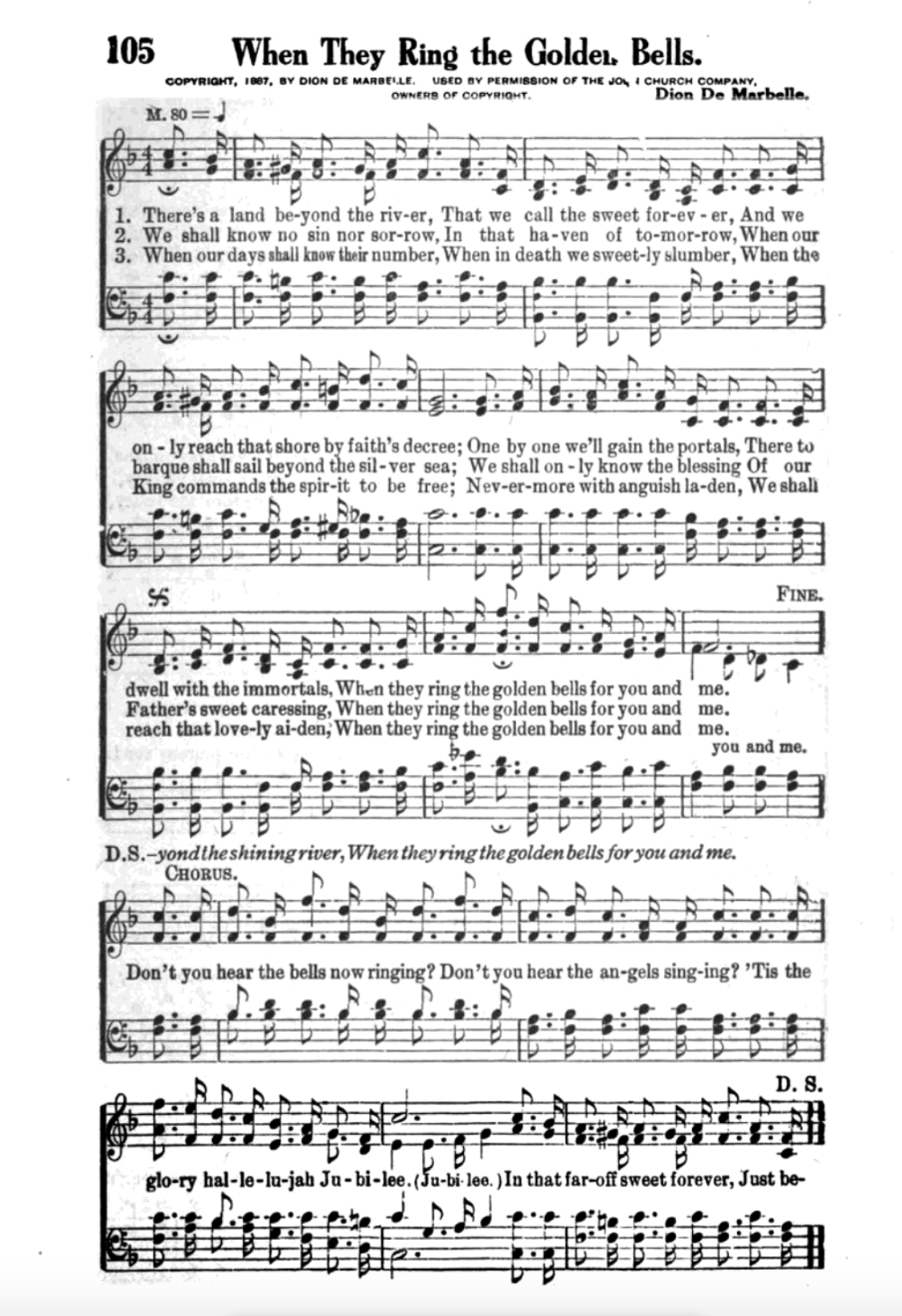
1922 publication of the song

When They Ring Those Golden Bells (also known as There's a Land Beyond the River or When They Ring the Golden Bells) is a prominent American gospel and bluegrass song written in 1887 by Daniel de Marbelle, a European immigrant, veteran of the American Civil War and Mexican War, and circus leader.

The song describes heaven as "beyond the river", a phrase found in the Bible in Ezra 4:11 and "golden bells" a reference found in Exodus 39:25. Marbelle was purportedly cheated out of the copyright to the song and died penniless. The copyright was acquired by the John Church Company, and the song was first known to be recorded in 1915 by the Imperial Quartet. The song has been covered by many notable artists including Dolly Parton, Natalie Merchant, Jerry Lee Lewis, and Alfred Karnes at the 1927 Bristol sessions.
