= Dick Burnett (musician) =

American folksinger and songwriter (1883–1977)

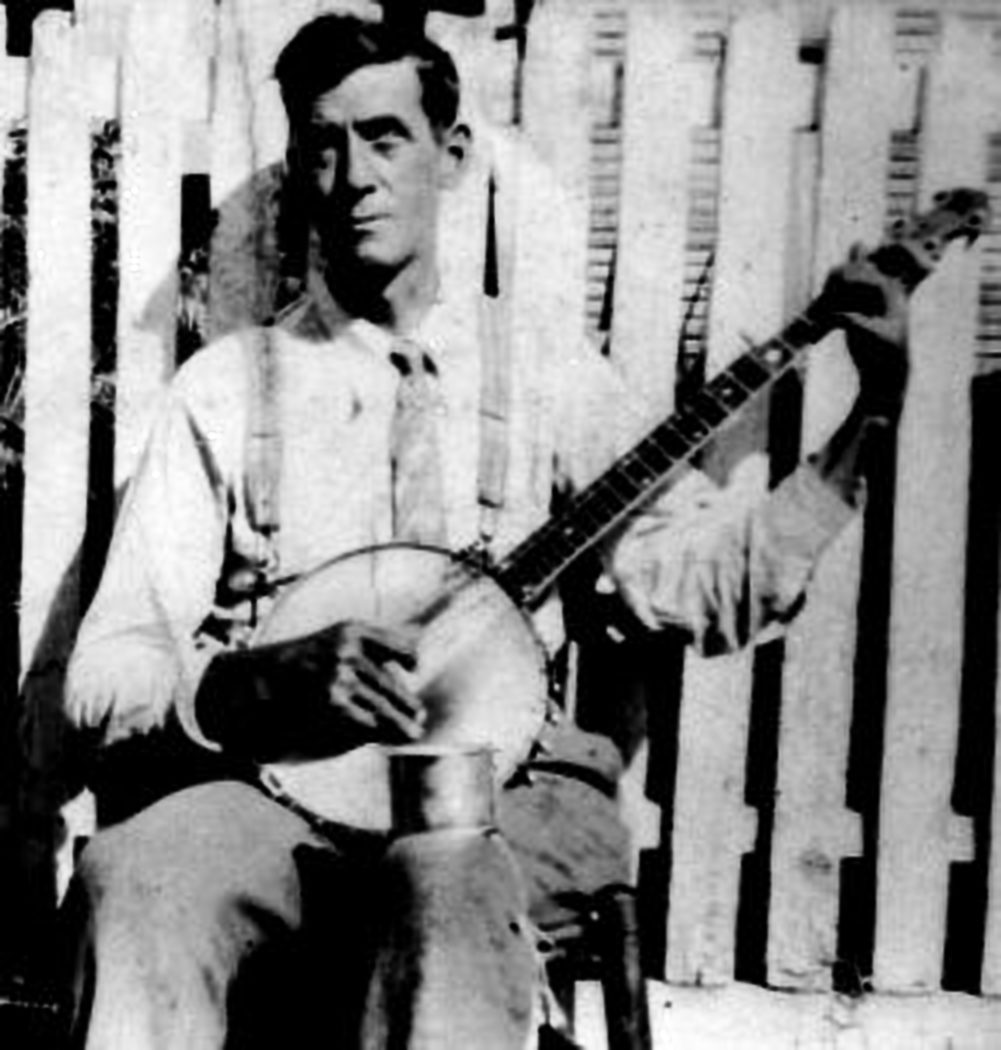
- Dick Burnett with banjo and beggar's cup

Background information
- Birth name: Richard Daniel Burnett
- Born: October 8, 1883; Monticello, Kentucky, United States
- Died: January 23, 1977 (aged 93)
- Genres: Folk
- Occupation(s): Musician, songwriter
- Instrument(s): Fiddle, banjo, Appalachian dulcimer, guitar
- Labels: Columbia

Richard Daniel Burnett (October 8, 1883 – January 23, 1977) was an American folk musician and songwriter from Kentucky.

Burnett was born near Monticello, Kentucky. Blind for most of his life, he was a full-time travelling entertainer. With fiddler Leonard Rutherford, he formed a long touring partnership and a brief recording career in which they sang a number of popular and influential sides with Burnett on banjo or guitar.

Burnett has been described as "one of the great natural songsters, a man who collected, codified, and transmitted some of our best traditional songs. Dick was also a skilful composer and folk poet of considerable skill; his "Man of Constant Sorrow" remains one of the most evocative country songs."

== Early life ==
Burnett was born in the area around the head of Elk Springs about seven miles north of Monticello. He remembered little of his farming parents. His father died when he was only four and his mother died when he was 12. Burnett did say that his mother told him how his father would carry him in his arms when he was only four years old, and he would help his dad sing. Burnett's grandparents were of German and English descent and that particular ancestral influence would be instrumental in forming Burnett's musical career. At the age of seven, Burnett was playing the dulcimer; at nine, he was playing the banjo, and at 13, he had learned to play the fiddle. Unusually for the time, he also learned the guitar, which was still a novelty in that area.

As a teenager, then as a married man with a child, Dick Burnett worked extensively as a wheat thresher, logger, oil driller and oilfield tool fitter. Then in 1907, he sustained a gunshot explosion in his face while fighting off a mugger. Surgeons were unable to save his eyesight, so he resorted to supporting his family and himself by his music. Almost prophetically, his boss made this statement to Burnett: "Well, you can still make it; you can make it with your music.

Musicians in Wayne County could elicit small change from audiences drawn from people frequenting or passing through the Monticello Courthouse Square. To earn a proper income, Dick was forced to travel to as many different places as he could reach by train or on foot. At other courthouses, at rail stations, and on street corners, he would perform to attract a crowd. While other street musicians might place a hat on the ground, he accepted contributions in a tin cup tied to his leg.

Even before he lost his sight, he had sought to enlarge his repertoire by composing his own songs. He felt that he had "learned the rudiments of music" by virtue of attending five singing schools and studying one book "up to where I could compose my own songs, set the music to it, and time it out". With this confidence, he composed more and more songs, which increased his earning power in two ways; they added novelty to his performance, and he could earn extra by selling the lyrics. For the most part, he had individual song lyrics printed on cards he called "ballets", but occasionally he compiled songbooks such as his 1913 compilation of six songs. Some of these were from other singers, dealing with disasters such as the sinking of the Titanic and the wreck of the FFV, but two were notably personal: the autobiographical "Song of the Orphan Boy", which was later recorded but not released, and the semiautobiographical "Farewell Song", with its opening line "I am a man of constant sorrow". Burnett himself never recorded the song, but his friend Emry Arthur learned it and recorded it accompanied by his brother Henry using the opening line as title. The Arthur family lived in Wayne County not far from Monticello, and shared many songs with Burnett. He recalled learning one song from a ballet card from a third brother, Sam. He acquired more ballets by exchanges with other blind musicians he met on his travels. Having learned the tune by listening, he would have the lyrics read to him until he had learned the whole song.

To add further variety to his increasingly rich repertoire, Dick Burnett purchased novelty gadgets that made nonmusical noises. These sounds, together with shouts and dance calls, added an element of extrovert showmanship to his performances, which he described as "monkey business".

== Burnett and Rutherford ==
Around 1914, Burnett proposed to solve the problem of travelling as a blind man by employing teenaged Leonard Rutherford as sighted companion. Their first trip together was to the nearby Laurel County Fair, then young Leonard spent more and more time with the older man, becoming a permanent companion when his parents died. Burnett was not his only music teacher; he learned from other South Kentucky fiddlers, including the African American Cuje Bertram. Playing with Dick made him a professional musician, though, and from him he learned the old style of playing in unison with the banjo. As his fiddling improved, ranging further afield by horse, bus, and railroad became profitable. Eventually, Burnett bought a car, which Rutherford learned to drive, thus allowing them to travel, in Burnett's words, "from Cincinnati to Chattanooga" playing "every town this side of Nashville".

They traveled by bus, Model A, and on foot to any place they could perform. From about 1914 until 1950, the pair became so popular that they found themselves in the company of most all the popular mountain musicians of the time. They were "at home" in the presence of the Carter Family, Charlie Oaks, Arthur Smith, and many others. They appeared at the Renfro Valley Barn Dance, on radio stations in Cincinnati, and finally, they were some of the first old-time musicians to enter the recording studios. One particularly profitable area for them was the coal fields of Virginia. In Bonny Blue Coal Camp, Virginia, in 1926, they encountered a general-store owner specializing in phonograph records, who recommended them to Columbia Records.

In 1926, the country-music sector of the recording industry was on the point of expansion. Columbia Records had started its dedicated 3500-D series 1924 for the Old Familiar Tunes country market, without many authentic Southern performers, but Columbia had some success with groups such as the north Georgia Skillet Lickers, the Virginia Blue Ridge Highballers, and the band of North Carolina's Charlie Poole. Columbia's A&R manager, Frank Walker, was prepared to record more southern musicians, and invited Burnett and Rutherford to a "field recording" session in November at a temporary studio in Atlanta. At this first session, Burnett and Rutherford recorded six sides, which were issued in 1927 as three 78 rpm records, which sold very well. Country-music historian Charles Wolfe considers that the success of these records encouraged Frank Walker to shift Columbia's emphasis from studio singers such as Vernon Dalhart to authentic southern artists. The bestseller of the three with "Lost John" on the A-side sold 37,600 copies in three years, an astonishing figure for that market at the time. Profitable as the records were for Columbia, Dick and Leonard received only $60 per side plus their expenses. Dick Burnett did find a way to profit from their records. He bought many copies wholesale from Columbia and sold them at his performances, just as he had previously sold his ballets and songbooks.

Burnett and Rutherford were invited to the Columbia's next Atlanta sessions in April and November 1927. The 10 numbers included Dick's autobiographical "Song of the Orphan Boy", which was not issued, a record with two sides of dance tunes without a vocal (enlivened by Dick's "monkey business" in the form of kazoo and jew's harp imitations), and a version of "Hesitation Blues" backed by Dick's adaptation of the well-known "Danville Girl". Another blues song, "All Night Long", was backed by the ballad "Wilie Moore", which was reissued on the influential 1952 Harry Smith Anthology of American Folk Music, thus introducing Burnett and Rutherford to the new market of the American folk-music revival.

The next year, dissatisfied with their payment, they broke from Columbia and recorded with Gennett Records. This involved travel to the northern recording studio, but Gennett's base in Richmond, Indiana, was more accessible from Kentucky than those of other northern record companies. Newly partnered with guitarist Byrd Moore, they recorded five sides in October 1928. One of these was rejected, so a take of "Cumberland Gap" was issued with a reverse recorded by Burnett and Moore with another fiddler, Charles Taylor.

=== Recording details ===
Click on a label to change the sorting.

Session	Title	Issue	Vocalist	Burnett	Rutherford	Moore	Notes
1926/11	"Lost John"	Co 15122-D	Leonard	guitar	fiddle	—	
1926/11	"Little Streams of Whiskey"	Co 15133-D	Leonard (lead), Dick	guitar	fiddle	—	
1926/11	"Weeping Willow Tree"	Co 15113-D	Dick, Leonard	guitar	fiddle	—	= Bury Me Under The Weeping Willow by Carter Family and others
1926/11	"I'll Be with You When the Roses Bloom Again"	Co 15122-D	Dick, Leonard	guitar	fiddle	—	
1926/11	"A Short Life of Trouble"	Co 15133-D	Dick	banjo	fiddle	—	popularized later by Blue Sky Boys, Flatt and Scruggs, and Doc Watson
1926/11	"Pearl Bryan"	Co 15113-D	Dick	guitar	fiddle	—	favorite Kentucky ballad
1927/04	"My Sweetheart in Tennessee"	Co 15187-D	Dick	guitar	fiddle	—	
1927/04	"Are You Happy or Lonesome"	Co 15187-D	Dick, Leonard	banjo	fiddle	—	
1927/04	"Assassination of J.B. Marcum"	unissued				—	
1927/04	"Song of the Orphan Girl"	unissued				—	miswriting of "Song of the Orphan Boy" in Dick's 1913 songbook
1927/11	"Curley Headed Woman"	Co 15240-D	Dick	banjo	fiddle	—	= "Hesitation Blues"
1927/11	"Ramblin' Reckless Hobo"	Co 15240-D	Leonard (lead), Dick	banjo	fiddle	—	in Dick's 1913 songbook; partly = "Danville Girl"
1927/11	"Willie Moore"	Co 15314-D	Dick	banjo	fiddle	—	reissued on Anthology of American Folk Music
1927/11	"All Night Long Blues"	Co 15314-D	Dick	guitar	fiddle	—	
1927/11	"Ladies on the Steamboat"	Co 15209-D	none	banjo	fiddle	—	sound effects and speech by Dick
1927/11	"Billy in the Low Ground"	Co 15209-D	none	banjo	fiddle	—	sound effects and speech by Dick
1928/10	"She Is a Flower from the Fields of Alabama"	Ge 6688	Dick	banjo	fiddle	guitar	
1928/10	"Under the Pale Moonlight"	Ge 6688	Leonard	banjo	fiddle	guitar	
1928/10	"The Spring Roses"	rejected	?	?	?	?	
1928/10	"Cumberland Gap"	6706	Dick	banjo	fiddle	guitar	
1928/10	"Sleeping Lula"	rejected	?	?	?	?	
1928/10	"Grandma's Rag"	6706	none	banjo	—	guitar	Charles Taylor fiddle
