= Alcoa Quartet =

The Alcoa Quartet was a Southern gospel singing group best known for recording at the Bristol Sessions in 1927.

Unlike most of the rural performers who recorded at the recording sessions set up by Ralph Peer for the Victor Talking Machine Company in 1927, the Alcoa Quartet were a slick professional singing group from Alcoa, Tennessee made up of the brothers J.E and J.H. Thomas as well as W.B. Hitch and John Wells, who were already well known as professional musicians who performed at state fairs, revival meetings and conventions as well as on the radio. Like some of the other Bristol performers they had already recorded as well. Their repertoire was mostly religious in nature like "I'm Redeemed" and are a good example of a vocal tradition that had been popular since Victorian times. They would go on to a long career performing on radio as well as later backing the young Roy Acuff among others, becoming an inspiration to future quartets like The Blackwood Brothers, The Jordanaires, The Oak Ridge Boys and The Statler Brothers who would record a version of "I'm Redeemed".
