= The Red Fox Chasers =

- Origin: Union Grove Township, Iredell County, North Carolina, U.S.
- Genres: String, gospel
- Years active: 1927–1931
- Labels: Gennett Records; County Records
- Past members: A. P. Thompson; Bob Cranford; Paul Miles; Guy Brooks

The Red Fox Chasers were a string band that formed in North Carolina in 1927, and were active until around 1931. Members included vocalist and guitar player A. P. Thompson, vocalist and harmonica player Bob Cranford, vocalist and banjo player Paul Miles, and fiddler Guy Brooks.

== History ==
The Red Fox Chasers were formed at the 1927 Union Grove Fiddler's Convention in Western North Carolina. A.P. “Fonzie” Thompson and Bob Cranford had already been singing partners, as they grew up together in Surry County, North Carolina. Both had learned the rudiments of harmony by attending church singing schools in the area, where they learned to sing from seven shape note songbooks. Both also sang in local Gospel quartets. In their spare time, they had also adapted old traditional songs, like those by Katy Cline, to their duet style. Paul Miles and Guy Brooks also grew up together, playing for square dances in nearby Alleghany County. Miles learned to play banjo at age five, using a homemade instrument crafted from a meal sifter and a groundhog hide.

When the band formed in Union Grove, Paul Miles seemed to have taken the lead of the group. It was he who devised the name "Red Fox Chasers", and it was he who arranged for their first recordings for Gennett Records in April 1928. The success of records like "Did You Ever See a Devil Uncle Joe?" got the group several more offers to record in the next few years, and they eventually amassed a total of 48 sides. These included several hits that were to remain influential for years: "Stolen Love", "Goodbye Little Bonnie", "Little Darling Pal of Mine", "Honeysuckle Time", "Sweet Fern" and "Pretty Polly". One of their original songs, "Wreck on the Mountain Road", was based on a true incident and was one of the first “wreck on the highway” genre songs in country music.

Cranford and Thompson also recorded a number of mountain gospel favorites for the same company. The Gennett Company routinely leased many of its sides to specialty labels, like those run by Sears Roebuck and Montgomery Ward. Some of The Red Fox Chasers’ biggest sellers came out under other names, such as the Virginia Possum Tamers and the Black Mountain Gang.

After the band broke up in the 1930s, all the members continued to stay active in music. Paul Miles recorded for the Library of Congress in the late 1930s, and A.P. Thompson continued to teach at singing schools and sang with local quartets. In 1967, County Records issued an LP retrospective of the band's best work.
