= Alfred Karnes =

American gospel musician (1891–1958)

Alfred Grant Karnes (February 2, 1891 – May 18, 1958) was an old time musician and Southern Gospel singer best known for his recordings at the Bristol Sessions in 1927.

== Biography ==
Born in Bedford County, Virginia, later residing in Corbin, Kentucky, Karnes was a Baptist preacher and gospel singer. In 1927, he drove to Bristol, Tennessee in response to advertisements put out by Ralph Peer looking for local artists to record on Victor Records. Karnes recorded six sides at the sessions, all gospel, accompanied by his own harp-guitar with the best known including "Bound For The Promised Land", "To The Work" and "Where We'll Never Grow Old". Karnes' records sold well enough for him to record seven more sides for Victor. After that Karnes made no further recordings and returned to the pulpit in Corbin for the rest of his life until he died in 1958. He is buried in McHargue Cemetery, Lily, Laurel County, Kentucky.

== Musical style ==
Alfred Karnes played the harp-guitar, a seldom recorded instrument from the Edwardian Era. The harp-guitar had a large guitar body with an extra set of strings above the main fretboard which were unfretted. These were struck along with the regular guitar strings to produce the effect of two separate guitarists. Karnes accented this effect by playing the fretted strings with a distinctive slapping effect. As a preacher he sang with a loud, clear, stentorian baritone which complemented his playing. His songs were exclusively gospel and were a mixture of traditional hymns and originals. Karnes' records are unique in being the only known use of the harp-guitar in Old Time Music and which had largely been seen as a novelty instrument of limited appeal being both difficult to play and unwieldy to hold.

== Recording with other artists ==
When Karnes drove down to Bristol he took with him B.F. Shelton, a friend who sang and played banjo and would also record at the sessions. Shelton was a barber in Corbin and had previously served time in a jail where Karnes had preached. However while they had occasionally performed together in Corbin they did not record together. Karnes and possibly Shelton are believed to have recorded behind gospel singer Ernest Phipps on his Bristol session sides. Phipps was also a singing preacher from Corbin, although Phipps was of a different denomination being a Pentecostal preacher, so Karnes should have been familiar with the same songs.
