= B. F. Shelton =

American singer and banjoist (1902–1963)

- Born: Benjamin Frank Shelton; January 1, 1902; Clay County, Kentucky, United States
- Died: February 28, 1963 (aged 61) Whitley County, Kentucky, United States
- Genres: Folk
- Occupation: Musician
- Instruments: Vocals, banjo, harmonica, guitar
- Years active: 1927–1928
- Label: Victor Records

Benjamin Frank Shelton (January 1, 1902 – February 28, 1963) was an American singer and banjoist who recorded a number of songs for Victor Records at the Bristol sessions in Bristol, Tennessee on July 29, 1927. Shelton traveled from Corbin, Kentucky where he worked as a barber to Bristol for the sessions with gospel singer and preacher Alfred Karnes. Four of the recordings survive today, "Darling Cora", "Pretty Polly", "Oh Molly Dear" and "Cold Penitentiary Blues". He recorded again, under the name Frank Shelton, for Columbia Records at the Johnson City sessions in Johnson City, Tennessee in October 1928, but the recordings were not issued and have not survived.

Shelton was born in Clay County, Kentucky and died in Whitley County, Kentucky.
