= Pretty Polly (ballad) =

Traditional song

"Pretty Polly", "The Gosport Tragedy" or "The Cruel Ship's Carpenter" (Roud 15, Laws P36) is a traditional English-language folk song found in the British Isles, Canada, and the Appalachian region of North America, among other places.

The song is a murder ballad, telling of a young woman lured into the forest where she is killed and buried in a shallow grave. Many variants of the story have the villain as a ship's carpenter who promises to marry Polly but murders her when she becomes pregnant. When he goes back to sea, either he is haunted by her ghost, confesses to the murder, goes mad and dies, or the ship will not sail. He denies the murder and is ripped to pieces by her ghost.

"The Gosport Tragedy" evolved into "The Cruel Ship's Carpenter" and "Pretty Polly", losing many of the specifics of the original.

== "The Gosport Tragedy" ==
There are a number of extant broadside copies of "The Gosport Tragedy", the earliest known version. It is a lengthy ballad composed of rhymed couplets, sixteen verses of eight lines each. A copy at the Lewis Walpole Library has an estimated date of 1760 to 1765. In "The Gosport Tragedy: Story of a Ballad", D.C. Fowler argued that the events described in the song may have taken place in 1726. The ship, identified as the Bedford, often "lay at Portsmouth" as in the song. Fowler found evidence that a ship's carpenter on the Bedford by the name of John Billson died at sea on 25 September 1726, and that there was a Charles Stewart among the crew members at the time, as noted in some versions. The tragic protagonist, "Molly", does not seem to have been buried at the Parish Church of St. Mary's Alverstoke, the presumed "Gosford Church", as claimed in the song. Although hardly conclusive, a number of subsequent commentators have regarded Fowler's scenario as plausible.

First printed in about 1727, the ballad tells the tale of Billson's murder of his pregnant girlfriend and his flight aboard the ship MMS Bedford. According to the story, a haunting turn occurred when a ghost confronted seaman Charles Stewart in the dark hold of the ship with a baby in her arms. When questioned by Captain Edmund Hook "the real villain saw the ghost of his lover before him, fell to his knees, and confessed to the ghastly crime. He later died aboard ship, presumably of scurvy."

== Later revisions ==
In the nineteenth century, considerably shortened and altered broadside versions began appearing under a wide range of titles including "Love and Murder", "The Cruel Ship's Carpenter", "Polly's Love", "The Cruel Ship-Carpenter", "Nancy's Ghost", "Molly the Betray'd" and "The Fog-bound Vessel". The protagonist frequently appears as "Polly" (though not "pretty Polly") and the locale is often given as Worcester, although the names of Molly and Gosport appear in some, and there is little doubt of the connection with the "Gosport Tragedy".

== Modern use ==
In the United States, the song had gained new life as a banjo tune by the time of its earliest recordings in the mid-1920s: John Hammond's "Purty Polly" of 1925 and 1927, and the "Pretty Polly" versions of B. F. Shelton and Dock Boggs, both of 1927.

American versions of the song, such as those of B.F. Shelton and Dock Boggs, tend to begin in the first person ("I courted Pretty Polly...") and switch to the third person for the murder ("he stabbed her to the heart"); Jean Ritchie's 1963 recording as well as Judy Collins' 1968 recording featured alternating verses switching back and forth between Polly and Willie's perspectives. American versions also tend to either omit the reason for killing Pretty Polly or portray him as a spurned suitor, and Willie's subsequent madness, debt to the devil, or haunting by Polly's ghost, with the remorseful killer instead turning himself in and confessing to the police.

The ballad is the musical basis for "Ballad of Hollis Brown" by Bob Dylan who played "Pretty Polly" himself in his early years.

Woody Guthrie used the tune of "Pretty Polly" for "Pastures of Plenty".

David Lindley's version alters the ending and has Polly draw a razor and kill Willie instead.

The South African-Congolese bluegrass/kwassa kwassa crossover band Congo Cowboys released a version of the song in 2020.

== Notable artists who have performed ballad versions ==
- Judy Collins ("Pretty Polly")
- Peter Bellamy ("The Ghost Song")
- Jon Boden ("The Ghost Song")
- Jackie Oates ("The Cruel Ship's Carpenter")
- Jon Raven ("Love and Murder")
- Mike Waterson ("The Cruel Ship's Carpenter")
- Waterson-Carthy ("Polly's Love")

== Notable artists who have performed "Pretty Polly" ==
- Aoife O'Donovan
- B. F. Shelton
- Bela Fleck & Abigail Washburn
- Bert Jansch
- Bill Frisell
- Bill Keith & Jim Rooney
- Bob Dylan
- Burl Ives
- Chris Jones
- The Coon Creek Girls
- Current 93
- Davey Graham
- David "Stringbean" Akeman
- David Lindley
- Dock Boggs
- Dr. Dog
- Estil C. Ball
- Gilbert O'Sullivan
- Gráda
- Hobart Smith
- Jean Ritchie
- John Fahey
- John Pearse
- Judy Collins
- Kevin Spacey (in House of Cards)
- Kristin Hersh
- Morgan Sexton
- Lee Sexton
- Mick Harris & Martyn Bates
- Patty Loveless
- Pete Seeger
- Queenadreena
- Ralph Stanley
- Sam Amidon
- Sandy Denny
- Shirley Collins
- Sturgill Simpson
- Sweeney's Men
- The Byrds
- The Dillards
- The Kruger Brothers
- The Red Fox Chasers
- The Sadies
- The Stanley Brothers
- The String Cheese Incident
- Vandaveer
- Yonder Mountain String Band
