= Leonard Rutherford =

- Born: 22 March 1898; Somerset, Kentucky, U.S.
- Died: 30 June 1951 (aged 53) Monticello, Kentucky, U.S.
- Genres: Old-time, Folk
- Occupations: Fiddler, Musician
- Instruments: Fiddle
- Years active: 1914–1950

Leonard Rutherford (March 22, 1898 – June 30, 1951) was an American old-time fiddle player from Kentucky, United States. He was a full-time live-entertainer and recording artist, but lacking any inclination for showmanship he performed in partnerships. For 35 years, he toured with banjoist Dick Burnett, making a number of highly regarded recordings in 1926–1928. He formed a shorter recording partnership (1929 -1934) with guitarist and singer John D Foster, but continued to play with Burnett. Rutherford was born in Somerset, Kentucky, and lived most of his life in Monticello, Kentucky.

Rutherford has been described as "one of the prettiest of old-time fiddlers, and he could sing, too" and "a versatile, long bow fiddler with an exceptionally sweet tone and a repertoire that included modern songs and tunes, as well as old-time tunes". Dick Burnett's verdict was more mixed: "He could play that fiddle, he was the best in the world, but he wouldn't do nothin' else. You've got to have showmanship." Wayne Martin a North Carolina Folklorist believes that due to the way Rutherford plays with very fluid sliding notes that Rutherford was influenced by the black musicians of Wayne County, KY

== Burnett and Rutherford ==
When Leonard was a boy, the Rutherford family moved from Somerset to Monticello, the home of blind professional touring musician Dick Burnett. In 1914, when Rutherford was 14 and Burnett 31 (date and ages approximate), the older man asked for the teenager to accompany him as a sighted assistant to the nearby Lauren County Fair. Thereafter, Rutherford accompanied Burnett on more (and more distant) trips, becoming a permanent companion after the deaths of his parents. A multi-instrumentalist, Burnett taught young Leonard to play the fiddle, while he played banjo and sometimes guitar himself. As Rutherford improved, it became profitable to range further afield by horse, bus, and railroad. Eventually, Burnett bought a car, which Rutherford learned to drive, thus allowing them to travel in Burnett's words, "from Cincinnati to Chattanooga" playing "every town this side of Nashville".

In Bonny Blue Coal Camp, Virginia, they encountered a general-store owner specializing in phonograph records, who recommended them to Columbia Records. The A&R manager Frank Walker was impressed by their sound and repertoire, exclaiming, "I've had a heap of people recording for me here, but you two fellers are the two smoothest musicians that I ever had record for me." and, "You have some of the tantalizingest names for these records that I ever listened at." Six sides were recorded in 1926 and issued in the Columbia 1500-D Familiar Tunes Series. They sold well, encouraging Walker to concentrate more on native Southern artists. Burnett and Rutherford were invited to record six months later and again after another six months. The records are notable for the precise unison melodic line of Rutherford's fiddle and Burnett's banjo or guitar. One of the songs, the ballad "Willie Moore", was included in the 1952 Anthology of American Folk Music, introducing Burnett and Rutherford to the new market of the American folk-music revival.

In 1928, after a dispute over royalties, Burnett and Rutherford left Columbia to record four sides for Gennett, with the addition of the guitarist Byrd Moore.

== Rutherford and Foster ==
From 1929, Burnett and Rutherford each recorded with other artists. Charles Wolfe speculates that Rutherford's free lifestyle may have created fatherlike disapproval and tension. His new partner, John D Foster, claimed later that Gennett had considered Burnett and Moore too "harsh" an accompaniment to Rutherford's smooth fiddle. What is known as fact is that in 1928 Rutherford made a number of sides with Moore alone accompanying, and that all but one were rejected or unissued.

In 1929, Foster was summoned to meet Rutherford at Somerset. After intensive practice of their shared repertoire, a recording partnership was formed, which lasted for almost two years. Rutherford and Foster recorded five sessions for Gennett in 1929–1930. One of their sides, "Six Months Ain't Long", was half of the biggest-selling old-time record of the time, but all the sides from their last two sessions were rejected, possibly because of a dispute with the musicians' manager.

Rutherford and Foster recorded for Brunswick in 1930, but broke up because of Leonard's epileptic fits. Despite his condition, he continued to perform with Dick Burnett until 1950 when he was too ill to continue.

Leonard Rutherford died on June 30, 1951, and was buried in Somerset Cemetery.
