= Jimmie Rodgers discography =

Country singer discography

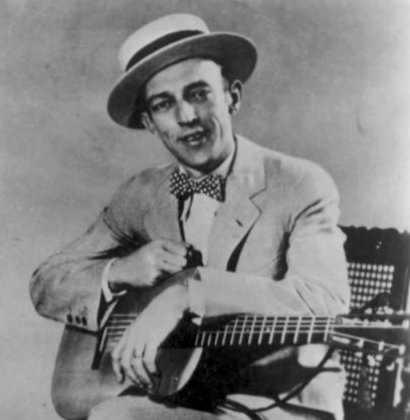
- Rodgers in 1929
- EPs: 11
- Compilation albums: 72
- Singles: 57
- Music videos: 1

The discography of Jimmie Rodgers is composed of 111 songs that spanned the blues, jazz and country music genres. His first recording was made on August 4, 1927, during the Bristol sessions. The sessions were organized by Ralph Peer, who became Rodgers' main producer with the Victor Talking Machine Company.At the height of his career in 1929, Rodgers earned US $75,000 (equivalent to US$1,406,300 in 2025) in royalties from the sale of his records. After the Great Depression, his sales dropped to US$60,000 (equivalent to US$1,125,000 in 2025). Rodgers last recording session took place in New York City on May 24, 1933. He died two nights later at the Taft Hotel, after years of suffering from tuberculosis.

Music historian Norm Cohen categorized Rodgers' discography in four different types of songs: nineteenth century songs, songs stemming from vaudeville and minstrel shows, traditional songs, and his thirteen Blue Yodels. Rodgers was known as "America's Blue Yodeler" for his signature use of yodeling. Additional to his recordings, he appeared on Columbia Pictures' short The Singing Brakeman. Two versions by different directors were shot, one in 1929 and the second one, the following year. Rodgers was given writing credits on the labels of eighty-nine releases, though he did not compose most of his songs. He was aided by his sister-in-law Elsie McWilliams, who wrote thirty-nine of the songs. Other songs by Rodgers consisted of already existing numbers that originated from traditional, blues or vaudeville show sources. Rodgers modified the tune, lyrics and interpretation "beyond recognition" to create material that his producer, Ralph Peer, could copyright. He added his signature guitar playing and yodeling. Though McWilliams did not desire credits or financial gain for her contributions, and clarified she did it to help Rodgers and the family, the song publisher added her name to the song credits. McWilliams received US$50 (equivalent to US$900 in 2025) for each song, and with her permission some of her writing credits were omitted. Other usual collaborators of Rodgers included Raymond Hall and Waldo O'Neal.

Rodgers' music directly influenced two generations of musicians including Gene Autry, Roy Rogers, Eddy Arnold, Johnny Cash, Bob Dylan, and George Harrison. Rodgers was elected into the Country Music Hall of Fame with the inaugural class in 1961, to the Songwriters Hall of Fame with the inaugural class in 1970, and to the Rock and Roll Hall of Fame with the inaugural class in 1986 as an "Early Blues Influence".

== Recordings ==
Song title	Recording number	Recording date	Recording location	Release date	Recording notes
The Soldiers Sweetheart	39767-4	Aug 4, 1927	Bristol, Tennessee	Oct 4, 1927	First recording session; Vocals, guitar
Sleep Baby Sleep	39768-3	Aug 4, 1927	Bristol, Tennessee	Oct 4, 1927	First recording session; Vocals, guitar
Ben Dewberry's Final Run	40751-2	Nov 30, 1927	Camden, New Jersey	April 6, 1928	Vocals, guitar; written by Andy Jenkins
Mother Was A Lady (If Brother Jack Were Here)	40752-2	Nov 30, 1927	Camden, New Jersey	Aug 3, 1928	Vocals, guitar. The record had to be re-issued after a lawsuit by Joseph Stern and Edward B. Marks for the title, and crediting authorship to Rodgers.
Blue Yodel (T For Texas)	40753-2	Nov 30, 1927	Camden, New Jersey	Feb 3, 1928	Rodgers' most popular recording, sold over a million copies. Vocals, guitar.
Away Out On The Mountain	40754-2	Nov 30, 1927	Camden, New Jersey	Feb 3, 1928	Vocals, guitar
Dear Old Sunny South By The Sea	41736-2	Feb 14, 1928	Camden, New Jersey	Oct 5, 1928	Vocals, guitar with The Three Southerners
Treasures Untold	41737-2	Feb 14, 1928	Camden, New Jersey	Aug 3, 1928	Vocals, guitar
Brakeman's Blues (Yodeling The Blues Away)	41738-2	Feb 14, 1928	Camden, New Jersey	May 4, 1928	Vocals, guitar, ukulele
Sailors Plea	41739-2	Feb 14, 1928	Camden, New Jersey	April 19, 1929	With the Three Southeners; co-written McWilliams
In The Jailhouse Now	41740-2	Feb 15, 1928	Camden, New Jersey	April 6, 1928	Vocals, guitar, banjo
Blue Yodel 2 (Lovin' Gal Lucille)	41741-2	Feb 15, 1928	Camden, New Jersey	May 4, 1928	Vocals, guitars
Memphis Yodel	41742-2	Feb 15, 1928	Camden, New Jersey	Nov 2, 1928	Singing and yodeling with guitar
Blue Yodel 3 (Evening Sun Yodel)	41743-2	Feb 15, 1928	Camden, New Jersey	Sept 7, 1928	Vocals, guitar
My Old Pal	45090-2	June 12, 1928	Camden, New Jersey	Dec 2, 1928	Singing with guitar, co-written with McWilliams
Mississippi Moon (Early Version)	45091-2	June 12, 1928	Camden, New Jersey	Feb 4, 1932	Vocals, guitar
My Little Home Down In New Orleans	45093-2	June 12, 1928	Camden, New Jersey	Oct 5, 1928	Vocals, guitar
You And My Old Guitar	45094-2	June 12, 1928	Camden, New Jersey	June 7, 1929	Co-written with McWilliams, singing and yodeling with guitar
Daddy And Home	45095-2	June 12, 1928	Camden, New Jersey	Dec 2, 1928	Singing with guitar, co-written with McWilliams
My Little Lady	45096-2	June 12, 1928	Camden, New Jersey	June 7, 1929	Co-written with McWilliams, singing and yodeling with guitar
Lullaby Yodel	45098-2	June 12, 1928	Camden, New Jersey	Nov 2, 1928	Co-written with McWilliams, singing and yodeling with guitar
Never No Mo’ Blues	45099-3	June 12, 1928	Camden, New Jersey	Sept 7, 1928	Co-written with McWilliams, singing and yodeling with guitar
My Carolina Sunshine Girl	47215-3	Oct 20, 1928	Atlanta, Georgia	Aug 22, 1929	Singing and yodeling with orchestra
Blue Yodel 4 (California Blues)	47216-4	Oct 20, 1928	Atlanta, Georgia	Feb 8, 1929	Singing with orchestra
Waiting For A Train	47223-4	Oct 22, 1928	Atlanta, Georgia	Feb 8, 1929	Singing with orchestra. Second best-selling song by Rodgers, with 365,0000 copies sold.
I'm Lonely And Blue	47224-5	Oct 22, 1928	Atlanta, Georgia	April 19, 1929	Singing with orchestra, co-written with McWilliams
Desert Blues	48384-3	Feb 21, 1929	New York City, New York	Aug 22, 1929	Singing and yodeling with orchestra
Any Old Time	48385-2	Feb 21, 1929	New York City, New York	Sept 5, 1930	Singing with guitar and orchestra.
Blue Yodel 5 (It's Raining Here)	49990-2	Feb 23, 1929	New York City, New York	Sept 20, 1929	Singing with yodeling and guitar
High Powered Mama	49991-3	Feb 23, 1929	New York City, New York	Oct 17, 1930	Singing with guitar
I'm Sorry We Met	49992-2	Feb 23, 1929	New York City, New York	Sept 20, 1929	Singing with yodeling and guitar
Everybody Does It In Hawaii	55307-2	Aug 8, 1929	Dallas, Texas	Nov 22, 1929	Singing with guitar. Co-written with McWilliams
Tuck Away My Lonesome Blues	55308-3	Aug 8, 1929	Dallas, Texas	Jan 3, 1930	Co-written with McWilliams and Joe Kaipo. Singing with guitar, whistling by Robert MacGimsey
Train Whistle Blues	55309-2	Aug 8, 1929	Dallas, Texas	June 5, 1930	Singing with guitar
Jimmie's Texas Blues	55332-2	Aug 10, 1929	Dallas, Texas	June 5, 1930	Singing with guitar
Frankie And Johnny	55333-2	Aug 10, 1929	Dallas, Texas	Nov 22, 1929	Singing with guitar
Home Call	55445-3	Aug 10, 1929	Dallas, Texas	Aug 12, 1929	Co-Written with McWilliams. Singing with guitar
Whisper Your Mother's Name	56449-4	Oct 22, 1929	Dallas, Texas	April 4, 1930	Singing with guitar
The Land Of My Boyhood Dreams	56450-4	Oct 22, 1929	Dallas, Texas	July 14, 1933	Singing with guitar
Blue Yodel 6 (She Left Me This Morning)	56453-3	Oct 22, 1929	Dallas, Texas	Feb 21, 1930	Singing with guitar
Yodeling Cowboy	56454-3	Oct 22, 1929	Dallas, Texas	Feb 21, 1930	Co-Written with McWilliams. Singing with guitar
My Rough And Rowdy Ways	56455-3	Oct 22, 1929	Dallas, Texas	Jan 3, 1930	Singing with guitar. Co-written with McWilliams
I've Ranged I've Roamed And I've Travelled	56456-3	Oct 22, 1929	Dallas, Texas	April 10, 1935	Co-Written with McWilliams. Singing with guitar
Hobo Bill's Last Ride	56528-3	Nov 13, 1929	New Orleans, Louisiana	Aug 1, 1930	Written by Waldo Lafayette O'Neal. Singing with yodeling and guitar
Mississippi River Blues	56594-4	Nov 25, 1929	Atlanta, Georgia	April 24, 1931	Singing with guitar
Nobody Knows But Me	56595-4	Nov 25, 1929	Atlanta, Georgia	March 13, 1931	Co-Written with McWilliams. Singing with guitar
Blue Yodel 7 (Anniversary Yodel)	56607-3	Nov 26, 1929	Atlanta, Georgia	Sept 5, 1930	Co-Written with McWilliams. Singing with guitar
She Was Happy Till She Met You	56608-3	Nov 26, 1929	Atlanta, Georgia	July 1, 1932	Co-Written with McWilliams. Singing with guitar
Blue Yodel 11 (I've Got A Gal)	56617-4	Nov 27, 1929	Atlanta, Georgia	June 30, 1933	Singing with guitar
Drunkards Child	56618-3	Nov 28, 1929	Atlanta, Georgia	April 4, 1930	Singing with guitar, co-written with Andrew Jenkins
That's Why I'm Blue	56619-3	Nov 28, 1929	Atlanta, Georgia	Aug 1, 1930	Co-Written with McWilliams. Singing and yodeling with guitar
Why Did You Give Me Your Love	56620-4	Nov 28, 1929	Atlanta, Georgia	April 10, 1935	Singing with guitar
My Blue Eyed Jane	54849-3	June 30, 1930	Hollywood, California	June 5, 1931	Singing with orchestra. Co-written with Mrs. Lulu Belle White
Why Should I Be Lonely	54850-3	June 30, 1930	Hollywood, California	Dec 4, 1931	Co-written with Estelle Lovell. Singing with Hawaiian guitars
Moonlight And Skies	54851-3	June 30, 1930	Hollywood, California	Oct 23, 1931	Co-written with Raymond E. Hill. Singing with orchestra
Pistol Packin' Papa	54852-2	July 1, 1930	Hollywood, California	Dec 5, 1930	Co-written with Waldo O'neal. Singing with guitar
Take Me Back Again	54854-3	July 2, 1930	Hollywood, California	May 25, 1938	Co-written with Raymond E. Hill. Singing with the Lani McIntire's Hawaiians
Those Gambler's Blues	54855-3	July 5, 1930	Hollywood, California	Dec 5, 1930	Singing with guitar
I'm Lonesome Too	54856-3	July 7, 1930	Hollywood, California	July 17, 1931	Singing with Hawaiian orchestra
The One Rose	54857-3	July 7, 1930	Hollywood, California	Dec 1, 1937	Written by Del Lyon, McIntire. Singing with McIntire's Hawaiians
For The Sake Of Days Gone By	54860-2	July 9, 1930	Hollywood, California	April 8, 1932	Co-written with Jack White. Singing with Hawaiian guitar
Jimmie's Mean Mama Blues	54861-3	July 10, 1930	Hollywood, California	Feb 6, 1931	Singing with orchestra. Written by Walter O'Neal, Bob Sawyer
Mystery Of Number 5	54862-3	July 11, 1930	Hollywood, California	March 13, 1931	Singing with guitar
Blue Yodel 8 (Muleskinner Blues)	54863-3	July 11, 1930	Hollywood, California	Feb 6, 1931	Singing with guitar
In The Jailhouse Now 2	54864-3	July 12, 1930	Hollywood, California	Oct 17, 1930	Singing with guitar
Blue Yodel 9 (Standin' On The Corner)	54867-3	July 16, 1930	Hollywood, California	Sept 11, 1931	Singing with orchestra. Uncredited appearances by Louis Armstrong (trumpet) and Lil Hardin Armstrong (piano).
Pullmans Porters	1302-1	July 16, 1930	Hollywood, California	Sept 11, 1931	
T.B. Blues	67133-3	Jan 31, 1931	San Antonio, Texas	April 24, 1931	Singuing with guitar. Co-written by R. Hall
Travellin' Blues	67134-3	Jan 31, 1931	San Antonio, Texas	July 17, 1931	Singing with orchestra. Co-written with Shelly Lee Alley
Jimmie The Kid	67135-3	Jan 31, 1931	San Antonio, Texas	June 5, 1931	Singing with guitars and string bass. Co-written with Neville
Rodger's Puzzle Record	67135-3	Jan 31, 1931	San Antonio, Texas	Dec 31, 1931	Contains three songs. Studio edit joining "Train Whistle Blues", "Blue Yodel" and "Everybody Does it in Hawaii"
Why There's A Tear In My Eye	69412-3	June 10, 1931	Louisville, Kentucky	Nov 23, 1936	Recorded with Sara Carter. Singing with guitar
The Wonderful City	69413-3	June 10, 1931	Louisville, Kentucky	Feb 17, 1937	Co-written with McWilliams. With Sara Carter, singing with guitars
Let Me Be Your Side Track	69424-4	June 11, 1931	Louisville, Kentucky	Dec 31, 1931	Singing with guitar
Rodgers Visits The Carter Family	69427-1	June 12, 1931	Louisville, Kentucky	Oct 23, 1931	Assisted by the Carter Family. Singing with Mandolin and guitar
The Carter Family Visit Rodgers In Texas	67428-1	June 12, 1931	Louisville, Kentucky	Jan 20, 1937	With the Carter Family. Singing with guitars
Cactus Is In Bloom	69432-3	June 13, 1931	Louisville, Kentucky	Feb 26, 1932	Singing with guitar
Gambling Polka Dot Blues	69439-3	June 15, 1931	Louisville, Kentucky	Feb 26, 1932	Co-written with R. Hall. Singing with piano
Looking For A New Mama	69443-3	June 15, 1931	Louisville, Kentucky	Sept, 11, 1931	Singing with guitars
What's it?	69448-4	June 16, 1931	Louisville, Kentucky	Dec 4, 1931	Co-written with J. Neville. Singing with piano
My Good Gals Gone	69449-3	June 16, 1931	Louisville, Kentucky	May 22, 1935	Singing with Louisville Jug Band
Southern Cannonball	69458-4	June 17, 1931	Louisville, Kentucky	July 14, 1933	Co-written with McWilliams. Singing with guitar
Roll Along Kentucky Moon	70645-2	Feb 2, 1932	Dallas, Texas	April 8, 1932	Written by Halley. Singing with Hawaiian guitars
Hobos Meditation	70646-2	Feb 3, 1932	Dallas, Texas	Sep 23, 1932	Singing with guitars and string bass
My Time Ain't Long	70647-2	Feb 4, 1932	Dallas, Texas	May 20, 1932	Co-written with Waldo O'Neal. Singing with guitars, ukulele and string bass
Ninety-Nine Year Blues	70648-2	Feb 4, 1932	Dallas, Texas	May 20, 1932	Co-written with Hall. Singing with guitars and string bass
Mississippi Moon (Later Version)	45091-2	Feb 4, 1932	Dallas, Texas	Aug 12, 1932	Co-Written with McWilliams. Singing with guitar
Down The Old Road To Home	70649-2	Feb 5, 1932	Dallas, Texas	Sep 23, 1932	Co-written with Carey D. Harvey. Singing with guitars
Blue Yodel 10 (Ground Hog Rootin' In My Backyard)	70650-2	Feb 6, 1932	Dallas, Texas	Aug 12, 1932	Singing with guitars
Home Call (1932)	55345-2	Feb 6, 1932	Dallas, Texas	July 1, 1932	Co-Written with McWilliams. Singing with guitar
Mother Queen Of My Heart	58961-2	Aug 11, 1932	Camden, New Jersey	Oct 21, 1932	Co-written with Hoyt Bryant. Singing with violin, banjo and guitar
Rock All Our Babies To Sleep	58963-2	Aug 11, 1932	Camden, New Jersey	Oct 21, 1932	Arranged by Rodgers. Singing with violin, banjo and guitar
Whippin' That Old T.B.	58964-2	Aug 11, 1932	Camden, New Jersey	Jan 13, 1933	Singing with violin, banjo and guitars
No Hard Times	58968-3	Aug 15, 1932	Camden, New Jersey	Jan 13, 1933	Singing with violin, banjo and guitars
Long Tall Mama Blues	58969-1	Aug 15, 1932	Camden, New Jersey	Feb 24, 1933	Singing with banjo and guitars
Peach Picking Time In Georgia	58970-2	Aug 15, 1932	Camden, New Jersey	April 7, 1933	Co-written with C. McMichen. Singing with banjo and guitar
Gambling Barroom Blues	58971-3	Aug 15, 1932	Camden, New Jersey	Feb 24, 1933	Co-written with Shelly Lee Alley. Singing with fiddle, banjo and guitar.
I've Only Loved Three Women	58972-1	Aug 15, 1932	Camden, New Jersey	Feb 17, 1937	Co-written with Harvey. With violin, banjo and guitar
In The Hills Of Tennessee	73324-2	Aug 29, 1932	New York City, New York	Dec 2, 1932	Sam M. Hills, Ira Schuster. Singing with orchestra
Prairie Lullaby	73325-2	Aug 29, 1932	New York City, New York	April 7, 1933	Co-written with George Brown. Singing with violins, guitar, clarinet and piano
Miss The Mississippi And You	73326-2	Aug 29, 1932	New York City, New York	Dec 2, 1932	Written by Bill Halley. Singing with orchestra
Sweet Mama Hurry Home	73327-2	Aug 29, 1932	New York City, New York	June 30, 1933	Singing with guitar, violin, clarinet and piano
Blue Yodel 12 (Barefoot Blues)	76138-1	May 17, 1933	New York City, New York	June 27, 1933	Singing with guitars
Dreaming With Tears In My Eye	76139-1	May 17, 1933	New York City, New York	May 25, 1938	Co-written with Waldo O'Neal. Singing with guitar.
The Cowhand's Last Ride	76140-1	May 17, 1933	New York City, New York	June 27, 1933	Co-written with Arza Hitt Singing with guitar
I'm Free From The Chain Gang Now	76141-1	May 17, 1933	New York City, New York	Sep 8, 1933	Written by Lou Herscher. Singing with guitar
Yodeling My Way Back Home	76151-2	May 18, 1933	New York City, New York	Dec 1, 1937	Singing with guitars
Jimmie Rodgers' Last Blue Yodel (The Women Make A Fool Out Of Me)	76160-1	May 18, 1933	New York City, New York	Dec 20, 1933	Singing with guitars
The Yodeling Ranger	76191-2	May 20, 1933	New York City, New York	Sept 8, 1933	Co-written with Raymond Hall, singing with guitar
Old Pal Of My Heart	76192-2	May 20, 1933	New York City, New York	July 28, 1933	Co-written with Joe B. Mason. Singing with guitar
Old Love Letters	76327-1	May 24, 1933	New York City, New York	Oct 20, 1933	Co-written with Herscher and Butcher. Singing with guitars
Mississippi Delta Blues	76328-2	May 24, 1933	New York City, New York	July 28, 1933	Co-written with Jack Neville
Somewhere Down Below The Dixson Line	76331-2	May 24, 1933	New York City, New York	Oct 20, 1933	Co-written with Ryan. Singing with guitar
Years Ago	76332-2	May 24, 1933	New York City, New York	Dec 20, 1933	Singing with guitar. Co-written with Herscher, Richards

== Unreleased recordings ==
Song	Label	Recording location	Recording date
"The Sailors Plea" (Alternate Take)	Victor Unissued	Camden, New Jersey	Feb 14, 1928
"Mississippi Moon" (Alternate Take)	Victor Unissued	Camden, New Jersey	June 12, 1928
"I'm Lonely and Blue" (Alternate Take)	Victor Unissued	Camden, New Jersey	June 12, 1928
"Any Old Time" (Alternate Take)	Victor Unissued	New York City, New York	Feb 21, 1929
"High Powered Mama" (Alternate Take)	Victor Unissued	New York City, New York	Feb 23, 1929
"Frankie and Johnny" (Alternate Take 1)	Victor Unissued	Dallas, Texas	Aug 10, 1929
"Frankie and Johnny" (Alternate Take 2)	Victor Unissued	Dallas, Texas	Aug 12, 1929
"Home Call" (Alternate take 1)	Victor Unissued	Dallas, Texas	Aug 12, 1929
"Home Call" (Alternate take 2)	Victor Unissued	Dallas, Texas	Aug 12, 1929
"Whisper Your Mothers Name" (Alternate Take 1)	Victor Unissued	Dallas, Texas	Oct 22, 1929
"Whisper Your Mothers Name" (Alternate Take 2)	Victor Unissued	Dallas, Texas	Oct 22, 1929
"The Land of My Boyhood Dreams" (Alternate Take 1)	Victor Unissued	Dallas, Texas	Oct 22, 1929
"The Land of My Boyhood Dreams" (Alternate Take 2)	Victor Unissued	Dallas, Texas	Oct 22, 1929
"The Land of My Boyhood Dreams" (Alternate Take 3)	Victor Unissued	Dallas, Texas	Oct 22, 1929
"Blue Yodel 6" (Alternate Take 1)	Victor Unissued	Dallas, Texas	Oct 22, 1929
"Blue Yodel 6" (Alternate Take 2)	Victor Unissued	Dallas, Texas	Oct 22, 1929
"Yodeling Cowboy" (Alternate Take)	Victor Unissued	Dallas, Texas	Oct 22, 1929
"My Rough and Rowdy Ways" (Alternate Take 1)	Victor Unissued	Dallas, Texas	Oct 22, 1929
"My Rough and Rowdy Ways" (Alternate Take 2)	Victor Unissued	Dallas, Texas	Oct 22, 1929
"I've Ranged, I've Roamed, and I've Travelled" (Alternate Take 1)	Victor Unissued	Dallas, Texas	Oct 22, 1929
"I've Ranged, I've Roamed, and I've Travelled" (Alternate Take 2)	Victor Unissued	Dallas, Texas	Oct 22, 1929
"Mississippi River Blues" (Alternate Take)	Victor Unissued	Atlanta, Georgia	Nov 13, 1929
"Blue Yodel 7" (Alternate Take)	Victor Unissued	Atlanta, Georgia	Nov 26, 1929
"She was Happy Till She Met You" (Alternate Take)	Victor Unissued	Atlanta, Georgia	Nov 26, 1929
"Blue Yodel 11" (Alternate Take)	Victor Unissued	Atlanta, Georgia	Nov 27, 1929
"Why Did You Give Me Your Love?" (Alternate Take)	Victor Unissued	Atlanta, Georgia	Nov 28, 1929
"My Blue Eyed Jane" (Alternate Take)	Victor Unissued	Hollywood, California	June 30, 1930
"Moonlight and Skies" (Alternate Take)	Victor Unissued	Hollywood, California	June 30, 1930
"Take Me Back Again" (Alternate Take)	Victor Unissued	Hollywood, California	July 2, 1930
"Those Gambler's Blues" (Alternate Take)	Victor Unissued	Hollywood, California	July 5, 1930
"I'm Lonesome Too" (Alternate Take)	Victor Unissued	Hollywood, California	July 7, 1930
"For the Sake of Days Gone by" (Alternate Take)	Victor Unissued	Hollywood, California	July 8, 1930
"T.B. Blues" (Alternate Take)	Victor Unissued	Hollywood, California	July 11, 1930
"Travellin' Blues" (Alternate Take 1)	Victor Unissued	San Antonio, Texas	Jan 31, 1931
"Travellin' Blues" (Alternate Take 2)	Victor Unissued	San Antonio, Texas	Jan 31, 1931
"Jimmie The Kid" (Alternate Take)	Victor Unissued	San Antonio, Texas	Jan 31, 1931
"Why There's A Tear in My Eye" (Alternate Take)	Victor Unissued	Louisville, Kentucky	June 10, 1931
"Let Me Be Your Sidetrack" (Alternate Take 1)	Victor Unissued	Louisville, Kentucky	June 11, 1931
"Let Me Be Your Sidetrack" (Alternate Take 2)	Victor Unissued	Louisville, Kentucky	June 11, 1931
"When The Cactus is in Bloom" (Alternate Take)	Victor Unissued	Louisville, Kentucky	June 15, 1931
"Gambling Polka Dot Blues" (Alternate Take 1)	Victor Unissued	Louisville, Kentucky	June 15, 1931
"Gambling Polka Dot Blues" (Alternate Take 2)	Victor Unissued	Louisville, Kentucky	June 15, 1931
:"Looking For A New Mama" (Alternate Take)	Victor Unissued	Louisville, Kentucky	June 15, 1931
"What's It?" (Alternate Take)	Victor Unissued	Louisville, Kentucky	June 16, 1931
"My Good Gal's Gone Blues" (Alternate Take)	Victor Unissued	Louisville, Kentucky	June 16, 1931
"Southern Cannonball" (Alternate Take)	Victor Unissued	Louisville, Kentucky	June 17, 1931
"Jimmie Rodgers' Puzzle Record" (Alternate Pressing)	Victor Unissued	Camden, New Jersey	Oct 27, 1931
"Roll Along Kentucky Moon" (Alternate Take)	Victor Unissued	Dallas, Texas	Feb 2, 1932
"Hobo's Meditation" (Alternate Take)	Victor Unissued	Dallas, Texas	Feb 3, 1932
"My Time Ain't Long" (Alternate Take 1)	Victor Unissued	Dallas, Texas	Feb 4, 1932
"My Time Ain't Long" (Alternate Take 2)	Victor Unissued	Dallas, Texas	Feb 4, 1932
"Mississippi Moon (Later Version)" (Alternate Take)	Victor Unissued	Dallas, Texas	Feb 5, 1932
"In The Hills of Tennessee" (Alternate Take)	Victor Unissued	Camden, New Jersey	Aug 10, 1932
"Prohibition Has Done Me Wrong" (Unreleased)	Victor Unissued	Camden, New Jersey	Aug 11, 1932
"Whippin' That Old T.B." (Alternate Take)	Victor Unissued	Camden, New Jersey	Aug 11, 1932
"No Hard Times" (Alternate Take)	Victor Unissued	Camden, New Jersey	Aug 15, 1932
"Dreaming With Tears in My Eyes" (Alternate Take)	Victor Unissued	New York City, New York	May 18, 1933

== Overdubbed recordings ==
Song title	Label	Year	Notes
In The Jailhouse Now No. 2 (Overdubbed Version)	RCA	1955	Overdubbed by The Rainbow Ranch Boys
Blue Yodel 8 (Muleskinner Blues) (Overdubbed Version)	RCA	1955	Overdubbed by The Rainbow Ranch Boys
Peach Pickin' Time In Georgia (Overdubbed Version)	RCA	1955	Overdubbed by The Rainbow Ranch Boys
Mother, Queen Of My Heart (Overdubbed Version)	RCA	1955	Overdubbed by The Rainbow Ranch Boys
Never No Mo' Blues (Overdubbed Version)	RCA	1955	Overdubbed by The Rainbow Ranch Boys
Blue Yodel (T For Texas) (Overdubbed Version)	RCA	1955	Overdubbed by The Rainbow Ranch Boys
Daddy And Home (Overdubbed Version)	RCA	1955	Overdubbed by The Rainbow Ranch Boys
Memphis Yodel (Overdubbed Version)	RCA	1955	Overdubbed by The Rainbow Ranch Boys

== Filmography ==
Year	Director	Film	Studio	Note
1930	Jasper Ewing Brady	The Singing Brakeman	Columbia Pictures	Both Recordings were recorded on the same day, October 30, 1929. Just had different directors. Released within a month of each other. the Basil Smith Recording is the more popular one.
1930	Basil Smith	The Singing Brakeman	Columbia Pictures	Both Recordings were recorded on the same day, October 30, 1929. Just had different directors. Released within a month of each other. the Basil Smith Recording is the more popular one.
