= 1929 in country music =

This is a list of notable events in country music that took place in the year 1929.

== Events ==
- December – Release in the United States of short film The Singing Brakeman starring country singer Jimmie Rodgers.

== Top Hillbilly (Country) Recordings ==
The following songs were extracted from records included in Joel Whitburn's Pop Memories 1890-1954, record sales reported on the "Discography of American Historical Recordings" website, and other sources as specified. Numerical rankings are approximate, they are only used as a frame of reference.

| Rank | Artist | Title | Label | Recorded | Released | Chart Positions |
|---|---|---|---|---|---|---|
| 1 | Carter Family | "Wildwood Flower" | Victor 40000 | May 10, 1928 | January 10, 1929 | US BB 1928 #23, US Hillbilly 1929 #1, US #3 for 1 week, 10 total weeks, 1,000,000 sales, National Recording Registry 2006 |
| 2 | Jimmie Rodgers | "Waiting For A Train" | Victor 40014 | October 22, 1928 | February 8, 1929 | US BB 1929 #168, US #14 for 1 week, 3 total weeks, US Hillbilly 1929 #2, 1,000,000 sales |
| 3 | Jimmie Rodgers | "My Carolina Sunshine Girl" | Victor 40096 | October 20, 1928 | August 22, 1929 | US Hillbilly 1929 #3, 1,000,000 sales |
| 4 | Carter Family | "I'm Thinking To-night Of My Blue Eyes" | Victor 40089 | February 14, 1929 | June 11, 1929 | US BB 1929 #116, US #10 for 1 week, 4 total weeks, US Hillbilly 1929 #4 |
| 5 | Ernest Phipps and His Holiness Singers | "If The Light Has Gone Out In Your Soul" | Victor 40010 | October 29, 1928 | March 22, 1929 | US Hillbilly 1929 #5, 11,376 sales |
| 6 | Jimmie Rodgers | "My Old Pal" / "Daddy and Home" | Victor 21757 | June 12, 1928 | January 1929 | US Hillbilly 1929 #6, 1,000,000 sales |
| 7 | Charlie McCoy and Bo Chatman | "Corrine, Corrina" | Brunswick 7080 | November 1928 | August 1929 | US Hillbilly 1929 #7 |
| 8 | Al Craver (aka Vernon Dalhart) | "Farm Relief Song" | Columbia 15449-D | August 22, 1929 | October 1929 | US BB 1929 #77, US #7 for 1 week, 4 total weeks, US Hillbilly 1929 #8 |
| 9 | Jimmie Rodgers | "You and My Old Guitar" / "My Little Lady" | Victor 40072 | June 12, 1928 | June 7, 1929 | US Hillbilly 1929 #9, 1,000,000 sales |
| 10 | Jimmie Rodgers | "Frankie and Johnnie" / "Everybody Does It in Hawaii" | Victor 22143 | August 10, 1929 | November 22, 1929 | US Hillbilly 1929 #10 |
| 11 | Blind Willie McTell | "Statesboro Blues" | Victor 38001 | October 17, 1928 | January 4, 1929 | US Hillbilly 1929 #11, National Recording Registry 2015 |
| 12 | Jimmie Rodgers | "I’m Lonely and Blue" / "The Sailor’s Plea" | Victor 40054 | February 14, 1928 | April 19, 1929 | US Hillbilly 1929 #12, 236,231 sales |
| 13 | Tom Darby and Jimmie Tarlton | "Slow Wicked Blues" | Columbia 15419 | April 15, 1929 | May 31, 1929 | US Hillbilly 1929 #13 |
| 14 | Carolina Tar Heels | "Peg And Awl" | Victor 40010 | May 24, 1930 | August 1930 | US Hillbilly 1929 #14 |
| 15 | Jimmie Rodgers | "Blue Yodel No. 5 (It’s Raining Here)" / "I’m Sorry We Met" | Victor 22072 | February 23, 1929 | September 20, 1929 | US Hillbilly 1929 #15 |
| 16 | Carter Family | "Lulu Wall" | Victor 40126 | February 14, 1929 | October 24, 1929 | US Hillbilly 1929 #16 |
| 17 | Bud Billings (Frank Luther) and Carson Robison | "The Utah Trail" | Brunswick 4296 | March 1929 | August 1929 | US BB 1929 #229, US #19 for 1 week, 1 total weeks, US Hillbilly 1929 #17 |
| 18 | Eck Robertson | "There's a Brown Skin Girl Down the Road Somewhere" | Victor 40145 | August 12, 1929 | November 1929 | US Hillbilly 1929 #18 |
| 19 | Clarence Pinetop Smith | "Pinetop's Boogie Woogie" | Vocalion 1245 | December 29, 1928 | March 1929 | US Hillbilly 1929 #19 |
| 20 | Nelstone's Hawaiians | Just Because | Victor 40273 | November 30, 1929 | December 1929 | US Hillbilly 1929 #20 |

== Births ==
- January 17 – Grady Martin, session guitarist and member of Nashville's "A Team" (died 2001)
- March 13 – Jan Howard, Grand Ole Opry star. Best known for "Evil on Your Mind" (died 2020).
- March 27 – Don Warden, best known for his years on The Porter Wagoner Show and as the manager of Wagoner and Dolly Parton (died 2017).
- May 1 – Sonny James, singer of the 1950s through early 1980s who once had 16 consecutive No. 1 songs—many of them covers of pop hits—on the Billboard Hot Country Singles chart; "The Southern Gentleman". (died 2016)
- June 23 – June Carter Cash, member of the legendary Carter Family and wife of Johnny Cash (died 2003)
- July 9 – Jesse McReynolds, Grand Ole Opry star.
- August 12 – Buck Owens, key innovator of the "Bakersfield Sound," which resulted in immense popularity from the 1960s onward; co-host of Hee Haw from 1969–1986. (died 2006)

== Deaths ==
Erich Wichman Nicolas Nikolayevitch Henry Arthur Jones Heiner Muller Julio Antonio Mella H. B. Higgins Cornelis W Lely Liang Qichao
