= Waiting for a Train (Jimmie Rodgers song) =

1929 single by Jimmie Rodgers

Single by Jimmie Rodgers
- A-side: "Blue Yodel No. 4 (California Blues)"
- Released: February 8, 1929
- Recorded: October 22, 1928
- Studio: Victor studio, Atlanta
- Genre: Hillbilly (Country); Country blues
- Length: 2:45
- Label: Victor 40014
- Songwriter: Jimmie Rodgers
- Producer: Ralph Peer

Jimmie Rodgers singles chronology
""My Old Pal" / "Daddy and Home"" (1928)	"Waiting for a Train" (1929)	""I'm Lonely And Blue" / "The Sailor's Plea"" (1929)

Audio sample
- file; help

"Waiting for a Train" is a song written and recorded by Jimmie Rodgers and released by the Victor Talking Machine Company as the flipside of "Blue Yodel No. 4" in February 1929. The song originated in the nineteenth century in England. It later appeared in several song books, with variations on the lyrics throughout the years.

Rodgers, who was familiar with the tune, reworked it with producer Ralph Peer. Complementary to Rodgers' characteristic blues guitar, the recording session featured a jazz combo the singer found while visiting a bar in Atlanta, Georgia, just before the recording session.

It became one of Rodgers' most popular songs, as the Wall Street Crash of 1929 made the composition relatable to everyday life during the Great Depression. Rodgers became the best selling act of the year. Since then, "Waiting for a Train" has been recorded by several other artists. Boxcar Willie, who also sang I'll Fly Away, recorded this song.

== Origins ==
The origins of the song were traced by D. K. Wilgus, a music scholar and professor at UCLA, to a mid-nineteenth-century broadside ballad printed by Catnach Press in London, entitled "Standing on the Platform", with the subtitle "Waiting for the train". The song recounted the story of a man who met a woman at a railway station, who later falsely accused him of assaulting her. Modified versions of the ballad appeared in diverse songbooks of the era, such as Billy Newcomb's San Francisco Minstrels' Songster (1868), Billy Cottons Ethiopian Songster (1870), a sheet music published by S. Brainard Sons (1870) and Coming Through the Rye (1871). In the 1880s, a version called "Wild and Reckless Hobo" was published. In July 1909, the request of a reader for a complete version of a poem was published in the Railroad Man's Magazine. The man only knew the first two verses:

While standing on the platform, waiting for the train,
Cold and hungry, I lay down, out in the cold and rain
Thinking o'er those good old times I ne'er shall see again,
Ten thousand miles away from home, I've bummed a railroad-train.

The request was not replied to, but the magazine printed the poem as "10,000 Miles From Home" five years later in 1914. Sociologists Guy Benton Johnson and Howard W. Odum collected verses of the song during their field research of black culture in the Southern United States in the late 1910s. The composition was also traditionally known as "Danville Girl". The earliest known recording of the song was made by George Reneau as "Reckless Hobo" on February 24, 1925, and released by Aeolian-Vocalion Records. In 1929, Prince Albert Hunt released it as "Waltz of the Roses" on Okeh Records.

== Recording ==
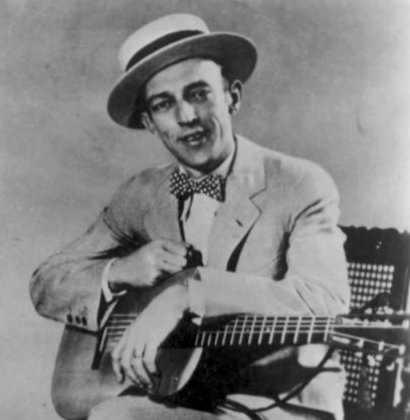
Rodgers, as seen in a Victor Talking Machine publicity portrait in 1929

Jimmie Rodgers started singing his own version of the song around early 1925. He later received a suggestion to record it in 1928. Rodgers could only remember some of the words to the song. Since he was only able to play only a few chords on the guitar, he could not use the original tune. He and producer Ralph Peer rewrote the lyrics to the song to fit Rodgers' guitar skills. The composition was at the time in the public domain, but with the changes in the lyrics and music, Peer decided he would be able to copyright it under Rodgers' name. It was written in a six-line stanza. "Waiting for a Train" told the story of a man, now turned a hobo, as he struggled to return to his home. He is found by a brakeman while riding through Texas, and thrown off of the boxcar to continue on foot. The recording introduced Rodgers' trademark train whistle. Rodgers produced the sound on the back of his throat by mixing a yodel with a whistle.

Rodgers arrived in Atlanta, Georgia, a week before his recording session for the Victor Talking Machine Company was scheduled. While experiencing the night life of the city at a speakeasy, Rodgers encountered a jazz combo composed of Dean Bryan (guitar), C. L. Hutchinson (cornet), James Rikard (clarinet), George MacMillan (bass fiddle) and John Westbrook (steel guitar). Rodgers invited the group to join him in his upcoming session after trying out some songs with their backing. In addition to Rodgers' characteristic blues guitar sound, the participation of the combo known as the Westbrook Conservatory Entertainers on "Waiting for a Train" gave the song a "jazz-flavored" sound. After the train whistle, Rodgers sang the first verse and followed with his signature yodel. Then a dixieland-style breakdown composed of cornet and clarinet joined in, with a long clarinet solo featured. Rodgers followed with his guitar, accompanied by the steel guitar, both playing in the style of a twelve-bar blues. The October 22 session took place between 9 a.m. and 1 p.m., and yielded the recordings of "Waiting for a Train" and "I'm Lonely and Blue". The recording of "Waiting for a Train" was done in four takes, with the final one being selected as the master.

It was paired with a song from a later session, "Blue Yodel No. 4", and was released on February 8, 1929, with the catalog number V-40014. It was copyrighted on March 23. On the record pressing, "Waiting for a Train" was assigned to V-40014-B. Victor added "A" and "B" at the end of the catalog number to differentiate the sides. Before the 1930s, the songs contained in a record would be referred to as "sides", and promoted together equally. The names of the compositions were published with letters of the same size and font by record companies, accompanied by the catalog number of the releases. Reviewers of the time commonly mentioned both sides of the record without focusing on a particular song.

The disk sold 365,000 copies upon its release, and became Rodgers' second-best-selling recording, behind the pairing of "Blue Yodel No. 1 (T for Texas)" / "Away Out in the Mountain". The Victor Talking Machine Company sound engineers later discovered that the strong sound of the bass fiddle on the original recording damaged the grooves as it was played. Victor re-dubbed the track, and later issues featured the bass sound cut in half.

== Reception ==
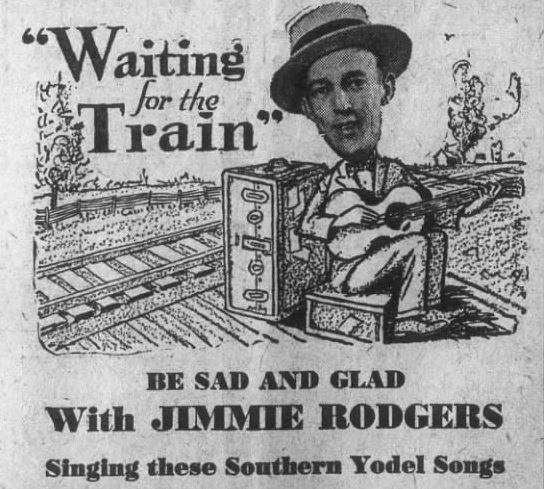
Advertising of the record, published in 1929

The composition became popular as the Wall Street Crash of 1929 in October led on to the Great Depression. The themes depicted on it became commonplace in the lives of unemployed Americans. In respect to Rodgers' role, critic Dave Marsh has pointed out: "it was Rodgers—far more than Woody Guthrie—who was the true voice of the Depression". In November 1929, Rodgers starred in the short The Singing Brakeman, by Columbia Pictures. Filmed on the Victor lot in Camden, New Jersey, the film depicted Rodgers singing in a railroad restaurant. It opened with "Waiting for a Train". Rolling Stone later considered the film to be "one of the first-ever country music videos" and remarked upon Rodgers' understanding of the importance of trains as the subject of songs in the genre.

Reviews of Rodgers' concerts that included the song at the time remarked it to be among the numbers which "proved most popular", and remarked its appeal to the audiences. Others referring to his blues guitar on the performances concluded that Rodgers "plays as entertainingly as he sings".

Rodgers became the best-selling country act of 1929. Other labels started to look for artists that sounded like him to replicate his success. Though it was at the time already considered a traditional song, Prince Albert Hunt claimed that Rodgers copied his record. "Waiting for a Train" was first covered by Ed Jake West on the American Record Corporation label, followed by Riley Puckett on Columbia Records. In May 1929, Gene Autry released his own cover of the song, with singer Frankie Marvin providing the whistle sound. His producer, Art Satherley talked to him about not recording any more Rodgers covers. Since Autry had been covering many of Rodgers' songs soon after their release, Satherley felt he was becoming an imitator. The singles sold poorly, and he advised Autry to find better material.

=== Legacy ===
Buddy Jones recorded it in 1940, and Wilf Carter in 1941. Ernest Tubb released it on Decca Records in 1948. Based on the aggregate score of 73 by operators, disk-jockeys and record dealers, Billboard deemed Tubb's version on its scale as "good".

Jimmie Rodgers' performance of "Waiting for a Train" in The Singing Brakeman (1930)

Robert Johnson's step-sister, Annye, remembered Rodgers as their favorite country singer. Johnson played "Waiting for a Train", and imitated Rodgers' yodel. Johnny Cash included it in his album Blood, Sweat and Tears. On May 10, 1962, Cash appeared at Carnegie Hall. A fan of Rodgers', Cash designed a concept show based around him. Rodgers' daughter lent him one of her fathers' costumes to wear during the appearance. Cash ordered the lights of the concert hall to be turned off, so he could be only illuminated during his entrance by a lantern that belonged to Rodgers. Following a Rodgers' signature move, Cash walked to a chair on the center of the stage, and put his knee on it. He opened with "Waiting for a Train". George Harrison cited Rodgers as one of his early influences, and credited the pairing of "Blue Yodel No. 4" and "Waiting for a Train" owned by his father as the first guitar recordings he heard. Harrison would musically quote part of "Waiting for a Train" in his track "Rocking Chair in Hawaii" on his final album Brainwashed.

Jim Reeves released it as the flip-side to his single "Am I Losing You" in 1956, and then included it in his 1962 album The Country Side of Jim Reeves. Furry Lewis re-recorded it as "Dying Hobo". It featured his own version of the yodel, and it was released on the Blue Horizon label in 1969. Merle Haggard recorded his own version for his 1969 tribute album Same Train, a Different Time. Boz Scaggs recorded it for his 1969 album. Jerry Lee Lewis released a version of it on Sun Records in 1970. Lewis started to play the song during his childhood upon request of his father, Elmo, and kept performing it as part of his frequent set numbers. On his version, he replicated Rodgers' yodel. It peaked at eleven in the Hot Country Singles chart in 1971.

== Chart performance ==
=== Jerry Lee Lewis ===
Chart (1971)	Peak position
Billboard Hot Country Singles	11

== See also ==
- List of train songs
