= Alleyton, Texas =

- Unincorporated community
- Location within Texas Location within the United States
- Coordinates: 29°42′23″N 96°29′11″W
- Country: United States
- State: Texas
- County: Colorado
- Elevation: 188 ft (57 m)
- Time zone: UTC-6 (Central (CST))
  - Summer (DST): UTC-5 (CDT)
- ZIP code: 78935
- Area code: 979

Alleyton is an unincorporated community in central Colorado County, in the U.S. state of Texas. According to the Handbook of Texas, the community had a population of 165 in 2000.

== History ==
Once the location of an ancient Indian camp, Rawson Alley established the community in 1821. His brothers Abraham, John C., Thomas V., and William A. Alley Jr. followed in 1822. William gave land for the right-of-way and the construction of stores, a roundhouse, a station, and loading facilities in 1859. He also arranged for the Buffalo Bayou, Brazos, and Colorado Railway to be extended to his property. After the town was surveyed, all of the city lots—apart from one set aside for William Alley's residence—were put up for public auction. The railroad and William Alley split the earnings of the deal evenly. When the railroad to Alleyton was finished in 1860, the town became the endpoint of the state's southernmost railroad. Alleyton became Colorado County's biggest and busiest town. In 1860, a post office was opened there. Alleyton marked the start of the "cotton road," which allowed cotton to be transported by wagon train from Texas to Mexico during the Civil War, avoiding the Union blockade of Texas ports. Military and civilian supplies were transported back by wagon trains, and they were subsequently railroaded to the other Confederate states. The Colorado River was crossed following the war, and the railroad was extended to Columbus, the county seat, and other western locations. Although Alleyton's significance as a rail hub decreased, it remained significant as the hub for supplies in a densely populated agricultural region. The village had two churches, five general stores, a drugstore, a saloon, and 200 residents as of 1890. The population was estimated to be 320 in 1896, but by 1914, it had decreased. Even until the 1940s, it stayed at 200. During the first part of the 20th century, Alleyton's main agricultural products were cotton, with minor emphasis on rice, corn, and pecans. Large-scale strip mining activities along the river that removed gravel caused the construction of numerous lakes that are famous fishing spots in the area as well as the destruction of some productive farming and grazing land. During the 1950s, Alleyton's population had dropped to about 125 due to the growing usage of synthetic clothing during the post-World War II era and more government regulation of cotton production. The town had 65 residents in 1986. There were six companies in the area, including an auto salvage yard, a welding and well-drilling service, and a few entertainment venues. Its population was recorded as 165 in 2000.

== Geography ==
Alleyton is located on the east bank of the Colorado River and Farm to Market Road 102 between Interstate 10 and the Southern Pacific Railroad's main line, 3 miles (5 km) east of Columbus in central Colorado County. It used to be on Texas State Highway 73.

== Education ==
Alleyton had its own school in 1890. Today, Alleyton is served by the Columbus Independent School District.

== Notable people ==
- Shelly Lee Alley, musician and songwriter
- Joseph J. Mansfield, member of the United States House of Representatives.
- Mose Bozier, who was lynched here on May 20, 1922, for assaulting a white woman.

== Gallery ==
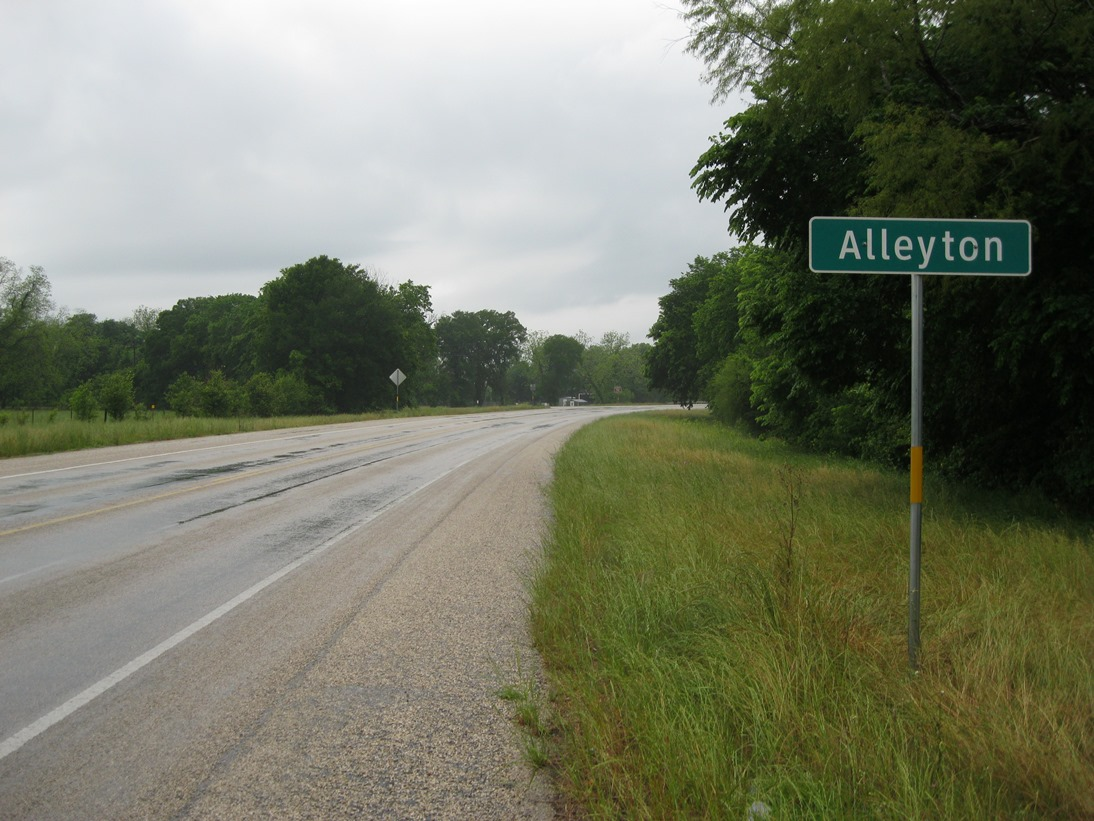
Alleyton road sign on FM 102 looking north

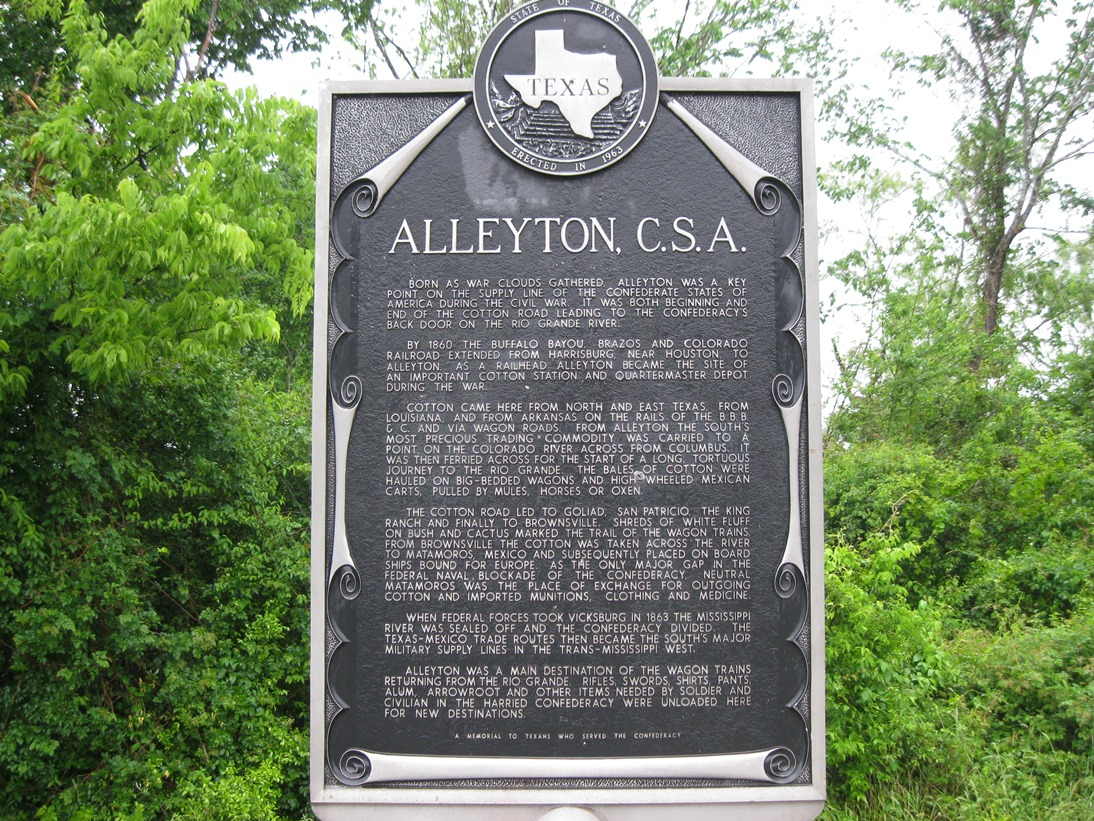
Historical marker explains the town's role in the US Civil War

== See also ==
- Farm to Market Road 949
