= Billie Maxwell =

American country music guitarist and singer (1906–1954)

Background information
- Also known as: Billie Maxwell, the Cow Girl Singer
- Born: 1906
- Died: 1954 (aged 47–48)
- Genres: Country music
- Instrument: Guitar
- Years active: 1929
- Label: Victor Records

Billie Maxwell (1906–1954) was an American guitarist and singer. She is often said to be the first woman recorded in country music, and the first recorded musician from Arizona but she was actually neither: Rosa Lee Carson, the daughter of Fiddlin' John Carson (one of the first recorded country music acts) and professionally known as 'Moonshine Kate' cut the first recorded country music records by a woman during a June, 1925 session for Okeh Records. Billie Maxwell played guitar with The White Mountain Orchestra and recorded six sides solo for the Victor Talking Machine Company in July, 1929 following the recordings made by the White Mountain Orchestra, which made her part of the first recorded country music act in Arizona, and Arizona's first recorded female country singer.

== Life ==
She was born in 1906 to Curtis Maxwell, a locally known fiddler. She grew up in Nutrioso, near Springerville, Arizona. The family worked primarily as ranchers. Her father started a folk group called The White Mountain Orchestra while Billie was a child, and they would perform around the area, often playing at dances. She joined the band as a guitarist while in her teens.

In 1929 she married A. Chesser Warner, a school teacher and continued playing with the band. Around the same time, Ralph Peer, noted recording engineer and talent scout for the Victor Talking Machine Company, was having auditions held around the southwestern U.S. to find new Victor recording artists. The White Mountain Orchestra was selected from a local audition in June 1929 to travel to El Paso, Texas, to record for him. The band went to El Paso on 2 July 1929 and recorded four songs, including Escudilla Waltz. While Peer was listening to the session, he asked Billie to sing. She recorded five songs singing solo, with guitar and violin. The first song was recorded on July 2, the remainder on July 11. The discs were published with Maxwell identified as Billie Maxwell, the Cow Girl Singer. Her songs spoke honestly of the struggles of poorer women. She continued to perform with the White Mountain Orchestra until the birth of her first child. She had two children, and died from cancer in 1954 at age 48.

== Discography ==
Victor issued three 78rpm records (six songs) by Maxwell.

Disc One:

- "Billy Venero, pt I"
- "Billy Venero, pt II"

It was issued 22 November 1929 and sold 3125 copies.

Disc Two:

- "The Arizona Girl I Left Behind Me"
- "The Cowboy's Wife"

It sold 2641 copies.

Disc Three:

- "Haunted Hunter"
- "When Your Sweetheart Waits For You, Jack"

It sold 1300 copies.

The Cowboy's Wife was re-released on the Banjo Pickin' Girls album published by Rounder. Billy Venero was re-released on When I Was A Cowboy, Vol. 2: Early American Songs of the West, Classic Recordings from the 1920s and 30s by Yazoo Records. Copies of her original Victor discs are valuable collector's items. Her work was featured in the Musical Instrument Museum's 100 Years of Arizona Music exhibit.

== Sources ==
- Ventre, Sarah (7 April 2011). "Billie Maxwell's Records Are the Oldest Made By an Arizonan – and John Dixon Wants One". Phoenix New Times. Phoenix, AZ.
- Wolfe, Charles K. (2002). Classic Country: Legends of Country Music. Routledge. ISBN 978-1135957346.
- "Billie Maxwell (vocalist)". Discography of American Historical Recordings. UC Santa Barbara Library. 2016.
- "Cowboy Music". The Arizona Experience. Arizona Centennial Commission. 2012. Archived from the original on 12 December 2015.
- "When I was a Cowboy, Vol. 2". Yazoo Records. 2000. Archived from the original on 2001-12-24.
