= Shelly Lee Alley =

American singer-songwriter

- Born: July 6, 1894; Alleyton, Texas, United States
- Origin: Dallas-Fort Worth, Texas, United States
- Died: June 1, 1964 (aged 69)
- Genres: Western swing String band
- Occupations: Singer; Songwriter; Musician; Bandleader
- Instruments: Vocals; Fiddle; Guitar; Banjo
- Label: Vocalion Records; Bluebird Records; Okeh Records
- Website: www.shellyleealley.com

Shelly Lee Alley (July 6, 1894 – June 1, 1964) was an American singer, musician, songwriter and western swing bandleader. As a songwriter, Alley wrote "Travelin' Blues" for Jimmie Rodgers, a song which has been recorded by over 20 artists, including Merle Haggard and Ernest Tubb. He is a member of the Western Swing Hall of Fame. He is considered one of Texas' best bandleaders of the 1930s and 1940s and a pioneer of western swing music.

== Early life ==
Shelly Lee Alley was born in 1894 in Alleyton, Texas. His parents were Eliza Hoover Alley and John Ross Alley. John Ross operated a cotton gin. He had a brother named Alvin. Alley began reading music when he was a child.

== Career ==
During World War I, Alley was the bandleader for a military orchestra in San Antonio, Texas. In the 1920s, he moved the Dallas-Fort Worth area and led pop and jazz dance and radio orchestras. He regularly appeared on KRLD with his bands.

While working in the Dallas-Fort Worth area, Alley met Jimmie Rodgers. Alley wrote "Gambling Barroom Blues" and "Traveling Blues" in 1931 for Rodgers. Alley recorded the latter song with Rodgers, playing fiddle alongside his brother, Alvin, on the recording. After the experience, Alley left swing music to focus on string band music. As of 1933, he had become the first leader of the Swift Jewel Cowboys. The band performed on XEPN. During this time, Alley gained interest in western swing music, a genre which merged his love for swing music and country. In 1936, he started the Alley Cats, who recorded songs for Vocalion Records, Bluebird Records and Okeh Records. Cliff Bruner, Leon Selph, Floyd Tillman and Ted Daffan were in the band.

The Alley Cats broke up during World War II. Alley performed with Patsy and the Buckaroos, a Beaumont, Texas based band. The band broke up in 1946. That same year, he retired from performing live, citing health problems as the reason. He continued to write music, writing "Broken Dreams" for Moon Mulligan and "Why Are You Blue?" for Biff Collie and Little Marge. In 1955, Alley released a single on Jet. He recorded also with Bennie Hess.

== Legacy ==
In 1994, Alley was inducted into the Western Swing Hall of Fame.
