= Blue yodel =

Song performed by Jimmie Rodgers

The blue yodel songs are a series of thirteen songs written and recorded by Jimmie Rodgers during the period from 1927 to his death in May 1933. The songs were based on the 12-bar blues format and featured Rodgers’ trademark yodel refrains. The lyrics often had a risqué quality with "a macho, slightly dangerous undertone." The original 78 issue of "Blue Yodel No. 1 (T for Texas)" sold more than a half million copies, a phenomenal number at the time. The term "blue yodel" is also sometimes used to differentiate the earlier Austrian yodeling from the American form of yodeling introduced by Rodgers.

== A folk-blues hybrid ==
Rodgers' background in the blackface minstrel shows and as a railroad worker enabled him to develop a unique musical hybridization drawing from both black and white traditions, as exemplified by the blue yodel songs. In his recordings Rodgers and his producer, Ralph Peer, achieved a "vernacular combination of blues, jazz, and traditional folk" to produce a style of music then called 'hillbilly'.

Rodgers' blue yodel songs, as well as a number of his other songs of a similar pattern, drew heavily on fragmentary and ephemeral song phrases from blues and folk traditions (called "floating lyrics" or "maverick phrases").

== Rodgers' yodel ==
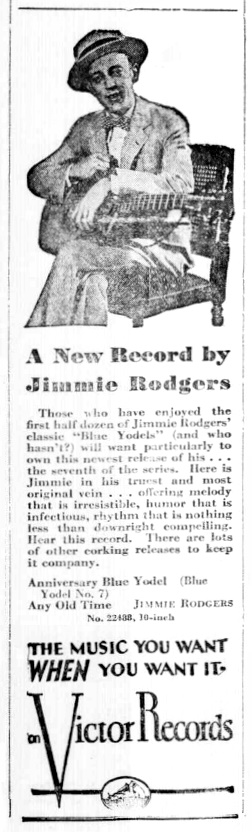
Advertisement for 'Anniversary Blue Yodel (Blue Yodel No. 7)', published in the Seward Daily Gateway (Alaska), 18 October 1930.

Rodgers' yodeling refrains are integral to the blue yodel songs. His vocal ornamentation has been described as "that famous blue yodel that defies the rational and conjecturing mind". Rodgers viewed his yodeling as little more than a vocal flourish; he described them as "curlicues I can make with my throat".

Rodgers said he saw a troupe of Swiss yodelers doing a demonstration at a church. They were touring America, and he just happened to catch it, liked it, and incorporated it into his songs.

It has been suggested that Rodgers may have been influenced by the yodeling of Emmett Miller, a minstrel singer who recorded for Okeh Records from 1924 to 1929. Singers such as Vernon Dalhart, Riley Puckett, and Gid Tanner incorporated yodeling in recordings made in the mid-1920s; Rodgers recorded a version of Riley Puckett's "Sleep, Baby, Sleep" in August 1927.

Rodgers' yodel had the "steady ease of hobo song, and was simple enough to imitate", unlike the yodeling of other contemporary performers. Rodgers' recording and performing successes in the late 1920s and early 1930s ensured that yodeling "became not only an obligatory stylistic flourish, but a commercial necessity". By the 1930s yodeling was a widespread phenomenon and had become almost synonymous with country music.

When members of Kenya's Kipsigi tribe first encountered the blue yodels in the 1940s, they attributed Rodgers' voice to a half-man, half-antelope spirit they dubbed "Chemirocha". However, this is one theory. Songs dedicated to Chemirocha came to be incorporated into their culture; one recording, recorded by ethnomusicologist Hugh Tracey, is available here.

== Blue yodel discography ==
Jimmie Rodgers’s first blue yodel, “Blue Yodel No. 1 (T for Texas) ”, was recorded on November 30, 1927, in the Trinity Baptist Church at Camden, New Jersey. When the song was released in February 1928 it became "a national phenomenon and generated an excitement and record-buying frenzy that no-one could have predicted."

- “Blue Yodel No. 1 (T for Texas)”, recorded on November 30, 1927, at Camden, New Jersey; released on February 3, 1928 (BVE 40753-2).
- “Blue Yodel No. 2 (My Lovin’ Gal, Lucille)”, recorded on February 15, 1928, at Camden, New Jersey; released on May 4, 1928 (BVE 41741-2).
- “Blue Yodel No. 3 (Evening Sun Yodel)”, recorded on February 15, 1928, at Camden, New Jersey; released on September 7, 1928 (BVE 41743-2).
- “Blue Yodel No. 4 (California Blues)”, recorded on October 20, 1928, at Atlanta, Georgia; released on February 8, 1929 (BVE 47216-4).
- “Blue Yodel No. 5 (It’s Raining Here)”, recorded on February 23, 1929, at New York, New York; released on September 20, 1929 (BVE 49990-2).
- “Blue Yodel No. 6 (She Left Me This Mornin’)”, recorded on October 22, 1929, at Dallas, Texas; released on February 21, 1930 (BVE 56453-3).
- “Anniversary Blue Yodel (Blue Yodel No. 7)”, recorded on November 26, 1929, at Atlanta, Georgia; released on September 5, 1930 (BVE 56607-3) - with Elsie McWilliams (Rodgers' sister-in-law).
- “Blue Yodel No. 8 (Mule Skinner Blues)”, recorded on July 11, 1930, at Hollywood Recording Studios, Los Angeles, California; released on February 6, 1931 (PBVE 54863-3).
- “Blue Yodel No. 9 (Standin’ On the Corner)”, recorded on July 16, 1930, at Hollywood Recording Studios, Los Angeles, California (with Louis Armstrong, trumpet, and Lil Hardin Armstrong, piano); released on September 11, 1931 (PBVE 54867-3).
- “Blue Yodel No. 10 (Ground Hog Rootin’ in My Backyard)”, recorded February 6, 1932, at Dallas, Texas; released on August 12, 1932 (BVE 70650-2).
- “Blue Yodel No. 11 (I’ve Got a Gal)”, recorded on November 27, 1929, at Atlanta, Georgia; released posthumously on June 30, 1933 (BVE 56617-4).
- “Blue Yodel No. 12 (Barefoot Blues)”, recorded on May 17, 1933, at New York, New York; released posthumously on June 27, 1933 (BS 76138-1), a month after Jimmie Rodgers’ death.
- “Jimmie Rodgers' Last Blue Yodel (The Women Make a Fool Out of Me)”, recorded on May 18, 1933, at New York, New York; released posthumously on December 20, 1933 (BS 76160-1), seven months after Jimmie Rodgers had died.

== Covers and legacy ==
- The 1930 song "Future Blues" by the bluesman Willie Brown includes the lines "And it's T for Texas, now, it's T for Tennessee."
- Bob Wills & His Texas Playboys recorded a cover of Blue Yodel #1 in 1937.
- The Everly Brothers released a version of "T for Texas" in 1968.
- In 1969, country singer Merle Haggard released Same Train, A Different Time: Merle Haggard Sings The Great Songs Of Jimmie Rodgers, which included "Blue Yodel #6", "California Blues", and "Mule Skinner Blues".
- Tompall Glaser recorded a version of "T For Texas" which was included on the 1976 compilation, Wanted! The Outlaws, country music's first million-selling album.
- The band Lynyrd Skynyrd also performed "T for Texas" on their 1976 live album, One More From the Road, in a rock and roll style with triple guitar work from the band's three guitarists.
- The 1998 song "A Country Practice" by the band Half Man Half Biscuit on their album Four Lads Who Shook the Wirral includes the lines "T for Toxteth, T for Tennessee, T for Thatcher, that girl that made a wreck out of me".
- Johnny Cash also recorded a cover of "T for Texas", which can be heard on his posthumously issued box set Unearthed.
- Bluegrass pioneer Bill Monroe covered three of the blue yodels: #3, #7, and #8. However, there has been continued confusion with his performance of "Blue Yodel #3", as his label incorrectly named it "Blue Yodel #4". Others that have copied Monroe's rendition have repeated this error, including The Country Gentlemen on their 1973 album, Yesterday & Today, Vol. 1, and The Dreadful Snakes on their 1984 album, Snakes Alive!
- Many other artists have gone on to cover Mule Skinner Blues in Monroe's style, including Dolly Parton, the Stoneman Family, Old & In the Way the Fendermen and Rhonda Vincent.
- The Del McCoury Band has covered Blue Yodel #3 in Monroe's bluegrass style.
- Blue Yodel #9 has been covered by the Jerry Garcia Acoustic Band on Almost Acoustic, Jerry Garcia and David Grisman on Been All Around This World and Steve Earle on Shut Up And Die Like An Aviator.
- Wanda Jackson covered "Blue Yodel #6" for her album The Party Ain't Over (2011).
- "T for Texas" is the first song on the Waylon Jennings album entitled Waylon Live, which is one of his most popular and highly acclaimed albums. The album was released in December 1976, but the songs were recorded in 1974, pre-dating the Lynyrd Skynyrd recording by two years.
- Karl Denver recorded "T for Texas" in a Decca Ace of Clubs album
- Townes Van Zandt recorded a cover of "T For Texas". It was released posthumously on the 2013 double album collection Sunshine Boy: The Unheard Studio Sessions & Demos 1971–1972.
- John Fogerty recorded a cover of "California Blues" (Blue Yodel #4) in his first solo album in 1973 after the break up of Creedence Clearwater Revival, "The Blue Ridge Rangers"

== See also ==
- Jimmie Rodgers discography
- List of train songs
- Blue yodeling
