= The Singing Brakeman (film) =

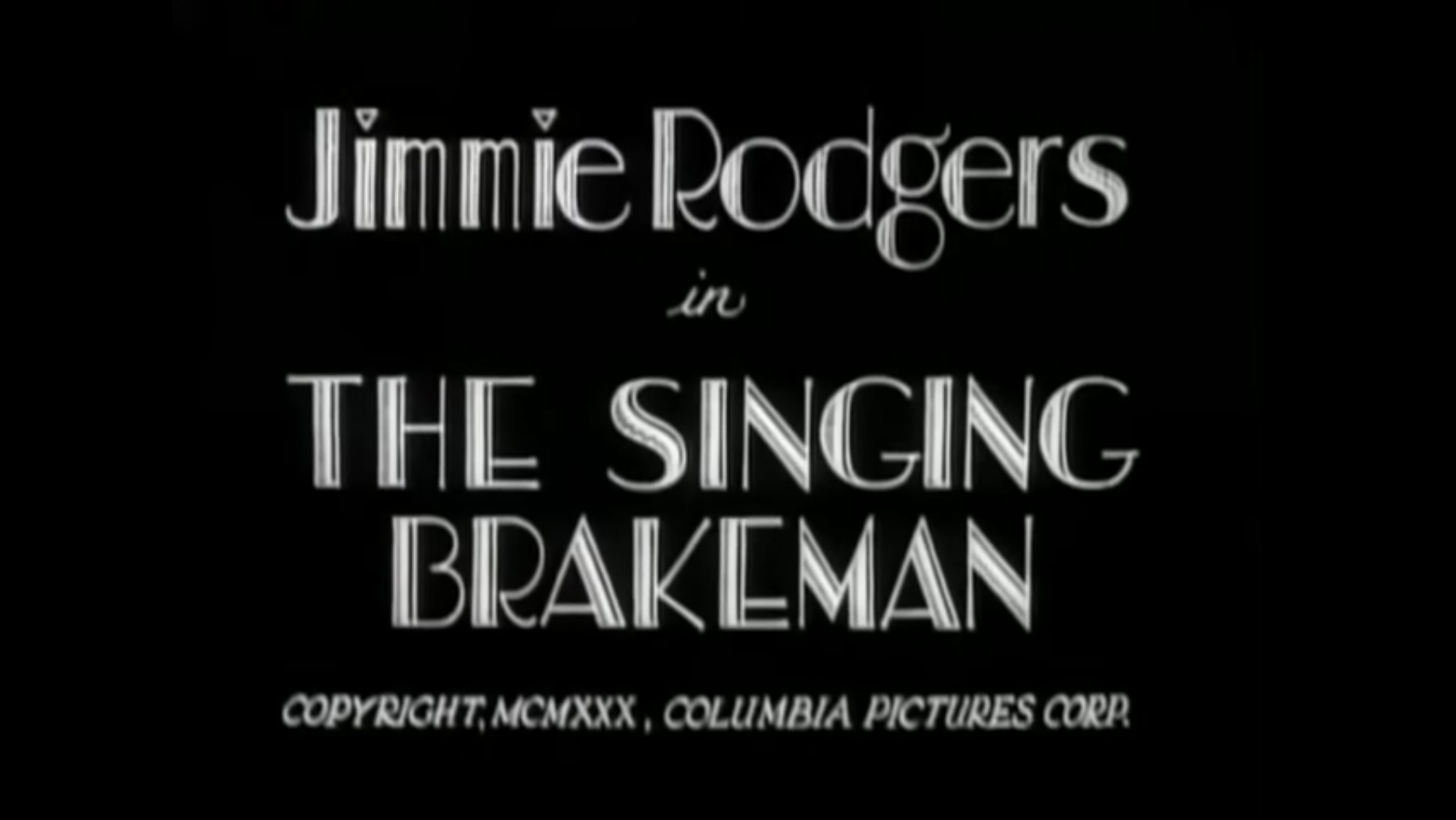
- Directed by: Jasper Ewing Brady III; Basil Smith
- Starring: Jimmie Rodgers
- Cinematography: L. D. Clawson and Frank Zukor "Frank Zucker" and Charles Harten
- Music by: Jimmie Rodgers
- Production company: Columbia-Victor Gems
- Release date: December 31, 1929
- Running time: 9 minutes
- Country: United States
- Language: English

The Singing Brakeman is a 1929 short film, starring Jimmie Rodgers, and released by Columbia Pictures and the Victor Talking Machine Company. Rodgers sings three of his songs: "Waiting for a Train", "Daddy and Home" and "Blue Yodel".

Following Rodgers' success as a recording artist by the end of 1929, the short was filmed at the studios of the Victor Talking Machine Company in Camden, New Jersey. Two versions of the film were produced and released with different credits. One of the releases contained a copyright notice of 1929, while the second one, was credited in 1930.

The Singing Brakeman, advertised as a "singing novelty" was played in theaters from December 1929 between movies and newsreels. It was well received by the critics.

== Plot ==
Following the opening credits featuring a jazz band, the film starts with a scene set in a railway station restaurant. Rodgers appears, dressed in a brakeman's uniform, and greets the waitress and an elderly woman sitting in a rocking chair. He checks the schedule for his departure, orders coffee, and the waitress requests him to sing a song. Rodgers accepts and she hands him a guitar. After his trademark train whistle, Rodgers sings "Waiting for a Train". The waitress then asks him: "Do you ever think of you ol' dad at home?" Rodgers says he does and offers to sing another song; he performs "Daddy and Home". The waitress then requests Rodgers to sing her favorite song, while he counters asking about his coffee. He starts singing "Blue Yodel". As he finishes the song, he stands up and enters the coffee shop. The film ends with the music of a jazz band.

== Background and production ==
1930 version of The Singing Brakeman

On August 4, 1927, Rodgers' songs were recorded for the first time during the Bristol sessions by producer Ralph Peer. His second session the same year produced "Blue Yodel". The song became Rodgers' first hit and propelled him to national popularity. By the end of 1929, his available recordings had sold twelve million records.

In November 1929, Rodgers traveled to the Victor Talking Machine studios in Camden, New Jersey to film a short to be released on the Columbia-Victor Gems series of short films. The songs featured Rodgers' characteristic guitar playing and yodeling. The sound recording was made by Sooy Brothers on the Western Electric system. The short is nine minutes long, and it was contained in a single movie reel. The News & Observer reported the completion of the film in December 1929.

Two versions of the film exist. The first version credited Jasper Ewing Brady as the director. L. D. Clawson and Frank Zukor were included as the cameramen. The copyright year indicated 1929 and it included Columbia Pictures' logo on the opening. The second distributed version did not feature the logo, and has slight differences in the actors' performances. Rodgers' performance had also a slight variation. The second version credited Basil Smith as the director, while the photography was credited to "Frank Zucker" and Charles Harten. The variation in the credits was attributed to either an error by Columbia Pictures, or to the use of two different directors. "The Singing Brakeman" was a nickname given to Rodgers in reference to his earlier work for different railroad companies.

An uncredited jazz band performs an excerpt of "The Memphis Blues" under the opening and closing titles. The filmmakers used the record Victor BVE-51751, a soundtrack by conductor Rosario Bourdon and the sixteen-piece Motion Picture Orchestra, created for "Beginnings and endings for Columbia Pictures".

== Release ==
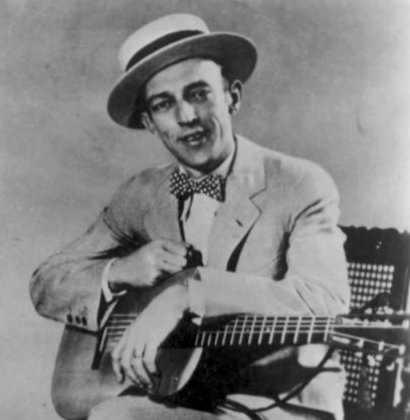
Rodgers in 1929

The Singing Brakeman was released on December 31, 1929. Motion Picture News reviewed the Jasper Ewing Brady version in November 1929: The review described the three numbers and favored the performance of "Blue Yodel", while it concluded that it was "too much the same throughout to be particularly effective". The short was being played in theaters between movies and newsreels. It was described as an "All-talking comedy", and a song novelty.

Washington Post opined that the short "might advantageously" have applied Rodgers' yodeling to "better songs". Meanwhile, to Publix Opinion the songs were "simple" and Rodgers' performance delivered them "capably" and with a "clear voice". Miami Herald expressed the opinion that the film would "have a special interest" for people in Miami as Rodgers had formerly lived there. A follow-up mentioned that the singer was "thinner" than he had been at his last appearance in Miami years before. The reviewer called the numbers his "characteristic railroad songs", and stated that the song "Daddy and Home" was "pathetically significant" to Rodgers childhood: his mother died when he was a child and the singer had been raised by his father. Meanwhile, Fort Worth Star-Telegram pointed to Rodgers' "sizable record followers", who would "like to see the short". Shreveport Journal also mentioned the singer's local fame, and his "singing ability".

The Yonkers Herald pointed out that The Singing Brakeman featured "songs that all will want to sing". The Reading Times deemed the short "entertaining" and the songs "well-balanced". The Goff Advance felt that it needed to "call the attention" of its readers to the film. It compared Rodgers favorably to other yodelers, opining that they could not "play guitar or sing so beautifully as Jimmie Rodgers". The review further called it a "sensation of a show" for a "real evening of entertainment".

=== Legacy ===
The Singing Brakeman was the first film to feature a country music artist, and is the only known footage of Rodgers performing. Rolling Stone considered it "one of the first-ever country music videos".

Both versions would later be released on home media. The 1930 version was made available on the DVD Times Ain't Like They Used to Be, published by Yazoo/Shanachie Video. The footage was remastered from an original 35 mm movie film source. The audio transfer from the 1929 version was released on the compilation Jimmie Rodgers: The Singing Brakeman by Bear Family Records.
