= Blue Yodel No. 1 (T for Texas) =

1928 single by Jimmie Rogers

"Blue Yodel"
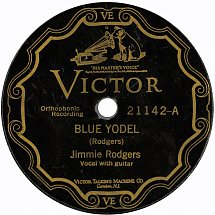

Single by Jimmie Rodgers
- B-side: "Away Out on the Mountain"
- Published: copyright February 3, 1928 Ralph Peer, New York
- Released: February 3, 1928
- Recorded: November 30, 1927
- Studio: Trinity Church Studio, Camden, New Jersey
- Genre: Hillbilly; country blues; blue yodeling
- Length: 3:27
- Label: Victor 21142
- Songwriter: Jimmie Rodgers
- Producer: Ralph Peer

"Blue Yodel No. 1 (T for Texas)" (originally "Blue Yodel", often called "Blue Yodel No. 1" or "T For Texas") is a song by American singer-songwriter Jimmie Rodgers. The recording was produced by Ralph Peer, who had originally recorded with Rodgers during the Bristol Sessions. It was released by the Victor Talking Machine Company on February 3, 1928. Rodgers recorded it during his second session with Victor, on November 30, 1927.

Rodgers composed "Blue Yodel" using his original lines, mixed with lines from other songs. The song features a traditional blues bar form, with his voice accompanied only by his guitar. It was named after the yodeling Rodgers featured during the breaks between stanzas. The song became Rodgers's best selling disk, a fixture in his live performances, and the first of his series of Blue Yodels. It garnered him national fame, and with Rodgers becoming known as "America's Blue Yodeler". Multiple artists recorded their versions of the song, which was inducted into the Grammy Hall of Fame and added to the National Recording Registry. "Blue Yodel" influenced artists including Johnny Cash, George Harrison and Ronnie Van Zant.

== Background ==
As a teenager, Rodgers sang on the traveling shows he organized with his father. During his adulthood, Rodgers began working for the New Orleans and Northeastern Railroad as a brakeman. Because of tuberculosis, he left the job in 1924. Rodgers then returned to performing, while moving around to different locations and working for other railroad companies. In February 1927, he moved to Asheville, North Carolina, where he appeared on broadcasts of the recently established radio station WWNC. Rodgers selected a group from Bristol, Tennessee, as his backing band. The station featured them weekly under the name The Jimmie Rodgers Entertainers.

Also in 1927, the Victor Talking Machine Company's producer Ralph Peer traveled to southern Appalachia to scout and record local talent, following the success of his recordings of Fiddlin' John Carson. Peer set up to record in Bristol, on the recommendation of Okeh Records engineer Ernest Stoneman. Rodgers and his band heard of Peer's sessions and scheduled a recording. After a disagreement with the band's members regarding the name to use on the record's label the night before, Rodgers decided to record a solo record. On August 4, 1927, Peer recorded him from 2:00 pm to 4:30 pm. The session produced the tracks "Sleep, Baby, Sleep" and "The Soldier's Sweetheart". The resulting disk was released in October 1927.

== Recording and composition ==
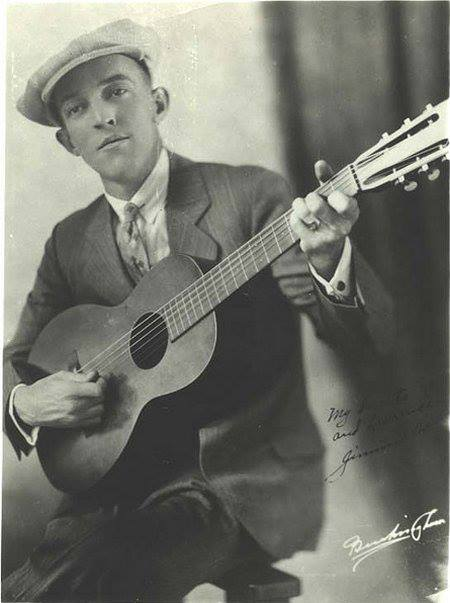
Publicity portrait used to promote Rodgers in 1927

Rodgers waited fruitlessly for Peer to call him again to have him record. He traveled to New York City and called Peer to let him know he was there and that he had time to record a few songs; Peer set up an appointment for November 30, 1927. The session took place at the Victor Talking Machine Company's Studio 1 in a repurposed building that had been the former Camden Trinity Baptist Church, favored for its acoustics. The first few numbers Rodgers sang did not appeal to Peer because they were songs by other artists, as Peer intended to record material he could copyright. Rodgers then sang a new composition, which Peer named "Blue Yodel" because of Rodgers's use of yodeling during its breaks.

The series of songs, later known as "Blue Yodels", often featured the story of a man who exaggerated his qualities as a lover, faced the threat of other men taking his woman, and then used violence against them when they did. Meanwhile, the character boasted of promiscuity with the use of double entendres. Rodgers either developed the usage of yodeling in his act over the years, or was inspired by Emmet Miller's recordings and live appearances. Jimmie Rodgers's wife Carrie suggested that her husband chose not to record one of his Blue Yodels during the first session so as not to distract Peer from his vocal and guitar abilities. Rodgers also had doubts about the reception the song's storyline would receive. "Blue Yodel" was used to tell the story of Thelma, who leaves the narrator for another man. While the narrator assures his love interest that he can replace her easily, he plans to seek vengeance on her and the lover. The narrator declares "I can get more women than a passenger train can haul", and he says he is going to shoot Thelma "just to see her jump and fall". He adds that he is going to kill the man with a shotgun, and then leave the state of Georgia.

The writing of "Blue Yodel" was credited to Rodgers. Like other blues performers at the time, Rodgers composed his songs by mixing original lines with those of traditional and roadshow songs. Jim Jackson first recorded the opening line, "T for Texas, T for Tennessee" on his song "Jim Jackson's Kansas City Blues", a month before the "Blue Yodel" recording session took place. Around the same time as Rodgers's recording, the line appeared in Lonnie Johnson's rendition of Jackson's song, and later in Frank Stokes's "Nehi Mamma Blues". Bessie Smith's 1924 recording of the Spencer Williams-penned "Ticket Agent, Ease Your Window Down" features the line, "I can get more men than a passenger train can haul."

"Blue Yodel No. 1"
The first lines of the song

Jimmie Rodgers yodeling
Rodgers yodeling on a break

In Papa Charlie Jackson's 1925 ""The Faking Blues", the line is changed to, "I can get more women than a passenger train can haul." Meanwhile, a line similar to "shooting Thelma" appeared in Ma Rainey's 1924 "See See Rider Blues". Contemporary to Rodgers's recording, the line "just to see her fall" is echoed in Lonnie Johnson's "Low Land Moan".

The tune for "Blue Yodel" follows the traditional blues AAB pattern, which consists of singing a line twice and closing with a third one. The end of each stanza features a yodeling break, as its turnarounds emulate the conventional blues licks of the time. "Blue Yodel" features a slowed down ragtime rhythm. The syllables used for the yodel are the traditional yo-de-lay-ee, in a short-long-short form. Its modal frame features flatted seventh and third chords, characteristic of African American music and suggesting a "grinding, sexual movement". Rodgers played the guitar in the style of a walking bass. He thumbed certain strings, while he brushed the high strings of the chords with his fingers. "Blue Yodel" was recorded in two takes, with the second one picked as the master. The session produced four songs.

== Release and reception ==
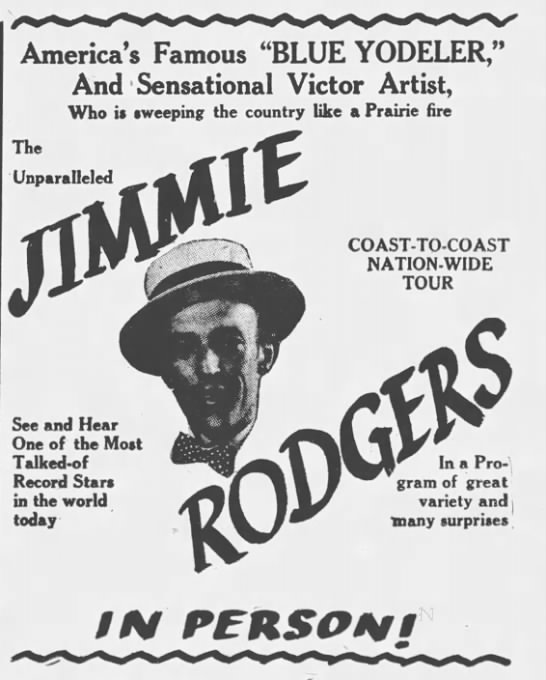
1928 advertisement promoting Rodgers as "America's Blue Yodeler"

Some time after the Studio 1 recording session, in a letter to his aunt, Rodgers complained about what he considered the late release for his second record, set for April 1928. But, as his debut record began to sell well, Peer and Victor decided to release a new recording earlier. They felt "Blue Yodel" was the strongest number from the second session and paired it with "Away Out in the Mountain". The disk was issued under catalog number Victor 21142, on February 3, 1928. Upon its release, "Blue Yodel" enjoyed success. Rodgers took a job with Washington, D.C., radio station WTTF, while continuing to make records with Victor.

Throughout 1928, sales of "Blue Yodel" increased, and Rodgers had his first hit song. It spent 14 consecutive weeks atop the Victor sales list. Though it was already present in cowboy songs, yodeling became Rodgers's trademark. He became one of the most popular recording stars of the time, and was known as "America's Blue Yodeler". By September 1928, Rodgers's income in royalties from Victor ranged from U$75,000 (equivalent to $1,406,300 in 2025) to $100,000 (equivalent to $1,875,000 in 2025) yearly, mostly stemming from the sales of "Blue Yodel". The song sold over a million copies and became Rodgers's career top seller. He often performed it during live appearances, garnering a good reception from audiences. In 1930, Rodgers sang the song for his Columbia Pictures short film The Singing Brakeman.

Peer subsequently analyzed the tunes Rodgers offered in the recording studio as his own "originals" more closely after the copyright holders of the tune of a later Rodgers release threatened to sue Victor and demanded royalties. With the release of "Blue Yodel No. 2" in 1928, "Blue Yodel" was referred to in the Victor catalogs as "Blue Yodel No. 1". In later years, the song became popularly known as "T for Texas", and often stylized as "Blue Yodel No. 1 (T For Texas)" on record releases. Riley Puckett recorded his own version of the song, which was released on Columbia Records in April 1928. Following its release, other artists started recording their renditions, that often imitated Rodgers's style to exploit his success. Frankie Marvin recorded it along with "Out Away in the Mountain", while Frankie Wallace released a version in June 1928. Cliff Carlisle entitled his version, recorded in February 1930, "T for Texas".

== Legacy ==
=== Later recordings ===
Texas Ruby and Zeke Clements covered the song for Decca Records in 1937. In 1948, Billboard deemed Merle Travis's rendition for Capitol Records as "excellent". The aggregate score of 83 was based on the reviews of disc jockeys, record dealers, and jukebox operators. The magazine's reviewer noted that the record "should register with the folk trade". Grandpa Jones's 1962 version for Monument Records peaked at number five on Billboard's US Hot Country Songs chart. The Everly Brothers included their version on their 1968 album Roots. It appeared as "T for Texas" performed by Tompall Glaser on the 1976 compilation album Wanted! The Outlaws, country music's first platinum-certified record in the US. The single featuring the song peaked at number 39 in the Hot Country Songs chart.

=== Influence ===
"Blue Yodel" was inducted into the Grammy Hall of Fame in 1985, and added to the National Recording Registry in 2004. Rolling Stone placed it at number 29 on their list 100 Greatest Country Songs of All Time. The publication's staff defined it as "a phenomenon that created country music's very first superstar", and described Rodgers's yodel as "the sound of pain made charming, even sweet". The A.V. Club critic Nathan Rabin commented that the song "helped create the blueprint for country".

"Blue Yodel" was one of the favorite tunes of Earl Scruggs's father. Rodgers became one of Scruggs's influences, and the song became a fixture in his act. Rodgers's lyrics from "Blue Yodel", "I'm gonna shoot poor Thelma/Just to see her jump and fall" inspired Johnny Cash, who listened to Rodgers, to write the line "I shot a man in Reno, just to watch him die" for 1955's "Folsom Prison Blues". In his book, Johnny Cash at Folsom Prison: The Making of a Masterpiece, Michael Streissguth comments "a case of plagiarism [over the line] can, and has, been made". Cash recorded the song with Bob Dylan in 1969. The Beatles recorded a version the same year. During band member George Harrison's childhood, his father returned from a trip to the United States with records by Rodgers, including "Blue Yodel". Harrison credited Rodgers for his interest in learning to play the guitar, and used the song "Rocking Chair in Hawaii" on his 2002 posthumous album Brainwashed. Lynyrd Skynyrd, whose lead singer Ronnie Van Zant considered Rodgers one of his favorite artists, often performed the song. Actor and singer Harry Dean Stanton remembered "Blue Yodel" as one of the first blues songs he ever sang. Bonnie Parker, a fan of Rodgers, often sang the song during her childhood.

== Charts ==
Chart performance for "Blue Yodel No. 1 (T for Texas)"
| Year | Artist | Chart | Peak position |
|---|---|---|---|
| 1963 | Grandpa Jones | US Hot Country Songs (Billboard) | 5 |
| 1976 | Tompall Glaser | US Hot Country Songs (Billboard) | 39 |
