= Jimmie Rodgers =

American country singer (1897–1933)

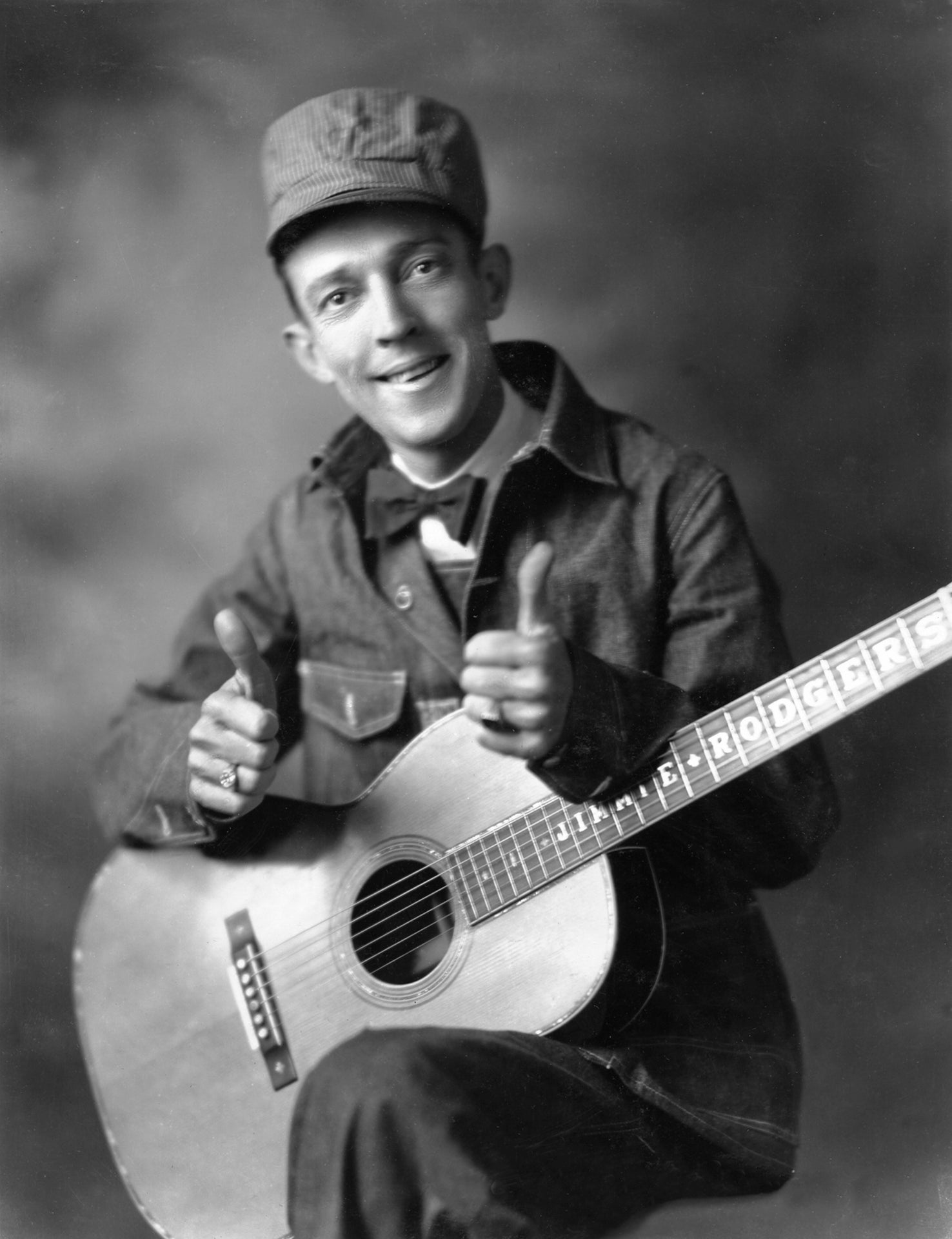
- Rodgers in 1931
- Born: James Charles Rodgers; September 8, 1897; Meridian, Mississippi, U.S.
- Died: May 26, 1933 (aged 35); New York City, U.S.
- Occupations: Singer-songwriter; musician; performer
- Years active: 1910–1933
- Spouses: Stella Kelly (m. 1917; div. 1919); Carrie Williamson (m. 1920)
- Musical career
- Genres: Country; blues; folk
- Instruments: Vocals; acoustic guitar; banjo
- Label: Victor/RCA Victor/Bluebird
- Website: www.jimmierodgers.com

James Charles Rodgers (September 8, 1897 – May 26, 1933) was an American singer, songwriter, and musician who rose to popularity in the late 1920s. Known as Jimmie Rodgers and widely regarded as the "Father of Country Music", he is best known for his distinctive yodeling. Rodgers was known as "The Singing Brakeman" and "America's Blue Yodeler". He has been cited as an inspiration by many artists, and he has been inducted into multiple halls of fame.

Originally from Meridian, Mississippi, Rodgers was the son of railroad worker Aaron Rodgers. During his early childhood the family moved according to the needs of his father's employment, or Rodgers' own poor health. As a teenager he was musically influenced by the diverse vaudeville shows that he often attended. At the age of 13 he won a local singing contest, and then traveled through the Southern United States with a medicine show. After his father took him back home to Meridian, Rodgers dropped out of school and joined the Mobile and Ohio Railroad, beginning as a waterboy on his father's gang; he later performed other functions on the railroad, eventually becoming a brakeman. During his time working with different railroad companies, the singer further developed his musical style; he was influenced by the gandy dancers and their impromptu blues performances. Rodgers was diagnosed with tuberculosis in 1924. By 1927, as a result of his declining health, he stopped working for the railroad and decided to focus on his music career.

Rodgers joined the Tenneva Ramblers band in 1927, which at the time was working at a radio station. After the band was fired from its spot, it worked in different resorts in the Blue Ridge Mountains. There, Rodgers became aware of the field recordings that Victor Talking Machine Company's engineer Ralph Peer was to undertake in Bristol, Tennessee. During what later became known as the Bristol sessions, Rodgers recorded solo, having been deserted by his band after a disagreement. A second session with Rodgers was later arranged in Camden, New Jersey, at the singer's own insistence; that session produced "Blue Yodel No. 1 (T for Texas)". The song became a success, propelling Rodgers to national fame and beginning his recording career with the label, during which he produced over 120 songs. Jimmie Rodgers died of tuberculosis on May 26, 1933, at age 35.

== Early life ==
The Rodgers family migrated to the United States from England and Ireland before the American Revolution. They settled around the Appalachian Mountains, and later moved to the Southern and Western United States. Both of Jimmie Rodgers' grandfathers served in the Confederate States Army during the American Civil War. After the war his maternal grandfather settled in Meridian, Mississippi, while his paternal grandfather settled around Geiger, Alabama. Rodgers' father, Aaron, worked for the Mobile and Ohio Railroad. He eventually became a foreman, and in 1884 he married Eliza Bozeman. The couple lived in the railroad work camps as Aaron Rodgers moved through different locations along the line. The Rodgers family then temporarily settled in the community of Pine Springs, north of Meridian.

Charles James "Jimmie" Rodgers was born on September 8, 1897. His place of birth is disputed: Meridian—which Rodgers often called his home town—is most often listed in records, but he later signed a document that named Geiger, Alabama. (The document was signed in order for him to join a local fraternal organization; historians do not take it seriously.) Rodgers' mother, incapable of living in the unsanitary conditions of the camps, decided to stay in Pine Springs, while her husband frequently worked for long periods and returned home when he could. After two miscarriages, her health began to fail. She became sick, and Aaron Rodgers quit his job at the Mobile and Ohio Railroad and began farming, so as to be closer to his wife. She died in 1903. The then-six-year-old Jimmie Rodgers was deeply affected by his mother's death. He was sent, along with his brother Talmage, to live with relatives of his father in Scooba, Mississippi, and later to Geiger. Rodgers attended school irregularly during his early childhood; he did not attend at all for a time following the death of his mother. After the family moved to Lowndes County, Mississippi, he and his brother went to school in the town of Artesia. Rodgers and his brother often arrived late to school or missed it altogether as a result of road conditions and other distractions. Rodgers often missed classes during the winter due to his tendency to suffer from colds and respiratory issues.

His father remarried and the family moved to Meridian, where Rodgers was enrolled at the local high school. He and his siblings had problems with their new stepmother. When his father returned to work for the railroad, Rodgers again rarely went to school. Instead, he and his brother Jake went to the local theaters to see vaudeville shows and watch movies. As a result, Rodgers became interested in the entertainment industry. To support his expenditures he sold newspapers and molasses, or he panhandled. In 1906, he was sent to live with his older brother Talmage and their aunt Dora Bozeman in Pine Springs, while his brother Jake was sent to other relatives. The routine of the Bozeman household grounded Rodgers with chores and he spent most of his free time outdoors. He started to attend school regularly and he was further assisted by his teacher, who rented a room at his aunt's boarding house. Rodgers received most of his schooling while he lived there until he went back to Meridian in 1911.

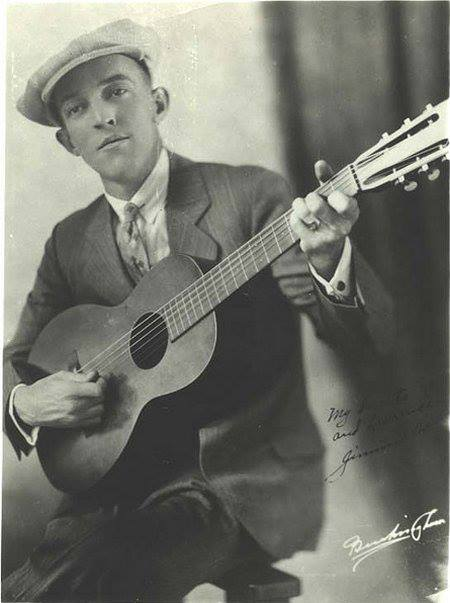
Rodgers in a 1921 portrait

Upon his return to Meridian, he went back to the streets. He frequented the barbershop of his uncle Tom Bozeman and he often slept during the daytime in the upstairs apartment. He organized a neighborhood carnival that played the nearby towns. Rodgers' appearances made enough money to pay for the sheets he used as a tent. He then organized a second show, which he financed with his father's money, unbeknownst to him. Rodgers then won a contest at the local Elite Theater for his performance of the songs "Steamboat Bill" and "I Wonder Why Bill Bailey Don't Come Home". Following his success, Rodgers started to perform with a medicine show. He quit the show some weeks later as they reached Birmingham, Alabama, claiming the proprietor did not treat him well. At the age of thirteen, he started working for a tailor in West Blocton, Alabama, until, months later, his father took him back to Meridian with the intention of enrolling him at a new school. Soon afterward, his stepmother died. Instead of attending school, Rodgers followed his father to learn his profession with the working crews of the Mobile and Ohio Railroad.

Rodgers started working for the railroad as a waterboy for the black gandy dancer crews, who introduced him to the railroad jargon, their work songs, and banjo playing. Eventually, he became a baggage handler and then a brakeman. He moved often while working on the lines from Mississippi to Texas. In January 1917, he was introduced by a friend to Stella Kelly in Durant, Mississippi. At that time Rodgers was moving between Jackson and New Orleans without a stable location. He maintained the lines, checked baggage, and at times worked as a dishwasher at a local restaurant in Durant. He and Kelly married on April 6, 1917. The newlyweds left Durant after Rodgers' job as an apprentice mechanic failed to work out, and moved to Louisville, Mississippi, where he again worked as a brakeman. After his marriage fell apart, he began working for the New Orleans and Northeastern Railroad (NO&NE), spending time in both Meridian and New Orleans. He was fired from the NO&NE in 1920, and then worked odd jobs. In the early 1920s he returned to work stints on the railway lines where he had previously worked, as well as on the Vicksburg, Shreveport and Pacific Railway. He worked mainly as a brakeman, but he also performed other functions, including flagman.

== Music career ==
In 1924, Rodgers was diagnosed with tuberculosis at the age of 27. The disease affected his ability to perform his work; following the medical advice of the time, which suggested living in elevated and dry locations to ease the symptoms, he chose to move with his wife and children to Arizona. Then, Rodgers moved to Asheville, North Carolina. As he worked less on the railroads and his foreman complained of his extended absences, he returned to performing music. Rodgers formed a jazz-style band that performed pop standards with the inclusion of horns and the piano accompaniment of his new wife Carrie McWilliams' sister, Elsie McWilliams. The group played on the road in tents, on city streets and in various other small locations without any commercial success.

In 1927, Rodgers left his work on the railroad. In Asheville he met the Grant Brothers, who led the mountain music string band the Tenneva Ramblers. Rodgers convinced the group to join him as the Jimmie Rodgers Entertainers, with him as the lead singer, for a recurrent, unpaid spot he managed to obtain at WWNC. The band was composed of Rodgers (vocals and guitar), Claude Grant (vocals and guitar), Jack Grant (mandolin), Jack Pierce (fiddle) and, at times, Claude Sagle (banjo).

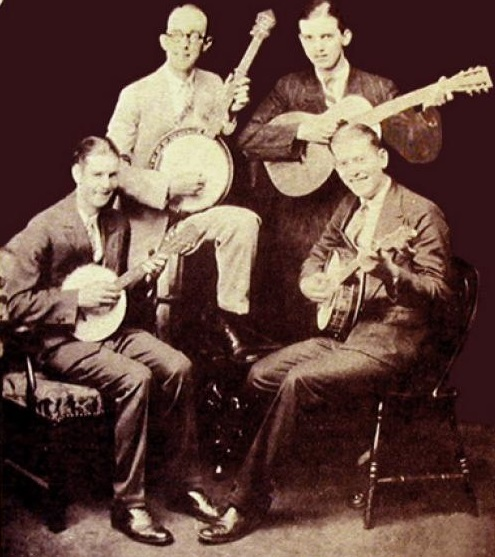
The Jimmie Rodgers Entertainers (Rodgers, second from the left, holding a banjo)

After the group was fired from the radio show, they found a job performing at a resort in the Blue Ridge Mountains. There, Rodgers heard of the upcoming field recordings that engineer Ralph Peer of the Victor Talking Machine Company was to undertake in Bristol, Tennessee, in search of local talent. Rodgers made an appointment for the band to record with Peer on August 4, 1927. Before the scheduled recording, the band had a dispute with the singer regarding the name to be used on the label of the recording. The Tenneva Ramblers then deserted Rodgers, who convinced Peer to record him alone with his guitar.

Peer later commented that he considered Rodgers an individualist, who, due to his blues-leaning style, was incompatible with the sound of the Tenneva Ramblers band, which based its music around the use of fiddles. By the end of Rodgers' session, Peer felt that although he liked the singer, he could not sign him to the label as he was performing pop music that belonged to New York publishers, instead of the original tunes that Peer was scouting for. The session produced "The Soldier's Sweetheart", an adaptation of an old vaudeville tune with new lyrics by Rodgers, and a version of the showtune, "Sleep, Baby, Sleep".

After the session, Peer told Rodgers that he would contact him at a later date to hear new original material. Rodgers then moved with his family to Washington, D.C., and the record sold some copies. After a month of not hearing back from Peer, Rodgers decided to travel to New York City, where he checked into the Manger Hotel and called the producer to let him know that he was ready to undertake his next recording session. Impressed by Rodgers' boldness, Peer set an appointment for November 30, 1927, at Studio 1 of the Victor Talking Machine Company in Camden, New Jersey. The first few numbers that Rodgers tried did not appeal to Peer, as they were once again not original material. Rodgers then attempted a number he had been working on using yodeling, which Peer called "Blue Yodel".

When "The Soldier's Sweetheart" / "Sleep, Baby, Sleep" record started to sell well, Victor decided to advance the release of "Blue Yodel". In Washington, D.C., Rodgers worked a stint for the station WTTF with the backing of the "Jimmie Rodgers' Southerners", while he continued to make records for the label. He used the band for his recordings of "In the Jailhouse Now" and "The Brakeman's Blues", among others.

Blue Yodel No. 1
Excerpt of Rodgers' most successful recording, "Blue Yodel No. 1"

As 1928 progressed, "Blue Yodel" became a major success. The song marked the first of a series of blue yodels. The unknown origin of Rodgers' yodel has been attributed to several sources, including traditional alpine songs, its use by gandy dancers and its use in vaudeville and minstrel shows. The yodels presented a main character who often exaggerated his qualities as a lover, threatening other men who try to take his woman or declaring that he can easily find another one, and vocalizing verses that deal with promiscuity and violence, often using double entendres. With the release of further songs of the series,"Blue Yodel" was later renamed on the catalogs to "Blue Yodel No. 1 (T for Texas)". "Blue Yodel No. 1" became the singer's most successful recording, with over a million copies sold during his lifetime. Soon, Rodgers' show billed him as "America's Blue Yodeler".

Following the release of "If Brother Jack Were Here", Victor was threatened with a lawsuit by Joseph W. Stern & Co. for copyright infringement of their original composition "Mother Was a Lady". As a result, the label renamed the record and Peer began to carefully assess the material brought by Rodgers. The singer often arrived to the recording sessions short of material and he resorted to passing off old vaudeville and minstrel show songs as his own. After Peer rejected several songs, Rodgers contacted his sister-in-law, Elsie McWilliams, to help him with the composition of new material. Few of the songs credited to Rodgers were authored by himself; McWilliams wrote most of his Blue Yodels and Rodgers also hired amateur composers to write other songs. With McWilliams' help, he would also write compositions of his own, which she remarked Rodgers would not stop working on until they "sounded just right".

With the sales of his records still improving after the release of "In the Jailhouse Now", Rodgers embarked on a tour of the United States: he appeared on the Southern Time circuit of Loews Theaters and the East Coast circuit of Publix Theaters. The pairing of "Blue Yodel No. 4 (California Blues)" / "Waiting for a Train" became popular due to the success of the flipside record. The recording would eventually become Rodgers' second best seller of his career, with a total of 365,000 copies sold during his lifetime.

In February 1929, Rodgers' health worsened. Against his doctor's consistent recommendations to rest, Rodgers proceeded with his tour. During a stop in Meridian, he suffered a fever. Rodgers intended to perform the show, but he collapsed on the dressing room floor shortly before its start. His doctor ordered an x-ray—an uncommon procedure at the time—and determined that the singer was suffering from pulmonary tuberculosis, which affected his lungs. Cavities were found on the top of both lungs, while the bottom of his right lung showed pleurisy. As they traveled through Texas performing, Jimmie and Carrie Rodgers stopped in Kerrville. The town offered the dry air and mild weather that the medical authorities of the time considered necessary for the treatment of tuberculosis. Kerrville was home to multiple sanatoriums and a Veterans Hospital, which specialized in pulmonary disease. As Rodgers was badly affected by the weather in Washington, D.C., Meridian and Asheville, he decided to settle in Kerrville. The construction of his new home began in April 1929. With a total cost of approximately $20,000 (equivalent to $380,000 in 2025), he named it "Blue Yodeler's Paradise". With his move to Texas, Rodgers' on-stage attire changed. He had previously worn brakeman's working clothes, which he replaced with regular clothes and a cowboy hat. On June 14, 1929, he performed at the inaugural event of San Antonio's Majestic Theatre.

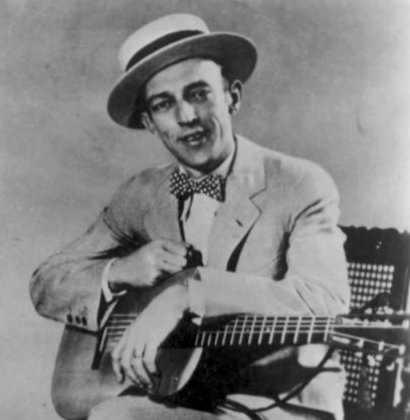
Rodgers in 1929

At the height of this career, in 1929, Rodgers made approximately $75,000 (equivalent to $1,406,000 in 2025) in royalties. After the Wall Street Crash that year, while his records continued to sell, his royalties dropped to approximately $60,000 (equivalent to $1,130,000 in 2025). "Waiting for a Train" continued to be popular, as the themes depicted in the song became commonplace in the lives of unemployed Americans during the Great Depression. Through a number of field recording sessions—made as his schedule and tour allowed it—Rodgers increased his catalog. By November 1929, he had filmed The Singing Brakeman at the RCA Victor studios in Camden.

Continuing his tour, in late February 1930, Rodgers collapsed again during a stop in Carthage, Mississippi. After he suffered a hemorrhage, Rodgers followed his doctor's advice and canceled his third appearance at the local movie house. Despite his condition, Rodgers then joined a four-month tour with daily appearances on Swain's Hollywood Follies. Rodgers and his musical troupe performed a total of 70 shows. With few of his recordings left to be released, Rodgers headed to Los Angeles to produce new material in June–July 1930. The sessions produced, among other numbers, "Blue Yodel no. 8, Mule Skinner Blues" and "Blue Yodel No. 9 (Standin' on the Corner)" featuring Louis Armstrong. Rodgers commissioned Ray Hall, at the time a prisoner at the Texas State Penitentiary, to help him write the song "T.B. Blues" after McWilliams refused to help. Rodgers recorded and released the composition in 1931.

In the summer of 1931, Rodgers recorded two sides with the Carter Family. That year, his health quickly deteriorated and his sales fell to an average of 30,000 copies per record as the Great Depression progressed. Meanwhile, his excessive expenditures forced him to sell his Kerrville home. "Rodgers' Puzzle Record", a compilation containing three recordings of the singer on one side, was released in England, India, and Australia in 1931. The same year, the singer accepted an offer to make appearances, when available, on San Antonio radio station KMAC's Tuesday show. When he was on tour, The Jimmie Rodgers Show played his Victor recordings. In April 1932, he renegotiated his contract with the label: Rodgers was to receive $25,000 (equivalent to $529,000 in 2025) for 24 sides to be released monthly, with the singer receiving $250 (equivalent to $5,900 in 2025) in advance payment per side.

=== Declining health and death ===
As his health condition worsened, Rodgers reduced his appearances on tour schedules from five days to one per venue; he also camped in a tent, which allowed for better air circulation. A number of concerts were cut short because of his condition, while others were cancelled. Until 1932, Peer took trips for field sessions to record Rodgers in Atlanta, New Orleans and Dallas. After RCA Victor ended his field sessions, Rodgers traveled to Camden, to record at the company's studios. Rodgers managed to produce ten sides, with regular rest between takes. Realizing the state of health of the singer, Peer arranged a follow-up session to create a backlog for the Rodgers catalog. Rodgers then returned to San Antonio, where he spent most of his time in bed until, in October of that year, he resumed his appearances on the local radio station. In the early winter of 1932, he made appearances throughout East Texas until he collapsed during a show in Lufkin and was placed in an oxygen tent. He then stopped performing at KMAC and stayed at home while he arranged a new recording session with Peer for May.

Rodgers and his personal nurse, Cora Bedell, traveled to New York City on the SS Mohawk and arrived on May 14, 1933. Peer left the singer to rest at his usual lodging, the Taft Hotel (earlier The Manger), for a few days before the session. Meanwhile, he assigned Rodgers a driver, known as Castro. The recording session, with Fred Maisch engineering, began on May 17 at RCA Victor's New York Studios at 153 E 24th Street. During the first two days, Rodgers recorded six numbers. The singer sat on an easy chair and was propped up by pillows to reach the microphone; the sessions were often paused as a result of his health. A new session was scheduled for May 24, 1933. Rodgers produced four songs and lay on a cot between takes. At the end of the day, he was helped into a cab and returned to his hotel. The next day, he recovered and then visited Coney Island with his driver. When returning, Rodgers decided to walk the last few blocks to the hotel, but he needed help to return to his room. He then suffered an intense cough, which eventually stopped. At midnight, he resumed coughing and began to hemorrhage. The hotel's doctor could not be found and Castro, who was out on an errand, returned too late to take him to a hospital. Rodgers fell in a coma and he died soon after.

Rodgers' pearl-gray casket was placed on a raised platform covered in lilies in a baggage car and taken back to Meridian by the Southern Railway on a trip operated by former workmates of Rodgers. On May 29, 1933, his body lay in state at the local Scottish Rite Cathedral. That afternoon, escorted by members of the Scottish Rite, the Hamasa Shrine Temple and the Knights of Pythias, his body was buried at Oak Grove Cemetery. During his lifetime, Rodgers reinvigorated the deflated sales record market for RCA Victor, and, despite the drop of sales during the depression, his records continued to sell well. At the time of his death, his sales represented 10% of the total for the label.

== Style and image ==
Rodgers performs "Blue Yodel No. 1", featuring his railroad worker attire and his characteristic yodeling

Rodgers recalled his earliest memories of playing the guitar upon returning from picking cotton during his childhood. Although he performed with the instrument for many years, he only knew a few chords, which he complemented with a flatpicking technique. As he worked on the railroads through the late 1910s and the 1920s, he developed his style of music and singing. His material was based on classic Anglo-Celtic storytelling and ballad singing and black blues heavily influenced him. Ethnomusicologist Norm Cohen defined five categories for the 112 recordings that make up Rodgers' catalog: "19th century sentimental ballads", vaudevillian novelty songs, blues songs, traditional folk songs and "contemporary hillbilly songs". Rodgers' releases included collaborations with artists ranging from jazz performers to Hawaiian musicians.

Instead of the 3/4 time present in traditional alpine folk music, Rodgers' yodel featured a 4/4 time. Rodgers developed his yodel through his early music career; he was likely influenced by several vaudevillian performers or by the recordings and live performances of Emmett Miller. From the gandy dancers, Rodgers learned to elongate or shorten words to fit the metric of a song. He also carried a banjo or a guitar with him as he worked on the railroads. His live performances and recordings included the use of spoken remarks between verses to encourage his musicians, or exclamations when he played alone. Additionally, Rodgers developed a train whistle noise, which he made with the back of his throat through a mixture of a yodel and a whistle.

During his early appearances, Rodgers donned a bowler hat with a suit and a tie in the style of vaudevillian performers. When he was later billed as "The Singing Brakeman", Rodgers added railroad worker attire to his stage wardrobe. After he moved to Texas, he started to wear cowboy hats and western clothes, similar to the singing cowboys which were becoming popular in Western films. Rodgers would ultimately decide which clothes he would wear for a performance according to the audience he was expecting.

== Personal life ==
Rodgers married Stella Kelly on May 1, 1917, when they were both 19 years old. They separated soon after due to what Kelly later described as Rodgers' tendency to procrastinate and drink, and his lack of ambition. She believed that Rodgers spent too much money and that by playing music he would "fool away his time and money". After two years of living apart, their divorce became final in November 1919. Rodgers then married Carrie Williamson on April 7, 1920. Their first daughter, Anita, was born in January 1921. June, their second child, was born in 1923, but she died in December of that year. To return in time for her funeral and Christmas, Rodgers had to pawn his banjo. Both of his wives complained of Rodgers' excessive expenditures, and later his lavish lifestyle. Rodgers resorted to drinking to ease the pain caused by his tuberculosis.

On June 9, 1932, Rodgers lost a paternity lawsuit to his former wife Stella. She alleged that Rodgers was the father of her daughter, Kathryn Rodgers, who was born in February 1918. Although there was no conclusive evidence that Rodgers had slept with Kelly at the time of the child's conception, judge Edgar Vaught held that she was conceived in legal wedlock. Rodgers was ordered to pay $50 monthly (equivalent to $1,200 in 2025) in child support until Kathryn reached 18 years of age. After Rodgers' death, the monthly support from his estate stopped when Stella re-married. Kathryn Rodgers died soon after, in 1938.

Rodgers was a Freemason. He was inducted to the order in Meridian on August 9, 1920. In 1930, he joined the Elks lodge. In 1931, he reached the rank of Master Mason in Meridian. That year, he was moved to the San Antonio Scottish Rite Cathedral and received the local degree. He was also associated with the Alzafar Temple. In 1931, Rodgers was invited to Austin, Texas, and named an honorary Texas Ranger. To commemorate the occasion, the singer would later release the song "The Yodeling Ranger".

== Legacy ==
=== Influence ===
Rodgers is considered the "Father of Country Music". The Country Music Hall of Fame inducted Rodgers among the inaugural class of 1961. According to the Hall of Fame, Rodgers "brought to the emerging genre of 'hillbilly music' a distinctive, colorful personality and a rousing vocal style" that "created and defined the role of the singing star in country music". The Rock and Roll Hall of Fame inducted Rodgers as an early influence with the class of 1986. Rodgers was inducted by Jerry Wexler, as the Hall of Fame determined that the genre "owes an immeasurable debt" to the singer, and that, despite being a country music singer, "his fusion of blues, Appalachian ballads and spirituals was an early framework for rock and roll" that influenced "everyone from Bob Dylan to Lynyrd Skynyrd". The Blues Hall of Fame wrote about Rodgers induction: "His reworkings of the blues not only helped popularize the music with white audiences but were also performed by many singers from the African American community that produced the blues that inspired Rodgers in the first place". Rodgers was the first artist inducted to the Songwriters Hall of Fame in 1970 for his influence in artists of "every genre" through music that "fused hillbilly, gospel, blues, jazz, pop and mountain folk music into timeless American standards". That same year, he was inducted to the Nashville Songwriters Hall of Fame. The entry on Rodgers remarked on his "undying" influence on multiple generations of musicians. He was also inducted into the Alabama Music Hall of Fame and the Blue Ridge Music Hall of Fame in 1993 and 2018 respectively.

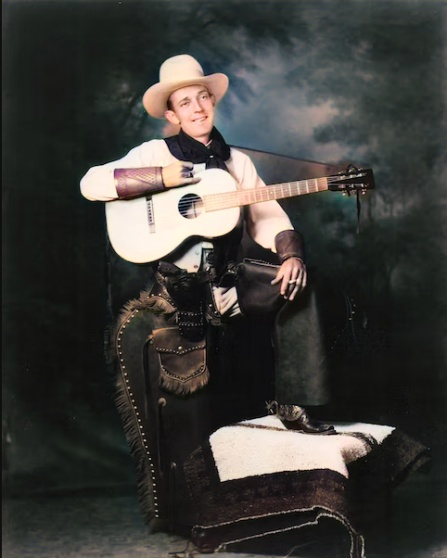
Rodgers wearing cowboy attire following his move to Texas. Photo has been colorized.

For Encyclopædia Britannica, Rodgers' legacy made him "one of the principal figures in the emergence of the country and western style of popular music". Rolling Stone magazine placed Rodgers at number 11 on its 100 Greatest Country Artists of All Time list, and at number 88 on their 200 Greatest Singers of All Time list. Allmusic has described Rodgers as "the first nationally known star of country music", noted his influence on later musicians and declared that the singer "affected the history of country music by making it a viable, commercially popular medium".

Country singers Gene Autry and Jimmie Davis, as well as western swing singer Tommy Duncan, were heavily influenced by Rodgers. Autry, Davis and Duncan recorded multiple songs of his repertoire, including yodeling tracks, until they changed their styles to avoid being deemed imitators. As a teenager, Hank Snow heard Rodgers' "Moonlight and Skies" on the radio. Snow started to imitate Rodgers' guitar playing and singing style, and he would later credit him as his one major influence. "Moonlight and Skies" was one of his most popular songs in many parts of the country. Ernest Tubb also considered Rodgers to be his greatest influence. Early in his career, Tubb kept a picture of Rodgers, which at one point became worn out. He then decided to call Rodgers' widow to obtain a new copy. Carrie Rodgers invited him and his family to her home. Eventually, she decided to help Tubb with his career: they recorded a duet of the tribute song "We Miss Him When the Evening Shadows Fall" and Carrie presented Tubb with Rodgers' guitar as a gift. Robert Johnson's stepsister, Annye, remembered Rodgers as their favorite country singer. Johnson played "Waiting for a Train" and imitated Rodgers' yodel. Other artists that have acknowledged influence by Rodgers include Lefty Frizzell, Roy Rogers, Eddy Arnold, Jerry Lee Lewis, Johnny Cash, Willie Nelson, Merle Haggard, Bob Dylan, George Harrison, Lynyrd Skynyrd, John Fahey, and Alison Krauss. Rodgers' appearance on The Singing Brakeman is considered one of the first music videos.

In South Africa, Rodgers' records were distributed by Regal Zonophone Records. In his autobiography, Down Second Avenue, writer Es'kia Mphahlele described about his memories of young men bringing gramophones and Rodgers' records from Pretoria, and how his music could be heard on Christmas Day throughout his village. Rodgers' records sold particularly well in Durban, a city mostly populated by the Zulu. In 1930, singers Griffiths Motsieloa and Ignatius Monare recorded their version of a blue yodel in Zulu language, entitled "Aubuti Nkikho", in London. In 1932, William Mseleku recorded "Eku Hambeni" and "Sifikile Tina". The songs were inspired by Rodgers' style and recorded in Zulu. Rodgers influenced several Zimbabwean acoustic guitarists of the 1940s, who had heard records imported from South Africa, including Chinemberi, Mattaka, Jacob Mhungu and Jeremiah Kainga. Local artists developed a two-finger playing style that used the thumb and first finger to emulate the sound of the singer and they frequently used yodels. Recordings of Rodgers were taken to the Great Rift Valley of Kenya by English missionaries who lived among the Kipsigis people. The tribe sang about Rodgers in a traditional song recorded in 1950 by ethnomusicologist Hugh Tracey who later named it "Chemirocha III".

=== Tributes ===
In January 1935, Grand Ole Opry artists the Delmore Brothers and Uncle Dave Macon stopped on their way to New Orleans to visit Rodgers' brother Talmage and his wife in Meridian to play a tribute song called "Blue Railroad Train". That same year, Rodgers' widow published a biographical book: My Husband, Jimmie Rodgers. On May 16, 1953, the first Jimmie Rodgers Memorial Festival was held in Meridian. The festival featured appearances by country music singers and other entertainers who were influenced by Rodgers, as well as his family members. The festival was celebrated in an intermittent fashion until it became a recurring event starting in 1972. Attendees at the first event included Carrie Rodgers, Elsie McWilliams, Ralph Peer, Hugh L. White, Frank G. Clement, railroad representatives, Mary Jones (the wife of engineer Casey Jones) and Lillie Williams (Hank Williams' mother). Several performers who were influenced by Rodgers were present, including 25 Grand Ole Opry artists led by Ernest Tubb and Hank Snow. The show attracted a crowd of 30,000. A granite monument to Rodgers was unveiled, as well as a static locomotive as a memorial to the deceased railroad workers of Meridian.

On May 24, 1978, the United States Postal Service issued a 13-cent commemorative stamp honoring Rodgers, the first in its long-running Performing Arts Series. The stamp was designed by Jim Sharpe and depicted Rodgers with brakeman's outfit and guitar, standing in front of a locomotive giving his famous "two thumbs up" gesture. The 1982 film Honkytonk Man, directed by and starring Clint Eastwood, was loosely based on Rodgers' life. In 1997, Bob Dylan put together a tribute compilation of major artists covering Rodgers' songs, The Songs of Jimmie Rodgers: A Tribute. The artists included Bono, Alison Krauss & Union Station, Jerry Garcia, Dickey Betts, Dwight Yoakam, Aaron Neville, John Mellencamp, Willie Nelson and others. In 2004, Steve Forbert's tribute album Any Old Time was nominated for a Grammy Award for Best Traditional Folk Album. In 2007, Rodgers was honored with a marker on the Mississippi Blues Trail in his hometown of Meridian, the first outside of the Mississippi Delta. In May 2010, a marker on the Mississippi Country Music Trail was erected near Rodgers' grave site. The Elton John and Leon Russell 2010 collaboration The Union featured the tribute "Jimmie Rodgers' Dream". In 2013, a North Carolina historical marker was dedicated on Haywood Street in Asheville.

== See also ==
- Jimmie Rodgers discography
