= Jeannie Seely discography =

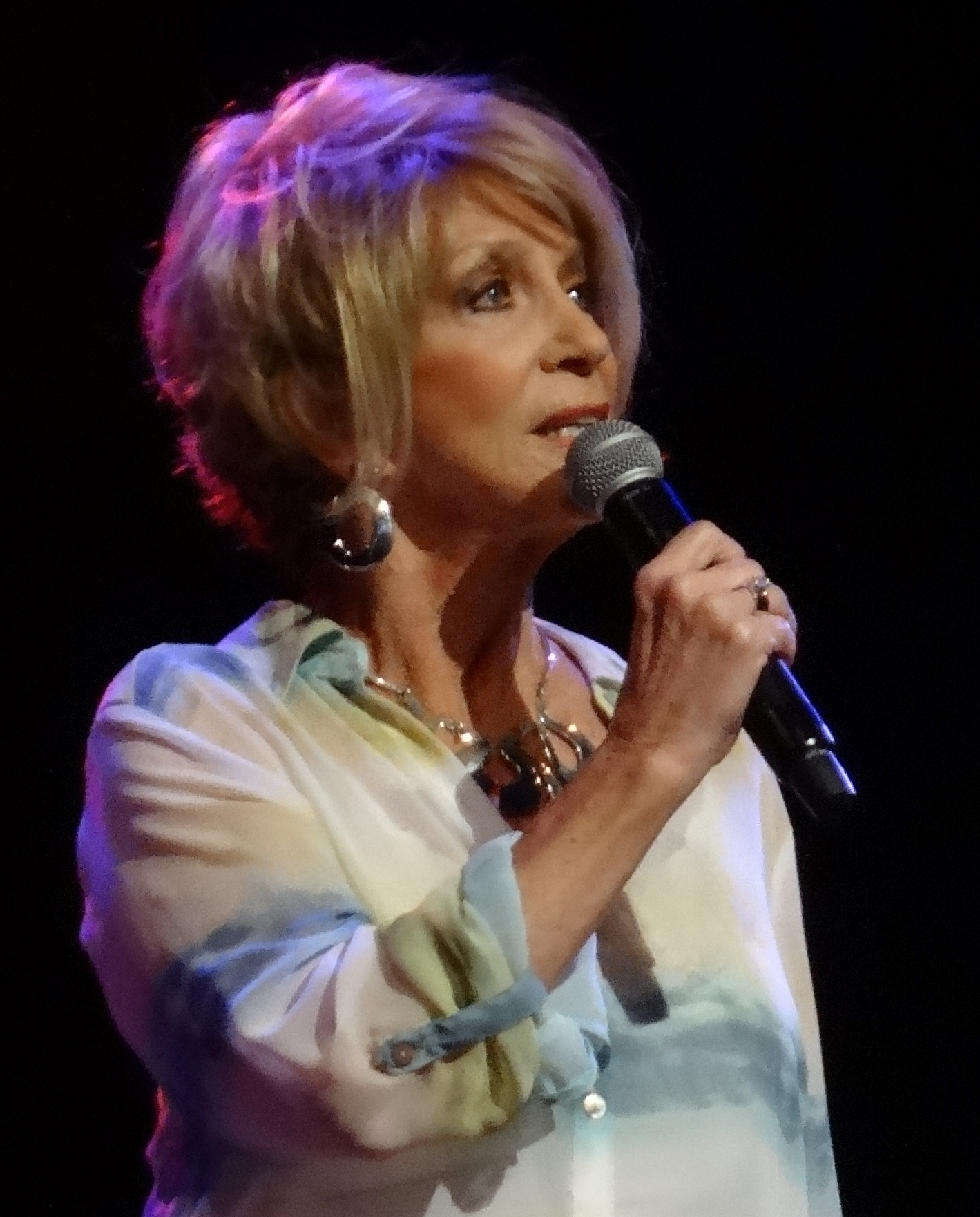
- Jeannie Seely at the Grand Ole Opry, 2015.
- Studio albums: 17
- Soundtrack albums: 1
- Live albums: 1
- Compilation albums: 4
- Singles: 36
- Music videos: 4
- Other album appearances: 17

The discography of American country artist Jeannie Seely contains 17 studio albums, four compilation albums, one soundtrack album, four music videos, 17 album appearances and 36 singles. Her first singles were for the Challenge label before 1966's "Don't Touch Me". The latter reached number two on the US Billboard Hot Country Singles chart and her only single to reach the Billboard Hot 100, peaking at number 85. The song was included on her debut studio album titled The Seely Style (1966), which reached number eight on the US Billboard Top Country Albums chart.

Seely's next two follow-up singles reached the US country top 20: "It's Only Love" (1966) and "A Wanderin' Man" (1967). In 1968, "I'll Love You More (Than You'll Need)" reached the number ten position. She also released three more studio albums during this time. This included Thanks, Hank!, which peaked at number 17 on the country albums chart in 1967. Moving to Decca Records, she paired with Jack Greene for a series of duet recordings. Their first single, "Wish I Didn't Have to Miss You", reached number two on the US country chart in 1969. Spawning an album, the project peaked at number 18 on the country albums chart in 1970. In 1973, Seely had her first top ten single in four years with "Can I Sleep in Your Arms". It was followed by the top 20 US and Canadian country song "Lucky Ladies". Both were included on an album of the same name, which peaked at number 15 on the country albums chart in 1973.

Seely continued recording singles which made chart appearances on the US and Canadian song lists through the late 1970s. Her final chart appearance was 1978's "Take Me to Bed", which reached number 97. During this period, she also released a live album with Jack Greene. The pair teamed together in 1981 for a studio album of re-recordings titled Greatest Hits. Seely then self-released her next studio project on cassette in 1990. It was followed by an album of Christmas music in 1994 called Number One Christmas. She has since released five additional studio albums. Her most recent was 2020's An American Classic, which was issued by Curb Records.

== Albums ==
=== Studio albums ===
List of studio albums, with selected chart positions, and other relevant details
Title	Album details	Peak chart positions
Title	Album details	US Country
The Seely Style	Released: September 1966; Label: Monument; Formats: LP	8
Thanks, Hank!	Released: May 1967; Label: Monument; Formats: LP	17
I'll Love You More	Released: February 1968; Label: Monument; Formats: LP	30
Little Things	Released: December 1968; Label: Monument; Formats: LP	36
Jeannie Seely	Released: April 1969; Label: Decca; Formats: LP	—
Jack Greene, Jeannie Seely (with Jack Greene)	Released: January 1970; Label: Decca; Formats: LP	18
Please Be My New Love	Released: July 1970; Label: Decca; Formats: LP	—
Two for the Show (with Jack Greene)	Released: January 1973; Label: Decca; Formats: LP	36
Can I Sleep in Your Arms/Lucky Ladies	Released: November 1973; Label: MCA; Formats: LP	15
Greatest Hits (re-recordings) (with Jack Greene)	Released: 1982; Label: Gusto; Formats: Cassette, LP	—
Jeannie Seely	Released: 1990; Label: Jeannie Seely; Formats: Cassette	—
Number One Christmas	Released: October 1, 1996; Label: Power Pak; Formats: Cassette, CD	—
Been There...Sung That!	Released: June 1999; Label: Shadpoke; Formats: CD	—
Life's Highway	Released: November 18, 2003; Label: OMS; Formats: CD, music download	—
Vintage Country: Old But Treasured	Released: February 1, 2011; Label: Cheyenne; Formats: CD	—
Written in Song	Released: January 13, 2017; Label: Cheyenne; Formats: CD, digital	—
An American Classic	Released: August 14, 2020; Label: Curb; Formats: CD, digital	—
"—" denotes a recording that did not chart or was not released in that territory.

=== Soundtrack albums ===
List of albums, with selected chart positions and certifications, showing other relevant details
Title	Album details	Peak chart positions					Certifications
Title	Album details	US	US Coun.	AUS	CAN	CAN Coun.	Certifications
Honeysuckle Rose (credited as "Willie Nelson and Family")	Released: July 18, 1980; Label: Columbia; Formats: LP, cassette	11	1	34	24	4	MC: Gold; RIAA: Platinum

=== Live albums ===
List of albums, showing relevant details
Title	Album details
Live at the Grand Ole Opry (with Jack Greene)	Released: May 29, 1978; Labels: Pinnacle; Formats: LP

=== Compilation albums ===
List of albums, showing relevant details
Title	Album details
Greatest Hits on Monument	Released: March 9, 1993; Label: Sony; Formats: Cassette, CD
Personal	Released: 1997; Label: Jeannie Seely; Formats: CD
20 All-Time Greatest Hits (with Jack Greene)	Released: April 30, 2003; Label: Gusto; Formats: Digital
Together Again (with Jack Greene)	Released: November 15, 2021; Label: Country Rewind; Formats: CD, digital

== Singles ==
List of lead and collaborative singles, with selected chart positions, showing other relevant details
Title	Year	Peak chart positions				Album
Title	Year	US	US AC	US Cou.	CAN Cou.	Album
"If I Can't Have You"	1964	—	—	—	—	Non-album singles
"A World Without You"	1965	—	—	—	—	Non-album singles
"Today Is Not the Day"	1965	—	—	—	—	Non-album singles
"Don't Touch Me"	1966	85	29	2	—	The Seely Style
"It's Only Love"	1966	—	—	15	—	The Seely Style
"A Wanderin' Man"	1966	—	—	13	—	Thanks, Hank!
"When It's Over"	1967	—	—	39	—	I'll Love You More
"These Memories"	1967	—	—	42	—	Thanks, Hank!
"I'll Love You More (Than You Need)"	1967	—	—	10	—	I'll Love You More
"Welcome Home to Nothing"	1968	—	—	24	—	Little Things
"How Is He?"	1968	—	—	23	—	Little Things
"Little Things"	1968	—	—	—	—	Little Things
"Just Enough to Start Me Dreamin'"	1969	—	—	43	—	Jeannie Seely
"Jeannie's Song"	1969	—	—	—	—	Please Be My New Love
"Wish I Didn't Have to Miss You" (with Jack Greene)	1969	—	—	2	21	Jack Greene, Jeannie Seely
"Please Be My New Love"	1970	—	—	46	—	Please Be My New Love
"Tell Me Again"	1970	—	—	58	—	Can I Sleep in Your Arms/Lucky Ladies
"You Don't Understand Him Like I Do"	1971	—	—	71	—	Non-album single
"Alright, I'll Sign the Papers"	1971	—	—	42	—	Can I Sleep in Your Arms/Lucky Ladies
"Much Oblige" (with Jack Greene)	1971	—	—	15	15	Two for the Show
"Pride"	1972	—	—	47	—	Can I Sleep in Your Arms/Lucky Ladies
"What in the World Has Gone Wrong with Our Love" (with Jack Greene)	1972	—	—	19	19	Two for the Show
"Farm in Pennsyltucky"	1972	—	—	72	79	Can I Sleep in Your Arms/Lucky Ladies
"Can I Sleep in Your Arms"	1973	—	—	6	4	Can I Sleep in Your Arms/Lucky Ladies
"Lucky Ladies"	1973	—	—	11	17	Can I Sleep in Your Arms/Lucky Ladies
"I Miss You"	1974	—	—	37	—	Non-album singles
"He Can Be Mine"	1974	—	—	26	13	Non-album singles
"The First Time"	1975	—	—	—	—	Non-album singles
"Take My Hand"	1975	—	—	59	—	Non-album singles
"Since I Met You, Boy"	1976	—	—	96	—	Non-album singles
"We're Still Hangin' in There, Ain't We, Jessi"	1977	—	—	80	—	Non-album singles
"Take Me to Bed"	1977	—	—	97	—	Non-album singles
"Don't Touch Me" (re-recorded version)	1981	—	—	—	—	Greatest Hits
"Not a Dry Eye in the House" (with Willie Nelson)	2020	—	—	—	—	An American Classic
"If You Could Call It That" (with Steve Wariner)	2021	—	—	—	—	An American Classic
"So Far, So Good" (with The Whites)	2022	—	—	—	—	An American Classic
"Suffertime"	2024	—	—	—	—	non-album single
"—" denotes a recording that did not chart or was not released in that territory.

== Music videos ==
List of music videos, showing year released and director
Title	Year	Director(s)	Ref.
"Trashy Women" (Confederate Railroad featuring Stonewall Jackson and Jeannie Seely)	1993	Martin Kahan	
"Wrapped Around" (Brad Paisley featuring Jeannie Seely)	2001	Brad Paisley and Jim Shea	
"Waffle House Christmas" (Bill Anderson featuring Jeannie Seely and various artists)	2018	Lee Willard	
"Suffertime"	2024	Jordan Dziekan and Carlos Torres	

== Other appearances ==
List of non-single guest appearances, with other performing artists, showing year released and album name
Title	Year	Other artist(s)	Album	Ref.
"Don't Touch Me" (radio transcription)	1973	—N/a	Country Express	
"Wish I Didn't Have to Miss You" (radio transcription)	1974	Jack Greene	Up Country	
"You've Been Leaving Me for Years"	1983	Willie Nelson	All American Cowboys	
"When Will I See You Again"	1983	—N/a	All American Cowboys	
"One Day at a Time"	1983	—N/a	Amazing Grace	
"I'll Step Aside"	1987	Ernest Tubb; Jack Greene; King Edward IV Smith	The Ernest Tubb Collection with Guests	
"What Child Is This"	1988	—N/a	K-Tel Presents Christmas Favorites	
"Ain't You Even Gonna Cry"	2001	Hank Locklin	Generations in Song	
"I'm Ready to Go"	2001	Ralph Stanley	Clinch Mountain Sweethearts	
"Mental Cruelty"	2003	Doyle Holly	Together Again	
"Those Were the Days"	2005	Dolly Parton; Mary Hopkin; Porter Wagoner; Moscow Circus	Those Were the Days	
"This Is Our Time"	2008	David Frizzell; Helen Cornelius; Kevin Denney; Jimmy Fortune; Allen Frizzell; Merle Haggard; Johnny Rodriguez	This Is Our Time	
"Waltz Across Texas"	2010	Jack Greene	Precious Memories, Treasured Friends	
"Surely I Will Lord"	2012	Al Brumley, Jr.	Al Brumley, Jr. Sings 36 Gospel Classics	
"Twelve Days of Christmas"	2015	Rhonda Vincent	Christmas Time	
"Farm in Pennsyltucky"	2018	Buck Trent	Spartanburg Blues	
"Today Is Not the Day"	2020	Amber Digby	Heroes, Mentors, And Friends: The Legends Project	
