= Jack Greene discography =

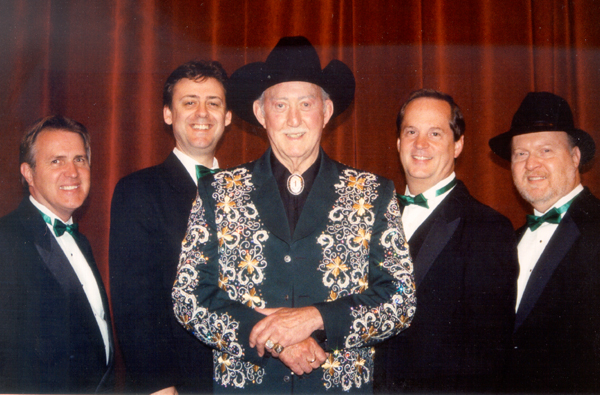
- Jack Greene and the Jolly Green Giants, 2003.
- Studio albums: 24
- Live albums: 1
- Compilation albums: 4
- Singles: 40
- Other charted songs: 5

The discography of American country artist Jack Greene contains 24 studio albums, one live album, four compilation albums, 40 singles and five other charted songs. He gained national attention as a drummer and background vocalist in Ernest Tubb's band. He soon signed a recording contract with Decca Records. Greene's second single, "Ever Since My Baby Went Away", became his first song to chart, reaching number 37 on the Billboard Hot Country Singles chart. Greene's next single, "There Goes My Everything", reached number 1 on the Billboard country chart in December 1966. Becoming his biggest hit, the song also was his only single to reach the Billboard Hot 100, peaking at number 65.

The song's success led to a string of singles that reached top ten, including a series of number one hits. Greene's number one singles during this time were "All the Time", "You Are My Treasure", "Until My Dreams Come True" and "Statue of a Fool". At the same time, Greene released a series of studio albums that became successful. His debut album (also titled There Goes My Everything) reached number 1 on the Billboard Top Country Albums chart in February 1967. Other studio albums Greene issued reached the top ten of the country albums chart. Among these studio albums was All the Time (1967), You Are My Treasure (1968), Until My Dreams Come True (1969) and Statue of a Fool (1969). In 1969, Greene paired up with Jeannie Seely to release the single "Wish I Didn't Have to Miss You", which became a major hit. Together, the pair released a series of albums, beginning with Jack Greene, Jeannie Seely in 1970. The album reached number 18 on the country albums list.

As a solo artist, Greene continued having successful singles in the early 1970s. Among these hits included the number 13 "There's a Lot About a Woman That a Man Don't Know" (1970), the number 15 "Something Unseen" (1970) and the number 17 "Satisfaction" (1971). Greene continued recording with Decca (later MCA Records) until 1976. His final studio album with the label was Greene Country (1972), which reached number 21 on the country albums chart. Greene returned with a studio album in 1980 entitled Yours for the Taking on Firstline Records. Its title track was released as a single and reached the top 40 of the Billboard country chart. Greene continued releasing albums and singles during the 1980s. His single, "If It's Love (Then Bet It All)" was his final chart appearance on the Billboard country songs chart.

== Albums ==
=== Studio albums ===
List of albums, with selected chart positions, showing other relevant details
Title	Album details	Peak chart positions	
Title	Album details	US	US Coun.
There Goes My Everything	Released: December 1966; Label: Decca; Formats: LP	66	1
All the Time	Released: June 1967; Label: Decca; Formats: LP	151	2
What Locks the Door	Released: November 1967; Label: Decca; Formats: LP	—	3
You Are My Treasure	Released: March 1968; Label: Decca; Formats: LP	—	5
Love Takes Care of Me	Released: September 1968; Label: Decca; Formats: LP	—	21
I Am Not Alone	Released: December 1968; Label: Decca; Formats: LP	—	—
Until My Dreams Come True	Released: February 1969; Label: Decca; Formats: LP	—	5
Statue of a Fool	Released: June 1969; Label: Decca; Formats: LP	—	3
Back in the Arms of Love	Released: November 1969; Label: Decca; Formats: LP	—	41
Jack Greene, Jeannie Seely (with Jeannie Seely)	Released: January 1970; Label: Decca; Formats: LP	—	18
Lord Is That Me	Released: March 1970; Label: Decca; Formats: LP	—	17
There's a Whole Lot About a Woman a Man Don't Know	Released: May 1971; Label: Decca; Formats: LP	—	34
Greene Country	Released: November 1971; Label: Decca; Formats: LP	—	21
Two for the Show (with Jeannie Seely)	Released: December 1972; Label: Decca; Formats: LP	—	36
Yours for the Taking	Released: 1980; Label: Firstline; Formats: LP	—	—
Greatest Hits (re-recordings) (with Jeannie Seely)	Released: July 1982; Label: Gusto; Formats: LP	—	—
Time After Time	Released: 1983; Label: 51 West; Formats: LP, cassette	—	—
Jack Greene Sings His Best	Released: 1983; Label: EMH; Formats: LP, cassette	—	—
Lasting First Impressions	Released: February 1986; Label: Merinet; Formats: LP, cassette	—	—
He Is My Everything	Released: May 1991; Label: Step One; Formats: Cassette, CD	—	—
Highway to the Sky	Released: April 1995; Label: Step One; Formats: Cassette, CD	—	—
Greene Christmas	Released: 2003; Label: Jack Greene; Formats: CD	—	—
Studio 102 Essentials	Released: May 20, 2008; Label: Suite 102; Formats: CD, music download	—	—
Precious Memories, Treasured Friends	Released: 2010; Label: Pretty World; Formats: CD	—	—
"—" denotes a recording that did not chart or was not released in that territory.

=== Live albums ===
List of albums, showing relevant details
Title	Album details
Live at the Grand Ole Opry (with Jack Greene)	Released: 1978; Labels: Kardina/Pinnacle; Formats: LP, cassette

=== Compilation albums ===
List of albums, with selected chart positions, showing other relevant details
Title	Album details	Peak chart positions
Title	Album details	US Country
Jack Greene's Greatest Hits	Released: July 1970; Label: Decca; Formats: LP	28
The Last Letter	Released: 1972; Label: Vocalion; Formats: Vinyl	—
Best of Jack Greene	Released: April 1976; Label: MCA; Formats: LP	—
20 All-Time Greatest Hits (with Jeannie Seely)	Released: April 30, 2003; Label: Gusto; Formats: CD, music download	—
"—" denotes a recording that did not chart or was not released in that territory.

== Singles ==
List of singles, with selected chart positions, showing other relevant details
Title	Year	Peak chart positions			Album
Title	Year	US	US Coun.	CAN Coun.	Album
"Don't You Ever Get Tired (Of Hurting Me)"	1965	—	—	—	There Goes My Everything
"Ever Since My Baby Went Away"	1965	—	37	—	There Goes My Everything
"There Goes My Everything"	1966	65	1	—	There Goes My Everything
"All the Time"	1967	— (Note: "All the Time" did not enter the Hot 100, but peaked at number 3 on Bubbling Under Hot 100 Singles, which acts as a 25-song extension of the Hot 100.)	1	—	All the Time
"What Locks the Door"	1967	—	2	8	What Locks the Door
"You Are My Treasure"	1968	—	1	1	You Are My Treasure
"Love Takes Care of Me"	1968	—	4	4	Love Takes Care of Me
"Until My Dreams Come True"	1968	—	1	5	Until My Dreams Come True
"Statue of a Fool"	1969	—	1	3	Statue of a Fool
"Back in the Arms of Love"	1969	—	4	22	Back in the Arms of Love
"Wish I Didn't Have to Miss You" (with Jeannie Seely)	1969	—	2	21	Jack Greene, Jeannie Seely
"Lord Is That Me"	1970	—	16	16	Lord Is That Me
"The Whole World Comes to Me"	1970	—	14	13	There's a Whole Lot About a Woman a Man; Don't Know
"Something Unseen"	1970	—	15	17	There's a Whole Lot About a Woman a Man; Don't Know
"There's a Lot About a Woman (A Man Don't Know)"	1971	—	13	15	There's a Whole Lot About a Woman a Man; Don't Know
"Hangin' Over Me"	1971	—	26	19	Greene Country
"Much Oblige" (with Jeannie Seely)	1971	—	15	15	Two for the Show
"If You Ever Need My Love"	1972	—	31	—	—N/a
"What in the World Has Gone Wrong with Our Love" (with Jeannie Seely)	1972	—	19	19	Two for the Show
"Satisfaction"	1972	—	17	12	Greene Country
"The Fool I've Been Today"	1973	—	40	70	—N/a
"I Need Somebody Bad"	1973	—	11	3	—N/a
"It's Time to Cross That Bridge"	1974	—	13	77	—N/a
"Sing for the Good Times"	1974	—	66	—	—N/a
"This Time the Hurtin's on Me"	1975	—	—	—	—N/a
"One the Way Home"	1975	—	—	—	—N/a
"He Little Thing'd Her Out of My Arms"	1975	—	88	—	—N/a
"Birmingham"	1976	—	—	—	—N/a
"Yours for the Taking"	1979	—	28	—	Yours for the Taking
"The Rock I'm Leaning On"	1980	—	48	—	Yours for the Taking
"Devil's Den"	1980	—	63	—	Yours for the Taking
"There Goes My Everything" (re-recording)	1981	—	—	—	Greatest Hits
"I'd Be Home on Christmas Day"	1982	—	—	—	Jack Greene Sings His Best
"The Jukebox Never Plays Sweet Home"	1983	—	98	—	—N/a
"From Cotton to Satin"	1983	—	92	—	—N/a
"Midnight Tennessee Woman"	1983	—	—	—	Jack Greene Sings His Best
"I'd Do as Much for You"	1984	—	—	—	Jack Greene Sings His Best
"Dying to Believe"	1984	—	93	—	—N/a
"If It's Love (Then Bet It All)"	1984	—	81	—	—N/a
"Looking Back Is Easier"	1985	—	—	—	—N/a
"—" denotes a recording that did not chart or was not released in that territory.

== Other charted songs ==
List of songs, with selected chart positions, showing other relevant details
Title	Year	Peak chart positions	Album	Notes
Title	Year	US Country	Album	Notes
"Wanting You But Never Having You"	1967	63	All the Time	(Note: Released as the B-side to "All the Time". The song was also written by Dallas Frazier.)
"The Key That Fits the Door"	1969	66	Back in the Arms of Love	(Note: Released as the B-side to "Back in the Arms of Love". The song appeared on the album entitled Back in the Arms of Love as well.)
"If This Is Love"	1970	14	There's a Whole Lot About a Woman; That a Man Don't Know	(Note: Released as the B-side to "The Whole World Comes to Me". The song was written by Dallas Frazier.)
"What's the Use"	1970	45	There's a Whole Lot About a Woman; That a Man Don't Know	(Note: Released as the B-side to "Something Unseen".)
"Makin' Up His Mind"	1971	13	There's a Whole Lot About a Woman; That a Man Don't Know	(Note: Released as the B-side to "There's a Whole Lot of Woman That a Man Don't Know".)
"—" denotes a recording that did not chart or was not released in that territory.
