= List of awards and nominations received by Jeannie Seely =

Jeannie Seely awards and nominations
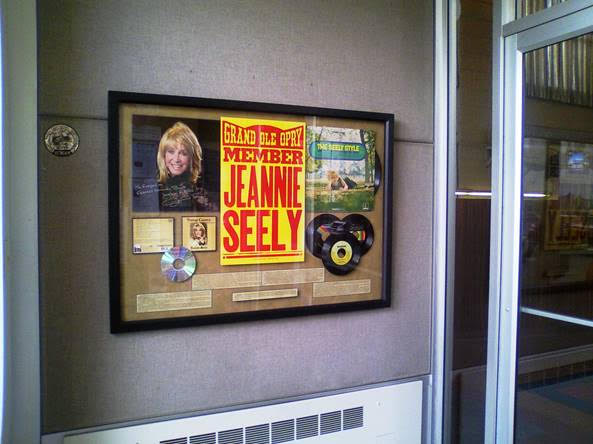
- A photo display of Seely's honors in Titusville, Pennsylvania
Awards and nominations
Award	Wins	Nominations
Country Music Association	1	4
Grammy Awards	1	2
Other honors	3	0

American singer, songwriter, and producer Jeannie Seely has received multiple awards and nominations throughout her career. Among her first awards were from music magazines Billboard, Cashbox and Record World. In 1966, she won each of their "top new female vocalist" accolades. She would be nominated for their top female artist awards over the next decade, along with further nominations in these magazines for her work with Jack Greene. In 1967, she was given by the Grammy Awards the trophy for Best Country and Western Female Vocal Performance. Although she would not win again, she would be nominated twice more over the next several decades.

Seely was nominated four times by the Country Music Association Awards for her work with Jack Greene. Between 1972 and 1975, they were nominated for the Vocal Duo of the Year trophy but never won. In 2023, Seely won the Joe Talbot Award. She has been given other honors as well. Among the first was an induction into the Grand Ole Opry in 1967, where she is still a member. She was also inducted into the North American Country Music Hall of Fame and the Music City Walk of Fame.

== Billboard magazine awards ==
Year	Nominee / work	Award	Result	Ref.
1966	Jeannie Seely	Most Promising Female Country Vocalist	Won	
1967	Jeannie Seely	Top Female Vocalist – Singles	Nominated	
1968	Jeannie Seely	Top Female Vocalist – Singles	Nominated	
1969	Jeannie Seely	Top Female Vocalist – Singles	Nominated	
1970	Jack Greene and Jeannie Seely	Top Duo's and Group Singles	Nominated	
1970	Jack Greene and Jeannie Seely	Top Duo's and Group Albums	Nominated	
1972	Jeannie Seely	Top Female Vocalist – Singles	Nominated	
1972	Jack Greene and Jeannie Seely	Top Duo & Groups – Singles	Nominated	
1973	Jeannie Seely	Top Female Vocalist – Singles	Nominated	

== Cashbox magazine awards ==
Year	Nominee / work	Award	Result	Ref.
1966	Jeannie Seely	Most Promising New C&W Female Vocalist	Won	
1967	Jeannie Seely	Top Female Vocalist	Nominated	
1972	Jack Greene and Jeannie Seely	Best Duo	Nominated	

== Country Music Association Awards ==
Year	Nominee / work	Award	Result	Ref.
1972	Jack Greene and Jeannie Seely	Vocal Duo of the Year	Nominated	
1973	Jack Greene and Jeannie Seely	Vocal Duo of the Year	Nominated	
1974	Jack Greene and Jeannie Seely	Vocal Duo of the Year	Nominated	
1975	Jack Greene and Jeannie Seely	Vocal Duo of the Year	Nominated	
2023	Jeannie Seely	Joe Talbot Award	Won	

== Grammy Awards ==
Year	Nominee / work	Award	Result	Ref.
1967	"Don't Touch Me"	Best Country and Western Vocal Performance – Female	Won	
1970	"Wish I Didn't Have to Miss You"	Best Country Performance by a Duo or Group with Vocal (with Jack Greene)	Nominated	
2002	Clinch Mountain Sweethearts	Best Bluegrass Album (credited as "Ralph Stanley and Friends")	Nominated	

== Inaugural Influencing Women Awards Gala ==
Year	Nominee / work	Award	Result	Ref.
2019	Jeannie Seely	Standing Ovation Award	Won	

== International Bluegrass Music Awards ==
Year	Nominee / work	Award	Result	Ref.
2002	Clinch Mountain Sweethearts	Recorded Event of the Year (credited as "Ralph Stanley and Friends")	Won	

== Record World magazine awards ==
Year	Nominee / work	Award	Result	Ref.
1966	Jeannie Seely	Fast Climbing Female Vocalist	Won	
1967	Jeannie Seely	Top Female Vocalist	Nominated	
1970	Jeannie Seely	Top Female Vocalist	Nominated	
1970	Jack Greene and Jeannie Seely	Top 25 Records – "Wish I Didn't Have to Miss You"	Nominated	
1972	Jack Greene and Jeannie Seely	Best Duo – Singles	Nominated	

== R.O.P.E. Awards ==
Year	Nominee / work	Award	Result	Ref.
2006	Jeannie Seely	Songwriter of the Year	Won	
2007	Jeannie Seely	Entertainer of the Year	Won	
2017	Jeannie Seely	Entertainer of the Year	Won	
2019	Jeannie Seely	D.J. of the Year	Won	

== Other honors ==
Year	Nominee / work	Award	Result	Ref.
1967	Grand Ole Opry	Induction	Inducted	
2000	North American Country Music Hall of Fame	Induction	Inducted	
2018	Music City Walk of Fame	Inducted as a member	Inducted	
2019	Lincoln Memorial University	Honorary Doctorate	Won	
