= American Classic (disambiguation) =

American Classic is a 2009 studio album by American country music artist Willie Nelson.

American Classic or America's Classics may also refer to:

- American Classic (TV series)
- U.S. Classic, annual gymnastics meet for artistic gymnasts of the United States
- An American Classic, 2020 studio album by American country artist Jeannie Seely
- America's Classics, award for restaurants from the James Beard Foundation
- The American Classic, Thunderbird flavored fortified wine

== See also ==
- Classical America (1968), classical architecture organization
- Classical Hollywood cinema
