= He Can Be Mine =

Single by Jeannie Seely
- B-side: "So Was He"
- Released: September 1974
- Genre: Country
- Length: 2:46
- Label: MCA
- Songwriter: Jeannie Seely
- Producer: Walter Haynes

Jeannie Seely singles chronology
"I Miss You" (1974)	"He Can Be Mine" (1974)	"The First Time" (1974)

"He Can Be Mine" was a song written and originally recorded by American country artist Jeannie Seely. Released as a single in 1974 by MCA Records, it reached the top 40 of the US country chart and the top 20 of the Canadian country chart. It was given reviews from both Billboard and Cashbox magazines.

== Background and recording ==
Jeannie Seely's 1966 single "Don't Touch Me" brought her to commercial stardom in the country field and over the next two decades she would have further chart success. In 1973 she signed a contract with MCA Records and her first single, "Can I Sleep in Your Arms", reached the top ten. It would be followed by several more top 40 chart entries including "He Can Be Mine". The country ballad was composed by Seely herself and featured production from Walter Haynes.

== Release, critical reception and chart performance ==
"He Can Be Mine" was released by MCA Records in September 1974. The label distributed it as a seven-inch vinyl record and it featured a B-side called "So Is He". Publications took notice of the song, with Cashbox finding a gospel arrangement on the recording and believed it would move up the record charts. Billboard called the song's lyrics "strong". "He Can Be Mine" entered the US Billboard Hot Country Songs chart on September 21, 1974, and spent 14 weeks there. On November 23, it reached the number 26 position and became her final top 40 Billboard chart entry in her career. "He Can Be Mine" also made Canada's RPM Country Tracks chart, rising into the top 20 there. Around the same period, it reached the number 13 position on the chart and was also her final single to chart there.

== Track listing ==
7" vinyl single

- "He Can Be Mine" – 2:46
- "So Was He" – 2:37

== Charts ==
=== Weekly charts ===
Weekly chart performance for "He Can Be Mine"
Char (1974)	Peak position
Canada Country Tracks (RPM)	13
US Hot Country Songs (Billboard)	26
