= Anyone Who Knows What Love Is (Will Understand) =

1964 single by Irma Thomas

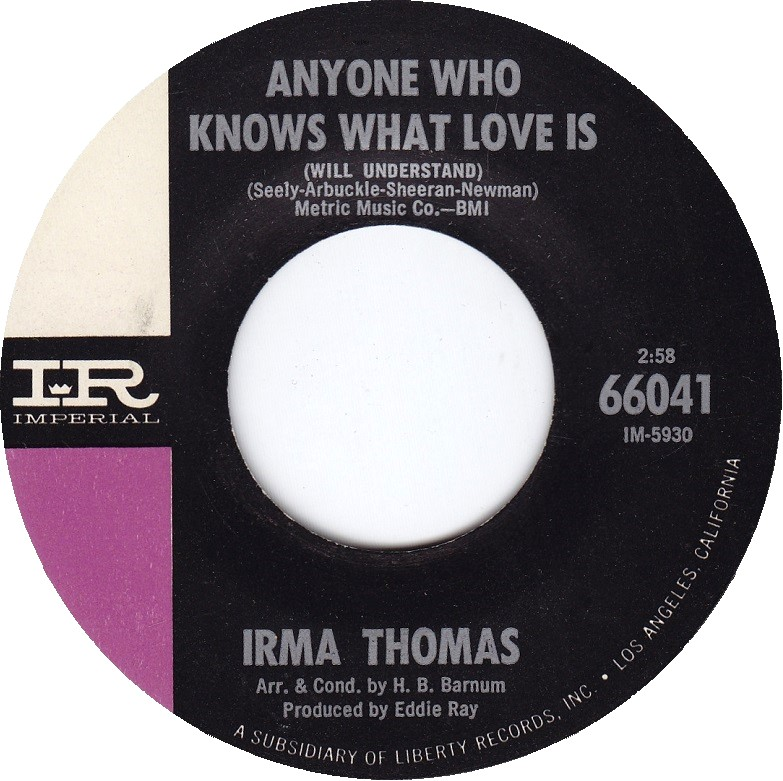
- US vinyl

Single by Irma Thomas
- B-side: "Time Is on My Side"
- Released: May 14, 1964
- Recorded: April 16, 1964
- Genre: R&B
- Length: 2:58
- Label: Imperial
- Songwriters: Judith Arbuckle, Randy Newman, Jeannie Seely, Pat Sheeran
- Producer: Eddie Ray

Irma Thomas singles chronology
"Wish Someone Would Care" (1964)	"Anyone Who Knows What Love Is (Will Understand)" (1964)	"Times Have Changed" (1964)

Audio
- "Anyone Who Knows What Love Is (Will Understand)" by Irma Thomas on YouTube

"Anyone Who Knows What Love Is (Will Understand)" is a 1964 R&B song written by Jeannie Seely, Randy Newman, Judith Arbuckle and Pat Sheeran. It was recorded by Irma Thomas and released as a single the same year, with "Time Is on My Side" as the B-side. The song is about a woman who stays in a relationship with a man despite his bad behavior.

"Time Is on My Side" soon gathered attention when a cover by the Rolling Stones became their first top ten single in the US, while "Anyone Who Knows What Love Is (Will Understand)" peaked at number 52 in the Billboard Top 100 chart.

The song was repopularised by its usage in the science fiction anthology series Black Mirror. First sung by a character for a talent show in "Fifteen Million Merits" (2011), it was used in six subsequent episodes, and began to appear in other films and television programs. In 2018, the song reached number two on Billboard's Top TV Songs. In the 2010s, musicians to cover the song included Seal, Ruby Amanfu and Boyz II Men.

== Background ==
Irma Thomas, known as the "Soul Queen of New Orleans", was born in 1941. By the age of 17, she was in her second marriage with three children, and by 19 her first single—"(You Can Have My Husband But Please) Don't Mess with My Man" (1960)—had charted on Billboard's Hot R&B Sides. Thomas moved to Minit Records and grew in public profile, including after featuring in a Coca-Cola advertisement, though none of her Minit singles charted nationally. Her first single after the label were acquired by Imperial Records, "Wish Someone Would Care" (1963), was a top 20 hit, and she began touring America. "Anyone Who Knows What Love Is (Will Understand)" was her next single. In 2006, The Guardian said that Thomas appeared to be "on the brink of a major breakthrough" during her years at Imperial, but that no breakthrough materialized. Instead, she had "medium-sized hits" during the period.

== Composition and recording ==
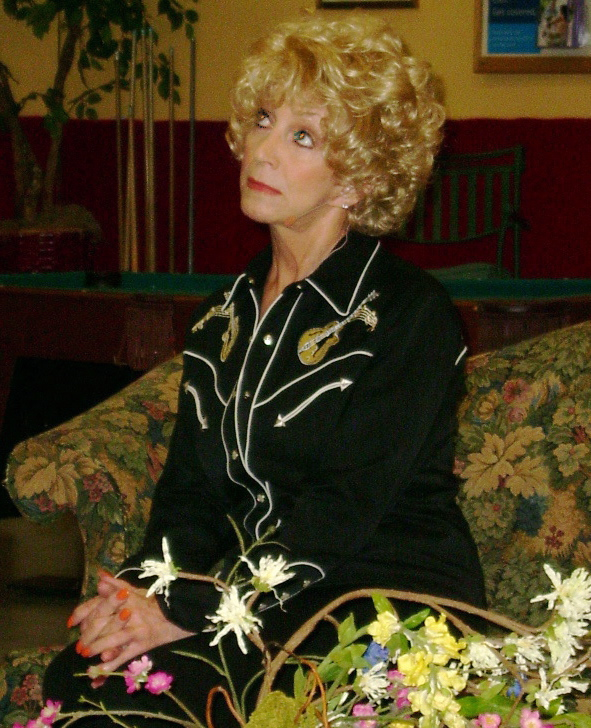
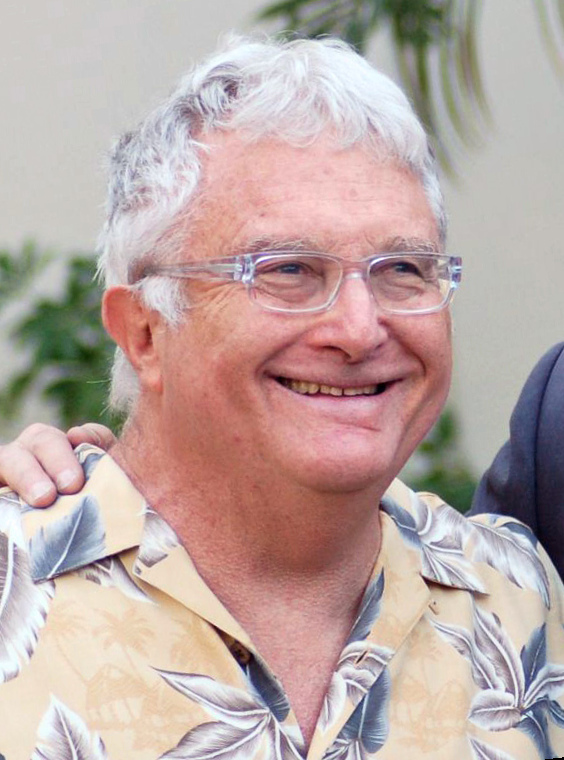
Jeannie Seely (left) and Randy Newman (right)

The song was co-written by Jeannie Seely and Randy Newman. Seely was a 23-year-old secretary at Liberty Records and conceived of the song while reading a pantyhose advert that said, "Anyone who knows what comfort is..." She stayed after work to use the label's piano, but struggled to play the chords and first verse as it sounded in her head. She asked for help from Newman, a 19-year-old songwriter. It was one of only three collaborations during his songwriting career, though he would later write songs for Thomas again—"While the City Sleeps" (1964) and "Baby Don't Look Down" (1966). The arrangement was done by H. B. Barnum; some of it is based on the Flamingos' cover of "I Only Have Eyes for You" (1959). On behalf of Seely and Newman, the music producer Eddie Ray gave the song to Thomas, who did not write her own music.

Both Seely and Newman would go on to have lengthy careers in the music industry. Seely said of the song in 2018, "I wrote the song when I was 23 ... I never thought I would still be getting royalties for it at 78". Seely first recorded herself singing it for her 2017 album Written in Song, which consisted of music she had written for other artists. She later performed it on the Grand Ole Opry.

The song was recorded by Thomas on April 16, 1964, with Barnum as the session director and conductor, Leon Russell on piano, and Jimmy Norman as the session singer. The recording process under Imperial was more involved than that of Thomas's previous discography, with use of orchestras, vocal ensembles, timpani and overdubbing. It was a few months later re-recorded in stereo for the Wish Someone Would Care album. The mono original, regarded by soul expert Dave Godin as the superior version, was re-released in 1997 on the first volume of his Deep Soul Treasures anthologies, highly acclaimed in the United Kingdom, contributing to the enduring reputation of the song.

The B-side, "Time Is on My Side", was recorded in the same session, as was "I've Been There Before" (1966). "Time Is on My Side" was originally an orchestral jazz instrumental composed by Jerry Ragavoy and recorded by trombonist Kai Winding in 1963. Norman wrote the lyrics for Thomas's gospel version during the recording, after Barnum suggested the track. The Rolling Stones covered this version the same year, and it became their first top ten single in the U.S.

== Music and lyrics ==
"Anyone Who Knows What Love Is (Will Understand)"
The titular chorus lines, sung by Irma Thomas

"Anyone Who Knows What Love Is (Will Understand)" is a rhythm and blues song with elements of Motown. It has an accompanying chorus and heavy backbeat. Cashbox described it as a "hauntingly slow beat-ballad affair", while Billboard called it a "soulful" ballad.

Newman biographer Kevin Courrier described the song as fitting the trope of "the sacrificial woman who stands by her no-good man", which is a longstanding theme in blues music. He contrasts this with the later song "While the City Sleeps", written by Newman and performed by Thomas, which "turns the tables" in describing a woman cheating on her male partner. Academic Robert Grant Price analysed it as an "anti-love love song", wherein the protagonist "sings about love's worst moments to show its sacrificial nature": though she will stay with her partner after he cheats on her and insults her, she believes it is worthwhile. Though the listener may urge her to leave her partner, it is she who pities those who have not experienced—in her own words—"what happiness love can be".

== Release ==
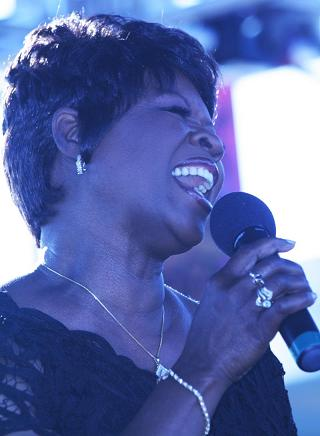
Irma Thomas in 2008

The song was first released as a single on May 14, 1964, by Imperial Records. "Anyone Who Knows What Love Is (Will Understand)" was the third of Thomas's six charting singles in the 1960s. While "Time Is on My Side" would appear on Thomas's debut album, Wish Someone Would Care (1964), "Anyone Who Knows What Love Is (Will Understand)" featured on her second album, Take a Look (1966). Both albums were also produced by Imperial.

On the Billboard Hot 100 chart in the US, the song peaked at number 52 in 1964. After its use in Black Mirror, the song peaked at number 2 on Billboard's Top TV Songs chart in 2018.

== Use in television and film ==
"Anyone Who Knows What Love Is (Will Understand)" was repopularised by its appearance in the anthology science fiction series Black Mirror. Creator Charlie Brooker chose it for "Fifteen Million Merits" (2011), as a symbol of a past era to juxtapose with the dystopian setting. Main character Bing (Daniel Kaluuya) encourages the character Abi (Jessica Brown Findlay) to enter the talent competition Hot Shot after he hears her singing the song in the bathroom. The judges are unimpressed by her rendition, but she is offered a career as a pornographic actress instead. Brooker saw the song as one of "earnest beauty", which had "the sound of a timeless haunting classic" but would not be known by most viewers. A reviewer, Paste's Katherine Connell, wrote that the song's "authenticity" against the "artificiality" of the setting is what attracts Bing to Abi.

Speaking to IndieWire in 2019, Findlay said that she was "terrified" when filming her character's performance on Hot Shot, vomiting from nervousness beforehand. The quivers in her singing voice are genuine. When Newman watched the episode, he found the song "familiar", but it took him a while to place it as his own composition. Brooker chose the song during his 2018 appearance on Desert Island Discs as one of eight recordings he would take to a desert island.

The song was reused by the production throughout the series, as a way of "nesting all the episodes together in an artistic universe of sorts", according to executive producer Annabel Jones. In the special "White Christmas" (2014), Beth (Janet Montgomery) sings it at a karaoke night; Raiman (Madeline Brewer) sings it while holding a person at gunpoint in "Men Against Fire" (2016); in "Crocodile" (2017), a man recalls the song playing at the scene where he was hit by a truck. Miley Cyrus' character Ashley O composes the song during a coma in "Rachel, Jack and Ashley Too" (2019), while the song plays in a restaurant as Joan meets her ex-boyfriend for dinner in "Joan Is Awful" (2023). The song appeared again in the show's 7th series, being sung by a motel restaurant entertainer in "Common People". Price argued in his 2019 book Black Mirror and Philosophy that in each case, the song is thematically relevant as it is sung either by or to characters who "don't know what love is".

Following its use in Black Mirror, the song began to appear more widely in film and television, for example in The Miseducation of Cameron Post (2018), The Deuce's "Inside the Pretend" (2018), Dead to Me's "I Can Handle It" (2019), a trailer for the film Jurassic World: Fallen Kingdom (2018), Bad Sisters (2022), One Day (2024), A Good Girl’s Guide to Murder (2024), and His & Hers (2026).

== Cover versions ==
The song has been covered a number of times, including by Seal and Ruby Amanfu. Boyz II Men covered the song for Under the Streetlight (2017), with Amber Riley featured on the track. In 2018, Seely credited its use across multiple genres to "the haunting melody" and "the vulnerability of the lyrics".

Seal performed the song in his cover album Standards (2017). In The Sydney Morning Herald, John Shand noted it as one of the obscure choices on the album, in contrast to other primarily "standard repertoire" material, but called it a "lame" choice. Seal said that the song sounded like the music his mother listened to in his childhood in the 1960s, and could have been sung by Dionne Warwick or Tammy Wynette, or produced by Phil Spector. Jay Cridlin of the Tampa Bay Times praised a live performance of the song with orchestral backing as a "stirring, starlit romance" with "wall-of-sound percussion".

A cover of the song opens Ruby Amanfu's 2015 cover song album Standing Still. Saeed Saeed, in The National, reviewed that Amanfu brings a "more sombre take" with her emphasis on particular lyrics, including the word "understand", which creates "an aged feel", as if Amanfu is recalling a past "romantic experience with an almost rueful smile".
