= Jeannie Seely (1969 album) =

Studio album by Jeannie Seely
- Released: April 1969
- Genre: Country
- Label: Decca
- Producer: Owen Bradley

Jeannie Seely chronology
Little Things (1969)	Jeannie Seely (1969)	Jack Greene, Jeannie Seely (1970)

Singles from Jeannie Seely
- 1. "Just Enough to Start Me Dreamin'" Released: March 1969

Jeannie Seely is an eponymous studio album by American country artist Jeannie Seely. It was released by Decca Records in April 1969 and was her fifth studio album. The 11-track collection featured songs written by Hank Cochran and others. Many of the songs were cover tunes, with some exceptions such as "Just Enough to Start Me Dreamin'". The latter was the album's only single and made an appearance on the US country chart in 1969. The eponymous release was Seely's first for the Decca label and received reviews from Billboard, Cash Box and Record World magazines.

== Background, recording and content ==
Jeannie Seely first reached commercial success in the country field with 1966's "Don't Touch Me". The song went to number two on the country chart and was followed by several more top 20 singles on Monument Records. Record World magazine announced in February 1969 that Seely had then signed with Decca Records and was recording her first-label album project with producer Owen Bradley. The eponymous studio album consisted of 11 tracks with songwriting credits from Hank Cochran, Dallas Frazier, Harlan Howard and Jim Webb. The songs "Just Enough to Start Me Dreamin'", "So Was He", "How Big a Fire" and "I'd Be Better Off" were credited to Cochran. Many of the album's tracks were cover tunes such as "Wichita Lineman", "Walkin' After Midnight" and "Until My Dreams Come True". Howard wrote the project's liner notes.

== Release, critical reception and singles ==
Jeannie Seely was released by Decca Records in April 1969 and was the fifth studio album of her career. The label distributed the album as a vinyl LP, featuring six songs on "side 1" and five songs on "side 2" of the disc. The album received reviews from music magazines in April 1969. Billboard called the LP "highly salable", writing that "Miss Seely delivers" with her performances on Cochran-penned material. Cash Box called the LP "a tempting package" and praised Seely's singing, writing that she "turns in a powerful performance with her feelingful style". Record World found all of the songs on the project to be "well-chosen" and called Seely "a top-notch country songstress". The album's only single was "Just Enough to Start Me Dreamin'", which was first issued by Decca in March 1969. It entered the US Billboard Hot Country Songs chart on March 22, 1969 and spent 11 weeks on there, peaking at the number 43 position in May 1969. It was the second single of Seely's to chart outside the Billboard country top 40.

== Track listing ==
Side one
No.	Title	Writer(s)	Length
1.	"Just Enough to Start Me Dreamin'"	Hank Cochran	2:57
2.	"Wichita Lineman"	Jim Webb	3:05
3.	"Yours Love"	Harlan Howard	2:30
4.	"So Was He"	Hank Cochran	2:37
5.	"Too Far Gone"	Billy Sherrill	3:00
6.	"How Big a Fire"	Hank Cochran	2:31

Side two
No.	Title	Writer(s)	Length
1.	"Until My Dreams Come True"	Dallas Frazier	2:34
2.	"Just Out of Reach"	"Pappy" V.F. Stewart	3:12
3.	"Walkin' After Midnight"	Alan Block; Donn Hecht	2:30
4.	"With Pen in Hand"	Bobby Goldsboro	3:45
5.	"I'll Be Better Off"	Hank Cochran; Dave Kirby	2:28

== Personnel ==
All credits are adapted from the liner notes of Jeannie Seely and an article from Record World magazine.

- Owen Bradley – Producer
- Jim Hall – Arrangement
- Harlan Howard – Liner notes
- Bill McElhiney – Arrangement

== Release history ==
Region	Date	Format	Label	Ref.
North America	April 1969	Vinyl LP (Stereo)	Decca Records	
