= Written in Song =

Written In Song

Studio album by Jeannie Seely
- Released: January 13, 2017
- Studio: Hilltop Studios
- Genre: Country
- Length: 40:18
- Label: Cheyenne
- Producer: Jeannie Seely

Jeannie Seely chronology
Vintage Country: Old But Treasured (2011)	Written In Song (2017)	An American Classic (2020)

Written In Song is the thirteenth solo studio album by American country artist Jeannie Seely. It was released on January 13, 2017 on Cheyenne Records and was produced by Seely. It is her first studio release in six years and the second to be issued on her own label. The album consisted of songs Seely composed for other artists. There are also several songs included that had not been released before.

== Background and recording ==
Jeannie Seely rose to country music success in the 1960s with the Grammy award-winning single "Don't Touch Me". Until the end of the 1970s, she found commercial success both as a solo artist and with Jack Greene. Although she turned her attention to other projects, Seely continued recording music sporadically since her peak years. Among them was 2017's Written in Song. The concept behind Written in Song came from disc jockey Eddie Stubbs and musician Kenny Sears. Seely was in search of new songs to record, which prompted Stubbs and Sears to have her look in her own catalog of songs she wrote for other people. Seely produced album by herself in the Nashville, Tennessee area, specifically at Hilltop Studios. She chose to record the album with a full band altogether in a live format. "I still like the atmosphere, I like the incentive, I like the excitement and the emotion of all of us doing it together. I am a team player, always have been," she said in 2017.

== Content ==
The album consisted of 14 tracks, all of which were written or co-written by Seely. A majority of the tracks had previously been cut by other recording artists. The second track, "He's All I Need", was first recorded by Dottie West (whom Seely composed the track with). The fourth track, "Senses", was first recorded by Willie Nelson. "Life of a Rodeo Cowboy" was about the day-to-day life of Seely's nephew, who was a working the rodeo circuit in the 1970s. Merle Haggard then went on to record it. "He's All I Need" was recorded first by Dottie West for her 1983 album New Horizons. In an interview with The Boot, Seely stated the song was inspired from a guitar player in West's band. The album also features collaborations with other artists. On "Senses", Seely is backed by Connie Smith and Marty Stuart, who harmony vocals. On the fourteenth track, "We're Still Hangin' in There Ain't We Jessi", Jessi Colter and Jan Howard are featured duet partners.

== Release and critical reception ==
Written in Song was officially released on January 13, 2017 via Cheyenne Records (Seely's own label). It was distributed in both a compact disc and in a digital format. On its release day, Seely and her management hosted a "CD release party" in Nashville to celebrate it. Written in Song was positively reviewed by music critics and journalists. Markos Papadatos of the Digital Journal praised the album's diverse array of tracks. He called the fourth track a "classic ballad" and the song "My Love for You" something "reminiscent of Bette Midler". Papadatos concluded by saying, "Overall, Jeannie Seely soars on her new album, Written in Song. "Miss Country Soul" is back stronger than ever. There is a variety on her latest musical effort. It garners an A rating." The album was also reviewed positively by the Nashville Country Club's Margaret Rogers. In the review, Rogers commented that Seely's "sultry" voice was "not lost" in the album. "Jeannie Seeley’s newest album Written in Song perfectly captures a traditional yet modern sound. She makes songs written in the 70s sound timeless and shows tribute to her roots while recording songs that are relatable today," Rogers concluded.

== Track listing ==
All tracks are composed by Jeannie Seely, except where noted.

Written in Song (CD and digital versions)
No.	Title	Writer(s)	Length
1.	"Sometimes I Do"		2:20
2.	"He's All I Need"	Seely; Dottie West	3:06
3.	"I'm Never Gonna See You"		3:25
4.	"Senses" (featuring Connie Smith and Marty Stuart)	Glen Campbell; Seely	3:04
5.	"Anyone Who Knows What Love Is (Will Understand)"	Judith Arbuckle; Randy Newman; Seely; Pat Sheeran	3:38
6.	"You Don't Need Me"		2:53
7.	"My Love For You"		2:47
8.	"Leavin' And Sayin' Goodbye" (featuring Kenny and Tessa Sears)		2:18
9.	"The Pain Once You're Gone"		2:35
10.	"He Got What He Always Wanted"		3:19
11.	"Life Of A Rodeo Cowboy"		2:40
12.	"Enough To Lie"		2:44
13.	"Who Needs You"		4:00
14.	"We're Still Hangin' In There Ain't We Jessi" (featuring Jessi Colter and Jan Howard)		3:29
Total length:			40:18

== Personnel ==
All credits are adapted from Allmusic and the liner notes of Written in Song.

Musical personnel

- Tim Atwood – piano
- Eddie Bayers – drums, mastering
- Jimmy Capps – rhythm guitar
- Jessi Colter – duet vocals
- Danny Davis – bass
- Doug Grieves – guitar
- Jan Howard – background vocals
- Kenny Sears – fiddle
- Tessa Sears – background vocals on "Leavin' And Sayin' Goodbye"
- Jeannie Seely – lead vocals, background vocals
- Connie Smith – harmony vocals
- Marty Stuart – background vocals, guitar
- Dennis Wage – keyboards
- Tommy White – steel guitar

Technical personnel

- Eddie Bayers – mastering
- Ron Harman – web service
- Chris Kagay – design
- John Nicholson – engineering
- Haley Nicole – photography
- Jeannie Seely – producer

== Release history ==
Region	Date	Format	Label	Ref.
North America	January 13, 2017	Compact disc	Cheyenne Records	
North America	January 13, 2017	Digital download; streaming	Cheyenne Records	
