= Can I Sleep in Your Arms =

Single by Jeannie Seely

from the album Can I Sleep in Your Arms/Lucky Ladies
- Released: June 1973
- Genre: Country
- Length: 3:35
- Label: MCA
- Songwriter: Hank Cochran
- Producer: Walter Haynes

Jeannie Seely singles chronology
"Farm in Pennsyltucky" (1972)	"Can I Sleep in Your Arms" (1973)	"Lucky Ladies" (1973)

"Can I Sleep in Your Arms" is a song written by Hank Cochran that was originally recorded by American country artist Jeannie Seely. Released as a single in 1973, it placed in the top ten of the US and Canadian country song charts. It also served as the title track to her 1973 studio album. The song became Seely's first top ten country single in several years and her final top ten release as well. The song was adapted from a hobo tune and a folk standard. It received reviews from several publications following its release.

== Background, composition and recording ==
Jeannie Seely first rose to country music success with the 1966 single "Don't Touch Me", a number two-charting song and a Grammy Award-winner. She had a series of top 20 (and occasionally top ten) recordings through the 1970s both as a solo artist and as a duet team with Jack Greene. Many of Seely's recordings were penned by songwriter Hank Cochran, to whom she was married at one time.

According to Seely's official website, the couple were riding on their houseboat when the idea for the song came to be. In an attempt to get Cochran's attention, Seely shouted out "can I sleep on your boat tonight mister". Cochran then wrote the lyrics for "Can I Sleep in Your Arms" based on a hobo ballad titled "May I Sleep in Your Barn Tonight Mister". The melody was then borrowed from the folk tune "Red River Valley". Cochran is given full credit on the song's recording for both words and music. The track was produced by Walter Haynes.

== Critical reception ==
"Can I Sleep in Your Arms" was given positive reviews from critics. Billboard magazine named it among its "Top Single Picks" in June 1973, writing, "When Jeannie Seely sings a Hank Cochran song, things happen. This record happens, and showcases her many abilities." Cash Box named it among its "Picks of the Week" in June 1973 and found it to sound like a "classic-sounding country ballad". The publication also highlighted "Jeannie's tender treatment and a smooth, easy-going arrangement". Music publication The Boot named it on a list of the "Top 5 Jeannie Seely Songs", placing it in the number two slot, noting its "modern sound infused with Seely's soulful vocals".

== Release, chart performance and other versions ==
"Can I Sleep in Your Arms" was released as a single by MCA Records in June 1973. It was distributed as a seven-inch vinyl single which featured a B-side titled "He'll Love the One He's With". The single debuted on the US Billboard Hot Country Songs chart on July 7, 1973 and spent a total of 18 weeks there. On October 6, it reached the number six position on the chart. "Can I Sleep in Your Arms" became Seely's first single since 1970's "Wish I Didn't Have to Miss You" (with Jack Greene) to make the country top ten and her first top ten as a solo artist since 1968's "I'll Love You More (Than You Need)". It would also be her final song to reach the Billboard country top ten. In addition, "Can I Sleep in Your Arms" reached number four on Canada's RPM Country Tracks chart, becoming her first (and only) top ten single there.

The song served as a title track to Seely's 1973 studio album Can I Sleep in Your Arms/Lucky Ladies. Seely re-recorded "Can I Sleep in Your Arms" once on her 1981 Greatest Hits album and once more on her 2020 An American Classic album. Willie Nelson covered the song for his 1975 album Red Headed Stranger and explained that the song fit with his project's conceptual themes about religion.

== Track listings ==
7" vinyl single

- "Can I Sleep in Your Arms" – 3:35
- "He'll Love the One He's With" – 2:50

== Charts ==
=== Weekly charts ===
Weekly chart performance for "Can I Sleep in Your Arms"
Chart (1973)	Peak position
Canada Country Tracks (RPM)	4
US Hot Country Songs (Billboard)	6
