= I Miss You (Jeannie Seely song) =

Single by Jeannie Seely
- B-side: "I'd Do as Much for You"
- Released: May 1974
- Genre: Country
- Length: 2:05
- Label: MCA
- Songwriter(s): Hank Cochran; Cliff Cochran
- Producer(s): Walter Haynes

Jeannie Seely singles chronology
| "Lucky Ladies" (1973) | "I Miss You" (1974) | "He Can Be Mine" (1974) |

"I Miss You" is a song written by Hank Cochran and Cliff Cochran that was recorded by American country artist Jeannie Seely. Released as a single, it reached the top 40 of the US country songs chart in 1974. It was among her final top 40 country chart entries and received reviews from both Billboard and Record World magazines.

== Background and recording ==
Jeannie Seely first rose to country music stardom with the 1966 song "Don't Touch Me". In 1973, she moved from Monument Records to MCA Records and had a top ten single with "Can I Sleep in Your Arms". It would be followed by several more chart records, including "I Miss You". Written by Hank Cochran and Cliff Cochran but produced by Walter Haynes, "I Miss You" was a ballad whose story line centered around despair.

== Release, critical reception and chart performance ==
"I Miss You" was released as a single by MCA Records in May 1974. It was distributed as a seven-inch vinyl record and included a B-side titled "I'd Do as Much for You". Billboard magazine called the single "a beautiful love ballad" and concluded that Seely "improves with each release". Record World magazine called the song "soulful and emotional, smooth and tender". The publication believed the song would become "an instant smash". "I Miss You" made its debut on the US Billboard Hot Country Songs chart on May 18, 1974. Spending ten weeks, it reached the number 37 position on July 6. It became one of Seely's final top 40 entries on the Billboard country songs chart.

== Track listing ==
7" vinyl single

- "I Miss You" – 2:05
- "I'd Do as Much for You" – 2:50

== Charts ==
=== Weekly charts ===
Weekly chart performance for "I Miss You"
| Char (1974) | Peak position |
|---|---|
| US Hot Country Songs (Billboard) | 37 |
