= Much Oblige =

Single by Jack Greene and Jeannie Seely

from the album Two for the Show
- B-side: "My Tears Don't Show"
- Released: November 1971
- Genre: Country
- Length: 2:10
- Label: Decca
- Songwriter(s): G. Deaton; R. Fulford; G. Simmons

Jack Greene singles chronology
"Hanging Over Me" (1971)	"Much Oblige" (1971)	"If You Ever Need My Love" (1972)

Jeannie Seely singles chronology
"All Right (I'll Sign the Papers)" (1971)	"Much Oblige" (1971)	"Pride" (1972)

"Much Oblige" is a song written by G. Deaton, R. Fulford and G. Simmons. It was recorded as a duet by American country music artists Jack Greene and Jeannie Seely. Released as a single in November 1971, it reached the top 20 on the US and Canadian country songs charts. The song received reviews from Billboard and Cash Box magazines following its release. It was later included on their studio album Two for the Show.

== Background, content and recording ==
Before coming together as a duet pairing, Jack Greene and Jeannie Seely had two separately-successful recording careers. In 1967, Greene first found commercial success with the chart topping country song "There Goes My Everything" while Seely had similar success with 1966's "Don't Touch Me". When both artists were on the Decca label they teamed up for the first time with the 1970 song "Wish I Didn't Have to Miss You". Together, they had more success with their next release titled "Much Oblige". The song's themes were said to evoke "spiritual" and "inspirational" messages. "Much Oblige" was composed by G. Deaton, R. Fulford and G. Simmons.

== Release, critical reception and chart performance ==
"Much Oblige" was released as a single by Decca Records in November 1971. It was distributed as a seven-inch vinyl record and included a B-side track titled "The First Day". Cash Box found the production to have "a glossy and full vocal style" along with "a perky, upbeat arrangement". Billboard predicted the song would enter their top 20 country chart and commented, "It's been too long since these top stars teamed up, but it was worth waiting for." The publication's prediction was correct when "Much Oblige" reached the number 15 position on the US Billboard Hot Country Songs top 20 in early 1972. It became the duo's second top 20 US country single together. It reached an identical position on Canada's RPM Country Tracks chart. The song then appeared on the pair's second studio album together titled Two for the Show.

== Track listings ==
7" vinyl single

- "Much Oblige" – 2:10
- "The First Day" – 2:10

== Charts ==
=== Weekly charts ===
Weekly chart performance for "Much Oblige"
Chart (1971–1972)	Peak position
Canada Country Tracks (RPM)	15
US Hot Country Songs (Billboard)	15
