= Please Be My New Love =

Studio album by Jeannie Seely
- Released: July 1970
- Genre: Country
- Label: Decca

Jeannie Seely chronology
| Jack Greene, Jeannie Seely (1970) | Please Be My New Love (1970) | Two for the Show (1973) |

Singles from Please Be My New Love
- 1. "Jeannie's Song (Medley)" Released: July 1969; 2. "Please Be My New Love" Released: January 1970

Please Be My New Love is the sixth solo studio album by American country artist Jeannie Seely. It was released by Decca Records in July 1970. The record consisted of 11 tracks, including a medley of cover tunes called "Jeannie's Medley". The latter tune and the title track were both released as singles originally. Please Be My New Love was given positive reviews by Billboard and Cash Box magazines.

== Background, recording and content ==
Jeannie Seely first found commercial success recording for Monument Records with the 1966 number two song "Don't Touch Me". The Grammy-winning single was followed by several more chart recordings during the 1960s decade. In 1969, Seely moved to Decca Records where she recorded with Jack Greene and as a solo artist. Please Be My New Love was her third studio album with the label and her second solo release following a record with Jack Greene earlier in 1970. A producer is not credited on Please Be My New Love. The album consisted of 11 tracks. Among them were two songs composed by Merle Haggard: "The Fightin' Side of Me" and Hungry Eyes". Six songs were penned by Hank Cochran, including the title track. Another song on the album titled "Jeannie's Song" was a medley of several cover tunes: "Hang Your Head in Shame", "Tomorrow Never Comes", "Fool No. 1", "Crazy", "Faded Love" and "Still". According to Seely, the medley was arranged by Owen Bradley. Seely stated it was a favorite song of hers despite having some professional disagreements with Bradley.

== Release, critical reception and singles ==
Please Be My New Love was released by Decca Records in July 1970. It was the seventh studio album released in Seely's career. Five tracks were included on "side 1" and six tracks were included on "side 2". The label distributed it as a vinyl LP. The record received positive reviews from music publications. Billboard wrote, "The heart and soul stylist comes up with another winning package of choice material," critics commented. They also praised the tracks "Jeannie's Song" and "Hungry Eyes". Cash Box believed the record would make a chart appearance and also wrote, "Devotees of Jeannie Seely will welcome the songstress’ new album venture." Two singles were part of the album, beginning with "Jeannie's Song", which was issued as a single in June 1969 by the Decca label. The second single was the title track in January 1970 and made an appearance on the US Billboard country songs chart, rising to the number 46 position. It was Seely's third single in her career to peak outside the Billboard country top 40.

== Track listing ==
Side one
| No. | Title | Writer(s) | Length |
|---|---|---|---|
| 1. | "Heart Over Mind" | Mel Tillis | 2:49 |
| 2. | "Jeannie's Song (Medley)" ("Hang Your Head in Shame", "Tomorrow Never Comes", "Fool No. 1", "Crazy", "Faded Love", "Still") | Ernest Tubb; Johnny Bond; Kathryn Fulton; Willie Nelson; John Wills; Bob Wills; Bill Anderson | 4:38 |
| 3. | "Out Loud" | Hank Cochran | 2:40 |
| 4. | "I'm Afraid I Lied" | Hank Cochran | 2:10 |
| 5. | "The Fightin' Side of Me" | Merle Haggard | 2:41 |

Side two
| No. | Title | Writer(s) | Length |
|---|---|---|---|
| 1. | "You Wouldn't Know Love" | Hank Cochran; Dave Kirby | 2:47 |
| 2. | "Is Anybody Goin' to San Antone" | Glenn Martin; Dave Kirby | 2:16 |
| 3. | "Please Be My New Love" | Hank Cochran | 2:30 |
| 4. | "Have You Found It Yet" | Hank Cochran; Red Lane | 2:38 |
| 5. | "Hungry Eyes" | Merle Haggard | 3:12 |
| 6. | "What Kind of Bird Is That" | Hank Cochran | 3:11 |

== Release history ==
| Region | Date | Format | Label | Ref. |
|---|---|---|---|---|
| North America | July 1970 | Vinyl LP (Stereo) | Decca Records | |
