= What in the World Has Gone Wrong with Our Love =

Single by Jack Greene and Jeannie Seely

from the album Two for the Show
- B-side: "Willingly"
- Released: July 1972
- Genre: Country
- Length: 2:12
- Label: Decca
- Songwriter(s): Hank Cochran; Johnny Slate

Jack Greene singles chronology
"If You Ever Need My Love" (1972)	"What in the World Has Gone Wrong with Our Love" (1972)	"Satisfaction" (1973)

Jeannie Seely singles chronology
"Pride" (1972)	"What in the World Has Gone Wrong with Our Love" (1972)	"Farm in Pennsyltucky" (1972)

"What in the World Has Gone Wrong with Our Love" is a song written by Hank Cochran and Johnny Slate. It was recorded as a duet by American country music artists Jack Greene and Jeannie Seely. It was released as a single by Decca Records in 1972, rising into the top 20 on both the US and Canadian country songs charts. It was the third and final single to make a chart appearance by the duo.

== Background, content and recording ==
Jack Greene and Jeannie Seely each had separate commercially-successful recording careers before pairing as a duet team. In 1966, Seely's single "Don't Touch Me" went to the number two position on the country chart and it was followed by several top 20 records. In 1967, Greene's single "There Goes My Everything" went to number one on the same chart and had several more chart-topping records. By the end of the decade, both artists were on Decca's roster and they began recording together. Their first single was the number two "Wish I Didn't Have to Miss You" and the pair would have two more chart singles, including "What in the World Has Gone Wrong with Our Love". The song was composed by songwriters Hank Cochran and Johnny Slate.

== Release, critical reception and chart performance ==
"What in the World Has Gone Wrong with Our Love" was released as a single by Decca Records in July 1971. It was distributed as a seven-inch vinyl record with another duet on the B-side called "Willingly". Cash Box magazine believed the song had the ability to cross over beyond country radio stations, writing, "Totally blended harmonies and contemporary lyrics are the hallmarks of this well-paced ballad that should garner MOR attention as well as c&w [country and western] exposure." The song became the duo's third and final charting record in the US and Canada, rising to the number 19 position on both the US Billboard Hot Country Songs chart and Canada's RPM Country Tracks chart. It was the included on the duo's second studio album together titled Two for the Show.

== Track listing ==
7" vinyl single

- "What in the World Has Gone Wrong with Our Love" – 2:12
- "Willingly" – 2:30

== Chart performance ==
Chart (1972)	Peak position
Country Tracks (RPM)	19
US Hot Country Songs (Billboard)	19
