= Jack Greene, Jeannie Seely =

Studio album by Jack Greene and Jeannie Seely
- Released: January 1970
- Genre: Country
- Label: Decca
- Producers: Owen Bradley; Harry Silverstein

Jack Greene chronology
| Back in the Arms of Love (1969) | Jack Greene, Jeannie Seely (1970) | Lord Is That Me (1970) |

Jeannie Seely chronology
| Jeannie Seely (1969) | Jack Greene, Jeannie Seely (1970) | Please Be My New Love (1970) |

Singles from Jack Greene, Jeannie Seely
- 1. "Wish I Didn't Have to Miss You" Released: October 1969

Jack Greene, Jeannie Seely is a studio album by American country music artists Jack Greene and Jeannie Seely. It was released by Decca Records in January 1970 and contained 11 tracks of mostly cover tunes. Although already both having two separate successful country recording careers, Greene and Seely teamed up to record an album of duets following the success of their single "Wish I Didn't Have to Miss You", which is also included. The LP received positive reviews from Billboard, Cash Box and Record World magazines.

== Background, recording and content ==
Prior to recording duets, Jack Greene and Jeannie Seely each had commercial recording careers of their own. Greene topped the country charts with 1967's "There Goes My Everything", while Seely nearly topped the country charts with 1966's "Don't Touch Me". According to writer Alan Cackett, the pair first started singing duets on Ernest Tubb's television show. Since both artists were on Decca's roster, they also started recording together. Their first duet single was "Wish I Didn't Have to Miss You". It became commercial-successful shortly afterward, prompting Decca to bring the two artists together to make an entire album of duets. Greene and Seely's first studio album was produced by Owen Bradley and Harry Silverstein. It was a collection of 11 tracks, most of which were cover tunes of country songs from the era such as "Yearning", "Willingly", "Someone I Used to Know" and "My Tears Don't Show".

== Critical reception ==
Jack Greene, Jeannie Seely received positive reviews from music magazines following its original release. Billboard believed the album would be a strong seller in the country field, finding the other tracks matching the quality of their first single. The publication also praised their versions of "Willingly" and "Everybody Knows But You and Me". Cash Box magazine had a similar finding, stating, "Jack Greene and Jeannie Seely have successfully blended their individual talents and made an album that may well be as big as the hit single it contains." Record World gave it four stars and commented that the album had received positive feedback from disc jockeys: "Whoever had the great idea of teaming these two must be beaming these days. Their partnership is paying off in record interest and busy p.a.'s."

== Release, chart performance and singles ==
Jack Greene, Jeannie Seely was released by Decca Records in January 1970. It was the tenth studio album of Greene's career and the sixth in Seely's. Decca issued the album as a vinyl LP and a cassette. Six tracks were on "side 1" while five tracks were on "side 2". The LP reached the number 18 position on the US Billboard Top Country Albums chart in early 1970. It was Greene's ninth album to make the chart and Seely's fifth to do so. The only single was "Wish I Didn't Have to Miss You", which Decca first released in October 1969. It rose to the number two position on the US country songs chart and number 21 on the Canadian country chart in 1970.

== Track listing ==
Side one
| No. | Title | Writer(s) | Length |
|---|---|---|---|
| 1. | "Love Is No Excuse" | Justin Tubb | 2:41 |
| 2. | "Yearning" | Eddings; Jones | 2:42 |
| 3. | "I Will, Always" | Don Gibson | 2:25 |
| 4. | "Someone I Used to Know" | Jack Clement | 2:27 |
| 5. | "You're Mine" | George Jones; Jack Ripley | 2:45 |
| 6. | "Wish I Didn't Have to Miss You" | Dave Kirby; Hank Cochran | 2:08 |

Side two
| No. | Title | Writer(s) | Length |
|---|---|---|---|
| 1. | "Our Chain of Love" | Willie Nelson | 2:57 |
| 2. | "Willingly" | Hank Cochran | 2:30 |
| 3. | "My Tears Don't Show" | Carl Butler | 2:52 |
| 4. | "Everybody Knows But You and Me" | Dallas Frazier | 2:40 |
| 5. | "The First Day" | Roy Baham | 2:10 |

== Technical personnel ==
All credits are adapted from the liner notes of Jack Greene, Jeannie Seely.

- Owen Bradley – producer (side 1: tracks 1, 2, 6) (side 2: tracks 3–5)
- Jack Greene – lead vocals
- Jeannie Seely – lead vocals
- Ernest Tubb – liner notes
- Harry Silverstein – producer (side 1: tracks 3–5) (side 2: tracks 1–2)

== Chart performance ==
| Chart (1970) | Peak position |
|---|---|
| US Top Country Albums (Billboard) | 18 |

== Release history ==
| Region | Date | Format | Label | Ref. |
|---|---|---|---|---|
| North America | January 1970 | Vinyl LP (Stereo); cassette | Decca Records | |
