= Don Cusic =

American writer (born 1955)

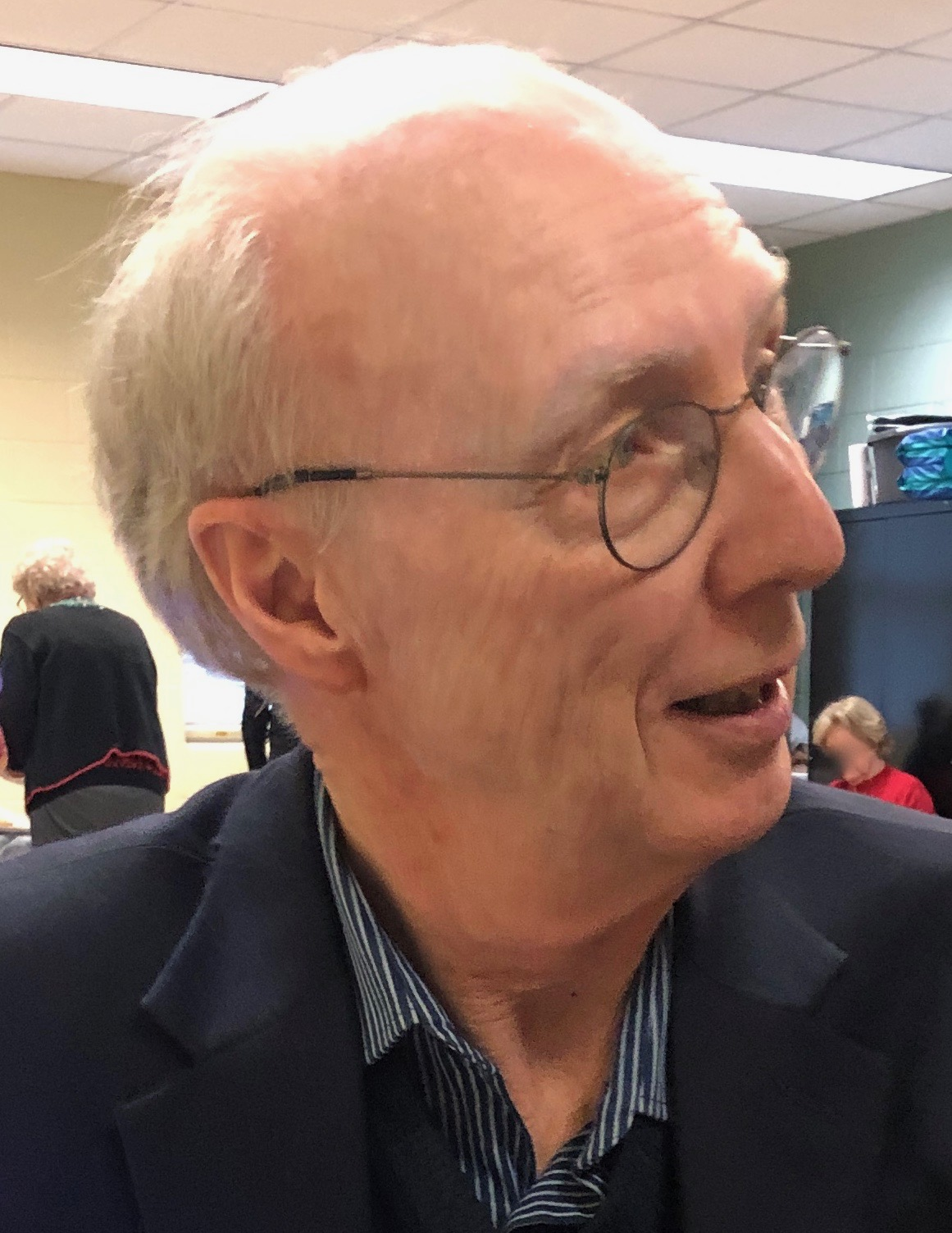
- Cusic in 2019
- Born: c. 1955 (age 70–71); Leonardtown, Maryland, U.S.
- Education: St. Mary's College, University of Maryland, Middle Tennessee State University
- Occupations: College professor, author
- Writing career
- Genres: Music, biography, history
- Subjects: United States American popular music, country music

Don Cusic (born c. 1955) is an American author, songwriter and record producer who is best known as a historian of U.S. popular music. He is the author of 28 books, most of them related to country music; they include biographies of performers like Eddy Arnold, Roger Miller, Merle Haggard and Gene Autry. He is a special correspondent for Billboard magazine, a book reviewer for MusicRow magazine, and editor for trade magazines Record World and Cashbox . Cusic was a consultant for Ken Burns' documentary miniseries Country Music. He is a Curb Professor of Music Industry History at Belmont University in Nashville, where his former students include Brad Paisley and Chris Young. He is a frequent contributor of liner notes for prominent recording artists and has contributed various encyclopedia entries, magazine articles, and book chapters.

== Early life ==
Cusic was born in the southern Maryland town of Leonardtown, the county seat of St. Mary's County, and attended Chopticon High School. He said he loved country music since he was a small boy and at age 16 he played country music in a local band. His first job was working for a local weekly newspaper in Maryland called The Enterprise . He attended St. Mary's College and graduated from the University of Maryland, College Park in 1972. He had started there as a business major but changed to journalism.

After college, he moved to Nashville with hopes of being a songwriter but became frustrated by his lack of success in the first couple of years. In a 1974 newspaper interview, Cusic recounted the difficulties was having at the time, saying "My plans haven't worked out like I thought they would, but at least I've got a foot in the industry and who knows what could happen". His "foot in the industry" was a reference to his landing a job in public relations in 1973 at the Country Music Association. Ironically, one of his duties there was returning tapes and lyrics of songs submitted by hopeful songwriters.

== Career ==
As a staff writer at the Country Music Association in 1973, he became immersed in Nashville's music scene. He eventually became country and gospel editor for two trade magazines, Record World and later Cashbox. Cusic said, "The trade magazines were really important at that time as a connection to the gatekeepers...you come in off the street knowing nobody and, when you're with a trade magazine, you're talking to the heads of [record] labels the next day...that's how I learned the music industry, really". He became a book reviewer for MusicRow Magazine and a special correspondent for Billboard. In 1977 he became head of artist development and international liaison for Monument Records and partnered with Dan Beck as an artist manager for Riders In The Sky and Dickie Lee.

By the early 1980s he felt himself drying up as a writer and enrolled in graduate courses at Middle Tennessee State University obtaining a Master's degree (1982) and a Doctor of Arts degree (1988). He accepted a faculty position at Middle Tennessee State University's Recording Industry Management Program in 1982 and in 1987 hosted a television show called "The Music Biz " as a part of the university's curriculum.

His first book (1988) was a biography of Sandi Patty, a Christian music artist. Cusic subsequently wrote biographies of country artists Eddy Arnold, Roger Miller, Elvis Presley, Gene Autry, Riders in the Sky, Randy Travis and Reba McEntire. His 2008 book, Discovering Country Music, is a history of the genre as well as an overview of the industry. He wrote biographical essays and edited books of the lyrics of Hank Williams, Merle Haggard, Johnny Cash and Willie Nelson. Cusic wrote The Beatles and Country Music, Baseball and Country Music, and Winston Churchill's Love of Music in addition to America and the American Recording Business, an overview of the recording industry. His book, Saved by Song: A History of Gospel and Christian Music (2012), was one of the first historical overviews of contemporary Christian music.

In addition to his works about music, Cusic wrote biographies of two African-Americans, James Weldon Johnson: Songwriter and The Trials of Henry Flipper, First Black Graduate of West Point. He has written two novels, Sharecropper's Son and a historical novel Dressed in Grey & Blue.

Cusic wrote liner notes on albums by Dolly Parton, Willie Nelson, George Jones, Ray Stevens, Bobby Bare, Eddy Arnold, The Oak Ridge Boys, Sonny James, Gary Paxton, George Beverly Shea, Sheb Wooley, Floyd Cramer, Skeeter Davis, Roy Drusky and others. He has also written liner notes for Sun Records 60th Anniversary Box Set; Word Gold: Five Decades of Hits; and Lift Every Voice: A Historical Collection of James Weldon Johnson Songs.

Cusic's songs have been recorded by Bobby Bare, Jeannie Seely, Chris LeDoux, Ray Stevens, Jim Ed Brown and others. He produced the Bobby Bare Album, Darker Than Light and a collection of James Weldon Johnson songs performed by Melinda Doolittle. In his career as a record Producer Cusic produced albums by Jim Ed Brown and Jeannie Seely and recordings by Peter Noone and Mandy Barnett.

In 1994, he accepted a position as Professor of Music Business at Belmont University in Nashville. Two of his former students there were Chris Young and Brad Paisley. In 2006 he received a Curb Professorship endowed by the Mike Curb Foundation.

Cusic was a consultant on Ken Burns' documentary miniseries Country Music. In this role, Cusic and other country music scholars, working over several days, sat with Burns and viewed the preliminary footage critiquing what should be included and verifying the material. Cusic appeared a number of times on CMT programs, including the "Controversy" series, "Greatest Patriotic Songs," "Waiting in the Wings: African-Americans in Country Music " and others; he appeared on a number of TNN shows, including "Life and Times of Eddy Arnold" and the A&E Biography Series (on Hank Williams). He also appeared on the BBC series "Lost Highway: The History of Country Music" and “White Gospel.” He has appeared in three films, Country Gold, Wish Me Away, the story of Chely Wright and Country: Portrait of a Music.

Cusic, along with Shannon Pollard and Cheetah Chrome is the founder of Plowboy Records, which began in 2012 as a heritage label as well as contemporary rock. Cusic served as the label's director of special projects.

Cusic is the founder of the Belmont Book Award, given annually for the best book on country music. It is presented during the International Country Music Conference which has been held at Belmont University since 1998. Previous recipients include Robert Helman (2014) for Johnny Cash: The Life; and Peter Guarlnick (2016) for Sam Phillips: The Man Who Invented Rock 'n' Roll. Cusic is co-host of the conference and is editor of the International Country Music Journal.

As of 2018, his latest book is Nashville Sound: An Illustrated Timeline. It is an extensively illustrated work that follows the development of the music industry in Nashville from the nineteenth century until modern times.

== Writings ==
=== Books ===
- 2018: Nashville Sound: An Illustrated Timeline Reedy Press
- 2018: America and the American Record Business Brackish Publishing
- 2018: Winston Churchill's Love of Music Brackish Publishing
- 2017: Living the Business by Mike Curb with Don Cusic, Brackish Publishing
- 2016: Hank Williams: The Singer and The Songs Brackish Publishing
- 2016: Buried Roots of Early Days: Bluegrass and Old Time Country Music (editor). Brackish Publishing
- 2014: Ray Stevens Nashville (editor)
- 2013: James Weldon Johnson: Songwriter. Brackish Publishing.
- 2012: Roger Miller: Dang Him. Brackish Publishing.
- 2012: Elvis and Nashville. Brackish Publishing.
- 2012: Saved by Song: A History of Gospel and Christian Music. University Press of Mississippi
- 2012: Dress in Grey & Blue: Walter Duncan's Memoirs and History of Nashville During the Civil War. Brackish Publishing.
- 2011: Sharecropper's Son (Novel). Brackish Publishing.
- 2011: The Cowboy in Country Music: An historical Survey with Artist Profiles. Jefferson, North Carolina: McFarland & Company.
- 2010: Encyclopedia of Contemporary Christian Music: Pop, Rock, and Worship (Editor). Santa Barbara, California: Greenwood Press.
- 2009: The Trials of Henry Flipper. Jefferson, North Carolina: McFarland & Company.
- 2008: Discovering Country Music. New York: Praeger.
- 2007: Gene Autry: his life and career. Jefferson, North Carolina: McFarland & Company
- 2004: Johnny Cash: the Songs. New York: Thunder's Mouth, a division of Avalon.
- 2003: Baseball and Country Music. Madison, Wisconsin: University of Wisconsin Press.
- 2003: It's the Cowboy Way: the amazing true adventures of Riders in the Sky. Lexington, KY: University Press of Kentucky.
- 2002: Merle Haggard: Poet of the Common Man. New York: Hal Leonard.
- 2002: The Sound of Light: a history of Gospel and Christian music. New York: Hal Leonard.
- 1997: Eddy Arnold: I'll Hold You in My Heart. Nashville, Tennessee: Rutledge Hill.
- 1996: Music in the Market. Bowling Green, Ohio: Bowling Green State University Popular Press.
- 1995: Willie Nelson: Lyrics 1957-1994. New York: St. Martin's Press.
- 1994: Cowboys and the Wild West: an A-Z guide from the Chisholm Trail to the Silver Screen. New York: Facts on File.
- 1993: Hank Williams: the Complete Lyrics. New York: St. Martin's Press.
- 1991: The Poet as Performer. Lanham, Maryland: University Press of America.
- 1991: Reba: Country Music's Queen. New York: St. Martin's Press.
- 1990: Randy Travis: the King of the New Country Traditionalists. New York: St. Martin's Press.
- 1988: Sandi Patti: the Voice of Gospel. New York: Doubleday.

=== Book chapters ===
- 2019: "Rubes, rednecks, and Novelty Songs: The Comedic Tradition in Country Music." In The Routledge Companion to Popular Music and Humor ed by Thomas Kitts and Nick Baxter-Moore, Routledge Press
- 2008: "Cowboys in Chicago". In: Chad Berry (ed.) The Hayloft Gang: the story of the National Barn Dance. Urbana: University of Illinois Press.
- 2007: "Music". In: Gary Hoppenstand, gen. ed.; Michael Schoenecke, vol. ed. The Greenwood Encyclopedia of World Popular Culture, Westport, CT: Greenwood; (p. 25).
- 2007: "Johnny Cash and C. S. Lewis". In: Bob Batchelor (ed.) Literary Cash, Dallas, Texas: BenBella Books; (pp. 179–187).
- 2006: "Loretta Lynn". In: Dennis and Susan Hall (eds.) Icons. Westport, CT: Greenwood Press.
- 2006: "Johnny Cash". In: Dennis and Susan Hall (eds.) Icons. Westport, CT: Greenwood Press.
- 2005: "Gene Autry in World War II". In Charles Wolfe and James Akenson (Ed.) Country Goes to War. Lexington, KY: University Press of Kentucky.
- 2002: "The Development of Gospel Music". In: Allan Moore (ed.) Cambridge Companion to Blues and Gospel Music. Cambridge, England: Cambridge University Press.
- 1999: "Baseball and Country Music". In: Peter M. Rutkoff and Alvin Hall (eds.) The Cooperstown Symposium: 1999. Jefferson, N.C.: McFarland.
- 1998: "Country Green: the money in Country Music". In: Cecelia Tichi (ed.) Reading Country Music: steel guitars, Opry stars, and honky tonk bars. Durham, N.C.: Duke University Press.

=== Selected articles ===
- 2015: "Richard Weize and Bear Family Records: A History." International Country Music Journal.
- 2016: "Country Music and Progressive Politics: Singing Cowboys, FDR and the New Deal." International Country Musical Journal.
- 2016: "A Brief History of Music Row." International Country Music Journal.
- 2017: "Kris Kristofferson: Soldier of Song." International Country Music Journal.
- 2017: "Donald Trump and Country Music. International Country Music Journal.
- 2019: "Chicago Country: Country Music in Chicago 1924-1971." International Country Music Journal.

=== Encyclopedia entries ===
- 2006: The American Gospel Music Encyclopedia. ed. William K. McNeil. Routledge Press.
- 2004: Encyclopedia of the Great Plains, ed. David J. Wishart, Lincoln: University of Nebraska Press
- 2003: Encyclopedia of Protestantism; ed. Hans J. Hillerbrand. New York: Routledge.
- 2001: Guide to United States Popular Culture; ed. Ray B. Browne and Pat Browne. Bowling Green, Ohio: Bowling Green State University Popular Press.
- 1998: The Tennessee Encyclopedia of History & Culture; a project of the Tennessee Historical Society, ed. Carroll Van West. Nashville, Tenn.: Tennessee Historical Society; Rutledge Hill Press. ISBN 1-55853-599-3
- 1998: Encyclopedia of Country Music; ed. Paul Kingsbury. New York: Oxford University Press.
