= An American Classic =

Studio album by Jeannie Seely
- Released: August 14, 2020
- Genre: Country
- Length: 45:47
- Label: Curb
- Producers: Don Cusic; Jim Ed Norman

Jeannie Seely chronology
Written in Song (2017)	An American Classic (2020)

Singles from An American Classic
- 1. "Not a Dry Eye in the House" Released: July 6, 2020; 2. "If You Could Call It That" Released: March 1, 2021; 3. "So Far, So Good" Released: February 27, 2022

An American Classic is the fourteenth solo and final studio album by American country artist Jeannie Seely. It was released by Curb Records on August 14, 2020. The 13-track collection featured a mixture of solo recordings, along with nine collaborations including Willie Nelson, Lorrie Morgan and Ray Stevens. The songs were both new tracks and cover tunes, such as "Teach Me Tonight" and "Old Flames Can't Hold a Candle to You". A total of three singles were spawned from the project, beginning with "Not a Dry Eye in the House" in 2020. An American Classic received favorable reviews following its release.

== Background ==
Jeannie Seely rose to success in the country genre during the 1960s with her Grammy award-winning single "Don't Touch Me". She remained on the US country charts until the end of the 1970s. Although she took on other projects (such as a nightclub and film career), Seely continually returned to recording new material. In 2020, she released her first studio album in three years An American Classic. The idea for the project was crafted by music historian and record producer Don Cusic. It was Cusic who brought the idea to the attention of Curb Records, which granted the album's creation.

== Recording and content ==
An American Classic was produced by Don Cusic, however one track ("Dance Tonight") was produced by Jim Ed Norman. Seely had been self-producing her most recent albums, but because Cusic was enthusiastic about the project, Seely deferred to his direction. An American Classic consisted of 13 tracks, some of which were re-recordings while others were new to Seely's catalog. Re-recordings included "Don't Touch Me" and "Can I Sleep in Your Arms". Some tracks were cover tunes such as the fourth song "Teach Me Tonight". Originally recorded by the DeCastro Sisters, Cusic encouraged Seely to find "an old song that nobody would expect to hear" her record. She also covered "Old Flames (Can't Hold a Candle to You)", which was made popular in two different versions by Joe Sun and Dolly Parton. Seely performed it as a duet with Waylon Payne, whom she had known through her association with his father Jody Payne. Another cover was Paul McCartney's "Dance Tonight", which was recorded as a duet with Ray Stevens.

Seely collaborated with eight additional music artists for An American Classic. The opening number ("So Far So Good") features harmony vocals from The Whites who often play with her on the Grand Ole Opry. She also teamed with Lorrie Morgan on the uptempo track "That's How I Roll". Vince Gill can be heard playing guitar on the track as well. Another collaborator was Bill Anderson, whom she collaborates on a cover of his composition "When Two Worlds Collide". Seely chose the song because it was among her favorite Anderson compositions. Willie Nelson joined her on the eighth track "Not a Dry Eye in the House". The song was originally recorded by its composer, Dallas Wayne. For his part, Nelson cut it separately from Seely's and can be heard playing his trigger guitar. Bluegrass performer Rhonda Vincent joined Seely on the new track "All Through Crying Over You". Seely recalled writing the song while en route to an Opry performance.

Don Cusic composed the ninth track "Peaceful Waters". The song was described on Seely's website as a "Celtic-flavored" tune that "harkens back to the British Isles roots of country music." Another new track was "If You Could Call It That", which featured Steve Wariner. The song's concept was inspired by a journal left behind by Dottie West, who was killed in a 1991 car accident and was Seely's close friend. A friend of Seely's owned West's memorabilia and found a songwriting journal that included a verse to the future song. The journal was then brought to songwriter Bobby Tomberlin, who helped finish it with Wariner.

== Release and reception ==
Professional ratings
Review scores
Source	Rating
Digital Journal	A

The announcement of An American Classic was first made public in fall 2019. The original intention was to release the album in the spring of 2020. However, the album was pushed back to summer 2020 In conjunction with Seely's 80th birthday on July 6, "Not a Dry Eye in the House" was released as a single. An American Classic was officially released on August 14, 2020, via Curb Records. The album was offered as a compact disc and as a digital release. It was followed by the release of two more singles: "If You Could Call It That" (March 1, 2021) and "So Far So Good" (February 27, 2022).

Following its release, An American Classic received positive review by writers and music critics. Tom Netherland gave the project a positive response in his story of the album's release, calling it a project full of "postcards from the heart." Netherland also added that the album's release signifies Seely's status as an important female country artist. "Seely belongs in the midst of Loretta Lynn and Kitty Wells as a member of the Country Music Hall of Fame. Like an author with pen in hand, whenever she sings, Seely adds another page in the annals of a career made legendary," he concluded. In addition, Markos Papadatos of Digital Journal gave the album a positive critical response in his review. Papadatos praised the album's eclectic mix of collaborations as well as its mix of musical styles. He concluded by giving the collection an "A" rating: "Grand Ole Opry star Jeannie Seely proves that she is like fine wine, where she only better with age and experience on her latest studio offering An American Classic."

== Track listing ==
An American Classic
No.	Title	Writer(s)	Length
1.	"So Far, So Good" (with The Whites)	Mitch Ballard; Penn Pennington	2:24
2.	"If You Could Call It That" (featuring Steve Wariner)	Bobby Tomberlin; Wariner; Dottie West	3:44
3.	"To Make a Dream Come True"	C.W. "Buddy Kalb", Jr.	3:47
4.	"Teach Me Tonight"	Sammy Cahn; Gene DePaul	3:27
5.	"Can I Sleep in Your Arms Tonight"	Hank Cochran	3:17
6.	"All Through Crying Over You" (with Rhonda Vincent)	Jeannie Seely	3:29
7.	"When Two Worlds Collide" (with Bill Anderson)	Anderson; Roger Miller	3:01
8.	"Not a Dry Eye in the House" (featuring Willie Nelson)	Dallas Wayne	3:47
9.	"Old Flames (Can't Hold a Candle to You)" (with Waylon Payne)	Hugh Moffat; Pebe Sebert	3:44
10.	"That's How I Roll" (with Vince Gill and Lorrie Morgan)	Tim Atwood; Brent Ronen	2:31
11.	"Don't Touch Me"	Cochran	3:24
12.	"Dance Tonight" (with Ray Stevens)	Paul McCartney	3:13
13.	"Peaceful Waters"	Don Cusic	5:59
Total length:			45:47

== Release history ==
Region	Date	Format	Label	Ref.
North America	August 14, 2020	Compact disc; music download; streaming	Curb Records	
