= Life's Highway (Jeannie Seely album) =

Studio album by Jeannie Seely
- Released: November 18, 2003
- Studio: Hilltop Studio
- Genre: Country; acoustic
- Length: 42:28
- Label: OMS
- Producer: Hugh Moore; Billy Troy

Jeannie Seely chronology
| Been There...Sung That! (1999) | Life's Highway (2003) | Vintage Country: Old But Treasured (2011) |

Life's Highway is the eleventh solo studio album by American country artist Jeannie Seely. It was released on November 18, 2003, by OMS Records. It was co-produced by Hugh Moore and Billy Troy. 'It was Seely's first album in several years to be released outside her own record label. The album received critical acclaim for its blend of the country, bluegrass and folk music genres.

== Background and content ==
Life's Highway was recorded at the Hilltop Studio, located in Nashville, Tennessee. The sessions were co-produced by Hugh Moore and Billy Troy. It was Seely's first album in almost ten years to not be self-produced. Although considered by some to be a bluegrass-styled project, Seely did want to call it that. "Simply out of respect for the true bluegrass artists, I wouldn't even venture to call it that. You know, I don't pretend to be able to do (bluegrass)," she said. Other writers considered the record to be an acoustic project, which Seely agreed with. The album included notable bluegrass musicians, including Sharon and Cheryl White of the group The Whites. Jesse McReynolds is also featured on the album playing the mandolin.

The album contained 13 tracks that were all newly recorded by Seely. Four tracks were new recordings by Seely. The additional songs were cover versions of recordings previously made successful by other music artists. The title track was a cover of the number one single by Steve Wariner. The fifth track, "The River", was a cover of the single originally made a hit by Garth Brooks. The eighth track, "It's a Heartache", was made most popular as a pop hit by Bonnie Tyler. The latter Seely considered to be among her favorites on the album. "In fact, to me that's the airplay cut on the album because I can see that getting people's attention and the uniqueness of it," Seely commented in a 2003 interview.

== Release and critical reception ==
Life's Highway was first released on November 18, 2003, by OMS Records in a compact disc format. The album was later released to digital retailers.

Following its release, the album received critical acclaim from many industry writers. Bob Mitchell of the Louisville Music News gave the album a positive response in his 2004 review. He believed the album to resemble country rather than bluegrass music. "Overall, this recording lacks the earthy intensity and drive that characterizes authentic traditional Bluegrass. But, make no mistake, Life's Highway is enjoyable and features some of country and bluegrass's finest musicians," Mitchell commented. The album also received a positive response from John Lupton of Country Standard Time in 2003. Lupton called the record "chuck top full of bluegrass talent."

== Track listing ==
Life's Highway
| No. | Title | Writer(s) | Original Artist | Length |
|---|---|---|---|---|
| 1. | "Life's Highway" | Richard Leigh; Roger Murrah | Steve Wariner | 3:53 |
| 2. | "The Next Voice You Hear" | Cindy Walker | Hank Snow | 3:26 |
| 3. | "Fast Movin' Train" | Bennie Boling; Billy Troy | Jeannie Seely | 2:50 |
| 4. | "I'll Be All Smiles Tonight" | A.P. Carter | Carter Family | 4:00 |
| 5. | "The River" | Garth Brooks; Victoria Shaw | Garth Brooks | 3:14 |
| 6. | "I've Got My Baby on My Mind" | Sanger D. Shafer | Connie Smith | 2:42 |
| 7. | "The Good Ol' Days" | Dolly Parton | Dolly Parton | 3:34 |
| 8. | "It's a Heartache" | Ronnie Scott; Steve Wolfe | Bonnie Tyler | 3:47 |
| 9. | "If It Ain't Love (Let's Leave It Alone)" | Dallas Frazier | Connie Smith | 2:32 |
| 10. | "Rose Upon the Riverbank" | Bob O'Donnell, Jr.; Troy | Jeannie Seely | 3:08 |
| 11. | "Roarin' and Runnin'" | Jeannie Seely | Jeannie Seely | 3:36 |
| 12. | "Cry Myself to Sleep" | Paul Kennerley | The Judds | 3:27 |
| 13. | "Call of Kentucky" | Seely | Jeannie Seely | 2:19 |

== Personnel ==
All credits are adapted from the liner notes of Life's Highway and from Allmusic.

Musical personnel

- Jim Brown – acoustic guitar
- Glen Duncan – fiddle
- Kevin Grantt – bass
- Josh Graves – dobro
- Rob Ickes – dobro
- Charlie Louvin – harmony vocals
- Jesse McReynolds – mandolin
- Hugh Moore – banjo
- Jennifer O'Brien – harmony vocals
- Bobby Osborne – harmony vocals
- Sonny Osborne – harmony vocals
- Jeannie Seely – lead vocals
- Billy Troy – guitar, harmony vocals
- Steve Wariner – acoustic guitar
- Buck White – mandolin
- Cheryl White – harmony vocals
- Sharon White – harmony vocals
- Terri Williams – vocal harmony

Technical personnel

- Valorie Cole – make-up
- David Glasser – mastering
- Beth Gwinn – cover photo
- John Nicholson – engineering
- Hugh Moore – producer
- Billy Troy – producer

== Release history ==
| Region | Date | Format | Label | Ref. |
|---|---|---|---|---|
| United States | November 18, 2003 | Compact disc | OMS | |
| United States | Unknown | Music download | OMS | |
