= Jeannie Seely =

American singer (1940–2025)

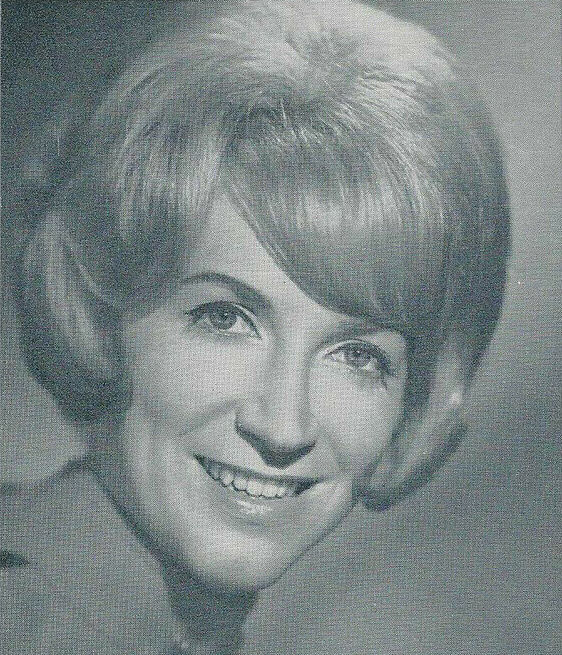
- Seely circa 1966
- Born: Marilyn Jeanne Seely; July 6, 1940; Titusville, Pennsylvania, U.S.
- Died: August 1, 2025 (aged 85); Hermitage, Tennessee, U.S.
- Occupations: Singer; songwriter; producer; author
- Years active: 1964–2025
- Works: Discography
- Spouses: Hank Cochran (m. 1969; div. 1979); Gene Ward (m. 2010; died 2024)
- Musical career
- Genres: Country; Nashville sound
- Instrument: Vocals
- Labels: Challenge; Monument; Decca/MCA; Columbia; Power Pak; Shadpoke; OMS; Cheyenne; Curb
- Website: jeannieseely.com

Marilyn Jeanne Seely (July 6, 1940 – August 1, 2025) was an American singer, songwriter, record producer, and author. Primarily identified with country music, Seely found success with the Grammy Award–winning song "Don't Touch Me" (1966). Her soul-inspired vocal delivery gave her the nickname of "Miss Country Soul". Seely was a member of and performer on the Grand Ole Opry, having appeared more times on the program than any other performer (5,397 appearances dating back to May 1966 and including 57 years as member of the Grand Ole Opry). She was credited with breaking the "Gingham Curtain," the Opry's conservative dress code for performers.

Born and raised in northwestern Pennsylvania, Seely had an early interest in country music, regularly appearing on local radio and television stations. After high school, she began a career in the banking industry and moved to California. Switching careers, she began writing songs that would be recorded by other artists. After being briefly signed with Challenge Records, she moved to Nashville, Tennessee, to further elevate her country music recording career. In Nashville, Seely's "Don't Touch Me" was released on Monument Records and reached the US country top five. She followed it with several more top-10 and -20 songs, including "A Wanderin' Man" (1967) and "I'll Love You More (Than You'll Need)" (1968).

Seely then formed a duet musical partnership with Jack Greene, and they began collaborating together in the late 1960s. Their highest-charting single was 1969's "Wish I Didn't Have to Miss You", and they subsequently toured over the next decade. Her solo career continued with the popular singles "Can I Sleep in Your Arms" (1973) and "Lucky Ladies" (1974). After a car accident in 1977, Seely's career went on a brief hiatus and then resumed new projects. This included her appearances in the Willie Nelson film Honeysuckle Rose and acting in several stage plays, opening a Nashville bar, and becoming the first woman to host the Grand Ole Opry.

In the 1990s, Seely returned to recording albums with a 1990 eponymous release, followed by her first album of Christmas music in 1994 called Number One Christmas. Her other releases included the critically acclaimed 2003 album Life's Highway. Her last studio release was 2020's An American Classic, issued on Curb Records. Seely thereafter continued to work the Grand Ole Opry and became a regular host of a weekly radio program on SiriusXM's Willie's Roadhouse broadcast.

== Early life ==
Marilyn Jeanne Seely was born on July 6, 1940, in Titusville, Pennsylvania, but raised on a farm near Townville, Pennsylvania. Seely was the youngest of four children born to Irene and Leo Seely. Her father was a farmer and worked at the Titusville Steel Mill. On weekends, he worked square dances and played the banjo. Her mother was a homemaker, but enjoyed singing around the house. Her family and friends often got together to pick and play music in Seely's childhood. They also listened to weekly Grand Ole Opry radio broadcasts during Seely's childhood.

At age 11, Seely started performing on WMGW's local radio show in Meadville, Pennsylvania, and began performing on a local television show in Erie, Pennsylvania. Seely attended Townville High School, where she was a cheerleader and an honors student. In high school, Seely was teased for singing country music and being poor. Following her 1958 high school graduation, she worked as a stenographer (and later a secretary) at the Titusville Trust Company. She also took night courses at the American Banking Institute. During this time, Seely was driving during an Easter winter storm when her car got stuck in the snow. This inspired her to move to Southern California, where the climate was warmer. In 1961, Seely left for California in her MGA Roadster convertible. She then briefly held a job at a bank in Beverly Hills, California, but realized she wanted to get more involved in the music business, prompting her to obtain a secretarial position at Imperial Records for half the pay. Seely also appeared on a local California television program titled Hollywood Jamboree.

== Career ==
=== 1964–1965: Early songwriting, first record label and Nashville ===
While working as an Imperial Records secretary, Seely started writing songs for 4 Star Records in California. One of the first compositions she wrote was "Anyone Who Knows What Love Is (Will Understand)". Accompanying herself on piano, she tracked down writer Randy Newman to help finish the song. It was picked up by rhythm and blues singer Irma Thomas, whose version made the US pop charts in 1964. This was followed by the song "Senses" (co-written with Glen Campbell), which Connie Smith cut for her 1965 album Cute 'n' Country. The same year, Dottie West cut "It Just Takes Practice" (co-written with Gail Talley) for her album Dottie West Sings. Norma Jean later recorded "Then Go Home to Her" (credited with Hank Cochran) for her 1966 album Please Don't Hurt Me.

Seely's songwriting led to her signing a recording contract with California-based Challenge Records. Her first recording sessions were held in 1964 at RCA Studio B in Nashville. From the sessions came three singles: "If I Can't Have You" (1964), "A World Without You" (1965), and "Today Is Not the Day" (1965). According to her website, Seely embarked on a US west coast tour to promote the singles, leading to her meeting songwriter Hank Cochran. Impressed by her singing, Cochran encouraged her to move to Nashville to further pursue a country career. Dottie West (who had developed a friendship with Seely) also encouraged a Nashville move, and in 1965, Seely officially left California. She then arrived at the 1965 DJ Convention in Nashville, where she saw Cochran again. Cochran then agreed to help Seely with her career, only if he were allowed to have control of her decisions. She was then hired as Norma Jean's replacement on Porter Wagoner's television series during the same period.

=== 1966–1968: "Don't Touch Me" and breakthrough ===
"Don't Touch Me"
Seely's signature song, which won a Grammy Award in 1966.

Cochran brought a demonstration tape of Seely's voice to all of Nashville's record labels, and each of them passed on signing her. According to Seely, Fred Foster of Monument Records was interested in signing her if she found a quality song to record. Now traveling as part of Porter Wagoner's road show, Seely received a phone call from Cochran while performing in Rochester, New York. Cochran performed the first verse for her on the phone and Seely agreed to hearing the remainder of the song in-person. Cochran then flew to Rochester, where he played her the remaining verses and Seely decided to record it. Cochran then brought Seely to Foster's Nashville office and he signed her to a contract with Monument. Released as a single in 1966, "Don't Touch Me" rose to number two on the US Hot Country Songs chart, number 85 on the US Hot 100 and number 29 on the US adult contemporary chart. Writers and historians have since called "Don't Touch Me" a country music standard.

Now a popular concert attraction, Seely was replaced by Dolly Parton in Porter Wagoner's road and television show. The success of "Don't Touch Me" also brought Seely the Best Female Country Vocal Performance accolade at the 9th Annual Grammy Awards. She was later invited to become a member of the Grand Ole Opry in 1967. The song led to the release of her debut studio album called The Seely Style, which rose into the top 10 on the US Top Country Albums chart in 1966. Seely's next two single releases also made the US country top 20: "It's Only Love" (1966) and "A Wanderin' Man" (1967). The latter releases (along with additional Monument tracks) were composed by Cochran, whom she married in the late 1960s. Seely paid tribute to him with her second studio LP, Thanks, Hank!, which consisted of songs all written by Cochran. The LP made the top 20 of the US country albums chart in 1967.

In the late '60s, Seely's US touring schedule increased and she traveled frequently from coast to coast. In 1967, alongside Ernest Tubb and often appeared on his country music television program. Furthermore, Seely's next single "I'll Love You More (Than You Need)" rose to number 10 on the US country chart in 1968. It served as the title track to her 1968 studio album, which climbed into US country albums top 30 in 1968. Before the end of 1968, her next two singles reached the top 40 of the Hot Country Songs chart: "Welcome Home to Nothing" and "How Is He?". Both songs appeared on her fourth studio offering Little Things, her fourth album to make the Top Country Albums chart. Commenting on her Monument recordings, writers and critics found Seely's vocals to demonstrate "raw emotion", "suffering" and "soul" while others found her singing style to steer towards pop music.

=== 1969–1977: Duets with Jack Greene and solo career comeback ===
In 1969, Seely signed with Decca Records and began recording alongside producer Owen Bradley. Her debut label single was "Just Enough to Start Me Dreamin'", which peaked outside the US country songs top 40 in 1969. The label issued her eponymous studio album in April 1969, featuring the single, along with several cover tunes. Seely also agreed to a tour of eastern Asia in January 1969, where she performed at US military bases for a total of six-weeks. She also became the host of a 30-minute radio segment on the American Armed Forces Network that attracted four million listeners and according to Billboard, made her the first female military disc jockey. Decca issued Seely's next studio album in 1970 titled Please Be My New Love, which also included mostly cover songs. Among them was the title track (which was a top-50 country single) and a medley arranged by Bradley titled "Jeannie's Song" that featured Seely singing portions of different country songs from the period.

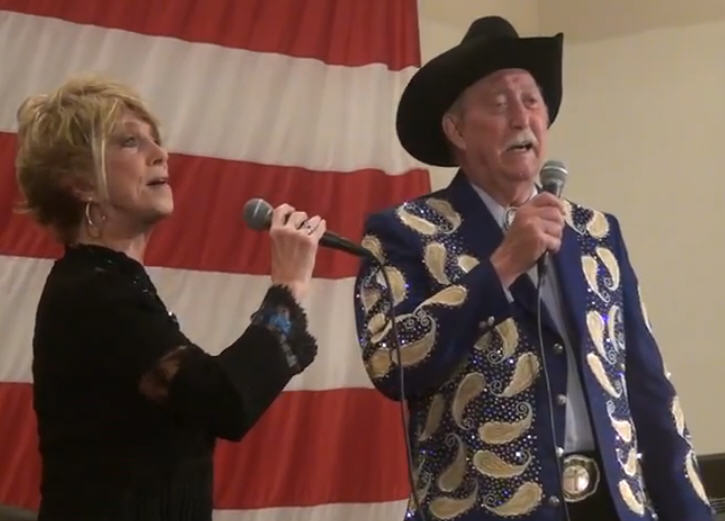
Seely and Jack Greene onstage in the early 2010s: For several years, the pair recorded and toured together.

Through Seely's association with Ernest Tubb, she formed a duet partnership with fellow Decca artist Jack Greene. The duo's first single, "Wish I Didn't Have to Miss You", reached the US country top five in 1970 and received a country duet nomination at the 12th Annual Grammy Awards. It was then featured on their 1970 studio album of duet recordings Greene and Seely then formed a road show that routinely played venues across North America and Europe, including New York City's Madison Square Garden and London's Wembley Arena. Their second duet album together, Two for the Show (1973), was named for their collaborative road appearances. The Greene-Seely duo had two more top-20 singles on the US and Canadian RPM country charts through 1973: "Much Oblige" and "What in the World Has Gone Wrong with Our Love". Greene and Seely were also nominated four times for the Country Music Association's "Vocal Duo of the Year" award between 1972 and 1975.

Seely's solo career also continued simultaneously during this period. Her solo releases through 1972 ("Tell Me Again", "You Don't Understand Him Like I Do", "Alright I'll Sign the Papers", "Pride" and "Farm in Pennsyltucky") reached lower-peaking positions on the US country chart. Yet, she found success writing Faron Young's single "Leavin' and Sayin' Goodbye", which made the country top 10 in 1972. Walter Haynes then produced Seely's 1973 single, "Can I Sleep in Your Arms". A reworked version of a traditional folk ballad, "Can I Sleep in Your Arms" reached the top 10 on both the US and Canadian country charts and became her highest-peaking single in the US since 1970. An adapted version of another folk ballad ("Come All You Fair and Tender Ladies") called "Lucky Ladies" reached the US and Canadian country songs top 20 in 1974. Both appeared on her next studio LP, Can I Sleep in Your Arms/Lucky Ladies, which also collected her previous chart singles and rose to number 15 on the US country albums chart in 1973.

Seely's next two 1974 recordings titled "I Miss You" and "He Can Be Mine" reached the US country top 40, while "He Can Be Mine" made the Canadian country top 20. She then moved to Columbia Records in 1977 where she was produced by Chuck Glaser. The label issued her last charting US country songs: "Take Me to Bed" and "We're Still Hangin' in There Ain't We Jessi". The latter recording described the marriages of country artists Jessi Colter, Jan Howard, Dottie West, and Tammy Wynette. The same year, the Greene-Seely duo released a live LP titled Live at the Grand Ole Opry. Seely's songs were again being recorded by other artists during this period. This included Merle Haggard (who recorded "Life of a Rodeo Cowboy" for his 1977 album) and Ernest Tubb (who recorded the 1977 single "Sometimes I Do") In 1977, she was injured in a car accident.

=== 1978–2009: Career setbacks, acting, and return to recording ===
Seely's career several setbacks following her car accident. Her performance opportunities became limited and she divorced Hank Cochran. Despite re-recording her duets for a 1982 album with Jack Greene, the duo ended their partnership during this period. In an interview, Seely theorized that promoters were more "loyal" to Greene, leading to him receiving more concert offers than she did. Yet, Seely did appear alongside Willie Nelson in the soundtrack of the 1980 film Honeysuckle Rose. She also started touring alongside Nelson in his "Willie Nelson and Family" show, including at the 1982 Tennessee State Fair. In 1985, she opened up a Nashville nightclub named "Jeannie Seely's Country Club". The club closed down after only a year of being open to the public. The same year, Little Jimmy Dickens released the album Country Music Hall of Fame, which was produced by Seely.

Seely then dabbled in acting, first appearing in the country music-themed musical, Takin' It Home (1986). Seely played alongside Lorrie Morgan and Jean Shepard during the show's run. In 1988, she played the character of Miss Mona in the Nashville-based Circle Players' revival of The Best Little Whorehouse in Texas. She later appeared in her first straight-acting role for the 1990 production Everybody Loves Opal. During rehearsal, she broke two of her ribs but still performed for the show's duration at a Nashville dinner theater. Seely also appeared on country music television programs during the 1980s, including interviewing performers on Opry Backstage.

In the 1980s, Seely became the first woman to host her own segment on the Opry, describing her efforts to get there as "kicking on that door". Her manager at the time, Hal Durham, had told her the reason there were no women hosts was that it was tradition; she recalled telling him, "Oh, that’s right. It’s tradition. It just smells like discrimination."

Seely returned to recording with the release of her second eponymous studio album in 1990. The 10-track project was self-produced and featured self-written compositions, along with a cover of Michael Bolton's "When I'm Back on My Feet Again". She then appeared alongside Stonewall Jackson in the 1993 music video for Confederate Railroad's "Trashy Women". Her first album of Christmas music was released in 1996 titled Number One Christmas. Consisting of spiritual holiday songs, the album was first released by the Power Pak label, but later re-released under the title Golden Christmas in 2007. Seely then released her 1999 studio album called Been There...Sung That!, an album of cover tunes that also featured Willie Nelson and T. Graham Brown. In 2001, Seely contributed to Ralph Stanley's studio album Clinch Mountain Sweethearts and followed it with her next studio album in 2003 called Life's Highway. John Lupton of Country Standard Time praised Seely's vocal contributions, calling it "classic country" and "timeless". Bob Mitchell of the Louisville Music News wrote, "Overall, this recording lacks the earthy intensity and drive that characterizes authentic traditional Bluegrass. But, make no mistake, Life's Highway is enjoyable and features some of country and bluegrass's finest musicians," he wrote.

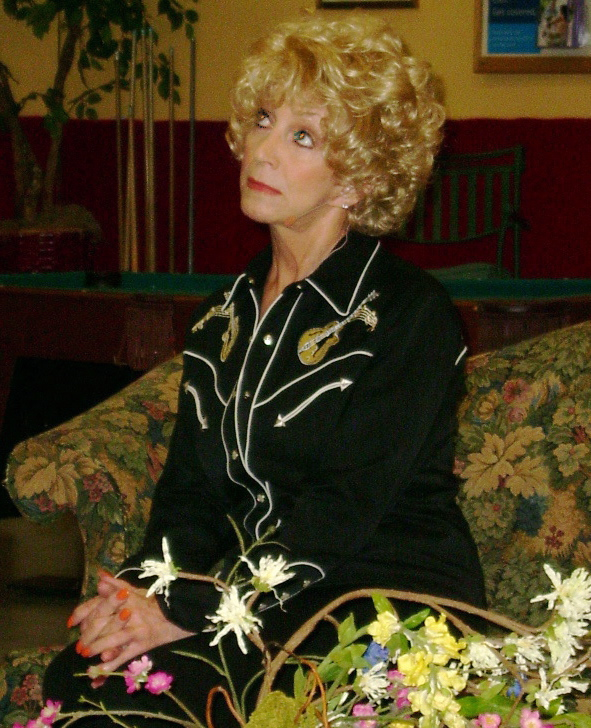
Seely started dabbling in acting during the 1980s, particularly in stage productions. In 2005, she portrayed the character of Mabel in the play Could It Be Love.

Seely also continued acting, playing the role of Louise Seger in the 2001 musical Always Patsy Cline. The show chronicled the friendship between Patsy Cline and Seger. In 2002, Seely played the role of Mrs. Jenkins in the film Changing Hearts, which starred Faye Dunaway. Seely then performed Nashville's production of the sexually themed The Vagina Monologues alongside fellow country artists Kathy Mattea and Pam Tillis. She then starred in the musical Could It Be Love from 2004–2007, which included a performance at Nashville's Ryman Auditorium. Seely portrayed an older theater actress who wanted to put on a senior-citizen version of Grease. As the 2000s continued, Seely recalled on her website playing shows at the Dollywood theme park, as well as in Ireland and on country music cruises.

=== 2010–2025: Continued recording and other projects ===
In 2010, Seely's Nashville home was destroyed in the 2010 Tennessee floods, but she resumed her career, beginning with an Opry performance shortly after the natural disaster occurred. Through her own label (Cheyenne Records), Seely issued her next studio project in 2011 called Vintage Country: Old But Treasured. Another self-produced project, Vintage Country, contained 11 tracks of traditional country songs she chose to cover. According to Seely, she named it Vintage Country after making several jokes during performances about classic country music.

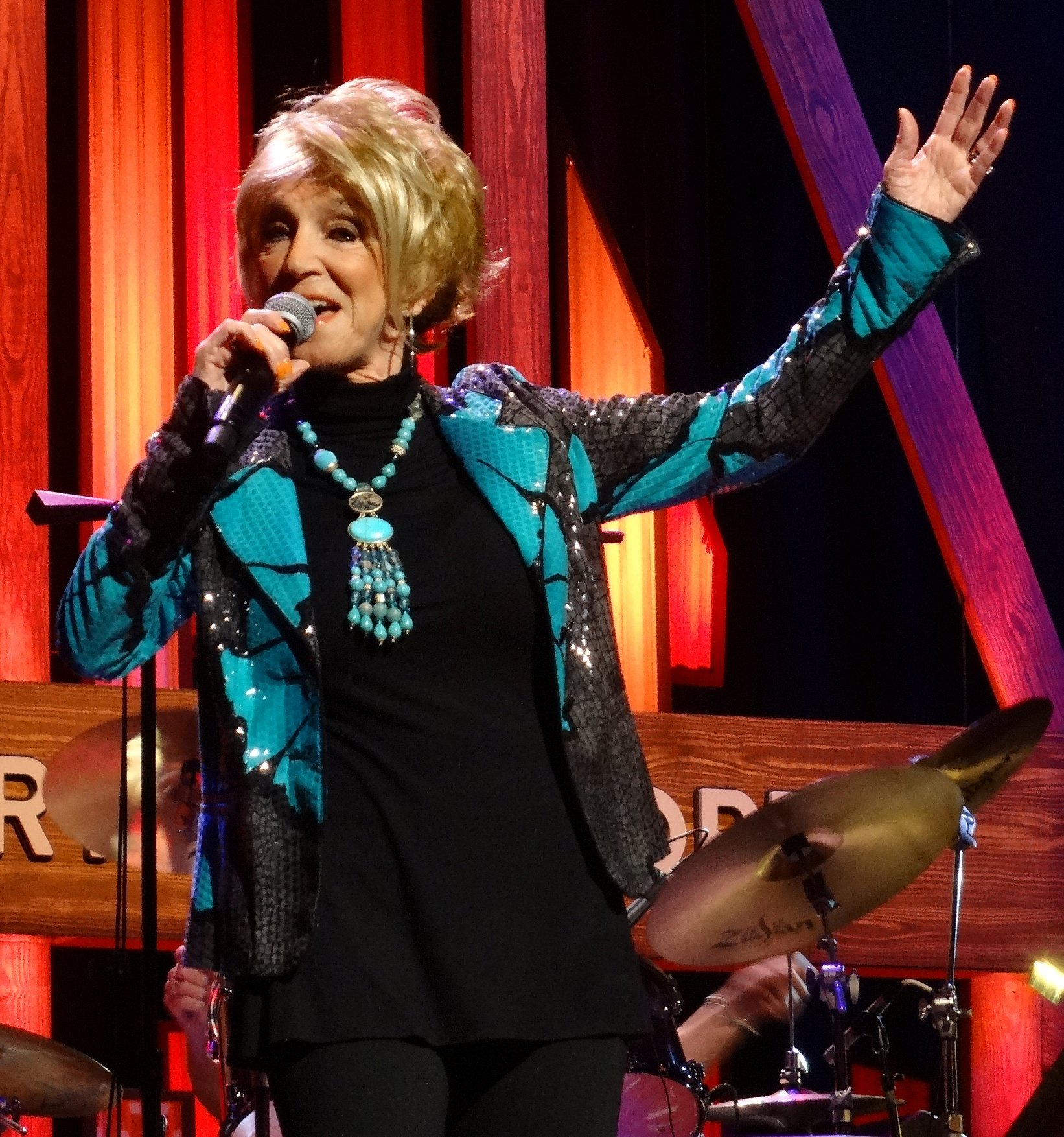
Seely at the Grand Ole Opry, 2010s

Seely maintained a continued presence at the Grand Ole Opry during the 2010s decade by performing and interviewing other artists onstage. She also made appearances at Nashville's CMA Music Festival during this period, as well. She also began hosting the "Dottie West Birthday Bash" in 2016, which is held every October in honor of West and supports the Nashville Musicians Relief Fund. Her next studio project Written in Song (2017) featured self-written songs that were first cut by other recording artists. Included were Seely's interpretations of "Anyone Knows What Love Is Will Understand", "Leaving and Saying Goodbye", and "Senses". Markos Papadatos of the Digital Journal gave the album an "A" rating and commented, "'Miss Country Soul' is back stronger than ever. There is a variety on her latest musical effort."

In 2018, it was announced that Seely would join Willie Nelson's SiriusXM radio series, Willie's Roadhouse. Her segment, titled "Sundays with Seely" then aired on the network on Sundays from noon to 4:00 pm. During her segment, Seely shares stories from her memories in Nashville and also plays songs by classic country artists. In late 2019, Seely announced her next studio offering called An American Classic. The album released in August 2020 shortly after she celebrated her 80th birthday. Produced by Don Cusic and issued on Curb Records, An American Classic included several new recordings and featured guest performers such as Willie Nelson, Rhonda Vincent, and Steve Wariner. Tom Netherland of the Bristol Herald Courier found the album cemented Seely as a significant female country artist while Markos Papadatos of Digital Journal gave the project an "A" rating. After receiving praise from singing a cover of Dottie West's "Suffertime" on the Opry, Seely went into RCA Studio B to record her own version. The song was released in July 2024, along with a corresponding video showcasing the recording process. Seely continued to perform through 2024, but made only limited appearances in the last months of her life due to health issues.

== Personal life ==
=== Marriages and homes ===
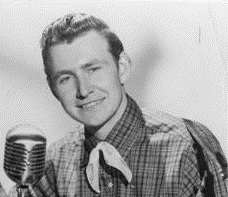
Seely was first married to songwriter Hank Cochran (pictured in 1955). It was Cochran who wrote many of her biggest hits.

Seely was married twice. Her first marriage was to her songwriter Hank Cochran, whom she officially wed on June 15, 1969, in Renfro Valley, Kentucky, in a church ceremony. Around 1975, the couple built a home set on a farm with 77 acres of property in Hendersonville, Tennessee. In the late 1970s, the couple separated and officially filed for divorce in 1979. Cochran died in 2010. Seely later stated that Cochran helped lay "the groundwork" for country music in a 2012 documentary about his life. Seely had no biological children, though she had three stepsons through her marriage to Cochran.

Seely continued to live in the farmhouse until the early 1990s, when she decided to move to a smaller cottage home, located on the Cumberland River in Nashville. It was later destroyed in the 2010 Tennessee floods. As the water started to rise in her neighborhood, Seely and her husband escaped in a pickup truck, leaving valuables behind. Seely lost most possessions in her home after three feet of water had damaged the inside. "You can either laugh about it or you can cry, and I don't feel like crying," she said in a performance shortly after losing her home. She credited the help of local volunteers with helping to clean up her home, into which she ultimately moved back.

Seely married Nashville attorney Gene Ward in 2010, as well. A year later, Seely cancelled several engagements after Ward was rushed to the hospital shortly before she was scheduled to make a Grand Ole Opry appearance. She later posted on social media that Ward's condition improved and he was able to start the recovery process. The couple renewed their wedding vows in 2019 on a country music cruise. "The reason Gene and I wanted to renew our vows is because first of all, we can...I thought it might be nice for them [her fans] to see Gene standing up there looking so sharp in his suit," she commented. Ward died on December 13, 2024, after a recent cancer diagnosis. Seely herself died eight months later.

=== Car collision ===
In June 1977, Seely was involved in a car collision in Goodlettsville, Tennessee, (located outside of Nashville) after her vehicle crashed into a tree. She was admitted to Nashville Memorial Hospital, suffering a fractured jaw, broken ribs, a punctured and collapsed lung. Upon arriving at the hospital, she was given same-day surgery to repair her lung. She was reported in "fair condition" and eventually recovered from her injuries. Friend Dottie West helped Seely following her hospital release, helping her when she was immobile and taking her on car rides for a change in scenery. Seely later reflected that the accident brought her a new appreciation for life. "You know, it sounds like a cliche, but it's true that your perspective changes when you have a close call, what you took for granted you come to appreciate more."

=== Illness and death ===
In 2024, Seely was hospitalized in Pittsburgh, Pennsylvania, after suffering from "acute diverticulitis" and "dehydration" on a trip to her hometown. She was later released and was reportedly "doing well". In May 2025, Seely said that she had multiple surgeries since March of that year, had later contracted pneumonia, and was undergoing rehabilitation. Seely died of an intestinal infection on August 1, 2025, at the age of 85. At the time of her death, she was hospitalized at TriStar Summit Medical Center in Hermitage, Tennessee.

== Artistry ==
"In 1966, Seely's 'Don't Touch Me' took country women's sexuality from the honky-tonk into the bedroom, even though it didn't end up there, and the on-again off-again ache in her voice retained its savor afterwards. But never again did she find a song at once so moral and so febrile."

— Christgau's Record Guide: Rock Albums of the Seventies (1981)

Seely's musical style categorized and identified with the country genre, while also incorporating elements of pop and soul. Critics and writers named her "Miss Country Soul" due to not only her style, but also her emotional vocal performances. Writers Robert K. Oermann and Mary A. Bufwack wrote, "Jeannie's husky cigarette-stained voice moaned with such agony" In reference to her nickname, Ken Burns of PBS called her singing "big heart" and "emotion-packed".

Seely's music also varied in subject matter. In "Don't Touch Me", Seely's character alludes to themes of sexuality and desire. Oermann and Bufwack found it to be "a throbbing song of unfulfilled passion" while The Boot's Carrie Horton found the song proved "that women can sing about sex, too". Music critic Robert Christgau also highlighted a sexually charged story line. Other songs with a similar theme included 1977's "Take Me to Bed". The subjects of Seely's other singles included heartache and love lost, such as in "It's Only Love" and "Can I Sleep in Your Arms". Other topics she explored in songs include recreational drug use, notably in "Who Needs You".

Seely was influenced by country music from an early age, beginning with an interest in the Grand Ole Opry broadcasts. She also recalled attending outdoor performance venues where country was played, notably Pennsylvania's Hillbilly Park. "I was always on the ground right in front of the front row, looking up at the stage," she recalled in her website's biography. Seely also kept photographs of country performers she was inspired by, including Little Jimmy Dickens and Jean Shepard. She also credited Ernest Tubb, along with pop singers Rosemary Clooney and Patti Page as influences on her music.

== Legacy ==
Seely has been described as an influential female country artist. According to authors Mary Bufwack and Robert K. Oermann, Seely's stage presence and personality were unlike those of her predecessors. "When she arrived in Nashville in 1965, women were still expected to portray the submissive country sweetheart. Jeannie blazed a nonconformist trail from the moment she hit the Opry stage in her miniskirt." Carrie Horton of The Boot called her career "prolific" and "influential". "From her success as a songwriter to her popularity as a duet partner to her influence as a solo artist, Seely's work has impacted generations of country, Americana, and bluegrass performers," Horton commented. Edward Morris of Country Music Television called her "one of the Opry's most applauded performers."

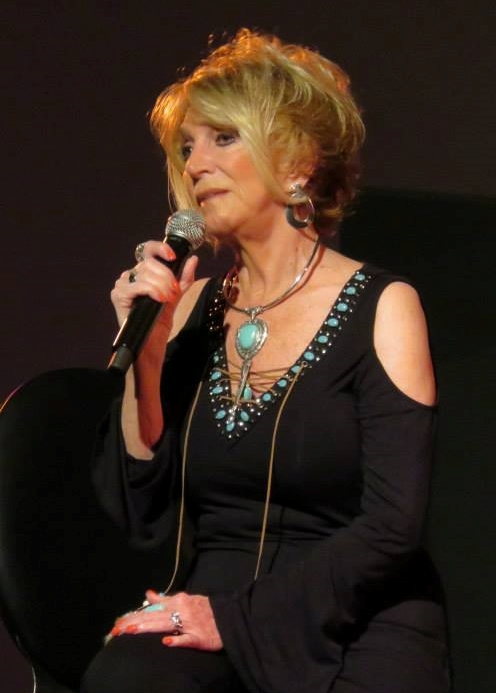
Seely onstage at R.O.P.E. awards, 2010s

Seely’s music has also been an influence on other female country artists. Lorrie Morgan has considered Seely to be influence on her music. In a 2017 interview, Morgan called her "a great lady and a very good friend of mine." Barbara Mandrell has also cited her as an influence. Carly Pearce is a third female artist that has sought inspiration from Seely. "I dreamt of singing in the Grand Ole Opry my whole life. They are so dear to me, and I hope to be a member one day. Be like Jeannie – she's kind of my inspiration as far as the Opry goes," Pearce commented.

In the 21st century, Seely received honors for her accomplishments as a recording artist and writer. Her hometown of Townville, Pennsylvania, made her a "Grand Marshall" of their community parades on several occasions. In 2017, Seely celebrated 50 years as a member of the Grand Ole Opry. She was among several women who have since been a member for 50 years. Among those have been Loretta Lynn and Dolly Parton. "The Opry has been my life for more than 50 years. I feel so blessed to be a part of this Opry family. Tonight was just the icing on the cake," she commented in 2017. The same year, Seely was recognized for her life's work at 7th annual "NATD Honors Gala", along with Charley Pride.

In 2018, Seely received a star on the Music City Walk of Fame. Also in 2018, she received an award from Billboard magazine for the composition, "Anyone Who Know What Love Is (Will Understand)". The song reached number 2 on the "Top TV Songs" chart after its appearance in the show Black Mirror. She was featured in Ken Burns's documentary Country Music in September 2019. Seely's music and career was profiled and she was also interviewed for several segments. In late 2019, she received an honorary degree from Lincoln Memorial University in Tennessee. "This is an honor that exceeds even my dreams. I could never have imagined this. I hope that I can always be deserving of this title in all that I do," she commented in her acceptance speech. Between March 2019 and February 2020, artifacts from Seely's life and career were on display at the Country Music Hall of Fame and Museum. Titled, "American Currents", her life and career was beside the work of newer Nashville artists, most notably Carly Pearce.

=== Gingham Curtain ===
Seely is credited with breaking the Gingham Curtain, the dress code for performers on the Grand Ole Opry from its inception. From 1925 until the late 1960s, the Grand Ole Opry enforced a strict conservative dress code for both men and women—one that, because of the program's heavy hand in enforcement of its rules, was nicknamed after Europe's notorious Iron Curtain dividing the Communist bloc from the west. Women wore dresses with long skirts, and were encouraged to select gingham prints to reinforce the show's country music theme. Men wore suits with cowboy boots.

After the success of Don't Touch Me, the Opry invited her to become a regular on the show. Seely had been unaware of the dress code and was told by Opry manager Ott Devine, "Honey, you’re not allowed to wear a miniskirt on the Opry". Seely challenged Opry manager Ott Devine, who disliked the idea of her wearing a miniskirt onstage. "Okay, this is what America is wearing, and I'll make you a deal. I won't wear a miniskirt in the back door if you don't let anybody wear one in the front door," she recounted in Ken Burns’ Country Music documentary. She became the first artist to wear a miniskirt on stage. Seely was also among the first female artists to wear other contemporary fashion items, including go-go boots, pantsuits, and denim jeans. According to Mary Bufwack and Robert K. Oermann, Seely "broke the Opry's gingham curtain". Seely later reflected on her choice of stage attire. "I never planned to set any sort of trend. I'm about like any other normal American girl my age. I think I dress and act pretty much the way she does," she recalled.

According to the New York Times, Seely "helped transform the image of women in country music from demure, gingham-clad helpmeet to self-possessed free spirit".

== Discography ==
Studio albums

- The Seely Style (1966)
- Thanks, Hank! (1967)
- I'll Love You More (1968)
- Little Things (1968)
- Jeannie Seely (1969)
- Jack Greene, Jeannie Seely (with Jack Greene) (1970)
- Please Be My New Love (1970)
- Two for the Show (with Jack Greene) (1973)
- Can I Sleep in Your Arms/Lucky Ladies (1973)
- Greatest Hits (re-recordings) (with Jack Greene) (1982)
- Jeannie Seely (1990)
- Number One Christmas (1996)
- Been There...Sung That! (1999)
- Life's Highway (2003)
- Vintage Country: Old But Treasured (2011)
- Written in Song (2017)
- An American Classic (2020)

== Books ==
- Pieces of a Puzzled Mind (1988)

== Acting credits ==
=== Filmography ===
| Title | Year | Role | Notes | Ref. |
|---|---|---|---|---|
| Honeysuckle Rose | 1980 | Jeannie | cameo appearance | |
| Changing Hearts | 2002 | Mrs. Jenkins | | |

=== Stage productions ===
| Title | Year | Role | Notes | Ref. |
|---|---|---|---|---|
| Takin' It Home | 1986 | Lorrie Morgan's mother | | |
| The Best Little Whorehouse in Texas | 1988 | Miss Mona | | |
| Everybody Loves Opal | 1990 | Opal | Seely's first non-musical role | |
| Always Patsy Cline | 2001 | Louise Seger | | |
| Could It Be Love | 2004–2007 | Mabel | | |
| The Vagina Monologues | 2005 | various roles | | |
