= Until My Dreams Come True =

Single by Jack Greene

from the album Until My Dreams Come True
- B-side: "We'll Try a Little Bit Harder"
- Released: November 23, 1968
- Genre: Country
- Label: Decca
- Songwriter(s): Dallas Frazier
- Producer(s): Owen Bradley

Jack Greene singles chronology
| "Love Takes Care of Me" (1968) | "Until My Dreams Come True" (1968) | "Statue of a Fool" (1969) |

"Until My Dreams Come True" is a 1969 single by Jack Greene. It was Jack Greene's fourth number one on the country charts. The single spent two weeks at number one and a total of thirteen weeks on the country chart.

== Chart performance ==
| Chart (1969) | Peak position |
|---|---|
| U.S. Billboard Hot Country Singles | 1 |
| Canadian RPM Country Tracks | 5 |
