= Wish I Didn't Have to Miss You =

Single by Jack Greene and Jeannie Seely

from the album Jack Greene, Jeannie Seely
- B-side: "My Tears Don't Show"
- Released: October 1969
- Genre: Country
- Length: 2:08
- Label: Decca
- Songwriter(s): Hank Cochran; Dave Kirby
- Producer(s): Owen Bradley

Jack Greene singles chronology
"The Key That Fits the Door" (1969)	"Wish I Didn't Have to Miss You" (1969)	"Lord Is That Me" (1969)

Jeannie Seely singles chronology
"Jeannie's Song" (1969)	"Wish I Didn't Have to Miss You" (1969)	"Please Be My New Love" (1970)

"Wish I Didn't Have to Miss You" is a song written by Hank Cochran and Dave Kirby. It was originally and released as a duet by American country music artists Jack Greene and Jeannie Seely. Released as a single in October 1969, the song became a number two song on the US country chart in early 1970. The song was given positive reviews from Billboard and Cash Box magazines and would influence the making of their debut studio album in 1970.

== Background and recording ==
Jack Greene and Jeannie Seely both had successful country music recording careers. Greene topped the country charts with 1967's "There Goes My Everything" while Seely went to number two on the country charts with 1966's "Don't Touch Me". Both performers were appearing on Ernest Tubb's television show singing duets when they were teamed up to record duets together at Decca Records. Their first single together was "Wish I Didn't Have to Miss You", which was composed by Hank Cochran and Dave Kirby. The pairing recorded the song with producer Owen Bradley. Cash Box described the song's theme as being about romance.

== Release and critical reception ==
"Wish I Didn't Have to Miss You" was released as a single by Decca Records in October 1969. It was distributed as a seven-inch vinyl single and included the B-side song, "My Tears Don't Show". Music magazines predicted the song would perform well on country and pop record charts. Billboard wrote, "This is sure to prove an immediate chart topper, both country and pop. First rate material and performance by the exciting new duo." Cash Box believed the song to be "a big winner" on the charts and found the pair "vocalized very nicely" on it.

== Chart performance and awards ==
"Wish I Didn't Have to Miss You" entered the US Billboard Hot Country Songs chart in October 1969 and spent more than ten weeks there before peaking at the number two position in early 1970. It was Greene's ninth consecutive top ten country song and Seely's third top ten single on the chart. It would also be the duo's highest-peaking single as a duet pairing on the country chart. It also made Canada's RPM Country Tracks chart, climbing to the number 21 position around the same time frame. The commercial success of "Wish I Didn't Have to Miss You" prompted Decca to record the pairing for an entire album of duets. In 1970, the duo's self-title studio album was issued and included "Wish I Didn't Have to Miss You". In 1970, the song was nominated for the Grammy Award for Best Country Performance by a Duo or Group with Vocal.

== Track listings ==
7" vinyl single

- "Wish I Didn't Have to Miss You" – 2:08
- "My Tears Don't Show" – 2:52

== Charts ==
=== Weekly charts ===
Weekly chart performance for "Wish I Didn't Have to Miss You"
Chart (1969–1970)	Peak position
Canada Country Tracks (RPM)	21
US Hot Country Songs (Billboard)	2

== Accolades ==
Year	Nominee / work	Award	Result	Ref.
1970	12th Annual Grammy Awards	Best Country Performance by a Duo or Group with Vocal	Nominated	
