= Jack Greene =

American country music singer-songwriter (1930–2013)

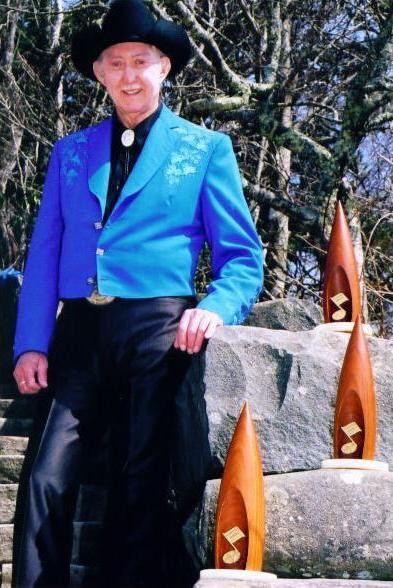

Background information
- Birth name: Jack Henry Greene
- Also known as: "The Gentle Giant" "The Jolly Greene Giant"
- Born: January 7, 1930; Maryville, Tennessee, U.S.
- Died: March 14, 2013 (aged 83); Nashville, Tennessee, U.S.
- Genres: Country
- Occupation: Singer-songwriter
- Instrument: Guitar
- Years active: 1965–2011

Jack Henry Greene (January 7, 1930 – March 14, 2013) was an American country musician. Nicknamed the "Jolly Greene Giant" due to his height and deep voice, Greene was a long time member of the Grand Ole Opry. A three-time Grammy Award nominee, Greene is best known for his 1966 hit, "There Goes My Everything". The song dominated the country music charts for nearly two months in 1967 and earned Greene "Male Vocalist of the Year", "Single of the Year", "Album of the Year", and "Song of the Year" honors from the Country Music Association. Greene had a total of five number-one country hits and three others that reached the top 10. Billboard named Greene one of the top 100 "Most Played Artists".

== Early life ==
Greene was born in Maryville, Tennessee, and learned to play guitar when he was 10 years old. His first involvement with the music industry came when he was still a teenager, working as a disc jockey at radio station WGAP in Maryville.

By the age of 18, Greene was a regular on the Tennessee Barn Dance show on WNOX (Knoxville, Tennessee). In the early 1950s, he moved to Atlanta, where he formed his own band, the Peach Tree Boys. Greene was lead vocalist, drummer, and guitarist for the group for eight years. In 1959, he moved back to Tennessee and settled in Nashville and formed another band, the Tennessee Mountain Boys. A major career break came Greene's way in 1961 when his band served as the opening act for Ernest Tubb. Impressed, Tubb asked Greene to become a part of his backing band, the Texas Troubadors, in 1962.

== Career ==
=== Success and "There Goes My Everything" ===
For the next few years, Jack Greene was a drummer, guitarist, vocalist, and master of ceremonies for the Troubadors' performances. He soon began serving as opening act on a regular basis for Tubb, as well as playing in the band. In 1964, Jack released his first solo record with The Last Letter. The song originally appeared on one of Ernest Tubb's live albums, but drew enough attention that Tubb's record label, Decca Records, released it as a single. Another single, "Don't You Ever Get Tired (Of Hurting Me)", followed in 1965, but failed to make the country music charts, having the bad luck to come out at the same time as Ray Price's version. Tubb encouraged Jack Greene to leave the Texas Troubadors and pursue a solo career. Said Greene in an interview, "Ernest told me, 'Son, I believe it's time to go.' But also said, 'If you can't make it, you can always come back and be a Troubador'."

Greene's first top-40 hit came in early 1966 with "Ever Since My Baby Went Away", peaking at number 37. Later that year, Decca released what became his signature song, "There Goes My Everything". The song reached number one and stayed on top of the country charts for seven weeks, while becoming a crossover hit. His success continued into 1967 with another number one in "All the Time" (on top for five weeks) and a number-two hit with "What Locks the Door". In 1967, he received the prestigious awards for Male Vocalist of the Year, Single of the Year, and Album of the Year from the Country Music Association. In all, he recorded nine number-one country hits on various charts, including five number-one Billboard hits. His success continued into 1968 with another number one with "You Are My Treasure" and the top-five hit "Love Takes Care of Me".

In 1969, he had two number-one hits with "Until My Dreams Come True" and "Statue of a Fool". He completed the year out with the top-five "Back in the Arms of Love". Also in 1967, Jack Greene became a member of the Grand Ole Opry. He became an Opry mainstay, performing there frequently each year until his health failed.

=== Continued success ===
In 1970, Greene gained a duet and a touring partner in Jeannie Seely. Together, they had three country hits, including "Wish I Didn't Have to Miss You", which reached number two on the charts and became Greene's last top-10 hit. Jack and Jeannie's stage show became one of the biggest touring acts during the 1970s. Jack continued to have both solo hits and duets with Seely. Among the biggest of these hits during the 1970s were "Lord, Is That Me" (1970), "There's a Lot About a Woman a Man Don't Know" (1971), and two more duets with Jeannie with "Much Obliged" (1972) and "What in The World Has Gone Wrong with Our Love" (1972).

Decca became MCA Records in the early 1970s, but Greene kept on having chart success with "Satisfaction" (1973), "I Need Somebody Bad" (1973), and "It's Time to Cross That Bridge" (1974). Afterwards, his chart success declined rapidly, as another song in 1974 and one song in 1975 were minor hits, and he was dropped by MCA Records in 1976.

=== Later career ===
Jack Greene enjoyed a brief comeback with the Frontline Records label in 1980 as the song "Yours for the Taking" peaked at number 28 on the country charts. The song was Greene's last in the country top 40. He achieved several more minor hits, however, on Frontline and then on EMH and Step One Records. He continued to tour regularly and to appear on the Grand Ole Opry program; 2007 marked his 40th anniversary with the Opry.

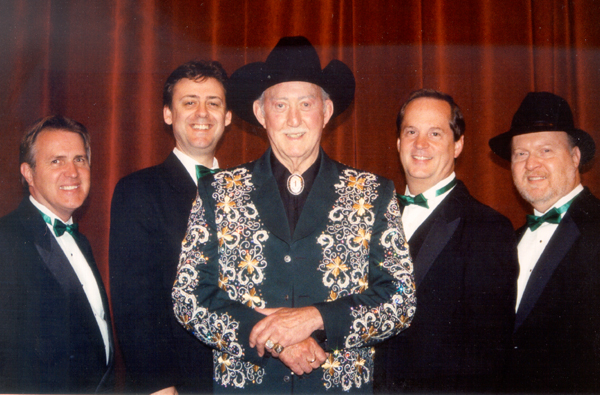
Jack and the Jolly Green Giants in 2003

== Final years and death ==
Greene continued to record sporadically in the 2000s, including the duet "You Have Won My Heart" and "Stetson Cowboy" with Santana Maria, but neither charted. Greene recorded his final studio album Precious Memories, Treasured Friends in 2010. An album of duets, it featured fellow country stars Lorrie Morgan and George Jones. In failing health, Greene retired from performing in 2011. He died on March 14, 2013, from complications of Alzheimer's disease at the age of 83 in Nashville.
