= Little Things (Jeannie Seely album) =

Studio album by Jeannie Seely
- Released: December 1968
- Studio: Bradley's Barn; Fred Foster Sound Studio
- Genre: Country
- Label: Monument
- Producer: Fred Foster; Jim Malloy

Jeannie Seely chronology
| I'll Love You More (1968) | Little Things (1968) | Jeannie Seely (1969) |

Singles from Little Things
- 1. "Welcome Home to Nothing" Released: February 1968; 2. "How Is He?" Released: June 1968; 3. "Little Things" Released: September 1968

Little Things is a studio album by American country artist Jeannie Seely. It was released in December 1968, by Monument Records and was co-produced by Fred Foster and Jim Malloy. The record was Seely's fourth studio album released in her career and included three singles issued prior to the LP: "Welcome Home to Nothing", "How Is He?" and the title track. Little Things placed inside the top 40 on the US country albums chart and received reviews from both Billboard and Cash Box magazines.

== Background, recording and content ==
Jeannie Seely had signed with Monument Records and her 1966 single "Don't Touch Me" went to number two on the country chart. With help from Hank Cochran, Seely established her career at the label recording more chart singles such as the top 20 song "A Wanderin' Man" (1967) and "I'll Love You More (Than You Need)" (1968). She later switch to Decca Records but recorded one final Monument album before leaving the label titled Little Things. The project was recorded at both Bradley's Barn and the Fred Foster Sound Studio in Tennessee. Fred Foster produced most of the album while Jim Malloy contributed to producing "Dreams of the Everyday Housewife" and the title track. Little Things consisted of 11 tracks, three of which were penned by Cochran: "Welcome Home to Nothing", "A Little Unfair" and "Leave Me Alone". "Maybe I Should Leave" was written by Seely herself, while the title track was co-written by Willie Nelson.

== Release and critical reception ==
Little Things was released by Monument Records in December 1968 and was Seely's fourth studio album in her career. It was issued as a vinyl LP, containing five tracks on "side one" and six tracks on "side two". It was later made available around 2020 to digital platforms including Apple Music. Little Things received mixed reviews from critics. AllMusic did not provide a written review, but gave the project 2.5 out of 5 possible stars. Billboard praised the album and stated, "Jeannie Seely only needs the right tune to score hard; she has several tunes here in that category." Cash Box highlighted the tracks "Harper Valley PTA" and "Just Because I'm a Woman" and found the rest of the album to offer "plenty of good listening".

== Chart performance and singles ==
Little Things rose to the number 36 position on the US Billboard Top Country Albums chart, becoming her fourth LP to make the country survey. It was also Seely's last album as a solo artist to make the Billboard country chart until 1973's Can I Sleep in Your Arms/Lucky Ladies. The album featured three singles in total. Its lead single was first issued in February 1968, "Welcome Home to Nothing". It reached number 24 on the US country songs chart later that year. It was followed in June 1968 by the second single "How Is He?" The song reached a similar position on the US country chart, rising to number 23. The title track was third and final single that was issued.

== Track listing ==
Side one
| No. | Title | Writer(s) | Length |
|---|---|---|---|
| 1. | "Little Things" | Willie and Shirley Nelson | 3:29 |
| 2. | "Just Because I'm a Woman" | D. Parton | 2:12 |
| 3. | "Maybe I Should Leave" | Jeannie Seely | 2:20 |
| 4. | "Welcome Home to Nothing" | Hank Cochran | 2:38 |
| 5. | "A Little Unfair" | H. Cochran; Chuck Howard | 2:32 |

Side two
| No. | Title | Writer(s) | Length |
|---|---|---|---|
| 1. | "Leave Me Alone" | H. Cochran | 2:38 |
| 2. | "Dreams of the Everyday Housewife" | Cris Gantry | 2:52 |
| 3. | "How Is He?" | Marijohn Wilkin | 2:00 |
| 4. | "Harper Valley PTA" | Tom T. Hall | 3:14 |
| 5. | "My Love Dies Hard" | Ed Bruce | 2:42 |
| 6. | "Long Black Limousine" | Bobby George; Vern Stovall | 3:50 |

== Technical personnel ==
All credits are adapted from the liner notes of Little Things.

- Hank Cochran – liner notes
- Fred Foster – producer
- Ken Kim – photography
- Jim Malloy – producer
- Cam Mullins – arrangementls
- Tommy Strong – engineering
- Charlie Tallent – engineering
- Mort Thomasson – engineering

== Chart performance ==
| Chart (1969) | Peak position |
|---|---|
| US Top Country Albums (Billboard) | 36 |

== Release history ==
| Region | Date | Format | Label | Ref. |
|---|---|---|---|---|
| North America | December 1968 | Vinyl LP (Stereo) | Monument | |
| North America | Circa 2020 | Music download; streaming | Sony Music Entertainment | |
