= Wilma Burgess discography =

- Studio albums: 7
- Compilation albums: 1
- Singles: 28
- Other charted songs: 1

The discography of American country artist Wilma Burgess consists of seven studio albums, one compilation album, twenty eight singles, and one other charted song. Graduating college in 1960, Burgess moved to Nashville, Tennessee to pursue a singing career. She cut her first single with United Artists Records in 1962 which had little success. Producer Owen Bradley was impressed by Burgess's vocals, signing her to a recording contract with Decca Records. In 1965, the Ray Griff-penned composition "Baby" became Burgess's breakthrough single, reaching the top ten on the Hot Country Singles chart. It was followed by a cover of Jeannie Seely's "Don't Touch Me", which reached the top twenty of the country chart. Her debut album which was also entitled Don't Touch Me (1965) and reached number three on the Billboard Top Country Albums chart.

It was Burgess's next single release "Misty Blue" that would become her biggest success and signature song. It reached the top five of the country songs chart in 1966 and would later be covered by Eddy Arnold and Dorothy Moore respectively. Her second studio album Wilma Burgess Sings Misty Blue (1966) would also peak in the top ten of the country albums chart. Burgess had her final top-twenty hit in 1967 with "Tear Time", but continued releasing albums with Decca Records until 1969. A close of friend of Jim Reeves's wife, Burgess would sign a recording contract with Reeves's Shannon label in the early 1970s. Her duet with Buddy Logan entitled "Wake Me Into Love" (1974) would reach the top twenty of the Billboard country chart. In 1977, she released two singles with RCA Records. She released her final studio album in 1982 with Could I Have This Dance and retired shortly afterward.

== Albums ==
=== Studio albums ===
List of albums, with selected chart positions and other relevant details
Title	Album details	Peak chart positions
Title	Album details	US Country
Don't Touch Me	Released: May 1966; Label: Decca Records; Format: Vinyl	3
Wilma Burgess Sings Misty Blue	Released: February 1967; Label: Decca; Format: Vinyl	5
Tear Time	Released: November 1967; Label: Decca; Format: Vinyl	36
The Tender Lovin' Country Sound of Wilma Burgess	Released: June 1968; Label: Decca; Format: Vinyl	—
Parting Is Such Sweet Sorrow	Released: June 1969; Label: Decca; Format: Vinyl	—
Wake Me Into Love (with Buddy Logan)	Released: January 1974; Label: Shannon; Format: Vinyl	—
Could I Have This Dance	Released: 1982; Label: 51-West; Format: Vinyl	—
"—" denotes a recording that did not chart or was not released in that territory.

=== Compilation albums ===
List of albums, showing relevant ideals
Title	Album details
Misty Blue	Released: 1973; Label: MCA Coral; Format: Vinyl

== Singles ==
List of singles, with selected chart positions and showing other relevant details
Title	Year	Peak chart positions	Album
Title	Year	US Country	Album
"Confused"	1962	—	—
"Raining in My Pillow"	1964	—	—
"You Can't Stop My Heart from Breaking"	1965	—	Don't Touch Me
"The Closest Thing to Love"	1965	—	Don't Touch Me
"Baby"	1965	7	Don't Touch Me
"Don't Touch Me"	1966	12	Don't Touch Me
"Misty Blue"	1966	4	Wilma Burgess Sings Misty Blue
"Fifteen Days"	1967	24	Wilma Burgess Sings Misty Blue
"Tear Time"	1967	15	Tear Time
"Watch the Roses Grow"	1968	—	The Tender Lovin' Country Sound of Wilma Burgess
"Look at the Laughter"	1968	59	Parting Is Such Sweet Sorrow
"Parting (Is Such Sweet Sorrow)"	1969	68	Parting Is Such Sweet Sorrow
"The Woman in Your Life"	1969	48	—
"The Sun's Gotta Shine"	1969	48	—
"Lonely for You"	1970	63	—
"Until My Dreams Come True"	1971	—	—
"I See Her Love All Over You"	1971	—	—
"Feelin' the Way a Woman Should"	1973	—	—
"I'll Be Your Bridge (Just Lay Me Down)"	1973	61	—
"Wake Me Into Love" (with Buddy Logan)	1973	14	Wake Me Into Love
"The Best Day of the Rest of Our Love" (with Buddy Logan)	1974	53	Wake Me Into Love
"Love Is Here"	1974	46	—
"Love Is the Foundation" (with Buddy Logan)	1975	—	Wake Me Into Love
"Baby's Not Forgotten"	1975	—	—
"Satisfied Man"	1975	—	—
"Use Me"	1977	—	—
"Once You Were Mine"	1977	—	—
"Misty Blue" (re-recording)	1983	—	—
"—" denotes a recording that did not chart or was not released in that territory.

== Other charted songs ==
List of songs, with selected chart positions and showing other relevant details
Title	Year	Peak chart positions	Notes
Title	Year	US Country	Notes
"Sweet Lovin' Baby"	1975	86	(Note: Released as the B-side to the single "Love Is Here" on Shannon Records in October of 1974. The single did not appear on any official album upon its release.)
