= Greatest Hits on Monument (Jeannie Seely album) =

Compilation album by Jeannie Seely
- Released: March 9, 1993
- Recorded: 1966–1968
- Genre: Country; country pop
- Length: 35:27
- Label: Sony Music Entertainment
- Producer: Fred Foster; Jim Malloy

Jeannie Seely chronology
Jeannie Seely (1990)	Greatest Hits on Monument (1993)	Number One Christmas (1994)

Greatest Hits on Monument is a compilation album by American country music artist Jeannie Seely. It was released on March 9, 1993, via Sony Music Entertainment. The album was comprised on Seely's original recordings for the Monument label during the 1960s. It included some of her biggest hit singles during her career. It also featured songs written Seely herself as well as other writers, predominantly the material of Hank Cochran.

== Background and content ==
Greatest Hits on Monument was a compilation of music Seely recorded while she was at Monument for three years. These recordings were among the first during her music career. It was at Monument where Seely had her first major hit, 1966's "Don't Touch Me". The song is the album's opening track and was written by Hank Cochran. Cochran wrote 11 additional tracks that are featured on the record. Included among these compositions is the track, "You Changed Everything About Me But My Name". This track was composed with Cochran and Seely. Six of the Cochran-penned songs were released as singles following the success of the "Don't Touch Me". The tracks, "It's Only Love" and "A Wanderin' Man", were top 20 hits on the Billboard Hot Country Singles chart. The album's third track, "I'll Love You More (Than You'll Need)", was a top ten hit on the same chart.

== Release and critical reception ==
Professional ratings
Review scores
Source	Rating
Allmusic	4.5/5 stars

Greatest Hits on Monument was released on March 9, 1993, via Sony Music Entertainment. The record was released in two formats: a compact disc and a cassette. Upon its release, the album did not reach any major positions on the Billboard music publication charts.

The album also received critical reception. Brian Mansfield of Allmusic gave the album 4.5 out of 5 possible stars. "These Monument recordings document only about the first three years of her career, but they include some great records, especially 'Don't Touch Me,' 'I'll Love You More (Than You Need),' and the brutally fatalistic 'It's Only Love'," he wrote.

== Track listing ==
=== Compact disc version ===
CD listing
No.	Title	Writer(s)	Length
1.	"Don't Touch Me"	Hank Cochran	3:12
2.	"When It's Over"	Cochran	2:34
3.	"I'll Love You More (Than You'll Need)"	Cochran	2:44
4.	"Everything I Had Going for Me (Is Gone)"	Cochran	2:16
5.	"Darling, Are You Ever Come Home"	Cochran; Willie Nelson	2:20
6.	"A Wanderin' Man"	Cochran	2:19
7.	"These Memories"	Cochran	2:40
8.	"It's Only Love"	Cochran	3:39
9.	"It Just Takes Practice"	Jeannie Seely	2:05
10.	"Your Way, My Way"	Cochran	2:27
11.	"You Changed Everything About Me But My Name"	Cochran; Seely	2:00
12.	"Don't You Ever Get Tired"	Cochran	2:53
13.	"Welcome Home to Nothing"	Cochran	2:16
14.	"How Is He"	Marijohn Wilkin	2:02

=== Cassette version ===
Side one
No.	Title	Writer(s)	Length
1.	"Don't Touch Me"	Cochran	3:12
2.	"When It's Over"	Cochran	2:34
3.	"I'll Love You More (Than You'll Need)"	Cochran	2:44
4.	"Everything I Had Going for Me (Is Gone)"	Cochran	2:16
5.	"Darling, Are You Ever Come Home"	Cochran; Nelson	2:20
6.	"A Wanderin' Man"	Cochran	2:19
7.	"These Memories"	Cochran	2:40

Side two
No.	Title	Writer(s)	Length
1.	"It's Only Love"	Cochran	3:39
2.	"It Just Takes Practice"	Jeannie Seely	2:05
3.	"Your Way, My Way"	Cochran	2:27
4.	"You Changed Everything About Me But My Name"	Cochran; Seely	2:00
5.	"Don't You Ever Get Tired"	Cochran	2:53
6.	"Welcome Home to Nothing"	Cochran	2:16
7.	"How Is He"	Wilkin	2:02

== Personnel ==
All credits are adapted from the liner notes of Greatest Hits on Monument.

- Earl James Carter – liner notes
- Fred Foster – producer
- Jim Malloy – producer
- Jeannie Seely – lead vocals

== Release history ==
Region	Date	Format	Label	Ref.
United States	March 9, 1993	Cassette	Sony Music Entertainment	
United States	March 9, 1993	Compact disc	Sony Music Entertainment	
