= Thanks, Hank! =

Studio album by Jeannie Seely
- Released: May 1967
- Studio: Fred Foster Sound Studio
- Genre: Country; pop
- Label: Monument
- Producer: Fred Foster

Jeannie Seely chronology
The Seely Style (1966)	Thanks, Hank! (1967)	I'll Love You More (1968)

Singles from Thanks, Hank!
- 1. "A Wanderin' Man" Released: December 1966; 2. "These Memories" Released: July 1967

Thanks, Hank! is a studio album by American country artist Jeannie Seely. It was released in May 1967, by Monument Records and was produced by Fred Foster. The album contained songs written entirely by songwriter Hank Cochran, some of which were cover tunes while others were new tracks. Among the new tracks were two singles: the top 20 country song "A Wanderin' Man" and the charting song "These Memories". The LP also made the top 20 of the US country chart. The album received reviews from AllMusic, Cash Box and Record World following its release.

== Background ==
Jeannie Seely met songwriter Hank Cochran and he helped launch her country music career. Upon moving to Nashville, Tennessee, she signed to Monument Records and Cochran wrote her first-label single in 1966, "Don't Touch Me". The song became Seely's breakthrough and Cochran would go on to write a series of songs that Seely would record. Her second studio album was titled Thanks, Hank! as a "salute" to Cochran for writing songs for and for helping to start her professional career.

== Recording and content ==
Thanks, Hank! was recorded under the production of Fred Foster at the Fred Foster Sound Studio, located in Nashville. The projected consisted of 12 tracks that were all solely-written by Cochran. Several of the songs had already been recorded by other country artists, such as two tracks by Burl Ives: "A Little Bitty Tear" and "Funny Way of Laughin'". Also included was a cover of Eddy Arnold's "Make the World Go Away" and "I Want to Go with You". Arnold also wrote a paragraph in the project's liner notes thanking Cochran. Ives did the same for Cochran. Seely herself spoke in the liner notes about Cochran and how his songs were among "the best of our era". The album also included "A Wanderin' Man", which was a new recording.

== Release and critical reception ==
Thanks, Hank! was released by Monument Records in May 1967. The label issued it as a vinyl LP, offered in both mono and stereo versions. Six tracks were included on either side of the LP. It was Seely's second studio album in her career. Budget company Harmony Records later re-released the album under the title Make the World Go Away in 1972 and only nine tracks were included. Cash Box magazine called the album a "spirited tribute" to Cochran's writing and further commented, "Jeannie Seely’s new LP should win the enthusiasm of numerous country listeners." Record World commented that "Cochran has written some of the best country songs" and gave the LP four stars in their review. AllMusic's Greg Adams gave it three out of five stars, writing, finding that "Side two bogs down a little with ballads, but closes with the ever-popular 'Make the World Go Away'."

Professional ratings
Review scores
Source	Rating
Allmusic	3/5 stars
Record World	4/5 stars

== Chart performance and singles ==
Thanks, Hank! became Seely's second LP to make the US Billboard Top Country Albums chart, rising to the number 17 position in 1967. It was one of four albums to make the top 20 on the Billboard country chart and her final one to do so until 1970. Two singles were included on the album. The lead single was "A Wanderin' Man", which was first issued by Monument Records in December 1966. It became Seely's a top 20 single on the US country songs chart, peaking at number 13 in early 1967. "These Memories" was spawned as the second single from the LP in July 1967. It became her first single to peak outside the top 40 of the US country songs chart, peaking at number 42 the same year.

== Track listing ==
All songs were composed by Hank Cochran.

=== Thanks, Hank! ===
Side one
No.	Title	Length
1.	"A Wanderin' Man"	2:25
2.	"A Little Bitty Tear"	2:05
3.	"Funny Way of Laughin'"	2:47
4.	"A Long Way from Home"	2:57
5.	"Everything I Had"	2:17
6.	"These Memories"	2:40

Side two
No.	Title	Length
1.	"I Want to Go with You"	2:26
2.	"Someone's Waiting"	2:37
3.	"I Lie a Lot"	2:23
4.	"Me Today and Her Tomorrow"	2:29
5.	"Don't You Ever Get Tired (Of Hurtin' Me)"	2:53
6.	"Make the World Go Away"	2:43

=== Make the World Go Away ===
Side one
No.	Title	Length
1.	"A Wanderin' Man"	2:25
2.	"A Little Bitty Tear"	2:05
3.	"Funny Way of Laughin'"	2:47
4.	"A Long Way from Home"	2:57
5.	"Everything I Had"	2:17

Side two
No.	Title	Length
1.	"I Lie a Lot"	2:23
2.	"Me Today and Her Tomorrow"	2:29
3.	"Don't You Ever Get Tired (Of Hurtin' Me)"	2:53
4.	"Make the World Go Away"	2:43

== Technical personnel ==
All credits are adapted from the liner notes of Thanks! Hank.

- Fred Foster – producer
- Ken Kim – photography
- Tommy Spalding – engineering
- Brent Warner – technician

== Chart performance ==
Chart (1967)	Peak position
US Top Country Albums (Billboard)	17

== Release history ==
Region	Date	Format	Label	Ref.
North America	May 1967	Vinyl LP (Mono); Vinyl LP (Stereo)	Monument	
North America	1972	Vinyl LP (Stereo)	Harmony Records	
North America	Circa 2020	Music download; streaming	Sony Music Entertainment	
