= I'll Love You More =

Studio album by Jeannie Seely
- Released: February 1968
- Studio: Fred Foster Sound Studio
- Genre: Country
- Label: Monument
- Producer: Fred Foster

Jeannie Seely chronology
Thanks, Hank! (1967)	I'll Love You More (1968)	Little Things (1968)

Singles from I'll Love You More
- 1. "When It's Over" Released: March 1967; 2. "I'll Love You More (Than You'll Need)" Released: October 1967

I'll Love You More is a studio album by American country artist Jeannie Seely. It was released by Monument Records in February 1968 and was the third studio album of her career. The project consisted of 11 tracks whose themes centered on heartbreak. Six of the songs were written by Hank Cochran, who helped launch Seely's recording career. Two of the songs were originally singles: "When It's Over" and the title track. The latter single reached the top ten on the US country songs chart in 1968. The album itself reached the top 40 of the US country albums chart following its release. It received reviews and ratings from Billboard, Cash Box and AllMusic.

== Background, recording and content ==
Jeannie Seely became professionally-associated with Hank Cochran and he helped her sign a contract with Monument Records while also writing her 1966 single "Don't Touch Me". The song was Seely's first major commercial success and was followed by several more top 20 songs through 1968, including "I'll Love You More". The latter song became the name for Seely's third studio album. The studio project was recorded by produced Fred Foster at the Fred Foster Sound Studio in Nashville, Tennessee.

I'll Love You More was a collection of 11 tracks, whose themes centered on heartbreak. Six of the album's tracks were written by Cochran: the title track, "I'd Be Just as Lonely There", "When It's Over", "Your Way My Way", "A Little Unfair" and "You Changed Everything About Me But My Name". The latter was co-written with Seely. The album also features a cover of the track "If My Heart Had Windows" and Willie Nelson's "Mr. Record Man".

== Release, reception, chart performance and singles ==
Professional ratings
Review scores
Source	Rating
Allmusic	3/5 stars

I'll Love You More was released by Monument Records in February 1968 and was offered as a vinyl LP in stereo format. Five tracks were featured on "side one" while six tracks were featured on "side two" of the disc. It was the third studio album of Seely's career. The album received reviews from music magazines following its release. Billboard praised her delivery of the songs on the album. "Jeannie Seely's way with songs of heartbreak is well demonstrated in this fine album," the publication wrote. Cash Box highlighted Seely's voice as well, finding that she performed "soulful renditions" of the project's cover tunes. The website AllMusic rated the album three out of five stars but did not provide a written review.

I'll Love You More rose to the number 30 position on the US Billboard Top Country Albums chart, becoming her third LP to reach the country chart and her lowest-peaking to date. Two singles were included on the LP, beginning with "When It's Over", which was issued nearly a year prior, in March 1967. It reached number 39 on the US country songs chart. The title track was then issued as a single in October 1967, reaching number ten on the US country songs chart in early 1968.

== Track listing ==
Side one
No.	Title	Writer(s)	Length
1.	"I'll Love You More (Than You'll Need)"	H. Cochran	2:45
2.	"I'd Be Just as Lonely There"	H. Cochran	2:42
3.	"When It's Over"	H. Cochran	2:03
4.	"I'm Still Not Over You"	Willie Nelson	4:15
5.	"If My Heart Had Windows"	Dallas Frazier	3:07

Side two
No.	Title	Writer(s)	Length
1.	"Mr. Record Man"	Willie Nelson	2:43
2.	"Your Way, My Way"	H. Cochran	2:42
3.	"A Little Unfair"	H. Cochran; C. Howard	2:35
4.	"You Changed Everything About Me But My Name"	H. Cochran; J. Seely	2:30
5.	"Don't Say Love or Nothing"	Willie Nelson	2:46
6.	"Grass Won't Grow on a Busy Street"	Ray Pennington	2:50

== Technical personnel ==
All credits are adapted from the liner notes of I'll Love You More.

- Fred Foster – producer
- Bill Forshee – cover
- Ken Kim – photography
- Brent Maher – technician
- Tommy Strong – engineering

== Chart performance ==
Chart (1968)	Peak position
US Top Country Albums (Billboard)	30

== Release history ==
Region	Date	Format	Label	Ref.
North America	February 1968	Vinyl LP (Stereo)	Monument	
United Kingdom	February 1968	Vinyl LP (Stereo)	Monument	
North America	Circa 2020	Music download; streaming	Sony Music Entertainment	
