= Welcome Home to Nothing =

Single by Jeannie Seely

from the album Little Things
- B-side: "Maybe I Should Leave"
- Released: February 1968
- Genre: Country
- Length: 2:11
- Label: Monument
- Songwriter(s): Hank Cochran
- Producer(s): Fred Foster

Jeannie Seely singles chronology
"I'll Love You More (Than You Need)" (1967)	"Welcome Home to Nothing" (1968)	"How Is He?" (1968)

"Welcome Home to Nothing" is a song written by Hank Cochran that was originally recorded by American country artist Jeannie Seely. Released as a single by Monument Records, it reached the top 40 of the US country songs chart in 1968. It was given a positive review from Cash Box magazine following its release and was included on her studio album Little Things.

== Background and recording ==
Jeannie Seely rose to country music stardom with 1966's "Don't Touch Me". The top ten song penned by Hank Cochran won her a Grammy award and launched her music career. Cochran penned many of Seely's follow-up top 40 singles including 1968's "Welcome Home to Nothing". Described as an up-tempo recording, the song was produced by Fred Foster.

== Release, critical reception and chart performance ==
"Welcome Home to Nothing" was released as a single by Monument Records in February 1968. It was distributed by Monument as a seven-inch vinyl record and included a B-side called "Maybe I Should Leave" (which was written by Seely). The song received a positive review from Cashbox magazine who called it a "well-done bouncer" and predicted it would impact the record charts. In May 1968, Cash Box named the song one Monument Records's highest-selling records that quarter. "Welcome Home to Nothing" debuted on the US Billboard Hot Country Songs chart on February 24, 1968, and spent 12 weeks on the chart. Eventually, the song reached the top 30 on the chart, peaking at number 24 on April 20. It became her sixth top 40 single on the US country chart. It was included on Seely's next studio album release Little Things.

== Track listing ==
7" vinyl single

- "Welcome Home to Nothing" – 2:11
- "Maybe I Should Leave" – 2:15

== Charts ==
=== Weekly charts ===
Weekly chart performance for "Welcome Home to Nothing"
Char (1968)	Peak position
US Hot Country Songs (Billboard)	24
