= How Is He? =

Single by Jeannie Seely

from the album Little Things
- B-side: "A Little Unfair"
- Released: June 1968
- Genre: Country
- Length: 2:00
- Label: Monument
- Songwriter: Marijohn Wilkin
- Producer: Fred Foster

Jeannie Seely singles chronology
"Welcome Home to Nothing" (1968)	"How Is He?" (1968)	"Little Things" (1968)

"How Is He?" is a song written by Marijohn Wilkin that was originally recorded by American country artist Jeannie Seely. Released as a single by Monument Records, it reached the top 40 of the US country songs chart in 1968. It was given a positive review from music magazines following its release and was included on her studio album Little Things.

== Background and recording ==
Jeannie Seely's 1966 single "Don't Touch Me" launched her country music career, becoming a top ten single and winning her an accolade from the Grammy Awards. A series of follow-up releases would follow on Monument Records including the 1968 song "How Is He?". The song featured orchestral production and was described a ballad. "How Is He?" was composed by Marijohn Wilkin, featured production by Fred Foster and string arrangements by Cam Mullins.

== Release, critical reception and chart performance ==
"How Is He?" was issued as a single by Monument Records in June 1968. It was distributed as a seven-inch vinyl record featuring a B-side titled "A Little Unfair". The song received a positive response from Cash Box magazine who called it "perhaps the prettiest thing she's done yet." Furthermore Billboard magazine thought the song had a lot of "heart and soul" and predicted it would make their country songs' top 20. "How Is He?" debuted on the US Billboard Hot Country Songs chart on June 22, 1968, and spent ten weeks on the chart. The song reached the top 30 on the chart, peaking at number 23 on August 3. It became her seventh top 40 single on the US country chart. It was included on Seely's next studio album release Little Things.

== Track listing ==
7" vinyl single

- "How Is He?" – 2:00
- "A Little Unfair" – 2:35

== Charts ==
=== Weekly charts ===
Weekly chart performance for "How Is He?"
Char (1968)	Peak position
US Hot Country Songs (Billboard)	23
