= The Seely Style =

Studio album by Jeannie Seely
- Released: September 1966
- Genre: Country; pop
- Label: Monument
- Producer: Fred Foster

Jeannie Seely chronology
The Seely Style (1966)	Thanks, Hank! (1967)

Singles from The Seely Style
- 1. "Don't Touch Me" Released: March 1966; 2. "It's Only Love" Released: September 1966

The Seely Style is the debut studio album of American country artist Jeannie Seely. It was released in September 1966 by Monument Records and was produced by Fred Foster. The album consisted of 12 songs, many of which were covers of songs from the era including some written by Hank Cochran. The lead single, "Don't Touch Me" was also penned by Cochran and became Seely's first commercial success as a recording artist. The album itself reached the top ten on the US country chart. Both Billboard and Cash Box reviewed the album following its original release.

== Background ==
Jeannie Seely had started as a songwriting before having a brief recording contract with Challenge Records. Once moving to Nashville, Tennessee in 1965, Seely received support from songwriter Hank Cochran, who helped launch her career. Cochran brought Seely to see producer Fred Foster, who signed her to his label, Monument Records. Cochran and Seely were then given the task of finding a song that Foster could record. Ultimately, Cochran wrote a song for Seely called "Don't Touch Me", which help build the sound and style of her first Monument studio album.

== Recording and content ==
The Seely Style was produced entirely by Fred Foster and consisted of 12 tracks in total. The album's liner notes describe its musical style as being Blue-eyed soul, which helped coin the album's name The Seely Style. Six of the songs on the collection were written or co-written by Hank Cochran. Among them was "Then Go Home to Her", which he co-wrote with Seely. Two more were the new recordings "Don't Touch Me" and "It's Only Love". Additionally, Seely is credited with Gail Talley on the track "It Just Takes Practice". Many of the album's songs were cover tunes, such as "I Fall to Pieces" and "Put It Off Until Tomorrow".

== Release and critical reception ==
The Seely Style was released by Monument Records in September 1966 and was her debut studio album. The label distributed the album as a vinyl LP, offered in both mono and stereo versions. Six tracks were available on each side of the disc. The album received reviews from music magazines following its release. Billboard magazine wrote, "Miss Seely has a sure-fire sales winner in this, her album debut." The publication further praised Foster's production, concluding that he has "developed a long-time top star". Cash Box put it in its category of "Pop Picks" and wrote, "The dozen tracks should give the listener loads of enjoyment no matter where he drops the needle." Record World believed the album had more of a country style, commenting that most of the songs have a "passing country feel" that allow for a "stylish c/w [country-western] album."

== Chart performance and singles ==
The Seely Style made its debut on the US Billboard Top Country Albums chart on October 15, 1966 and spent 20 weeks on the survey. By December 10, the album reached the number eight position on the country survey. It became Seely's only disc to make the top ten on the Billboard country chart and was her longest-running album on the chart. Two singles were included on the disc. "Don't Touch Me" was the lead single and was released in March 1966 by Monument Records. The song became her highest-peaking solo single on the US Billboard country songs chart, rising to number two. It also rose to the number 85 position on the Billboard Hot 100 and number 29 on the Billboard adult contemporary chart. Its second single, "It's Only Love", was released in September 1966. The song rose to number 15 on the US country songs chart in 1966.

== Track listing ==
Side one
No.	Title	Writer(s)	Length
1.	"Don't Touch Me"	Hank Cochran	3:09
2.	"I Fall to Pieces"	Hank Cochran; Harlan Howard	3:36
3.	"Yesterday"	John Lennon & Paul McCartney	2:16
4.	"I Wouldn't Know Where to Begin"	Bobby Bare; Charlie Williams	2:19
5.	"Put It Off Until Tomorrow"	Bill Owens; Dolly Parton	2:13
6.	"It Just Takes Practice"	Jeannie Seely; Gail Talley	2:06

Side two
No.	Title	Writer(s)	Length
1.	"It's Only Love"	Hank Cochran	3:38
2.	"You Don't Have Very Far to Go"	Merle Haggard; Red Simpson	2:09
3.	"Let It Be Me"	Gilbert Bécaud; Manny Curtis; Pierre Delanoë	2:59
4.	"Then Go Home to Her"	Hank Cochran; Jeannie Seely	2:53
5.	"Darling Are You Ever Coming Home"	Hank Cochran; Willie Nelson	2:20
6.	"You Don't Have Time for Me"	Hank Cochran	2:04

== Technical personnel ==
All credits are adapted from the liner notes of The Seely Style.

- Fred Foster – record producer
- Ed Hamilton – liner notes
- Ken Kim – photography

== Chart performance ==
Chart (1966)	Peak position
US Top Country Albums (Billboard)	8

== Release history ==
Region	Date	Format	Label	Ref.
North America	September 1966	Vinyl LP (Mono); Vinyl LP (Stereo)	Monument	
Australia	September 1966	Vinyl LP (Stereo)	Universal Record Club	
North America	circa 2020	Music download; streaming	Sony Music Entertainment	
