= When It's Over (Jeannie Seely song) =

Single by Jeannie Seely

from the album I'll Love You More
- B-side: "I'd Be Just as Lonely There"
- Released: March 1967
- Genre: Country
- Length: 2:34
- Label: Monument
- Songwriter: Hank Cochran
- Producer: Fred Foster

Jeannie Seely singles chronology
"A Wanderin' Man" (1966)	"When It's Over" (1967)	"These Memories" (1967)

"When It's Over" is a song written by Hank Cochran that was originally recorded by American country artist Jeannie Seely. Released as a single by Monument Records, it reached the top 40 of the US country songs chart in 1967. It was given a positive review from Cash Box magazine following its release and was included on her studio album I'll Love You More.

== Background and recording ==
Jeannie Seely's first major chart success was 1966's "Don't Touch Me", a ballad that rose into the US country top ten and later won her an accolade from the Grammy Awards. She had several follow-up single successes that made the country songs chart, among them was the song "When It's Over". The track was written by Hank Cochran, who also was responsible for writing "Don't Touch Me". "When It's Over" was produced by Fred Foster.

== Release, critical reception and chart performance ==
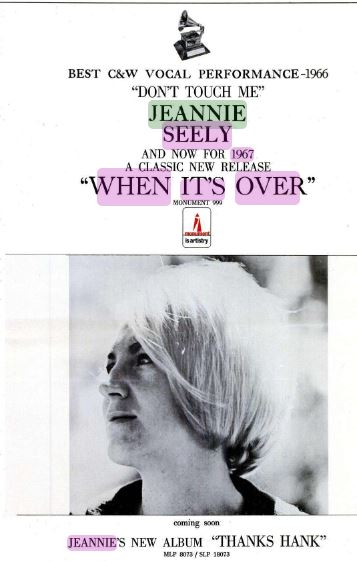
An advertisement in Billboard magazine for the release of "When It's Over", March 1967

"When It's Over" was released as a single by Monument Records in March 1967. It was distributed by Monument as a seven-inch vinyl record, containing a B-side titled "I'd Be Just as Lonely There". The song received a positive review from Cashbox magazine who commented, "The tear-stained. Hank Cochran-penned ditty gets a super-feelingful treatment by the songstress here." "When it's Over" made its debut on the US Billboard Hot Country Songs chart on March 18, 1967. It spent ten weeks there, rising to the number 39 position on May 6, 1967. It was the fourth top 40 song in her career and her first with the Monument label to miss the top 20. It was included on Seely's next studio album release I'll Love You More.

== Track listing ==
7" vinyl single

- "When It's Over" – 2:34
- "I'd Be Just as Lonely There" – 2:42

== Charts ==
=== Weekly charts ===
Weekly chart performance for "When It's Over"
Char (1967)	Peak position
US Hot Country Songs (Billboard)	39
