= Two for the Show (Jack Greene and Jeannie Seely album) =

Studio album by Jack Greene and Jeannie Seely
- Released: January 1973
- Recorded: c. October 1972
- Studio: Bradley's Barn
- Genre: Country
- Label: Decca

Jack Greene chronology
Greene Country (1971)	Two for the Show (1973)	Yours for the Taking (1980)

Jeannie Seely chronology
Please Be My New Love (1970)	Two for the Show (1973)	Can I Sleep in Your Arms/Lucky Ladies (1973)

Singles from Two for the Show
- 1. "Much Oblige" Released: November 1971; 2. "What in the World Has Gone Wrong with Our Love" Released: July 1972

Two for the Show is a studio album by American country music artists Jack Greene and Jeannie Seely. It was released in January 1973, by Decca Records. It was pair's second studio album as a duet team. The album included two singles that reached the US and Canadian country songs top 20 between 1971 and 1973: "Much Oblige" and "What in the World Has Gone Wrong with Our Love". The latter was co-written by Hank Cochran, who contributed to four additional tracks on the album. Two for the Show also made the US country albums top 40.

== Background, recording and content ==
Jack Greene and Jeannie Seely had individual music careers before pairing together as a duet team. Greene first broke through with the 1967 number one single "There Goes My Everything", while Seely first found success with the 1966 number two single "Don't Touch Me". The two then started singing duets while performing on Ernest Tubb's television show. This ultimately led to a successful recording and performing career together.

The duo's second album together was 1973's Two for the Show. The album was recorded in sessions held at Bradley's Barn around October 1972. According to Billboard, the duo recorded songs as a duet and individually at the studio. Two for the Show consisted of 11 tracks. Five of the album's tracks were penned by Hank Cochran: "We Know an Ending", "You're Heavy on My Mind Today", "What in the World Has Gone Wrong with Our Love", "We Found It in Each Other's Arms", and "Whiskey Dirt". Seely herself penned the song "It Just Doesn't Seem to Matter".

== Release, chart performance and singles ==
Two for the Show was released by Decca Records in January 1973 and was the duo's second studio album together. The label distributed it as a vinyl LP, with five songs on "side 1" and six songs on "side 2". It reached the number 36 position on the US Billboard Top Country Albums chart in early 1973, becoming the duo's second (and final) charting album together. A total of two singles were included on Two for the Show. The earliest single was "Much Oblige", which Decca first released in November 1971. It rose into the US and Canadian country songs top 20, peaking at number 15 on both charts. "What in the World Has Gone Wrong with Our Love" was released as a single in July 1972, rising to number 19 on both the US and Canadian country charts.

== Track listing ==
Side one
No.	Title	Writer(s)	Length
1.	"We Know an Ending"	Hank Cochran	2:44
2.	"You're Heavy on My Mind Today"	Hank Cochran	2:30
3.	"What in the World Has Gone Wrong with Our Love"	Hank Cochran; Johnny Slate	2:12
4.	"How Can Our Cheatin' Be Wrong"	Dallas Frazier	2:42
5.	"We Found It in Each Other's Arms"	Hank Cochran; Red Lane	2:40

Side two
No.	Title	Writer(s)	Length
1.	"It Just Doesn't Seem to Matter"	Jeannie Seely	2:28
2.	"The World Needs a Melody"	Larry Henley; Lane; Slate	2:48
3.	"Much Oblige"	Gene Simmons; G. Detaon; L. Fulford	2:10
4.	"You and Me Against the World"	Ted Harris	2:45
5.	"If It Ain't Love (Let's Leave It Alone)"	Dallas Frazier	2:35
6.	"Whiskey Dirt"	Cochran; Kirby	1:45

== Chart performance ==
Chart (1973)	Peak position
US Top Country Albums (Billboard)	36

== Release history ==
Region	Date	Format	Label	Ref.
United States	January 1973	Vinyl LP (Stereo)	Decca Records	
United Kingdom	January 1973	Vinyl LP (Stereo)	MCA Records	
