= It's All Over =

It's All Over may refer to:

- "It's All Over" (Johnny Cash song), 1976
- "It's All Over" (The Everly Brothers song), 1965
- "It's All Over" (David Houston and Tammy Wynette song), 1968
- "It's All Over" (Blue System & Dionne Warwick song), 1991
- It's All Over: The Kiss That Changed Spanish Football, 2024 documentary
- "It's All Over", a 2006 song by Three Days Grace from their album One-X
- "It's All Over", a 2019 song by Nebula from their album Holy Shit

== See also ==
- It's Over (disambiguation)
- "It's All Over Now", a 1960s song
