= Greatest Hits on Monument =

Greatest Hits on Monument may refer to:

- Greatest Hits on Monument (Connie Smith album), a 1993 album release by Connie Smith
- Greatest Hits on Monument (Jeannie Seely album), a 1993 album release by Jeannie Seely
