= Etta Britt =

Singer, songwriter

- Born: Melissa Prewitt; 1958 or 1959; Lancaster, Kentucky
- Genres: R&B, soul, blues
- Years active: 1978-present
- Labels: Wrinkled Records
- Website: ettabritt.com

Etta Britt (Melissa Prewitt, born Lancaster, Kentucky) is a Nashville-based R&B, soul and blues vocalist. Successful and sought after in the role of supporting artist, in 2012, Britt was approached by songwriter Sandy Knox (Reba McEntire) and music industry executive, Katie Gillon, to be the first artist to sign with Wrinkled Records as a featured artist.

== Early life ==
The Prewitt family (Arthor, Amanda and Melissa's seven siblings), moved from Lancaster, Kentucky to Louisville, Kentucky when Melissa was in the second grade, Melissa was raised in Louisville and attended Fern Creek High School. While away at sixth grade camp, Melissa won the talent competition, marking the point in her life when she knew she wanted to perform.

Pet-named Etta by her sister, who in return, is pet-named Myrna, the origin of these names is obscured or forgotten. Melissa started singing in the fourth grade, her sister, a cousin, and a friend sang in a gospel quartet and performed for local church-groups. As a young girl singing along with The Supremes, Melissa aspired to be more like Mary Wilson rather than Diana Ross because she loved singing harmonies.

== Career ==
Melissa (at the time credited as Melissa Dean), approached Dave Rowland (of Dave & Sugar) for an audition with the band and replaced the departing Vicki Hackeman in January 1979. During Melissa's tenure with Dave & Sugar (1979 to 1984), the band toured with headline acts that included: Kenny Rogers, Dottie West, Tammy Wynette, Gallagher and Conway Twitty. Melissa is credited on four Dave & Sugar albums including the Billboard Magazine Country Singles #1 hit, "Golden Tears". Additional trips to the Top 10, Country Singles chart, include: "My World Begins And Ends With You" #4, "Stay With Me" #6 and "Why Did You Have To Be So Good" #4. The group had continued success with eight additional Country Singles chart hits from 1980 through 1982.

In 1984, Melissa was residing in Nashville, Tennessee and married to studio guitarist Bob Britt, the couple soon had two daughters to support. No longer with the defunct Dave & Sugar trio, Melissa (Britt) took work waiting tables and cleaning houses while securing her real estate credentials, she also explored songwriting and singing as much as circumstances would permit. Bob Britt's reputation as a guitarist was growing, credited on Leon Russell's, Solid State (1984), he toured with The Dixie Chicks, John Fogerty and Wynonna Judd, ensuing credits include, Bob Dylan's, Grammy Award winning, Time Out of Mind (1997).

According to AllMusic, the early credit for the Etta Britt stage name is on Paul Metsa's, Whistling Past the Graveyard (1993). At some point, Melissa's sister had called the studio, asking to speak with Etta, Bob wrote the name "Etta Britt" on a track-sheet and the name combination later became Melissa's stage-name.

Never giving up on her singing career, Britt had developed a soulful blues style as a soloist, slightly outside of the Nashville, country music, genre. Etta's talent had been noted by Sandy Knox while working on Knox', Pushin' 40, Never Married, No Kids (2000); in 2012, the two had a chance encounter at a writers-night event. Knox, a songwriter with Grammy Award nominated works, heard Etta's compositions during her stage performance earlier that evening and invited her to lunch. Britt had prepared for the lunch, which also included music industry veteran Katie Gillon, with the expectation of discussing a deal on a song, not a recording contract.

I literally looked around and said "me?" It was shocking," Britt said. "I was 53 at the time, and that [a record deal] was the last thing I expected to come out of either of their mouths. It was exciting and surprising; a sense of new hope just came over me.

— Etta Britt, Falls Church News-Press, October 3, 2012.

Britt's record deal, signed at age 53, and a well received freshman album, Out of the Shadows (2012), hitting the Living Blues Magazine's chart at #20, attracted the attention of Marlo Thomas at the Huffington Post who writes: "This story is about a woman who sacrificed the spotlight to help her family survive, and has been given the chance to take center stage with her very own record deal more than 20 years later!" The NBC Today Show ran a feature story on August 25, 2012, covering highlights of the Huffington Post article, "Out Of The Shadows - Mom Signs Record Deal At 55", and includes video from an opening performance for Delbert McClinton at B.B. King's New York on July 27, 2012.

In 2013, Britt is a featured artist on B. J. Thomas', The Living Room Sessions, singing a duet with Thomas on an unplugged arrangement of "New Looks from an Old Lover". In Nov 2019, Britt played guitar with Bob Dylan's touring band.

== Solo albums ==
=== Out of the Shadows (2012 LP) ===
Out of the Shadows

- Released: 2012
- Format: "LP/CD"
- Label: Wrinkled Records (WR-1674)
- Producer: Bob Britt

No.	Title	Writer(s)	Length
1.	"Dog Wants In"	Don Von Tress, John Brannen	04:32
2.	"High"	Billy Maddox, Paul Thorn, Lari White	04:05
3.	"The Chokin' Kind"	Harlan Howard	04:04
4.	"Leap of Faith" (feat: Delbert McClinton)	Gary Nicholson, Glen Clark	04:14
5.	"In the Tears"	Michael McDonald, John Berry	05:31
6.	"I Believe"	Etta Britt, Bob Britt, Tony Kerr	03:28
7.	"Quiet House"	Etta Britt, Rebecca Lynn Howard, Rachel Thibodeaux	05:09
8.	"The Long Haul"	Michael McDonald, Bernie Chiaravalle, Chuck Alvarez	03:58
9.	"Make It Fast"	Jon Coleman, Andi Zack, Glenn Snow, Evie Nicole	04:21
10.	"Fallin'"	Etta Britt, Tony Kerr	03:41
11.	"The Bigger the Love (The Harder the Fall)"	Billy Burnette, Larry Henley, Larry Keith	03:56
12.	"She's Eighteen"	Etta Britt	03:55
Total length:			50:54

=== Reception ===
"Quiet House," the most interior of the two songs, does nothing less than survey the unsettling stillness within—within a house where children have left the nest to go into the world on their own, and within a parent's unsettled soul as she comes to grip with deafening silence and poignant memories, realizing "time just for me" is what she always dreamed of. But "this is nothing like I thought it'd be." Ms. Britt is fully inside the song, and barely, it seems, in control of her emotions as the piano laments softly and a cello rises hauntingly behind her until she bursts out with a piercing cry--"all aloooooo-ne…in a quiet house"—made all the more penetrating by a raspy edge in her voice, as if she were on the verge of tears.

— David McGee, The Bluegrass Special, May 2012.

== Discography ==
- Etta Britt is also published under the names, Melissa Dean and Melissa Britt.

Etta Britt discography
Year	Album	Primary artist	Capacity
1979	Stay with Me/Golden Tears	Dave Rowland & Sugar	Primary artist (Billboard Magazine Country Albums #20)
1980	New York Wine, Tennessee Shine	Dave Rowland & Sugar	Primary artist (Billboard Magazine Country Albums #47)
1981	Pleasure	Dave Rowland & Sugar	Primary artist (Billboard Magazine Country Albums #31)
1993	Whistling Past the Graveyard	Paul Metsa	Vocals, Vocals (Background)
1996	After Dark	Engelbert Humperdinck	Vocals (Background)
1996	Another Man's Sky	Royal Wade Kimes	Vocals (Background)
1996	Scattered	Big Kat Kaylor	Vocals (Background)
1997	Greatest Hits	Pam Tillis	Vocals (Background as M.Britt)
1997	Live: If That Ain't Country	David Allan Coe	Vocals (Background as M.Britt)
1998	Dorkfish	Bill Engvall	Vocals
1998	Anthology	Dave Rowland & Sugar	Vocals (credited as Melissa Dean)
1999	American Street	George McCorkle(Marshall Tucker Band)	Vocals (Background)
1999	Here's Your Christmas Album	Bill Engvall	Main Personnel, Vocals
2000	Blue Collar Comedy Tour Live	Blue Collar Comedy Tour	Vocals
2000	Pushin' 40, Never Married, No Kids	Sandy Knox	Laughs, Vocals (Background as M.Britt)
2001	King Kong Serenade	Allen Shadow	Vocals
2001	Rare + Well Done: The Greatest & Most Obscure Recordings	Al Kooper	Vocals see sample
2002	New Ground	Robert Bradley's Blackwater Surprise	Vocals (Background)
2002	Red White and Blue Forever	Mark Farner	Vocals (Background)
2003	Memarie	Memarie	Vocals (Background)
2004	Days of Our Lives	James Otto	Vocals (Background)U.S. Billboard Top Country Albums 61
2004	I Give My Heart	John Berry	Vocals (Background)
2004	Jambodians	Various artists	Vocals
2004	Ridin With the Legend	Keith Bryant	Main Personnel, Vocals (Background)
2005	A Fifth of Good Whiskey Blues: A Collection of Contemporary Blues Songs, Vol. 5	Etta Britt	Primary Artist (Track #7 "Mama's Got Her Gun")
2006	From the Heart	The Four Tops	Vocals (Background as M.Britt)
2006	Long Stone's Throw	Dan Mahar	Main Personnel, Vocals (Background)
2007	Between God And Country	Andy Hersey	Vocals (Background)
2007	Blame It on the Margaritas	Howard Livingston & Mile Marker 24	Vocals (Background)
2007	Everybody's Brother	Billy Joe Shaver	Main Personnel, Vocals (Background)
2007	Live It Slow	Keith Bryant	Main Personnel, Vocals (Background)
2008	2 Man Wrecking Crew	Cedric Burnside	Main Personnel, Vocals (Background)
2008	Best of B.J. Thomas [Curb]	B.J. Thomas	Vocals (Background)
2008	Cash Cabin Sessions	Vince Mira	Vocals (Background)
2008	Love And Money	Chuck Cannon	Vocals (Background)
2008	Shake Rag	Joel "Taz" DiGregorio	Main Personnel, Vocals (Background)
2009	Gale House Storybook	Spady	Vocals (Background)
2009	Vince Mira	Vince Mira	Vocals (Background)
2010	Bout Damn Time	Kentucky Thunder	Group Member
2010	Joy of the Journey	Jimmy Eugene	Vocals (Background)
2010	Sweet Home Alabama: The Country Music Tribute To Lynyrd Skynyrd	Various artists	Vocals (Background)
2012	What the Hell Is Goin' On?	Paul Thorn	Vocals (Background)
2012	Out of the Shadows	Etta Britt	Primary Artist
2013	Advice from a Father to a Son	Scott Ramminger	Vocals
2013	The Living Room Sessions	B.J. Thomas	Primary Artist
2013	The Way Life Goes	Tom Keifer	Vocals (Background)
2014	Etta Does Delbert	Etta Britt	Primary Artist

== Awards ==
Country Music Association
Year	Nominated work	Category	Result	Notes
1979	Dave & Sugar	Vocal Group of the Year	Nominated	Dave Rowland, Sue Powell, Etta Britt
