= Gloria Scott (singer) =

American singer

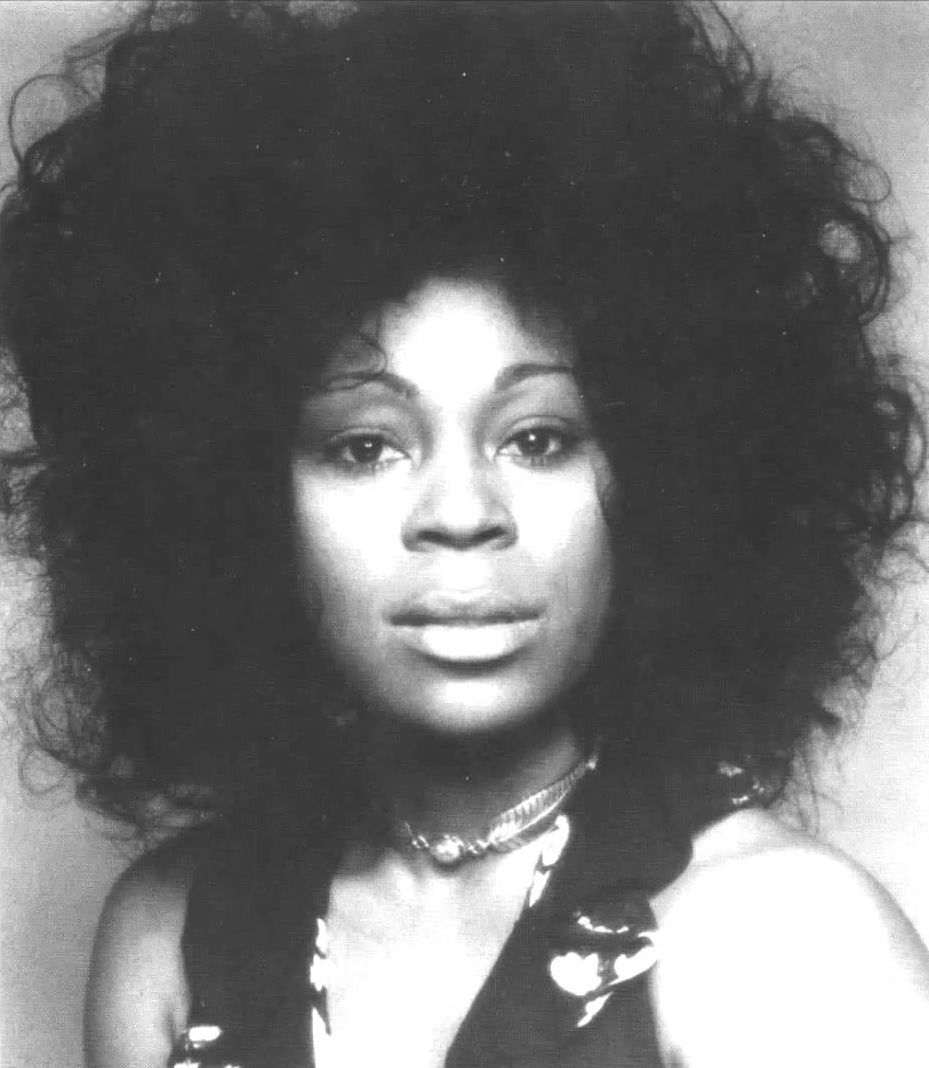

Background information
- Born: Gloria D. Scott; February 26, 1946 (age 80); Port Arthur, Texas, U.S.
- Genres: Soul, funk, R&B
- Instrument: Vocals
- Years active: 1964–present
- Labels: Casablanca, SedSoul

Gloria Scott (born February 26, 1946) is an American soul singer.

Her first recording, titled "I Taught Him" by Gloria Scott and the Tonettes, was written and produced by Sylvester Stewart (better known as Sly Stone), and released in 1964 when she was 17 years of age. She signed a seven-year contract with Barry White in 1972. White produced the 1974 album What Am I Gonna Do, and a single "Just as Long as We're Together (In My Life There Will Never Be Another)" which reached the top 20 on numerous record charts. She recorded a second album with arranger H. B. Barnum, but it was never released.

Scott was recruited as a member of the Ikettes with PP Arnold in 1965 and she also worked as a background singer for Mary Wilson (of The Supremes).

Scott is a regular performer at The Baltic Soul Weekender in Germany.

== Musical career ==
Her first 45 single was written and produced by Sylvester Stewart, better known as Sly Stone: "Gospel Singer Gloria Scott and the Tonettes cut I Taught Him with Sly in 1964. Reminiscent of girl groups like Martha and the Vandellas, The Shirelles and The Ronettes, Warner Brothers picked up this single for distribution." In an interview with Christian John Wikane of Popmatters, Scott says: "He [Sly] just kind of took me under his wing. I sang at the Cow Palace. Sly and his sister and his cousin LaTanya backed me up and they were called the Tonettes: Gloria Scott and the Tonettes."

She then became a member of The Ikettes. Tina Turner says in her autobiography: "After [previous Ikettes] Robbie, Jessie and Venetta walked out, Ike had quickly scooped up two inexperienced L.A. girls, Maxine Smith and Pat 'P.P.' Arnold, and a young club singer from Palo Alto named Gloria Scott.".

She later met and signed a seven-year contract with Barry White. White produced and arranged her first album, What Am I Gonna Do, which was released in 1974. Two tracks were released as singles. The album is notable for being the second released by Casablanca Records—label number NB0002 (NB0001 was by Kiss). At that time Warner Brothers distributed the album, in multiple countries.

Roshad Ollison, writing in the Virginia Pilot, says "What Am I Gonna Do is among Barry's most pop-minded productions. Gloria's lone release, it is also a gem. … What Am I Gonna Do, a classy effort on par with Barry's best albums, soon faded away; Gloria did, too."

Her single "Just as Long as We're Together (In My Life There Will Never Be Another)" was also produced by Barry White. This song peaked at No. 14 on the Hot Dance charts, No. 16 on Billboard (Feb 22, 1975) Hot Soul Singles and on the U.S. R&B. It was played on the famous TV show Soul Train.

Despite her seven-year contract with Barry White, and (indirectly) with Casablanca, her career failed to take off. PopMatters comments: "However, a combination of factors, including the growing pains of a new record company and White's focus on his own burgeoning career, ultimately limited the reach of What Am I Gonna Do. Though a follow-up single, 'Just As Long as We're Together', hit the R&B Top 20 and held the top spot on the Disco Singles chart in early-1975, the second album she recorded with arranger H. B. Barnum was not released. For all his solo success, Barry White was not delivering on his contract with Gloria Scott. He became one of the most seminal figures of the 1970s while Scott faded into obscurity."

She is credited as a backup singer on the 1979 self-titled album by Mary Wilson (of the Supremes), and in the late 1970s and early 1980s, also toured with Wilson and fellow background singer, Karen Jackson.

Scott has performed every year since 2008 at The Baltic Soul Weekender in Germany. Her performance of "Help Me Get Off This Merry-Go-Round", with the Baltic Soul Orchestra, was released as a single.

On September 30, 2022, Scott released her second album on Acid Jazz, titled So Wonderful.

== Personal life ==
Scott was born in Port Arthur, Texas, to part-time church singer, mother Ella. She was raised in the city of Houston, before moving with her family to northern California when she was 14 years of age. Her parents, both cooks opened Ella's Cafe in Palo Alto to help support Scott's nine siblings. Subsequent to her recording and musical career in San Francisco and Los Angeles, Scott relocated to Guam where she spent eight years.

Scott currently resides in Lake County, California.

== Discography ==
=== Albums ===
- What Am I Gonna Do (Casablanca, 1974)
- So Wonderful (Acid Jazz, 2022)

=== Singles ===
Year	Title	Chart Positions	
Year	Title	U.S. Hot Dance	U.S. R&B
1974	"Just as Long as We're Together (In My Life There Will Never Be Another)"	14	14
1974	"What Am I Gonna Do"	—	74

- "What Am I Gonna Do" – (7", Single) Casablanca Records 1974
- "What Shall I Do" – (7", Single) Casablanca Records 1974
- "Just As Long As We're Together (In My Life There Will Never Be Another)" – (7", Single) Casablanca Records 1974
- "(A Case Of) Too Much Love Makin'" – Casablanca Records 1975
- "You're Losing Me" – Ann Sexton & Baltic Soul Orchestra/ Gloria Scott & Baltic Soul Orchestra – Unique 2009
- "Help Me Get Off This Merry-Go-Round" – Ann Sexton & Baltic Soul Orchestra/ Gloria Scott & Baltic Soul Orchestra – Unique 2009
- "That's The Way Love Is" – Sedsoul – 2010
- "Can't Keep Running Away" – Single – (2013)
- "It's So Wonderful" – Single – (2013)
- "Never Gonna Let You Go" – Single – (2013)
- "Promised Land" – Single – (2022)
- "All of the Time, You're on my Mind" – Single – (2022)
- "So Wonderful" – Single – (2022)

=== Backing vocal credits ===
- 1972: Bo Diddley – Where It All Began
- 1979: Mary Wilson – Mary Wilson

== Cultural references ==
John Connolly in Nocturnes writes: "Jerry passed through the main gates to the Benson farm, instinctively turning down the truck radio, since Bruce didn't appreciate music much, and certainly not the stuff that was pouring out of Jerry's speakers just now: Gloria Scott's sultry vocals, backed up by the late, great Barry White's production skills."
