= Levanna McLean =

British dj and dancer

Abigail McLean (born between 1996 and 1998) known professionally as Levanna McLean and 'Northern soul girl', is a British disc jockey and dancer.

== Life and career ==
McLean became a YouTube star after uploading numerous videos of her dancing to Northern soul music. The videos were filmed by her mother, Eve Arslett, and both were stunned by the popularity of the videos, some garnering nearly a quarter of a million views. In 2013, she danced to Pharrell Williams' song "Happy" in one of those music videos and in 2014 she co-starred with him at the BRIT Awards, broadcast live from the O2 Arena in London. Williams had previously sourced dancers for the performance and personally contacted McLean on Twitter. She has since been involved in promoting the British Northern soul scene. In 2015, McLean compiled the track selection for the compilation Express Your Soul. She is featured on the cover and inside of the 2015 compilation Move On Up – The Very Best of Northern Soul. For the second edition Move On Up Volume Two – The Very Best of Northern Soul, released in 2016, she contributed a text for the CD case and can be seen again on the cover and inside.

Levanna McLean is based in Bristol but has been a disc jockey at concerts throughout Europe, among others at the music festival Baltic Soul Weekender.

== Discography ==
=== Compilations ===
- Express Your Soul (2015)
- Move On Up Volume Two – The Very Best of Northern Soul (2016)
- Levanna and the Streets of Soul – Wonderful Night (2024)
