= It's Over =

It's Over may refer to:

== Songs ==
- "It's Over" (Electric Light Orchestra song), 1978
- "It's Over" (Jesse McCartney song), 2008
- "It's Over" (Jimmie Rodgers song), 1966
- "It's Over" (Level 42 song), 1987
- "It's Over" (Roy Orbison song), 1964
- "It's Over" (Squeeze song), 1994
- "It's Over", by Audio Adrenaline from Underdog
- "It's Over", by Bachman–Turner Overdrive from Head On
- "It's Over", by Badfinger from Straight Up
- "It's Over", by Bic Runga from Birds
- "It's Over", by Boz Scaggs from Silk Degrees
- "It's Over", by The Cheetah Girls from The Cheetah Girls 2 soundtrack
- "It's Over", by the Fire Theft from their self-titled album
- "It's Over", by Freeway from Free at Last
- "It's Over", by Ghostface Killah from The Pretty Toney Album
- "It's Over", by John Legend from Evolver
- "It's Over", by John Mayall & The Bluesbreakers from A Hard Road
- "It's Over", by Kurupt from Space Boogie: Smoke Oddessey
- "It's Over", by Montell Jordan from This Is How We Do It
- "It's Over", by Prism from the self-titled album
- "It's Over", by Sondre Lerche from Two Way Monologue
- "It's Over", by Trapt from DNA
- "It's Over", by White Lion from Mane Attraction
- "It's Over", by Yes from 90125
- "It's Over", by Steve Peregrin Took, recorded 1977 by Steve Took's Horns

== See also ==
- "Don't Dream It's Over", song by Crowded House, covered by Paul Young and Sixpence None the Richer
- "Fool (If You Think It's Over)", song by Chris Rea, covered by Elkie Brooks
- When It's Over (disambiguation)
