= Lucky Ladies (song) =

Single by Jeannie Seely

from the album Can I Sleep in Your Arms/Lucky Ladies
- Released: December 1973
- Genre: Country
- Length: 2:59
- Label: MCA
- Songwriter(s): Hank Cochran
- Producer(s): Walter Haynes

Jeannie Seely singles chronology
"Can I Sleep in Your Arms" (1973)	"Lucky Ladies" (1973)	"I Miss You" (1974)

"Lucky Ladies" is a song written by Hank Cochran that was originally recorded by American country artist Jeannie Seely. Released as a single by MCA Records, it placed in the top 20 on both the US and Canadian country charts in 1974. The song was adapted from the song "Come All You Fair and Tender Ladies" and received reviews from music magazines following its release. It was the second single spawned from Seely's studio album Can I Sleep in Your Arms/Lucky Ladies.

== Background, composition and recording ==
Jeannie Seely was among a series of female artists that rose to country music success during the 1960s. Beginning with the Grammy Award-winning song "Don't Touch Me", she had top 20 (and occasionally top ten) songs through the mid 1970s. Many of these recordings were written by songwriter Hank Cochran, whom she was also married to at this point. Cochran adapted melody from the folk tune "Come All You Fair and Tender Ladies" into a song with new lyrics titled "Lucky Ladies". Cochran was credited for writing both the words and music on the track. "Lucky Ladies" was produced by Walter Haynes.

== Release, critical reception and chart performance ==
"Lucky Ladies" was released as a single in December 1973 by MCA Records. It was the second single spawned from Seely's studio album Can I Sleep in Your Arms/Lucky Ladies. It was distributed as a seven-inch vinyl single and featured the B-side, "Hold Me". "Lucky Ladies" was reviewed by music publications following its release. Billboard magazine named it among its "Top Single Picks" in December 1973, writing that another Cochran-composed song proves that "she's on a hot streak". Cash Box commented, "A tender and moving ballad the song aptly captures a dreamy mood with great background harmony and laid-back instrumentation." "Lucky Ladies" made its debut on the US Billboard Hot Country Songs chart on December 15, 1973. It spent 13 weeks there through early 1974, rising to the number 11 position on February 9. It became Seely's final top 20 single on the Billboard country chart. It also placed in the top 20 of RPM Country Tracks chart in Canada, rising to number 17 around the same time. It became Seely's second-to-last top 20 song on the RPM chart.

== Track listings ==
7" vinyl single

- "Lucky Ladies" – 2:59
- "Hold Me" – 2:06

== Charts ==
=== Weekly charts ===
Weekly chart performance for "Lucky Ladies"
Chart (1973–1974)	Peak position
Canada Country Tracks (RPM)	17
US Hot Country Songs (Billboard)	11
