= Southtown U.S.A. =

Single by The Dixiebelles with Cornbread and Jerry

from the album Down At Papa Joe's
- B-side: "Why Don't You Set Me Free"
- Released: 1963
- Length: 2:10
- Label: Sound Stage 7
- Songwriter: Billy Sherrill

The Dixiebelles with Cornbread and Jerry singles chronology
"(Down at) Papa Joe's" (1963)	"Southtown U.S.A." (1963)	"New York Town" (1964)

"Southtown U.S.A." is a song released by The Dixiebelles in late 1963. The song spent eight weeks on the Billboard Hot 100 chart, reaching No. 15, while reaching No. 20 on the Cash Box Top 100, and No. 18 on Canada's CHUM Hit Parade.

== Chart performance ==
Chart (1964)	Peak position
US Billboard Hot 100	15
US Cash Box Top 100	20
Canada - CHUM Hit Parade	18

== Cover versions ==
- In 1964, Lawrence Welk and His Orchestra released a version of the song on the album Early Hits of 1964. The song was released as a single in 1970, and reached No. 37 on Billboard's Easy Listening chart.
