= Can I Sleep in Your Arms/Lucky Ladies =

Studio album by Jeannie Seely
- Released: November 1973
- Genre: Country
- Label: MCA
- Producer: Walter Haynes

Jeannie Seely chronology
Two for the Show (1973)	Can I Sleep in Your Arms/Lucky Ladies (1973)	Live at the Grand Ole Opry (1978)

Singles from Can I Sleep in Your Arms/Lucky Ladies
- 1. "Tell Me Again" Released: October 1970; 2. "Alright I'll Sign the Papers" Released: October 1971; 3. "Pride" Released: May 1972; 4. "Farm in Pennsyltucky" Released: December 1972; 5. "Can I Sleep in Your Arms" Released: June 1973; 6. "Lucky Ladies" Released: December 1973

Can I Sleep in Your Arms/Lucky Ladies is the seventh solo studio album by American country artist Jeannie Seely. It was released by MCA Records in November 1973. It consisted of 11 tracks, four of which were written by songwriter Hank Cochran. Among the tracks were six songs originally released as singles: "Tell Me Again", "Alright I'll Sign the Papers", "Pride", "Farm in Pennsyltucky", "Can I Sleep in Your Arms" and "Lucky Ladies". Its highest-charting singles were the latter two releases, reaching the US country top ten and top 20 respectively. The album itself made the top 20 of the US country chart during the same period. The project received reviews from music publications following its original release.

== Background, recording and content ==
Along with Loretta Lynn and Tammy Wynette, Jeannie Seely was one of several 1960s female artists to find commercial success in country music. Her 1966 song "Don't Touch Me" reached number two on the country charts and later won her a Grammy award. She would have several more top ten and top 20 songs through the mid 1970s. Among these songs were the 1973 singles "Can I Sleep in Your Arms" and "Lucky Ladies". They would inspire the name of Seely's next studio album. The project was produced by Walter Haynes and consisted of 11 tracks. Four of the tracks were written by songwriter Hank Cochran: "Can I Sleep in Your Arms", "Lucky Ladies", "Hold Me" and "He'll Love the One He's With". It also featured Seely's self-composed song "Farm in Pennsyltucky", along with Mel Tillis's "Alright I'll Sign the Papers" and Larry Gatlin's "Hangin' On Alone".

== Release, critical reception and chart performance ==
Can I Sleep in Your Arms/Lucky Ladies was released by MCA Records in November 1973. It was the ninth studio project of Seely's career. The label issued it as a vinyl LP, which also included a club edition. It was also offered as an 8-track cartridge. The album received reviews from music magazines following its original release. Billboard named it among its "Top Album Picks", finding that the production by Walter Haynes showed improvement from previous LP's and allowed Seely to take more ownership in her vocals. They believed the album had "plenty of singles potential", highlighting three tracks as standing apart from the rest of the songs on the album: "Hold Me", "He Knows What I'm Crying About" and "He'll Love the One He's With".

Cashbox called it "a great new LP", highlighting specific tracks in their review. The publication described "Hold Me" as "delightful" and found that "Lucky Ladies" "captures a dreamy and mellow mood". Additionally, the website AllMusic gave the album three out of five stars, but did not provide a written review. Can I Sleep in Your Arms/Lucky Ladies rose to number 15 on the US Billboard Top Country Albums chart in early 1974. It was Seely's first solo studio album to make the chart since 1968 and her final to chart there as well.

== Singles ==
A total of six singles were included on the track listing of Can I Sleep in Your Arms/Lucky Ladies. Its earliest single was "Tell Me Again", which was first released by Decca Records in October 1970 and peaked at number 58 on the US Hot Country Songs chart. It was followed in October 1971 by the release of "Alright I'll Sign the Papers", which Decca also issued. It reached the number 42 position on the US country songs chart. "Pride" was issued as the third single in May 1972, rising to the number 47 position on the US country chart. "Farm in Pennsyltucky" followed in December 1972 and was the album's lowest-charting release, peaking at number 72 on the Hot Country Songs chart. "Can I Sleep in Your Arms" was the fifth single released and was distributed by MCA Records in June 1973. It was the album's highest-climbing single and only top-ten entry, peaking at number six on the US Hot Country Songs chart. The sixth and final single was "Lucky Ladies" in December 1973, which rose into the US country top 20, peaking at number 11. In addition the latter two singles made entries on Canada's RPM Country Tracks chart.

== Track listing ==
Side one
No.	Title	Writer(s)	Length
1.	"Can I Sleep in Your Arms"	Hank Cochran	3:35
2.	"Hold Me"	Hank Cochran	2:06
3.	"He Knows What I'm Crying About"	John Riggs	2:19
4.	"Tell Me Again"	Jerry Crutchfield	2:30
5.	"Pride"	Irene Stanton; Wayne Walker	2:35
6.	"I'd Do as Much for You"	Cliff Cochran; Barbara Cochran	2:50

Side two
No.	Title	Writer(s)	Length
1.	"Lucky Ladies"	Hank Cochran	2:59
2.	"Alright, I'll Sign the Papers"	Mel Tillis	2:27
3.	"Farm in Pennsyltucky"	Jeannie Seely	1:50
4.	"He'll Love the One He's With"	Hank Cochran; Glenn Martin	2:50
5.	"Hangin' on Alone"	Larry Gatlin	2:34

== Personnel ==
All credits are adapted from the liner notes of Can I Sleep in Your Arms/Lucky Ladies.

- Marshall Farwell – Photography
- Walter Haynes – Producer
- Jeannie Seely – Cover design

== Chart performance ==
Chart (1973–1974)	Peak position
US Top Country Albums (Billboard)	15

== Release history ==
Region	Date	Format	Label	Ref.
North America	November 1973	Vinyl LP; Vinyl LP (Club Edition); 8-Track	MCA Records	
