= Sound Stage 7 =

US record label

Sound Stage 7 was an American, Nashville, Tennessee based record label of the 1960s and 1970s, noted mainly for its soul music releases. The label's biggest star was Joe Simon, who placed numerous singles on the US R&B and pop charts during his 1965–1970 tenure.

== History ==
=== Early era (1963–65) ===
The label was founded in 1963 by Fred Foster, who had already achieved a measure of success as the founder of Monument Records. Monument was known primarily as a country and pop label. Sound Stage 7 was founded specifically to house artists who were more oriented towards R&B, although in its very early years the label was also home to several pop acts.

Despite releasing singles by dozens of artists, for the first two years that the company was in operation, the only Sound Stage 7 musicians to reach the U.S. Top 40 were The Dixie Belles, who had a #9 U.S. pop hit in 1963 with "(Down At) Papa Joe's", and also scored a #15 pop hit with follow-up single "Southtown U.S.A." The Dixie Belles were produced by Bill Justis. The group broke up after their third single failed to hit the Billboard Hot 100. Their only other artist to chart during this period were The Monarchs, who had a minor hit with "Look Homeward Angel" (#47) in early 1964.

=== The John Richbourg era (1965–70) ===
In mid-1965, Foster struck a deal with John Richbourg who became the label's head of A&R. From this point on, Sound Stage 7 was strictly a soul and R&B label, and almost all of the label's output was produced by Richbourg under the aegis of his JR Enterprises company. Also working for JR Enterprises was the songwriter, co-producer and occasional recording artist, Allen Orange, who was Richbourg's right-hand man until the late 1960s.

Richbourg's biggest commercial success was bringing Joe Simon to the label in 1966. Simon had already scored two hits on Vee-Jay Records in 1964 and 1965, but was left without a recording contract when that label folded. Richbourg produced fifteen singles for Simon on the label between 1966 and 1970. All of them would make the U.S. pop and/or R&B charts. Simon's biggest success on the label was his 1969 hit "The Chokin' Kind", which hit #1 on the R&B charts, and #13 pop, and sold over a million copies.

The only other charting artists on the label between 1965 and 1970 were Ella Washington and Roscoe Shelton, both of whom had one charting R&B single apiece. Washington and Shelton were also the only artists (other than Simon) to release an album on Sound Stage 7 between 1965 and 1970. Although Sound Stage 7 released over a hundred singles during this era, the label only released eight albums, six of which were by Simon.

Other notable artists on the label during this era, who had chart success either before, or after, their stay at Sound Stage 7 included Roscoe Robinson, Arthur Alexander, Ivory Joe Hunter, Roscoe Shelton, Sir Latimore Brown, and Sam Baker.

Richbourg's production deal with Sound Stage 7 ended in 1970, and Simon left the label the same year. Orange, who had contributed to the label as a songwriter and co-producer also left the company in the late 1960s to form his own label, House of Orange Records.

=== Richbourg's return, and label dissolution (1971-1977) ===
Sound Stage 7 was dormant until late 1971, when Richbourg resumed producing material for the label, albeit at a reduced rate. From 1971 through 1976, Sound Stage 7 only issued twenty one singles. Post-1970, Richbourg devoted much of his production activity to artists at his own labels (Seventy Seven and Sound Plus), as well as producing material for Joe Simon at Simon's new label, Spring.

Joining JR Enterprises as Richbourg's right-hand man was Jackey Beavers. Beavers performed much the same function as Orange had in the 1960s, being a frequent songwriter and co-producer of Sound Stage 7 recordings, as well an occasional recording artist in his own right.

Notable artists on the label's roster during the 1970s included Betty Everett and Ann Sexton. However, the label's only charting artist from 1971 to 1976 was once again Joe Simon – even though Simon had left the label in 1970. Nevertheless, Simon hit with the single "Misty Blue" in 1972; the previously unreleased track had been recorded several years earlier, while Simon was still under contract to Sound Stage 7.

In 1977, Ann Sexton charted on the R&B chart with "I'm His Wife (You're Just A Friend)". This would be the label's final hit. Sound Stage 7's final release was the Betty Everett single "Prophecy", released in late 1977.

=== Reissued material (1978–present) ===
As part of the deal he made with Foster, Richbourg retained the rights to all the recordings he produced for the label. Various compilation albums have been issued over the years of Sound Stage 7 material, almost all of it drawing on the recordings controlled by JR Enterprises. Much of the Foster-controlled material has yet to see reissue.

== See also ==
- List of record labels
