= Ann Sexton =

American soul singer (1947–2025)

- Also known as: Mary Burton
- Born: Mary Ann Sexton; February 6, 1947; Greenville, South Carolina, U.S.
- Died: March 13, 2025 (aged 78)
- Genres: Soul, funk
- Occupation: Singer
- Years active: Late 1960s – late 1970s From 2007
- Labels: Impel, Seventy 7, Sound Stage 7

Ann Sexton (born Mary Ann Sexton; February 6, 1947 – March 13, 2025) was an American soul singer who recorded mainly in the 1970s. Her biggest hit, "You're Gonna Miss Me", reached the R&B chart in 1973.

== Life and career ==
Sexton was born in Greenville, South Carolina on February 6, 1947, and was the cousin of singer and songwriter Chuck Jackson. Influenced by gospel music, she sang in her church choir and won local talent shows before singing back-up on a recording by Elijah and the Ebonies. She married the group's saxophonist, Melvin Burton, and the pair formed their own band, Ann Sexton and the Masters of Soul, in the late 1960s.

She was seen performing with the group by songwriter David Lee, the owner of the small local Impel record label, who recorded and released her first solo single, "You're Letting Me Down", in 1971. She then signed to John Richbourg's Seventy 7 Records, part of the Sound Stage 7 group, for whom she recorded a series of singles in Nashville and Memphis, Tennessee. In 1973, "You're Gonna Miss Me" reached No. 47 on the Billboard R&B chart, and she released the album Loving You, Loving Me. Many of her recordings were co-written by herself and her husband, and several later became popular on the Northern soul scene in the UK. She recorded ballads as well as dance tracks, and the Sound Stage 7 label released her album The Beginning in 1977. It featured the single "I'm His Wife (You're Just a Friend)" which reached No. 79 on the R&B chart.

Sexton later worked at a New York City school as a paraprofessional, using her married name Mary Burton. After her 1973 recording of "You're Losing Me" was featured in the 2003 film, 21 Grams, Sonny Hudson, who worked in the same school, answered some internet inquiries about her. Hudson, acting on her behalf and that of the German DJ and promoter Dan Dombrowe, began negotiations and after a lengthy period, Sexton agreed to go on stage again after a 30-year absence. In March 2007, she made her first performance since the 1970s at the Baltic Soul Weekender in Germany. She performed again at the Baltic Soul Weekender in April 2008, and continued to make occasional appearances at festivals in the U.S. and Europe.

Sexton died on March 13, 2025, at the age of 78.

== Discography ==
- Loving You, Loving Me (Seventy 7 Records, 1973)
- The Beginning (Sound Stage 7, 1977)
- You're Gonna Miss Me (Charly, 1995)
- Anthology (Soul Brother Records, 2004)
