= A Wanderin' Man =

Single by Jeannie Seely

from the album Thanks, Hank!
- B-side: "Darling, Are You Ever Coming Home"
- Released: December 1966
- Genre: Country
- Length: 2:19
- Label: Monument
- Songwriter(s): Hank Cochran
- Producer(s): Fred Foster

Jeannie Seely singles chronology
"It's Only Love" (1966)	"A Wanderin' Man" (1966)	"When It's Over" (1967)

"A Wanderin' Man" is a song written by Hank Cochran that was originally recorded by American country artist Jeannie Seely. Released as a single by Monument Records, it reached the top 20 of the US country songs chart in 1967. It was Seely's third top 20 single in her career and was given positive reviews from music magazines following its release. It appeared on her second studio album called Thanks, Hank!.

== Background and recording ==
Jeannie Seely broke through into country music stardom with the 1966 Hank Cochran-penned ballad "Don't Touch Me". The song received a Grammy award and became a top ten US country single. Her follow-up single releases would become top 20 country songs: "It's Only Love" and "A Wanderin' Man". Cochran also composed "A Wanderin' Man" and the track was produced by Fred Foster.

== Release, critical reception and chart performance ==
"A Wanderin' Man" was released as a single by Monument Records in December 1966. The label issued it as a seven-inch vinyl record and included a B-side: "Darling, Are You Ever Coming Home". The song received a positive response from music magazines. Billboard praised Seely's vocal, commenting that she "sings to perfection". Cash Box called it a "plaintive offering" and believed it would do "nice business" on the record charts. "A Wanderin' Man" made its debut on the US Billboard Hot Country Songs chart on December 17, 1966. It spent 13 weeks on the chart, reaching the number 13 position on February 4, 1967. It became Seely's third top 20 single in her career and her third to make any Billboard chart. The song was then featured on Seely's second studio album titled Thanks, Hank!.

== Track listing ==
7" vinyl single

- "A Wanderin' Man" – 2:20
- "Darling, Are You Ever Coming Home" – 2:20

== Charts ==
=== Weekly charts ===
Weekly chart performance for "A Wanderin' Man"
Char (1966–1967)	Peak position
US Hot Country Songs (Billboard)	13
