= Jim Mundy =

American singer-songwriter (1934–2025)

- Born: James White; February 8, 1934; Muldrow, Oklahoma, U.S.
- Died: October 31, 2025 (aged 91) Fort Smith, Arkansas, U.S.
- Genres: Country
- Occupation: Singer-songwriter
- Years active: 1973–1979
- Labels: Hickory; ABC; Hill Country; MCM

James Lemuel White (February 8, 1934 – October 31, 2025), known professionally as Jim Mundy, was an American country music singer. Between 1973 and 1976, he recorded for ABC Records and charted within the Top 40 of the Hot Country Songs charts.

Mundy also recorded commercial jingles for Pillsbury, Union 76, Coca-Cola and Miller Brewing Company.

Two of his songs, "The River's Too Wide" and "Come Home", received awards from the American Society of Composers, Authors and Publishers in 1974.

Mundy's sister, Ann J. Morton, and brother, Bill White, were also country music singers.

Mundy died on October 31, 2025, at the age of 91.

== Singles ==
Year	Single	Chart Positions	
Year	Single	US Country	CAN Country
1973	"The River's Too Wide"	13	9
1974	"Come Home"	49	—
1974	"She's No Ordinary Woman (Ordinarily)"	71	—
1975	"She's Already Gone"	37	24
1975	"Blue Eyes and Waltzes"	81	—
1976	"I'm Knee Deep in Loving You"	86	—
1976	"I Never Met a Girl I Didn't Like"	94	—
1977	"Summertime Blues"	70	—
1978	"If You Think I Love You Now" (with Terri Melton)	76	—
1979	"Kiss You All Over" (with Terri Melton)	87	—
