= I'm Knee Deep in Loving You =

Single by Dave & Sugar

from the album That's the Way Love Should Be
- B-side: "Livin' at the End of the Rainbow"
- Released: October 29, 1977
- Recorded: April 1977
- Studio: Sound Masters Studios, Nashville, Tennessee
- Genre: Country
- Length: 2:37
- Label: RCA
- Songwriter(s): Sonny Throckmorton
- Producer(s): Jerry Bradley, Dave Rowland

Dave & Sugar singles chronology
"That's the Way Love Should Be" (1978)	"I'm Knee Deep in Loving You" (1977)	"Gotta Quit Lookin' at You Baby" (1979)

"I'm Knee Deep in Loving You" is a song written by Sonny Throckmorton. It was first recorded by Jim Mundy, whose version reached No. 86 on the Hot Country Songs charts in 1976.

It was later recorded by American country music group Dave & Sugar. It was released in October 1977 as the second single from the album That's the Way Love Should Be. Their version of the song reached number 2 on the Billboard Hot Country Singles & Tracks chart.

== Chart performance ==
Chart (1977)	Peak position
US Hot Country Songs (Billboard)	2
Canadian RPM Country Tracks	4
