= Baltic Soul Weekender =

Annual music festival

- Genre: Soul, Funk, Soulful House, Disco
- Locations: 2007–2013: Holidayparc Weissenhäuser Strand; 2014–2016: Center Parc Bispinger Heide; since 2018: Holidayparc Weissenhäuser Strand
- Years active: 2007–present
- Founders: Daniel Dombrowe
- Attendance: 2007: 1,200; 2008: 2,400; 2009: 3,500; 2010: 4,500 (sold out); 2011: 4,500 (sold out); 2012: 4,500 (sold out); 2013: 4,500 (sold out); 2014 (May): 4,700 (sold out); 2014 (November): 2,000; 2016: 2,800; 2017: 2,500; 2018: 4,000; 2019: 4,200; 2020: Canceled due to the COVID-19 pandemic; 2021 (April): Rescheduled due to COVID-19; 2021 (November): Canceled due to COVID-19; 2022: 2,400; 2023: 3,500; 2024: 3,900
- Website: www.baltic-soul.de

The Baltic Soul Weekender is an annual music festival with a maximum attendance of 4,700 visitors held for the first time in 2007. The Baltic Soul Weekender offers a musical journey through the past decades of music: soul, funk, soulful house and disco. In addition to live acts, the visitor can listen to well-known DJs. It is Germany's only weekender that includes accommodation at the festival location. The festival was founded by the disc jockey and event manager Daniel Dombrowe (Dan D.).

== Location ==
From 2007 to 2013 the location was 120 km north of Hamburg, Germany, at the Holidayparc Weissenhäuser Strand at the Baltic Sea. From 2014 to 2016 the event took place at the Center Parc Bispinger Heide. In November 2014, a one-time DJ weekender was held. After the previously organizing Soul Weekender GmbH filed for bankruptcy in 2015, the agency Four Artists from Berlin has organized the Baltic Soul Weekender since 2016. Dan Dombrowe remained as creative director. Since 2018 the event takes place again at the Holidayparc Weissenhäuser Strand. In 2020, Four Artists ceased operations independently of the Baltic Soul Weekender. KJ Projects GmbH has been the organizer of the event from 2022 to 2025.

== Historical overview and line-up ==
Various artists and live acts have performed on stage at the Baltic Soul Weekender in the past. Meanwhile and after the end of the stage program, there was music from various disc jockeys on smaller so-called floors (dance areas). All day various DJs were playing music on the Baltic Soul TV, which is available in all rooms.

	Live acts	DJs	Baltic Soul TV
BSW #1; March 23 to 25, 2007	Ann Sexton, Roy Ayers, Marva Whitney, Joy Denalane, Erobique, Omar, James Kakande, Carl Keaton Jr., Haruhiko Ikeda	Boris Dlugosch, Brother M., The Buttbrothers, Constantin Groll, Cuebism, Derrick White, The Disco Boys, Crout, DJ Friction, Eddie Piller, Guido Weber, Hans Nieswandt, Heiko Jahnke, Henry Storch, Jay Lee, Jay Scarlett, John Buckby, Jörg Recordshack, Knee Deep, Larris, Marcel Vogel, Matt Moroder, Michael Fuchs, Mousse T., Nico Palermo, Nils Bouldhouse, Oliver Korthals, Pari, Ralph Tee, Rob Wigley, Sinan, Smudo, Soulciety, Stefano Oggiano, Steve Hobbs, Supergid, The Thoennessen, Turntablerocker, Tybreak, Vincenzo, Wallace	Kenny B.
BSW #2; April 25 to 27, 2008	The Temptations, Fatback Band, Alexander O’Neal, Ann Sexton, Carl Douglas, Gloria Scott, Jeff Hendrick, Pat Appleton, Tuomo, Astrid North, Brown Hill, Sharon Phillips, Lee Armstrong Express feat. Ghee, 2529	Crout, Dan D., Chris Anderton, The Disco Boys, DJ Friction, Eddie Piller, Hans Nieswandt, Henry Storch, Jan Delay, Jazzanova, Jörg Recordshack, Lloyd Atrill, Michael Reinboth, Michael Rütten, Mick Farrer, Mike Thompson, Mr. Groove, Miss Kelly Marie, Oghuzan Celik, Ralf Gum, Rob Wigley, Sinan Mercenk, Smudo, Steve Hobbs, The Stylistics DJ Team, Supergid, The Buttbrothers, Tom Kaiser	Bernd Niedergesäß, Kenny B.
BSW #3; April 24 to 26, 2009	Melba Moore, Incognito, George McCrae, Kurtis Blow, Joyce Sims, Garland Green, Ann Sexton, Gloria Scott, Brown Hill, Sharon Phillips, Daniel Dodd Ellis, Oceana	Ady Croasdell, Crout, Dan D., DJ Friction, DJ Mad, Eddie Piller, Gabriel Bouffiere, Hans Nieswandt, Henry Storch, Karsten John, Lloyd Attrill, Michael Reinboth, Mick Farrer, Mike Thompson, Miss Kelly Marie, Mo’ Horizons, Mr. Brown, Ralf Gum, Rob Wigley, Smudo, Steve Hobbs, Supergid, Tom Kaiser.	Bernd Niedergesäß, Kenny B.
BSW #4; April 23 to 25, 2010	Soul II Soul, The Real Thing, Fettes Brot, Keni Burke, Collins & Collins, Ann Sexton, Gloria Scott, Cool Million, Bennson, Kaye-Ree, Sharon Phillips, Daniel Dodd Ellis, Keni Burke Note: Instead of Soul II Soul, De La Soul were supposed to perform but were prevented for prior commitments.	Crout, Dan D., DJ E.A.S.E., DJ Friction, DJ Mad, DJ Tomekk, Eddie Piller, Ferry Ultra, Gabriel Bouffiere, Hans Nieswandt, Henry Storch, Lloyd Attrill, Matt Fox, Mick Farrer, Mike Thompson, Miss Kelly Marie, Mousse T., Mr. Brown, Rainer Trüby, Ralph Tee, Rob Wigley, Smudo, Steve Hobbs, Supergid, Tom Kaiser	Bernd Niedergesäß, Kenny B.
BSW #5; April 15 to 17, 2011	Roy Ayers, The Trammps, Gwen McCrae, Cassandra Steen, Joe Bataan, Eli "Paperboy" Reed, Ann Sexton, Gloria Scott, Marc Evans, Xantoné Blacq, Peppermint Jam Club Ensemble, Kaye-Ree	Crout, Dan D., DJ E.A.S.E., DJ Friction, Dr. Bob Jones, Eddie Piller, Gabriel Bouffiere, Hans Nieswandt, Henry Storch, Ian Dewhirst, Jazzie B., Jo Wallace, Lloyd Attrill, Matt Fox, Mick Farrer, Miss Kelly Marie, Mr. Brown, Perry Louis, Smudo, Steve Hobbs, Supergid, Tom Kaiser	Bernd Niedergesäß, Kenny B.
BSW #6; April 27 to 29, 2012	Former Ladies of the Supremes, Leon Ware, Sugarhill Gang, Roachford, Max Mutzke, Omar, Osaka Monaurail, Tortured Soul, Gloria Scott, Ann Sexton, Sharon Phillips, Mic Donet, George McCrae	Ash Selector, Crout, Dan D., DJ E.A.S.E., DJ Friction, Dr. Bob Jones, Eddie Piller, Ferry Ultra, G.I. Disco, Gabriel Bouffiere, Hans Nieswandt, Henry Storch, Ian Dewhirst, John Morales, Lloyd Attrill, Mick Farrer, Miss Kelly Marie, Mousse T., Mr. Brown, Rob Wigley, Smudo, Steve Hobbs, Supergid	Bernd Niedergesäß, Kenny B.
BSW #7; April 26 to 28, 2013	Rose Royce, Adeva, Brand New Heavies, Oliver Cheatham, The Reel People Sound System, Gloria Scott, Marc Evans, HopfSandKoke	Norman Jay, Eddie Piller, Smudo, Miss Kelly Marie, Les Spaine, Ian Dewhirst, Hans Nieswandt, Onur Engin, Mick Farrer, Steve Hobbs, Michael Reinboth, Henry Storch, Rob Wigley, Lloyd Attrill, Gabriel Bouffiere, Crout, Mr. Brown, Dan D.	Bernd Niedergesäß, Kenny B.
BSW #8; May 23 to 25, 2014	Lisa Stansfield, Bah Samba, Archie Bell, Candi Staton, D-Train Williams, Gloria Scott, Frank McComb, Wax da Jam, Nicole Willis & The Soul Investigators, Natasha Watts, The Teenagers, Ahonda	John Morales, Smudo, Mousse T., DJ Friction, DJ Ease/Nightmares On Wax, Hans Nieswandt, Miss Kelly Marie, Eddie Piller, Ian Dewhirst, Sarah Watts, Jürgen Drimal, Steve Hobbs, Mr. Brown, Henry Storch, Jonathan Fischer, Lloyd Attrill, Mick Farrer, Rob Wigley, Gabriel Bouffiere, Buzz-T, Javi Frias, Belli Bell, Crout, Supergid, Kenny B., Bernd Niedergesäß, Dan D., und mehr	Bernd Niedergesäß, Kenny B.
BSW #9; DJ-Weekender; November 21 to 23, 2014	–	Dr. Bob Jones, DJ Ferry, DJ Friction, Hans Nieswandt, Jazzy B., Joey Negro, John Morales, Norman Jay, Onur Engin, Perry Louis, Rebecca Vasment, Stereo MCs, Steve Hobbs, The Disco Boys, Victor Simonelli, und weitere	–
BSW #10; April 22 to 25, 2016	Lenny Williams, Ce Ce Peniston, Tavares, Jazzanova, Myles Sanko, James & Black, Gloria Scott, Byron Stingily, Sister Sledge, Tortured Soul, Rasmus Faber pres. RaFa Orchestra	Crout, Dan D., Dimitri from Paris, Divan Pan, DJ Friction, Eddie Piller, Hans Nieswandt, Henry Storch, John Manship, John Morales, Keb Darge, Lloyd Attrill, Michael Reinboth, Mick Farrer, Mirko Machine, Miss Kelly Marie, Mousse T., Ozi Celik, Smudo, Steve Hobbs, Supergid, The Reflex	Bernd Niedergesäß, Kenny B.
BSW #11; City-Weekender; May 20, 2017	Sugarhill Gang, Sons Of Time, Natasha Watts	Miss Kelly Marie, DJ Friction, Mr. Brown, Kenny B., Eddie Piller, Mick Farrer, Steve Hobbs, Henry Storch, Crout	–
BSW #12; April 20 to 21, 2018	Harold Melvin & the Blue Notes, Joy Denalane, Imagination featuring Leee John, Artful Dodger, Laville, Seven, D’Influence, Margie Joseph, Flo Mega, Gloria Scott, Alana feat. P2C Note: Instead of Laville, Leroy Hutson was originally intended, but had to cancel for family reasons.	Mousse T., John Morales, Smudo, The Reflex, DJ Friction, Assoto Sounds, Eddie Piller, Mirko Machine, Hans Nieswandt, Mr. Brown, Ferry Ultra, Miss Kelly Marie, Steve Hobbs, Mick Farrer, Lloyd Attrill, Rob Wigley, Divan Pan, Crout, Supergid, Bernd Niedergesäß, Kenny B., Dan D., Akim B. Note: Henry Storch, who has been an integral part of the DJ program since the first edition of the Baltic Soul Weekender, died on 26 February 2018. Different DJs thought of him in memory several times with a ‘Tribute to Henry Storch’.	Bernd Niedergesäß, Kenny B.
BSW #13; May 10 to 12, 2019	Boney M., Cool Million, Eddie Holman, Fatcat, Gloria Scott, Pat Appleton, Kaiit, Odyssey, Ruby Andrews, The Everettes, The Supremes	Assoto Sounds, DJ Friction, Smudo, Eddie Piller, Ferry Ultra, Hans Nieswandt, Mirko Machine, Miss Kelly Marie, Mousse T., Mr. Brown, The Reflex, Akim B., Bob Masters, Dan D., Kenny B., Levanna McLean, Lloyd Attrill, Mick Farrer, Noble & Heath, Sophie Lloyd, Steve Hobbs, Supergid	Kenny B., Akim B.
BSW #14; May 1 to 3, 2020	Canceled due to COVID-19 pandemic in Germany		
BSW #15; April 23 to 25, 2021	Rescheduled due to COVID-19 pandemic in Germany		
BSW #15; November 26 to 28, 2021	Canceled due to COVID-19 pandemic in Germany		
BSW #16; April 29 to May 1, 2022	Gloria Scott, Cunnie Williams, The Blackbyrds, Kraak & Smaak, Danny Clay's Luther Vandross Show, Moment of Truth, Jan Delay & Disko No. 1, The Everettes, Myles Sanko	Mr. Brown, Sidney Duteil, Mirko Machine, Ferry Ultra, Mousse T., DJ Friction, Mick Farrer, Noble & Health, Dan D., Eddie Piller, Levanna McLean, Mike Vitti, Rainer Trüby, Akim B., Steve Hobbs, Assoto Sounds, Horse Meat Disco, Miss Kelly Marie, Lloyd Attrill, Bernd Niedergesäß	Bernd Niedergesäß, Akim B.
BSW #17; May 5 to 7, 2023	Heatwave, The Real Thing, Tortured Soul, Linda Clifford, Jimmy „Bo“ Horne, Aloe Blacc, Mamas Gun, The Everettes, Milton Wright	Supergid, Ash Selector, Mousse T., Steve Hobbs, Bernd Niedergesäß, Mick Farrer, Akim B., Lloyd Attrill, Levanna McLean, Dan D., Eddie Piller, Rob Wrigley, Crout, Sidney Duteil, Mike Vitti, DJ Friction, Richard Marinus, Mr. Brown, DJ Mad, Ferry Ultra, Bobby & Steve, Miss Kelly Marie, Mirko Machine	Bernd Niedergesäß, Akim B.
BSW #18; May 3 to 5, 2024	Glenn Jones, Leela James, Mario Biondi, Joel Sarakula, The Terri Green Project, Kenny Thomas, Sister Sledge, Sera Kalo, The Everettes Note: For safety reasons, the program in the tent had to be interrupted on Friday due to a severe weather warning and was delayed by about two hours, resulting in shortened performances by the scheduled artists. On Saturday, Byron Stingily appeared on stage as a surprise guest.	Supergid, Mr. Brown, Mousse T., Steve Hobbs, Bernd Niedergesäß, Mick Farrer, Akim B., Jens Lissat, Rainer Trüby, Lloyd Attrill, Eddie Piller, Dan Dombrowe, Levanna McLean, Sidney Duteil, Mike Vitti, DJ Friction, Miss Kelly Marie, Robbie Leslie, Ash Selector, Ferry Ultra, John Manship, Richard Marinus Note: Nilz Bokelberg's performance was cancelled due to technical issues.	Bernd Niedergesäß, Akim B., and guests
BSW #19; May 23 to 25, 2025	Supergid, The Jones Girls, The Three Degrees, Incognito, Jean Carn, The Everettes, Oscar „Chucky“ Cordero, The Brooks, Byron Stingily, Stereo MC's, Tito Puente Jr. Note: Double Exposure were originally scheduled instead of the Three Degrees. On Saturday, the Weather Girls performed as a surprise act.	Kruder & Dorfmeister, Steve Hobbs, Bernd Niedergesäß, Mick Farrer, Akim B., DJ Friction, The Shapeshifters, Frank Popp, Levanna McLean, Lloyd Attrill, Eddie Piller, Dan Dombrowe, Michela Cini, Sidney Duteil, Mike Vitti, Richard Marinus, Mr. Brown, Ferry Ultra, The Humble Dapper, Angelo Romeu, Captain Funk Nord, Michael Gray, Ash Selector, Nilz Bokelberg, Robbie Leslie, Miss Kelly Marie	Bernd Niedergesäß, Akim B., and guests
BSW #20; 2027 (planned)			

== Compilations ==
Five Baltic Soul Weekender compilation albums with rare songs have been released on vinyl (only volume 2 to 5) and CD. The following tables contain the track listings of the LPs, released with fewer tracks, and CDs.

=== #1 – Weekender Anthems ===
Track (LP)	Track (CD)	Artist	Songname
—	1	Joyce Sims	Come Into My Life
—	2	Harold Melvin and the Blue Notes	Wake Up Everybody
—	3	Walter Jackson	Touching In The Dark
—	4	Billy Paul	Bring The Family Back
—	5	Leela James	Good Time
—	6	Joey Negro pres. The Sunburst Band	Everyday
—	7	Jon Lucien	Would You Believe In Me
—	8	Lou Rawls	See You When I Get There
—	9	McFadden & Whitehead	Ain't No Stopping Us Now
—	10	Otis Clay	The Only Way Is Up
—	11	Pockets	Come Go With Me
—	12	Teddy Pendergrass	The More I Get, The More I Want
—	13	Jackie Wilson	(Your Love Keeps Lifting Me) Higher And Higher
—	14	Al Green	Let's Stay Together
—	15	Maze	Joy And Pain

=== #2 – Soulful & Funk 70's ===
Track (LP)	Track (CD)	Artist	Songname
A1	1	Flowers	For Real
A2	2	Dennis Taylor	Sometimes
A3	3	Dezzie	Move
—	4	Terry Callier	I Don't Want To See Myself (Without You)
A4	5	Marc Evans	The Way You Love Me (Dim's T.S.O.P. Version Part 1)
B1	6	Bennson	Whatever It Is
—	7	Marvin Gaye & Tammi Terrell	Ain't No Mountain High Enough (Ben Human Mix)
—	8	The Rebirth	Evil Vibrations
B2	9	Ray Munnings	Funky Nassau
B3	10	Lou Pride	It's A Man's World
B4	11	Lemuria	Hunk Of Heaven
—	12	Eli Goulart	Sunny
—	13	Flame ’n’ King & The Bold Ones	Ho Happy Day
—	14	Love Tambourines	Spend The Day Without You
—	15	Johnny King & The Fatback Band	Peace, Love Not War (K-Dope Productions Remix)

=== #3 – Philly Sound & Charity Projects ===
Track (LP)	Track (CD)	Artist	Songname
—	1	Rae & Christian feat. Bobby Womack	Get A Life
A1	2	Dee Edwards	(I Can) Deal With That
A2	3	Archie Bell & the Drells	Strategy
A3	4	Ce Ce Peniston	Somebody Else's Guy (David Morales Classic Old School Mix)
A4	5	Dee Dee Sharp-Gamble	Easy Money
A5	6	Wayne Brady	Back In The Day
A6	7	Gloria Scott	That's The Way Love Is
B1	8	Cool Million feat. CJ Anthony	Give Me My Love
—	9	Rahsaan Patterson	So Hot
B2	10	Jean Carn	If You Wanna Go Back
—	11	Don Thomas	Come On Train
B3	12	El Chicano	I'm A Good Woman
B4	13	Ann Sexton	Rising Up
B5	14	Patryce Banks	I Wanna Get Close To You
B6	15	Mario Biondi and The High Five Quintet	This Is What You Are

=== #4 – Soulful & New Dan's Classics ===
Track (LP)	Track (CD)	Artist	Songname
A1	1	Curtis Mayfield	You're So Good To Me
—	2	Avani feat. Rahsaan Patterson & Carl McIntosh	Watching You
A2	3	Archie Bell & the Drells	Don't Let The Love Get You Down
A3	4	Teddy Pendergrass	Heaven Only Knows
A4	5	Lucy Pearl	Don't Mess With My Man
A5	6	Gene Chandler	All About The Paper
A6	7	McFadden & Whitehead	I Heard It In A Love Song
—	8	Full Flava feat. Carleen Anderson	Was That All It Was
B1	9	The Haggis Horns	The Traveller, Part 2 (Edit)
B2	10	Billy Ocean	I Remember
—	11	Omar feat. Angie Stone	Stylin’
B3	12	Leroy Hutson	Lucky Fellow
B4	13	Roachford	Together
B5	14	George Jackson	Aretha Sing One For Me
B6	15	The Jackson 5	Big Boy

=== #5 – Modern & Classic Steppers ===
Track (LP)	Track (CD)	Artist	Songname
A1	1	Paris	I Choose You
—	2	Musiq Soulchild	Millionaire
A2	3	Harold Melvin and the Blue Notes	You Know How To make Me Feel So Good
A3	4	Raheem Devaughn	Woman
A4	5	Noel Gourdin	One Love
A5	6	The O'Jays	Use ta Be My Girl
B1	7	Garland Green	I’ve Quit Running The Streets
B2	8	Grey & Hanks	Dancin’
B3	9	The Trammps	Stop And Think (Alternate Mix)
B4	10	Gene Chandler	Let Me Make Love To You
—	11	Robin Thicke	Sidestep
—	12	Cee-Lo Green	I Want You (Original Jack Splash Mix)
B5	13	Lou Rawls	Lady Love
—	14	The Temptations	Aiming At Your Heart
—	15	Gladys Knight & the Pips	No One Could Love You More

== Charity ==
The Baltic Soul Weekender is a music festival, but also supports soul artists all over the world. The Baltic Soul Weekender makes it its business to support artists and take care of legal, social and financial aspects in their life.

== Other weekenders in Germany ==
- Hanseatic Soul Weekender
- Northern Soul Weekender Aachen
- Nürnberg Weekender
