= Tear Time =

Single by Wilma Burgess
- B-side: "(How Can I Write On Paper) What I Feel In My Heart"
- Released: July 1967
- Recorded: July 5, 1967; Nashville, Tennessee, U.S.
- Genre: Country; Nashville Sound
- Length: 2:35
- Label: Decca
- Songwriter: Jan Crutchfield
- Producer: Owen Bradley

Wilma Burgess singles chronology
"Fifteen Days" (1967)	"Tear Time" (1967)	"Watch the Roses Grow" (1968)

"Tear Time" is a 1967 single by Wilma Burgess. "Tear Time" was Wilma Burgess' fifth country hit. The single spent a total of sixteen weeks on the Billboard country chart peaking at number fifteen.

== Chart performance ==
Chart (1967)	Peak position
US Hot Country Songs (Billboard)	15

== Dave & Sugar version ==
"Tear Time"

Single by Dave & Sugar

from the album Tear Time
- B-side: "Easy to Love"
- Released: August 1978
- Recorded: 1978
- Genre: Country
- Length: 2:32
- Label: RCA
- Songwriter: Jan Crutchfield
- Producers: Jerry Bradley and Dave Rowland

Dave & Sugar singles chronology
"Gotta Quit Lookin' at You Baby" (1978)	"Tear Time" (1978)	"Golden Tears" (1979)

In 1978, Dave & Sugar had their second number one on the country chart with their version of the song.

=== Chart performance ===
Chart (1978)	Peak position
US Hot Country Songs (Billboard)	1
Canadian RPM Country Tracks	3
