= I'll Love You More (Than You Need) =

"I'll Love You More (Than You'll Need)"

Single by Jeannie Seely

from the album I'll Love You More
- Released: October 1967
- Genre: Country
- Length: 2:43
- Label: Monument
- Songwriter(s): Hank Cochran
- Producer(s): Fred Foster

Jeannie Seely singles chronology
"These Memories" (1967)	"I'll Love You More (Than You'll Need)" (1967)	"Welcome Home to Nothing" (1968)

"I'll Love You More (Than You'll Need)" is a song written by Hank Cochran that was originally recorded by American country singer Jeannie Seely. Released in 1967 as a single by Monument Records, it became her third top ten single on the US country chart songs chart. The song also served as the title track to Seely's 1968 studio album I'll Love You More and received a positive response from critics following its release.

== Background and recording ==
Jeannie Seely broke through into the country music mainstream with 1966's "Don't Touch Me". The Hank Cochran-penned ballad later provided her with a Grammy award and became a top ten single for Seely. Her follow-up singles made the top 20 and would be followed by her top ten song "I'll Love You More (Than You Need)". Described as a ballad, the song was also penned by Hank Cochran and was produced by Fred Foster.

== Release, critical reception and chart performance ==
"I'll Love You More (Than You Need)" was released as a single by Monument Records in October 1967. The record label issued it as a seven-inch vinyl record and featured a B-side titled "Enough to Lie" (written by Seely). The song was given a positive review by Cash Box magazine who wrote, "Again penned by Hank Cochran, this pretty ballad is one of the highlights of Monument’s 'Jeannie Seely Month' for the month of October." When reviewing Seely's Greatest Hits on Monument compilation, Stephen Thomas Erlewine of AllMusic named the track as being among the disc's "great records".

Billboard believed it to be a "strong commercial entry" and predicted it would make their top ten list. "I'll Love You More (Than You Need)" debuted on the US Billboard Hot Country Songs chart on October 28, 1967. It spent 15 weeks on the chart, rising to the number ten position on January 6, 1968. It became Seely's second top ten Billboard chart single and fourth to place in the top 20. It also her fifth single to reach the chart's top 40 list. It served as the lead track to her 1968 studio album, also titled I'll Love You More.

== Track listing ==
7" vinyl single

- "I'll Love You More (Than You Need)" – 2:43
- "Enough to Lie" – 2:35

== Charts ==
=== Weekly charts ===
Weekly chart performance for "I'll Love You More (Than You Need)"
Char (1967–1968)	Peak position
US Hot Country Songs (Billboard)	10
