= It's Only Love (Jeannie Seely song) =

Single by Jeannie Seely

from the album The Seely Style
- B-side: "Then Go Home to Her"
- Released: September 1966
- Genre: Country
- Length: 3:39
- Label: Monument
- Songwriter(s): Hank Cochran
- Producer(s): Fred Foster

Jeannie Seely singles chronology
"Don't Touch Me" (1966)	"It's Only Love" (1966)	"A Wanderin' Man" (1966)

"It's Only Love" is a song written by Hank Cochran that was originally recorded by American country artist Jeannie Seely. It was released by Monument Records as a single in September 1966, rising to the US country songs top 20. It was given positive reviews from music publications following its release and was included on her debut studio album The Seely Style.

== Background, content and recording ==
Known for her soul-inspired style, Jeannie Seely rose to country music stardom with 1966's "Don't Touch Me". The song was a US top ten single and later won her a Grammy award. Her success would lead to several more top 20 songs in its wake, including the follow-up single to "Don't Touch Me" titled "It's Only Love". Like its predecessor, "It's Only Love" was also written by Hank Cochran and tells the story of a woman who has difficulty getting over a former lover. The song was produced by Fred Foster.

== Release, critical reception and chart performance ==
"It's Only Love" was released as a single by Monument Records in September 1966. The label distributed it as a seven-inch vinyl record and featured a B-side called "Then Go Home to Her". "It's Only Love" received positive reviews from music publications following its release. Billboard called it an "emotional ballad" as well as a "solid follow-up" to her previous release. Cash Box described it as a "tender slow shufflin' weeper" and believed it would make both the US country and pop charts. The single entered the US Billboard Hot Country Songs chart on September 10, 1966 and spent 15 weeks on the survey. By October 29, it reached the number 15 position on the country songs chart, becoming her second top 20 record in her career and her second single released with the Monument label. It was included in Seely's debut studio album titled The Seely Style.

== Track listing ==
7" vinyl single

- "It's Only Love" – 3:38
- "Then Go Home to Her" – 2:51

== Charts ==
=== Weekly charts ===
Weekly chart performance for "It's Only Love"
Chart (1966)	Peak position
US Hot Country Songs (Billboard)	15
