= Golden Tears =

Single by Dave & Sugar

from the album Stay with Me/Golden Tears
- B-side: "Feel Like a Little Love"
- Released: January 1979
- Recorded: 1978
- Genre: Country
- Length: 2:28
- Label: RCA; 11427
- Songwriter(s): John Schweers
- Producer(s): Jerry Bradley and Dave Rowland

Dave & Sugar singles chronology
"Tear Time" (1978)	"Golden Tears" (1979)	"Stay with Me" (1979)

"Golden Tears" is a song written by John Schweers, and recorded by American country music trio Dave & Sugar (Dave Rowland, Etta Britt). It was released in January 1979 as the first single and partial title track from the album Stay with me/Golden Tears. The song was the group's third and final No. 1 hit on the Billboard magazine Hot Country Singles chart. The song was Dave & Sugar's only multi-week chart-topper, spending three at No. 1 in March. The trio enjoyed several more top 10 singles thereafter before beginning to fade in popularity during the early 1980s.

== Background ==
Country music journalist Tom Roland called "Golden Tears" a "highly coincidental release." Dave & Sugar frontman Dave Rowland, it seemed, had driven Chevrolets for most of his life, including the early period of Dave & Sugar's national success. However, Rowland had just purchased a new Lincoln when he heard the demo tape for the song. The song's first line in the refrain: "From a Chevy to a Lincoln ... ."

== Content ==
The song is about a woman who marries a rich man for his money, but quickly realizes that money does not necessarily buy happiness. In one sense, it is also about life in the fast lane and, as Roland put it, "supported the adage, 'it's lonely at the top.'"

== Chart performance ==
Chart (1979)	Peak position
US Hot Country Songs (Billboard)	1
Canadian RPM Country Tracks	2
