= When It's Over =

"When It's Over" may refer to:

- "When It's Over" (Jeannie Seely song), a 1967 single by Jeannie Seely
- "When It's Over" (Loverboy song), a 1982 single by Loverboy
- "When It's Over" (Sugar Ray song), a 2001 single by Sugar Ray
