= Dave & Sugar =

American country trio (1975–1982)

- Origin: Nashville, Tennessee, U.S.
- Genres: Country
- Years active: 1975–1982
- Labels: RCA, Elektra
- Past members: Lisa Alvey; Etta Britt as M. Dean; Jackie Frantz; Vicki Hackeman; Jamie Kaye; Regina Leigh; Lori Mason; Sue Powell; Dave Rowland; Cindy Smith

Dave & Sugar was an American pop-styled country music trio which enjoyed its peak success in the mid- to late-1970s. The trio consisted of lead singer Dave Rowland and initially on backing vocals, Vicki Hackeman and Jackie Frantz. Over time, the female members ("Sugar") of the group changed: Frantz was replaced by Sue Powell in 1977, who in turn was replaced by Jamie Kaye in 1980, while Hackeman was replaced by Melissa Dean (Etta Britt) in January 1979. Overall, Dave & Sugar charted 16 times on the Billboard country charts, including three No. 1 hits: "The Door Is Always Open", "Tear Time" and "Golden Tears". Powell also had two chart singles outside the group. Dave & Sugar were sometimes called "The country ABBA" because of their slickly produced sound as well as blend of male and female voices.

== Background ==
The trio was founded and fronted by Dave Rowland, born in Sanger, California, raised in Los Angeles, California (January 26, 1944 – November 1, 2018), while two female vocalists made up the "Sugar" part. The "Sugar" line-up changed several times during the group's run of success, while the two original singers were Jackie Frantz and Vicki Hackeman.

Before forming Dave & Sugar, Rowland was part of J.D. Sumner and the Stamps Quartet (who was touring with Elvis Presley at the time), and later the Four Guys. He also was a prominent member of country singer Charley Pride's road show. By 1975, with Pride looking for a backup band, Rowland hired Frantz and Hackeman, and Dave & Sugar was formed. They signed a deal with RCA Records.

The trio's first single, "Queen of the Silver Dollar" (written by Shel Silverstein, and originally recorded by Dr. Hook in 1972, and also included on Emmylou Harris' debut solo album earlier in 1975) broke into the Top 25 of Billboard's country singles chart in early 1976. Their next single, "The Door Is Always Open", became their first No. 1 hit in July. Their peak run garnered nearly one dozen Top 10 singles, including two more No. 1 hits - "Tear Time" (1978) and "Golden Tears" (1979).

Rowland disbanded the trio briefly during the early 1980s to try a solo career, releasing an album entitled (appropriately) Sugar Free and charting two singles of his own. Powell also charted two singles on RCA as a soloist, and later went on to host the TV series Nashville on the Road. Rowland later reformed the trio with two new sets of "Sugar" partners: Cindy Smith and Lisa Alvey, followed by Regina Leigh and Lori Mason. However, these second-era trios failed to gain the popularity the original trios had in the 1970s and the group disbanded for good after only minimal success. In 1997, former Sugar member Leigh formed the short-lived country duo Regina Regina with partner Regina Nicks.

On November 1, 2018, Rowland died due to complications from a stroke in his Nashville home at the age of 74.

== Discography ==
=== Albums ===
Year	Album	Chart Positions			Label
Year	Album	US Country	US	CAN Country	Label
1976	Dave & Sugar	3	—	—	RCA Victor
1977	That's the Way Love Should Be	10	157	—	RCA Victor
1978	Tear Time	8	—	4	RCA Victor
1979	Stay with Me / Golden Tears	20	—	—	RCA Victor
1980	New York Wine Tennessee Shine	47	—	—	RCA Victor
1981	Greatest Hits	35	179	—	RCA Victor
1981	Pleasure	31	—	—	Elektra

==== Dave Rowland solo albums ====
Year	Album	Chart Positions	Label
Year	Album	US Country	Label
1982	Sugar Free	56	Elektra

=== Singles ===
Year	Single	Chart Positions					Album
Year	Single	US Country	US AC	AUS	CAN Country	CAN AC	Album
1975	"Queen of the Silver Dollar"	25	—	61	21	—	Dave & Sugar
1976	"The Door Is Always Open"	1	—	84	1	—	Dave & Sugar
1976	"I'm Gonna Love You"	3	—	—	2	—	Dave & Sugar
1977	"Don't Throw It All Away"	5	32	—	5	34	That's the Way Love Should Be
1977	"That's the Way Love Should Be"	7	45	—	6	33	That's the Way Love Should Be
1977	"I'm Knee Deep in Loving You"	2	—	—	4	—	That's the Way Love Should Be
1978	"Gotta' Quit Lookin' at You Baby"	4	—	—	9	—	Tear Time
1978	"Tear Time"	1	—	—	3	—	Tear Time
1979	"Golden Tears"	1	—	—	2	—	Stay with Me / Golden Tears
1979	"Stay with Me"	6	—	—	—	—	Stay with Me / Golden Tears
1979	"My World Begins and Ends with You"/"Why Did You Have to Be So Good" (Note: "My World Begins and Ends with You"/"Why Did You Have to Be So Good" charted as a double A-side in the United States, but only "My World Begins and Ends with You" charted in Canada.)	4	—	—	7	—	Stay with Me / Golden Tears
1980	"New York Wine and Tennessee Shine"	18	—	—	10	—	New York Wine Tennessee Shine
1980	"A Love Song"	40	—	—	—	—	New York Wine Tennessee Shine
1981	"It's a Heartache"	32	—	—	37	—	Greatest Hits
1981	"Fool By Your Side" (Note: Credited to "Dave Rowland & Sugar".)	6	—	—	—	—	Pleasure
1981	"The Pleasure's All Mine"	32	—	—	—	—	Pleasure

==== Dave Rowland solo singles ====
Year	Single	Chart Positions	Album
Year	Single	US Country	Album
1982	"Natalie"/"Why Didn't I Think of That" (Note: Charted as a double A-side.)	77	Sugar Free
1982	"Lovin' Our Lives Away"	84	Sugar Free

==== Sue Powell solo singles ====
Year	Single	Chart Positions
Year	Single	US Country
1981	"Midnite Flyer"	57
1981	"(There's No Me) Without You"	49

== Awards ==
Country Music Association
Year	Nominated work	Category	Result	Notes
1976	"The Door Is Always Open" - RCA	Single of the Year	Nominated	Dave Rowland, Jackie Frantz, Vicki Hackeman
1976	Dave & Sugar	Vocal Group of the Year	Nominated	Dave Rowland, Jackie Frantz, Vicki Hackeman
1977	Dave & Sugar	Vocal Group of the Year	Nominated	Dave Rowland, Sue Powell, Vicki Hackeman
1978	Dave & Sugar	Vocal Group of the Year	Nominated	Dave Rowland, Sue Powell, Etta Britt (as M.Dean)
1979	Dave & Sugar	Vocal Group of the Year	Nominated	Dave Rowland, Sue Powell, Etta Britt
