= Baby (Wilma Burgess song) =

Single by Wilma Burgess

from the album Don't Touch Me
- B-side: "Wait Till the Sun Comes Up"
- Released: November 1965
- Recorded: September 24, 1965; Nashville, Tennessee, U.S.
- Genre: Country; Nashville sound
- Length: 2:51
- Label: Decca
- Songwriter: Ray Griff
- Producer: Owen Bradley

Wilma Burgess singles chronology
"The Closest Thing to Love" (1965)	"Baby" (1965)	"Don't Touch Me" (1966)

"Baby" is a song written by Ray Griff and recorded by American country artist Wilma Burgess. It was released as a single in November 1965 by Decca Records.

== Background and reception ==
"Baby" was recorded at the Columbia Recording Studio on September 24, 1965. Located in Nashville, Tennessee, the session was produced by renowned country music producer Owen Bradley. Two additional tracks were recorded during this session.

"Baby" peaked at number seven on the Billboard Hot Country Singles chart in early 1966. The song became her first major hit and be one of several major hits for Burgess during the 1960s. "Baby" was issued on her debut studio album in 1966 entitled Don't Touch Me.

== Track listing ==
7" vinyl single

- "Baby" – 2:51
- "Wait Till the Sun Comes Up" – 2:05

== Charts ==
Chart (1966)	Peak position
US Hot Country Singles (Billboard)	7
