= Vince Mira =

American musician

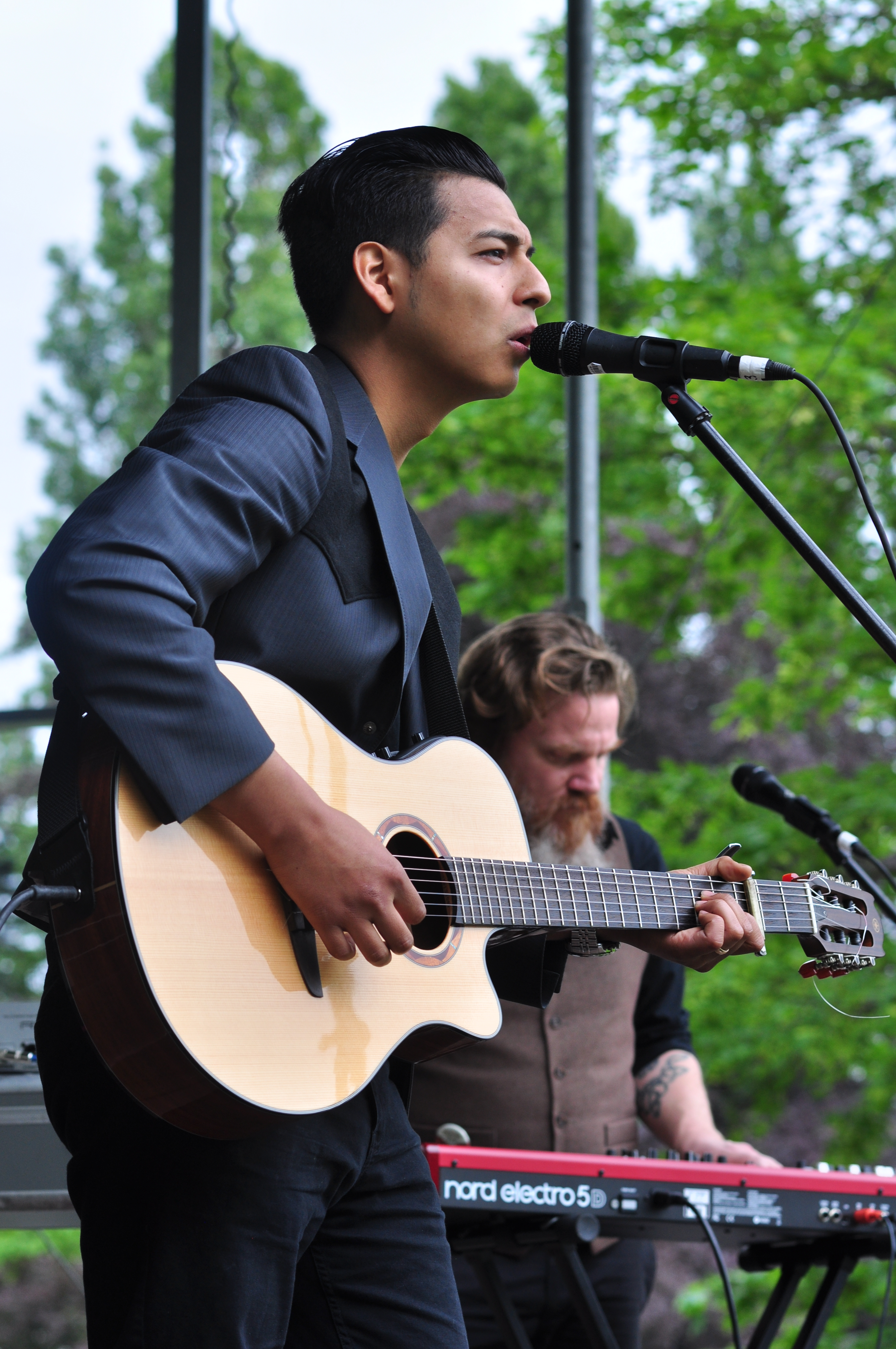
Vince Mira and his band play the 2018 Northwest Folklife Festival, Seattle Center, Seattle, Washington.

Vince Mira (born March 18, 1992) is a singer/songwriter from Seattle, Washington who specializes in country, rock n roll and Spanish Americana music. His deep bass-baritone voice has drawn comparisons to Johnny Cash. His repertoire consists of several Johnny Cash and Hank Williams songs, as well as his own originals.

== Life ==
Born in Los Angeles, California, and raised in San Antonio, Texas. Vince subsequently moved to Federal Way, Washington. His career began playing Spanish-language songs in Seattle's Pike Place Market. There he was discovered by producer Chris Snell. His similarity to Johnny Cash caught the ear of Cash's son, John Carter Cash, and led to John producing Mira's first record. Vince has appeared on Good Morning America and The Ellen DeGeneres Show, and has done appearances for Seattle's KOMO-TV News. As of late 2008, he is assisting Pearl Jam's Stone Gossard with a Hank Williams tribute CD, as well as touring with Gossard as part of Timberland's EarthKeeper project. Since 2007, Vince has been backed by the band The Roy Kay Trio.

== Discography ==
Cash Cabin Sessions, released in 2008 by Lucky Rebel Records, is Vince Mira's first EP. Executive producer Chris Snell, with assistance from Cash's son, John Carter Cash, aided Mira in the release. The recording consists of several Johnny Cash covers, including "Blistered", "Ring of Fire", and a Spanish-language version of "Ring of Fire", as well as two of his own compositions, "Cold Hearted Woman" and "Closer".

In June 2017 Mira released his third album “El Radio” Consisting of all original material. The album took Vince in a new direction musically with songs written in both Spanish and English.
