= The Dixiebelles =

American girl group

The Dixiebelles were an American girl group briefly popular in the early 1960s. Their best-known single, "(Down at) Papa Joe's", hit #9 on the Billboard Hot 100 late in 1963, and the follow-up, "Southtown U.S.A.", hit #15 early in 1964. Both these songs were produced by Bill Justis and released on Sound Stage 7 Records, a division of Monument Records. The name of the group is one word - The Dixiebelles - as listed on their records.

On record (at least for their first single, "(Down at) Papa Joe's"), The Dixiebelles were in fact all members of the Anita Kerr Singers.

Based in Memphis, Tennessee, the Dixiebelles touring group had all previously sung backup in various capacities. Several members had been in The Tonettes, who recorded one single for the Stax Records subsidiary Volt in 1962.

A full-length Dixiebelles album was released, but a third single ("New York Town") failed to hit the Hot 100, peaking at just #119 on Billboard's "Bubbling Under" chart. Shortly thereafter, their contract with Sound Stage 7 ended and they never released another single.

Mary Hunt and Mildred Pratcher later joined forces with Barbara McCoy and Eula Jean Rivers to form The Charmels, a group that recorded four non-hit singles for Stax between 1966 and 1968. Despite the band’s short run and relative obscurity, their 1967 song “As Long As I’ve Got You” earned a cult following after it was sampled in the Wutang Clan’s hit 1994 single “C.R.E.A.M”. Many music critics regard the sample as one of the most influential in rap history.

Shirley Thomas died on May 9, 2018, at age 74.

== Members ==
- Mary Hunt
- Mildred Pratcher
- Shirley Thomas (July 23, 1943 – May 9, 2018)
