= Wilma Burgess =

American country singer

Background information
- Born: Wilma Charlene Burgess; June 11, 1939
- Origin: Orlando, Florida, U.S.
- Died: August 26, 2003 (aged 64)
- Genres: Country
- Occupation: Singer
- Instrument: Vocals
- Years active: 1962–2003
- Labels: United Artists; Decca; RCA; Shannon
- Formerly of: Jody Miller, Eddy Arnold
- Website: Wilma Burgess Home Page

Wilma Charlene Burgess (June 11, 1939 – August 26, 2003) was an American country music singer. She rose to fame in the mid-1960s and charted fifteen singles on the Billboard C&W charts between 1965 and 1975.

== Background ==
Burgess was born and raised in Orlando, Florida, United States, the daughter of Jessie Willard Burgess and Arlene Johnson Burgess. Following her graduation from William R. Boone High School in 1956, she proceeded to Stetson University in DeLand, Florida, studying physical education. She had no interest in a musical career - although she had displayed her natural talent performing as a pop singer on local television - until hearing Eddy Arnold in concert awakened her passion for country music.

In 1960, a songwriter friend of Burgess persuaded her to go to Nashville to record some demos of his compositions. One of the publishers Burgess sang for asked to manage her singing career and Burgess cut her first single in 1962 for the United Artists label.

Eventually Burgess came to the attention of Owen Bradley, who heard in Burgess' voice the potential for a successor to the recently deceased Patsy Cline, whom Bradley had produced.

Bradley arranged for Burgess' signing with Decca where she had her first session in June 1964.

== Career peak ==
After three unsuccessful single releases, Bradley had Burgess record the Ray Griff song "Baby" on 24 September 1965: the track proved to be Burgess' breakout hit reaching No. 7 C&W.

Burgess' expertise with teary ballads was further exemplified with the follow-ups "Don't Touch Me" (#12 C&W) and "Misty Blue" (#4), and logically her successful versions of these C&W classic tunes would have consolidated Burgess' position as a major player on the Nashville scene.

However, Burgess' versions of both "Don't Touch Me" and "Misty Blue" were both overshadowed, the first by the concurrent release of a more successful version of "Don't Touch Me" by Jeannie Seely - for whom Hank Cochran (then Seely's husband) had written the song. Then "Misty Blue" - handed down to Burgess after being rejected by Brenda Lee - was shortly established as a trademark song for Burgess' prime influence Eddy Arnold, whose version in the spring of 1967 not only reached No. 3 C&W but became a regional pop hit reaching No. 57 nationally.

== 1967 on ==
Continuing to record with Owen Bradley, Burgess placed seven more singles on the C&W chart but only the first two of these: "Fifteen Days" (#24) and "Tear Time" (#15) both 1967 reached the Top 40.

Burgess association with Bradley and Decca Records ended in 1971; that same year she signed with Shannon a label owned by Jim Reeves Enterprises (Burgess was a close friend of Reeves' widow Mary Reeves). Five of Burgess' single releases on Shannon appeared on the C&W chart with the 1973 duet with Bud Logan "Wake Me Into Love" providing a one-off return to the Top 40 at No. 14.

In 1975, Burgess left Shannon signing with RCA Records, where her uneventful tenure lasted until 1978. In 1982, she ended her recording career with the album Could I Have This Dance on 51West a Columbia Records label. Burgess also worked on and off with Mary Reeves running the Jim Reeves Museum in Nashville.

Burgess was lesbian and preferred to record love songs with no gender-specific references. She did sometimes agree to record songs such as "Ain't Got No Man", on condition that her producer Owen Bradley let her record a song she liked but he did not. In September 1982, Burgess opened and operated a music venue called Track 9 located at 2025 8th Avenue South in Nashville. Burgess was part of the local lesbian community, and lesbians frequented Track 9 during its existence. The venue was located across the street from Nashville's first-known lesbian bar, The Women's Room.

It has been noted by Jim Ed Brown that Burgess was also a fine poker player, having taken both Ernest Tubb and Tubb's bus driver's money while on tour together.

== Death ==
Burgess died unexpectedly on August 26, 2003, at Centennial Medical Center in Nashville, after suffering a heart attack. She was 64, and had been hospitalized for a week for tests, and had seemed to be on the road to recovery.

== Other information ==
- In 1965, Burgess purchased the Nashville home that had belonged to Patsy Cline; the purchase was made from Cline's widower Charlie Dick. Burgess had attended Cline's 30th birthday party and housewarming at the home six months before Cline's fatal accident. Burgess also purchased Jim Reeves' touring bus "Big Blue" in 1969.
- Burgess appeared in the 1966 film The Las Vegas Hillbillys singing "Baby". The film which starred Jayne Mansfield was a B-movie that showcased several top C&W performers.
