= Don't Touch Me =

1966 single by Jeannie Seely

Single by Jeannie Seely

from the album The Seely Style
- B-side: "You Tied Tin Cans to My Heart"
- Released: March 14, 1966
- Recorded: February 12, 1966
- Studio: Fred Foster Sound Studio, Nashville, Tennessee
- Genre: Country
- Length: 2:59
- Label: Monument
- Songwriter(s): Hank Cochran
- Producer(s): Fred Foster

Jeannie Seely singles chronology
"Today Is Not the Day" (1965)	"Don't Touch Me" (1966)	"It's Only Love" (1966)

"Don't Touch Me" is a song written by Hank Cochran. It was originally written for and recorded by American country artist Jeannie Seely. The song was released as a single on Monument Records in March 1966 and became a major Billboard country hit. "Don't Touch Me" became Seely's signature song and her biggest hit as a solo artist. It later appeared on her debut studio album and was re-recorded by Seely in later years.

"Don't Touch Me" has been covered by various artists, including country artist Wilma Burgess. Burgess's version was released shortly after Seely's recording. The song became a major hit for Burgess, as well, but reached a lower position on the Billboard country chart than Seely's. Burgess's cover of "Don't Touch" appeared on her studio album of the same name. It was also recorded by American rhythm and blues (R&B) artist Bettye Swann, whose version charted on the Billboard pop and R&B singles charts. "Don't Touch Me" has since been recorded in different musical genres by other artists.

== Background and recording ==
"Don't Touch Me" was originally written by songwriter Hank Cochran. Country artist Buck Owens had first wanted to record the track for himself, but Cochran was not set on having Owens record it. At the same time, Jeannie Seely had just moved from California to Nashville, Tennessee, to pursue a music career. Cochran had promised Seely the opportunity to collaborate musically. When she asked Cochran if the offer still stood, Cochran replied, "Yes, if you're going to let me make the decisions and do what I know is best for you." Seely agreed and in response, Cochran gave her the composition to record. Seely then signed with Monument Records in Nashville and recorded "Don't Touch Me" in her first session with producer Fred Foster. The session took place at the Fred Foster Sound Studio in February 1966. An additional track was cut during Seely's first recording appointment called "You Tied Tin Cans to My Heart".

== Release and chart performance ==
"Don't Touch Me" was released as a single in March 1966 on Monument Records. It was issued as a 7" single with "You Tied Tins to My Heart" on the release's B-side. By June, the single had reached number two on the Billboard Hot Country Singles chart. It was also her first and only track to reach the Billboard Hot 100, climbing to number 85. It was also her only single to reach the Billboard Adult Contemporary chart, peaking at number 29. The song was later released on her debut studio album, The Seely Style, which was also issued in 1966. "Don't Touch Me" was Seely's biggest hit as a recording artist and has since been considered her signature song. In 1967, Seely's original version of "Don't Touch Me" won the Best Female Country Vocal Performance accolade at the Grammy Awards. The song's success also led to an invitation for Seely to become a member of The Grand Ole Opry. She joined the cast soon after and has been an active member since.

"Don't Touch Me" helped jump-start Seely's recording career as a country artist. She found success with songs that evoked a similar musical style to "Don't Touch Me". These further country hits were popular for Seely in the 1960s and '70s. Examples of this were "It's Only Love" (1966), "I'll Love You More (Than You'll Need)" (1968), and "Lucky Ladies" (1974).

== Legacy ==
Since its release, Seely's version of "Don't Touch Me" has been praised and mentioned by various music journalists and writers. Publications have considered it both a "standard" and a "classic" in country music. Robert Christgau commented on its legacy in an article from the 1970s. "In 1966, Seely's 'Don't Touch Me' took country women's sexuality from the honky-tonk into the bedroom, even though it didn't end up there, and the on-again-off-again ache in her voice retained its savor afterwards," he wrote.

In 2003, Mary Bufwack and Robert K. Oermann called Seely's version "a throbbing song of unfulfilled passions". They also praised Seely's vocals on the track, describing her voice as having "aching conviction". In 2005, the Seely's version was featured in David Cantwell and Bill Friskics-Warren's book, Heartaches By the Number: Country Music's 500 Greatest Singles. In 2019, Ken Burns discussed her version in the PBS documentary Country Music. Burns described it as "a song of unfulfilled passion." In 2019, The Boot ranked it among their "Top 5 Jeannie Seely Songs" for it being able to prove that "women can sing about sex too."

== Track listings ==
1966 7" vinyl single (Monument Records)

- "Don't Touch Me" – 2:59
- "You Tied Tin Cans to My Heart" – 2:06

1981 7" vinyl single (Gusto Records)

- "Don't Touch Me" – 3:14
- "Can I Sleep in Your Arms" – 3:13

== Charts ==
=== Weekly charts ===
Chart (1966)	Peak position
US Adult Contemporary (Billboard)	29
US Hot Country Songs (Billboard)	2
US Billboard Hot 100	85

== Cover versions ==
Since its original recording, "Don't Touch Me" has been notably covered by several music artists in different genres. Among its first covers was by Tammy Wynette in 1967, whose version appeared on her debut studio album Your Good Girl's Gonna Go Bad. Ella Fitzgerald covered the tune in 1968 on her studio album entitled Misty Blue. In 1969, American R&B artist Bettye Swann released a version of the song as a single on Capitol Records. Swann's version became a top-40 hit on the Billboard Hot 100 and reached number 14 on the Billboard R&B singles chart. In 1994, country artist Lorrie Morgan recorded a version of the song for her studio album War Paint. In 1997, Etta James recorded "Don't Touch Me" for her studio album Love's Been Rough on Me.

=== Wilma Burgess version ===
"Don't Touch Me"

Single by Wilma Burgess

from the album Don't Touch Me
- B-side: "Turn Around Teardrops"
- Released: April 1966
- Recorded: March 24, 1966
- Studio: Columbia Recording Studio
- Genre: Country
- Length: 2:59
- Label: Decca
- Songwriter(s): Hank Cochran
- Producer(s): Owen Bradley

Wilma Burgess singles chronology
"Baby" (1965)	"Don't Touch Me" (1966)	"Misty Blue" (1966)

Among the notable covers of "Don't Touch Me" was a 1966 version recorded by American country artist Wilma Burgess. Burgess's version was recorded and released within a month of Seely's original. The song was recorded on March 24, 1966, at the Columbia Recording Studio in Nashville, Tennessee. The session was produced by Owen Bradley of Decca Records. In the same session, Burgess cut two other tracks including "Misty Blue", another major hit for Burgess in 1966. Her version of "Don't Touch Me" was released in April 1966, a month following the original version's release. The song also became a major hit, peaking at number 12 on the Billboard Hot Country Singles chart.

Burgess's version of "Don't Touch Me" was released on her 1966 studio album of the same name. Her vocal delivery of the song was given positive reviews following its release. In 2003, Mary Bufwack and Robert K. Oermann described her voice on the track (along with several other hits of this time period) as having "a warmth of tone" and a "yearning soprano". In 1966, Billboard Magazine reviewed the track alongside her album of the same name. "Wilma Burgess has two very important factors working in her favor on this LP -- 'Don't Touch Me' and 'Baby'," writers commented.

==== Track listings: 7" vinyl single ====
- "Don't Touch Me" – 2:59
- "Turn Around Teardrops" – 2:20

==== Weekly charts ====
Chart (1966)	Peak position
US Hot Country Songs (Billboard)	12
