= Fred Foster =

American record producer, songwriter, and music executive (1931–2019)

- Born: Fred Luther Foster; July 26, 1931; Rutherford County, North Carolina, U.S.
- Died: February 20, 2019 (aged 87) Nashville, Tennessee, U.S.
- Genres: Country, pop
- Occupations: Record producer, songwriter, music executive
- Years active: c.1948–2018

Fred Luther Foster (July 26, 1931 – February 20, 2019) was an American record producer, songwriter, and music business executive who founded Monument Records and Combine Music. As a record producer he was most closely associated with Roy Orbison, and was also involved in the early careers of Dolly Parton and Willie Nelson. Foster suggested to Kris Kristofferson the title and theme of "Me and Bobby McGee", which became a hit for Kristofferson, Roger Miller, and Janis Joplin, and for which Foster received a co-writing credit.

== Career ==
=== Early career ===
Foster left his family's farm in North Carolina at the age of 18 and moved near his sister's family in Washington, D.C., where he got a job working for the Hot Shoppes restaurant chain. While at work, he met popular area country music entertainer Billy Strickland, who invited Foster to one of his shows and sparked Foster's interest in songwriting. Foster began working for J&F Distributing Co. in Baltimore, where he launched the company's pop division. He started recording local acts, and supervised Jimmy Dean's debut hit, "Bumming Around".

In 1953 he started to work for Mercury Records, but clashed with the company's executives over his endorsement of rockabilly acts. In late 1955, he unsuccessfully tried to convince Fred Talmadge, Mercury's Marketing Director, to sign the 20 year old Elvis Presley, then still at Sun Records but with competing offers from both Atlantic and RCA Records. Foster then briefly joined ABC-Paramount, where he acquired the rights to George Hamilton IV's recording, "A Rose and a Baby Ruth", which became the company's first million-seller, and also signed Lloyd Price to the label.

=== Monument Records, Combine Music, and success ===
After working in record promotions for several years, in March 1958 Foster co-founded Monument Records and publishing company Combine Music with business manager Jack Kirby and well-known Baltimore disc jockey "Buddy" Deane. Founded in Washington, D.C., the label's name was inspired by the Washington Monument.

For the label's first release, Foster took Billy Grammer to RCA's Nashville studio to record "Gotta Travel On" with Chet Atkins. Having spent all but $80 of Monument's initial $1,200 of funding to record the song, Foster negotiated for Monument to be the first label distributed by London Records. Grammer's single, released in October 1958, was a crossover hit, reaching #4 on the U.S. pop chart, #5 on the U.S. country chart, and #14 on the U.S. R&B chart in 1959, selling over 900,000 copies. It also spawned a nationwide dance craze called "The Shag", and Foster and Dick Flood co-wrote "The Shag (Is Totally Cool)" by Billy Graves which reached number 53 on Billboard's Hot 100. Later that year, Monument co-founder "Buddy" Dean sold his 30% share of the company back to Foster.

In early 1959 Roy Orbison's manager and Acuff-Rose president Wesley Rose approached Foster about signing the singer to Monument Records, and Foster said yes. As Orbison began recording for the label, his signature sound was realized, leading to a string of 18 hit singles and five best-selling LPs, beginning with the 1960 release "Only the Lonely." Foster is credited for his part in the development of Roy Orbison's career and for producing Orbison's early hits, including "Only the Lonely" – his breakthrough hit – "Oh, Pretty Woman", "Running Scared", "In Dreams", "Crying", "It's Over", "Mean Woman Blues", "Pretty Paper", and "Blue Bayou". Writer Richie Unterberger has compared Foster to more widely known producers such as Phil Spector and Leiber and Stoller, for the way in which he expanded the range of instrumentation used on pop and rock'n'roll records, using orchestration and choirs of vocalists, as well as making extensive use of Nashville A-Team session musicians such as Charlie McCoy and Jerry Kennedy.

Recognizing he was spending more than half of his time in Nashville for recording sessions with Monument artists, Foster relocated Monument Records and Combine Music to Hendersonville. in 1960. In 1963, Foster expanded his label, forming the soul and R&B imprint Sound Stage 7. Its roster of artists included Joe Simon, the Dixie Belles, Arthur Alexander, and Ivory Joe Hunter.

From Orbison's departure from Monument in 1965, Foster worked mainly with country musicians. He played a significant role in Dolly Parton's early career, signing her to Monument in 1964, shortly after her arrival in Nashville, and overseeing her recordings, culminating with her first top-40 country hit, "Dumb Blonde", in 1967. Foster also produced recordings by Willie Nelson, Ray Stevens, Kris Kristofferson, Tony Joe White, Larry Gatlin, Charlie McCoy, Al Hirt, Boots Randolph, Jeannie Seely, Jerry Byrd, Billy Joe Shaver, Grandpa Jones, the Velvets, and Robert Mitchum. Foster suggested to Kris Kristofferson the title and theme of "Me and Bobby McGee", which became a hit for Kristofferson, Roger Miller, and Janis Joplin, and for which Foster received a co-writing credit.

=== Recording Studios ===
In 1964 Monument Records acquired the Sam Phillips Recording Service of Nashville, a recording studio in the top floor of the Cumberland Building, a former Masonic Lodge at 319 Seventh Avenue North in Nashville, which was renamed Fred Foster Sound Studios. Projects recorded at this studio include Roy Orbison's 1964 hit "It's Over", Charlie Rich's 1965 hit "Mohair Sam", Ronnie Dove's One Kiss For Old Times' Sake, and Sandy Posey 1966 hit "Single Girl". In late 1967 the studio's rental agreement was terminated when the Seventh Avenue building was sold (it would later be demolished) and Foster utilized Music City Records while securing a new location for his studio.

Foster found the ideal location for his company's new recording studios and offices. The building, on 16th Avenue at the end of Music Row, was originally built in 1903 as a Presbyterian church. Completed in 1969, Monument Recording Studios featured a 33 x 39 foot recording space with 23 foot high ceilings, a 19 x 27 foot control room, acoustic echo chambers, business office, and recreation room. The studio was operated by Monument until 1975, when it was purchased by Tommy Strong and Mort Thomasson, who operated it as Studio One for the next two years, when producer Chip Young bought it and operated it as a Nashville location of his Young 'Un Sound recording studio until 1989. The studios' history continued as Masterlink (1990-2010) and Southern Ground (2012-present).

=== Later activities ===
Foster sold the Monument label to Sony in the early 1980s. However, he remained active with his own Sunstone production company. He produced Willie Nelson's 2006 Grammy Award–nominated You Don't Know Me: The Songs of Cindy Walker and Nelson's collaboration with Merle Haggard and Ray Price, Last of the Breed (2007). The latter was the winner of the 2008 Grammy for Best Country Collaboration, for the track "Lost Highway". Foster’s final production was Dawn Landes’s Meet Me at the River (2018).

== Personal life and death ==
Foster was born in Rutherford County, North Carolina. His father was Vance Hampton Foster, and his mother was Clara Marcella (Weaste) Foster. He had three brothers and four sisters. After his father's death in 1947, Foster struggled for two years to run the family's farm and support his mother. He married Carol Jean Wallace on December 17, 1955.They had one son, Vance, and two daughters, Micki and Leah. They divorced in 1972. He married Lisa Gale Lawalin in 1978. They had two daughters Brit, and Kristen and divorced in 1990. Foster died in Nashville in 2019, aged 87, after a short illness.

== Honors ==
Foster was inducted into the Musicians Hall of Fame and Museum on October 12, 2009, and was inducted into the North Carolina Music Hall of Fame on October 11, 2012.

On March 29, 2016, it was announced that Foster would become a member of the Country Music Hall of Fame. He was inducted alongside fellow North Carolinians Randy Travis and Charlie Daniels on October 16, 2016.
