= 9th Annual Grammy Awards =

1967 US music awards ceremony

- Date: March 2, 1967
- Location: Los Angeles Music Center, California
- Hosted by: Kirk Douglas

Television/radio coverage
- Network: ABC

The 9th Annual Grammy Awards were held on March 2, 1967, at Chicago, Los Angeles, Nashville and New York. They recognized accomplishments of musicians for the year 1966. The 9th Grammy Awards is notable for not presenting the Grammy Award for Best New Artist. Frank Sinatra won 5 awards.

== Presenters ==
- Tony Randall - Introduced The New Vaudeville Band
- Robert Preston - Introduced Eydie Gorme
- Frankie Avalon & Buddy Greco - Introduced Ray Charles
- Liberace - Introduced the music video for Strawberry Fields Forever
- Godfrey Cambridge - Introduced The Anita Kerr Singers
- Pat Boone - Introduced Ella Fitzgerald
- Sammy Davis Jr.

== Performers ==
- Louis Armstrong - Mame
- Ray Charles - Crying Time
- The Anita Kerr Singers - A Man And A Woman
- Ella Fitzgerald - Satin Doll/Don't Be That Way

== Award winners ==
- Record of the Year
  - Jimmy Bowen (producer) & Frank Sinatra for "Strangers in the Night"
  - New Vaudeville Band for “Winchester Cathedral”
  - Herb Alpert & The Tijuana Brass for “What Now My Love”
  - Mamas And The Papas for “Monday, Monday”
  - David Houston for “Almost Persuaded”
- Album of the Year
  - Sonny Burke (producer) & Frank Sinatra for “A Man and His Music”
  - Herb Alpert & The Tijuana Brass for “What Now My Love”
  - The Beatles for “Revolver”
  - Maurice Jarre (conductor) for “Dr. Zhivago (Motion Picture Soundtrack)”
  - Barbra Streisand for “Color Me Barbra”
- Song of the Year
  - John Lennon & Paul McCartney (songwriters) for "Michelle" performed by The Beatles
  - Joe Darion & Mitch Leigh (songwriters) for “The Impossible Dream” performed by Richard Kiley
  - Bert Kaempfert, Charles Singleton & Eddie Snyder (songwriters) for “Strangers In The Night” performed by Frank Sinatra
  - Paul Francis Webster (songwriter) & Maurice Jarre (conductor) for “Somewhere, My Love (Lara's Theme)” performed by Ray Conniff
  - John Barry & Don Black (songwriters) for “Born Free”

=== Children's ===
- Best Recording for Children
  - Marvin Miller for Dr. Seuss Presents - "If I Ran the Zoo" and "Sleep Book"

=== Classical ===
- Best Classical Performance - Orchestra
  - Erich Leinsdorf (conductor) & the Boston Symphony Orchestra for Mahler: Symphony No. 6 in A Minor
- Best Classical Vocal Soloist Performance (with or without orchestra)
  - Francesco Molinari-Pradelli (conductor), Leontyne Price & the RCA Italiana Opera Orchestra for Prima Donna (Works of Barber, Purcell, etc.)
- Best Opera Recording
  - Georg Solti (conductor), Régine Crespin, Hans Hotter, James King, Christa Ludwig, Birgit Nilsson, & the Vienna Philharmonic Orchestra for Wagner: Die Walkure
- Best Classical Choral Performance (other than opera)
  - Robert Shaw (conductor) & the Robert Shaw Orchestra & Chorale for Handel: Messiah
  - George Bragg (conductor), Gregg Smith (choir director), the Gregg Smith Singers, the Ithaca College Concert Choir, the Texas Boys Choir & the Columbia Chamber Orchestra for Ives: Music for Chorus
- Best Classical Performance - Instrumental Soloist or Soloists (with or without orchestra)
  - Julian Bream for Baroque Guitar (Works of Bach, Sanz, Weiss, etc.)
- Best Chamber Music Performance - Instrumental or Vocal
  - Boston Symphony Chamber Players for Boston Symphony Chamber Players - Works of Mozart, Brahms, Beethoven, Fine, Copland, Carter, Piston
- Album of the Year - Classical
  - Howard Scott (producer), Morton Gould (conductor) & the Chicago Symphony Orchestra for Ives: Symphony No. 1 in D Minor

=== Comedy ===
- Best Comedy Performance
  - Bill Cosby for Wonderfulness

=== Composing and arranging ===
- Best Instrumental Theme
  - Neal Hefti (composer) for "Batman Theme"
- Best Original Score Written for a Motion Picture or Television Show
  - Maurice Jarre (composer) for Doctor Zhivago
- Best Instrumental Arrangement
  - Herb Alpert (arranger) for "What Now My Love" performed by Herb Alpert & the Tijuana Brass
- Best Arrangement Accompanying a Vocalist or Instrumentalist
  - Ernie Freeman (arranger) for "Strangers in the Night" performed by Frank Sinatra

=== Country ===
- Best Country & Western Vocal Performance - Female
  - Jeannie Seely for "Don't Touch Me"
- Best Country and Western Vocal Performance, Male
  - David Houston for "Almost Persuaded"
- Best Country & Western Recording
  - David Houston for "Almost Persuaded"
- Best Country & Western Song
  - Billy Sherrill & Glenn Sutton (songwriters) for "Almost Persuaded" performed by David Houston

=== Folk ===
- Best Folk Recording
  - Cortelia Clark for Blues in the Street

=== Gospel ===
- Best Sacred Recording (Musical)
  - Porter Wagoner & the Blackwood Brothers for Grand Old Gospel

=== Jazz ===
- Best Instrumental Jazz Performance - Group or Soloist with Group
  - Wes Montgomery for "Goin' Out of My Head"
- Best Original Jazz Composition
  - Duke Ellington for "In the Beginning God"

=== Musical show ===
- Best Score From an Original Cast Show Album
  - Jerry Herman (composer) & the original cast (Angela Lansbury, Bea Arthur, Jane Connell, Charles Braswell, Jerry Lanning & Frankie Michaels) for Mame

=== Packaging and notes ===
- Best Album Cover, Graphic Arts
  - Klaus Voormann (graphic artist) for Revolver performed by The Beatles
- Best Album Cover, Photography
  - Robert M. Jones (art director) & Les Leverette (photographer) for Confessions of a Broken Man performed by Porter Wagoner
- Best Album Notes
  - Stan Cornyn (notes writer) for Sinatra at the Sands performed by Frank Sinatra

=== Pop ===
- Best Vocal Performance, Female
  - Eydie Gorme for "If He Walked Into My Life"
- Best Vocal Performance, Male
  - Frank Sinatra for "Strangers in the Night"
- Best Performance by a Vocal Group
  - Anita Kerr for "A Man and a Woman" performed by the Anita Kerr Singers
- Best Performance by a Chorus
  - Ray Conniff (choir director) for "Somewhere My Love (Lara's Theme From Dr. Zhivago)" performed by the Ray Conniff Singers
- Best Instrumental Performance (Other Than Jazz)
  - Herb Alpert for "What Now My Love" performed by Herb Alpert & the Tijuana Brass
- Best Contemporary (R&R) Solo Vocal Performance - Male or Female
  - Paul McCartney for "Eleanor Rigby"
- Best Contemporary (R&R) Group Performance, Vocal or Instrumental
  - The Mamas & the Papas for "Monday, Monday"
- Best Contemporary (R&R) Recording
  - New Vaudeville Band for "Winchester Cathedral"

=== Production and engineering ===
- Best Engineered Recording - Non-Classical
  - Eddie Brackett & Lee Herschberg (engineers) for "Strangers in the Night" performed by Frank Sinatra
- Best Engineered Recording - Classical
  - Anthony Salvatore (engineer), Erich Leinsdorf (conductor), the Pro Musica Chorus & the Boston Symphony Orchestra for Wagner: Lohengrin

=== R&B ===
- Best R&B Solo Vocal Performance, Male or Female
  - Ray Charles for "Crying Time"
- Best Rhythm & Blues Group Performance, Vocal or Instrumental
  - Ramsey Lewis for "Hold It Right There"
- Best Rhythm & Blues Recording
  - Ray Charles for "Crying Time"

=== Spoken ===
- Best Spoken Word, Documentary or Drama Recording
  - Edward R. Murrow for Edward R. Murrow – A Reporter Remembers, Vol. I The War Years
