= James and the Giant Peach (musical) =

2010 American musical

- Music: Benj Pasek; Justin Paul
- Lyrics: Benj Pasek; Justin Paul
- Book: Timothy Allen McDonald
- Basis: James and the Giant Peach by Roald Dahl
- Premiere: 21 October 2010: Norma Terris Theatre, Chester, Connecticut
- Productions: 2010 Chester; 2012 Kennedy Center; 2013 Seattle; 2014 Toronto

James and the Giant Peach is a stage musical with music and lyrics by Benj Pasek and Justin Paul, and a book by Timothy Allen McDonald. It is based on the 1961 children's book of the same name by Roald Dahl.

After McDonald and Leslie Bricusse developed Charlie and the Chocolate Factory into a musical, using songs from the 1971 film adaptation, Dahl's widow Liccy granted the rights to develop James and the Giant Peach to McDonald. McDonald started assembling the creative team in 2005. Lynn Ahrens, Freddie Gershon, and Michael Kerker recommended the songwriting team of Benj Pasek and Justin Paul in 2008. After an audition where Pasek and Paul wrote three potential songs in a week, including two that would be worked into the show ("On Your Way Home" and "Property of Spiker and Sponge"), McDonald hired the duo.

The show was first staged by Goodspeed Musicals. This production was in talks to go to Broadway following the run. However, due to mixed critical response, it was further developed by the team. It has been re-worked since then and in 2015, the new version became available for licensing through Music Theatre International and is a popular show in youth and regional theatre. A cast recording of this new version was released in 2015. Two other versions (a Theatre for Young Audiences version and a Junior version) are also available and are utilized commonly by children's theatres.

== Synopsis ==
=== Act One ===
The curtain opens onto a stage that is empty except for a single ghost light as the overture comes to a close. Ladahlord, an unusual man, enters and welcomes the crowd to accompany him and watch a peculiar, genuine story unfurl. In "Right Before Your Eyes," he describes the adventure they are about to experience. The scene moves to James's bedroom at the Painswick Orphanage in London, England in 1959, where he sleeps with a scarf and glasses under his pillow. His parents were tragically killed by an escaped rhinoceros, so the scarf and glasses are all he has of them left. James recalls the tragedy in his dreams as he drifts off to sleep. He wakes up and clings to the scarf and glasses. A grasshopper and a ladybug (both puppets) enter; James calls them and promises not to hurt them. Since this is not the right place for them, James asks them to leave; He, on the other hand, has nowhere else to go, so he must remain. In "On Your Way Home", he wishes he could fly away with the ladybug and grasshopper to a warm and welcoming place where he belongs. James is informed that he is leaving the orphanage when the Matron Nurse comes in. It just so happens, he has two aunties residing in Dover - where James is initially from - who will take him in. James is told by the Matron Nurse that he cannot return to the orphanage, so he must follow their orders.

In Dover, we track down James' aunts, Spiker and Sponge on the footpath, picking pockets. They extol the virtues of the criminal profession they have chosen. Through charitable contributions to the police, they are able to continue their criminal activities without being caught. They receive a telegram from a passing Bobby-Cop informing them that James will be moving in with them. They are unsure of what to do with a child at first, but when they discover that they can make James their slave, they are overjoyed with their most recent purchase ("Property of Spiker and Sponge"). James is picked up at the train station by Spiker and Sponge. They promise the Matron Nurse that they will take good care of him, but they show him their true colors as soon as she leaves. James will live in the cellar when they take him home, which is a run-down cottage with an overgrown garden. The scarf and glasses, James's last remembrances of his parents, are then taken away by Spiker and Sponge, but James recovers them. His aunties let him know that the main explanation they have taken him in is so he can be their slave... furthermore, they then, at that point, immediately order him to chop down an old peach tree in the yard. A spider suddenly appears. Sponge eats it after Spiker kills it. James asks if they can go to the beach after seeing the seashore and his old friends from a distance. That's a great idea to Spiker and Sponge, but they go to the beach without James! In "Right before Your Eyes – Reprise 2," Ladahlord reminds the audience that a magic spell is about to happen. An earthworm and a centipede, both puppets, appear just as James is about to cut down the peach tree, despite feeling sorry for himself. The centipede pursues the worm, yet James mediates. James frightens the centipede. As James pursues the centipede, he collides with Ladahlord, who gives James an enchanted book with recipes for elixirs in it. In "Shake It Up," Ladahlord promises that if James chooses a spell from the book and consumes the potion, amazing and unbelievable things will occur. James selects crocodile tongues that slither as his spell. After James assists him with the spell, Ladahlord instructs him to consume the crocodile tongues by mixing them with water. He cautions James that whomever meets the crocodile tongues first will get the enchantment. James rushes to the well in search of water, but he trips and drops the bag's contents. The crocodile tongues pursue a grasshopper, a spider, a ladybug and a centipede.

When Spiker and Sponge return to the garden to find James, they are surprised to discover that the old peach tree has sprouted a peach, something that hasn't happened in years. The peach becomes increasingly larger. Sponge wants to eat it, yet Spiker won't let her... she realizes that individuals will pay cash to see such a peculiarity. Soon, journalists, Hollywood agents, and garden guild members arrive to see the magic peach. Spiker and Sponge realize that they won't do anything to earn a gazillion dollars. ("There's Money on That Tree"). Spiker and Sponge sign a number of contracts and receive substantial cash advances to use the peach in the future. James inquires if they can use the entire sum to relocate to the coast or travel. James points out that he was the one who made the peach grow, but Spiker and Sponge make it clear that they do not intend to include James in their wealth. His aunties call him a liar, taking and obliterating the last relics of his folks, at long last, letting him know that he should rest outside and insulting him that he can't take off, in light of the fact that he has no place else to go. James recognizes that he is stuck and needs to make a choice. He enters the peach ("Middle of a Moment") after spotting a door and leaving both his past and present behind.

Inside the peach, James experiences the bugs that ate the crocodile tongues. They are currently completely developed, human-sized animals that can talk. While Spider, Ladybug, Grasshopper, and Earthworm are more accepting, Centipede is wary of humans, including James. The peach suddenly moves forward. Its stem snaps from the tree, and it starts rolling ceaselessly, running over Spiker and Sponge. It travels through the village, across fields, and past a well-known chocolate factory (Our Adventure Begins!). James realizes that they are floating in the ocean when he comes out from the top of the peach. Grasshopper sings "Floatin' Along" to everyone, even though it's not clear where they are going (Ladybug thinks they're going to France). Earthworm and Centipede are less certain; they are concerned that they lack food and water and the peach is unsuitable for the sea. The group is on its way after Ladybug makes a sail for the peach with an additional pair of her bloomers.

=== Act Two ===
The journey has become more difficult after several days. James and the insect crew are dissatisfied, thirsty, and hungry because the bloomer sail has been ripped. They start chatting about what they're going to eat without any landmarks in sight. Centipede recommends that they eat James, yet Insect dismisses the thought. James whispers that he has an idea, but he doesn't think anyone will be interested in hearing it. He is reassured by Spider, so he suggests that they consume the peach, which will provide them with all the water and food they require. As they eat, Grasshopper fiddles a tune for them. James looks further into his bug partners, finding realities about them that he won't ever be aware... for instance, that Grasshopper's ears are on his stomach. James is encouraged to explore the world by Spider, who tells him that the world is full of strange and unfamiliar things ("Have You Even Begun to Wonder?").

James' aunts recover from being run over by the peach back in their garden. They are aware that, due to the fact that they have already taken the advance money, they will not be able to fulfill the contracts they have signed without the peach. In "A Getaway for Spiker and Sponge," they are advised to take the money and flee when they hear police sirens and helicopters overhead.

James has another bad dream while on the peach. James discovers how vile Spiker and Sponge really are when he and the insects start telling stories about them. They not only killed and ate Spider's fiance, but they also killed the entire family of Centipede, who were the best shoemakers in the land, until Spiker and Sponge fumigated them. Centipede disagrees with James' conclusion that Spiker and Sponge were truly awful: That is how all humans are, including James! Ladybug gets some information about his folks, and he lets his new companions know that his folks are no more. Ladybug clashes: "Everywhere That You Are" describes how James' parents are always by his side.

Ladahlord enters, camouflaged as a boat's watchman (" Right Before Your Eyes - Reprise 3"). He serves drinks to Spiker and Sponge, who are traveling by cruise ship in first class to New York City. Spiker and Sponge have just enough money to get to New York and resume their previous habit of stealing from Coney Island's boardwalk. Even though they have lost nearly everything, they still have each other (I Got You), and they lament that they have lost the peach when they were so close to having a fortune. Spiker and Sponge suddenly see the peach floating in the ocean from the ship's deck, and they demand that the ship "follow that peach!" On the peach, Centipede is feeling a piece nauseous. He vomits off the peach's side, which attracts a swarm of sharks. James and the insect crew are in serious danger when the sharks start eating the peach. A group of seagulls have also been attracted to the vomit from above. James has a great idea for everyone: they will attach themselves to the seagulls and fly away using the web of Spider as a rope. However, there is only one issue: how might they get the seagulls to fly to them so they can join the rope? James has a different plan. He promises that the then hesitant Earthworm will not be hurt as he persuades him to serve as bait. Earthworm calls the seagulls despite being dissatisfied with his work. As James' arrangement works, Earthworm turns out to be more sure about his job ("Plump and Juicy"). The peach will soon be in the air ("Right Before Your Eyes – Reprise 4").

Centipede is still convinced that James will turn against them, despite the fact that Earthworm is overjoyed with the outcomes of their most recent adventure. He suddenly slips and falls into the water as he clambers to the top of the peach and rails against James. While the other bugs impatiently wait to see if they will ever see either of them again, James enters to save him. James and Centipede reappear at long last. Centipede has lost all understanding regarding James; When this person put his own life in danger to save him, how can he believe that all humans are the same?

At that precise moment, they can see the Empire State Building from the top. They are aware that they have reached New York City! When they hear sirens, they realize that Spiker and Sponge are with the police on the ground attempting to bring the peach down. At first, they believe they are safe. A plane moving toward JFK Air Terminal flies through the silk strings appending the peach to the seagulls, and the peach tumbles from the sky, arriving on the tower of the Empire State Building, where it gets stuck ("Empire State/The Attack").

Sponge and Spiker hurry to James. Outwardly, they act relieved and happy to see him, but inwardly, they tell him how they will make him their slave once more—after they fumigate the bugs, naturally. James stands up to them and assures them that his new family will not be harmed. Spiker and Sponge are crushed when the peach falls to the ground after there is an odd rumbling. James wonders if it's wrong for him not to be sad. The bugs console him that it is acceptable for him to feel better. Centipede bids farewell and starts to leave when James stops him. ("On Your Way Home – Reprise"), James tells him that he should stay with them instead of leaving on his own; After all, they are a family together. Even though they are a strange family, they accomplish amazing things: Centipede designs shoes, Spider uses her web to build bridges, and Earthworm starts an activist group called BAIT: Bugs Against Insensitive Terminology. Although Ladybug and Grasshopper get married and have their own children, they always consider James to be their first son. In "Welcome Home," James goes from being the most alone child to living in the peach pit with a huge, loving family. In "Curtain Call," the cast reminds the audience that this was a true story that took place right in front of them.

== Characters and original casts ==
Character	Broadway Tryout (2010)	Seattle (2013)	Toronto (2014)	Cast Album (2015)
James Trotter	Ellis Gage; Justin Lawrence Hall	Mike Spee	Alessandro Constantini	Luca Padovan
Aunt Spiker	Ruth Gottschall	Jayne Muirhead	Nicole Robert	Jackie Hoffman
Aunt Sponge	Denny Dillon	Julie Briskman	Karen Wood	Mary Testa
Ladahlord *	Steve Rosen			Marc Kudisch
Grasshopper	Jim Stanek	Greg McCormick Allen	Stewart Adam McKensy	Christian Borle
Ladybug	Chelsea Packard	Kendra Kassebaum	Lana Carillo	Megan Hilty
Spider	Kate Wetherhead	Diana Huey	Saccha Dennis	Sarah Stiles
Earthworm	Destan Owens	Heath Saunders	Jacob MacInnis	Daniel Breaker
Centipede	Nick Gaswirth	Rich Gray	Dale Miller	Brian d'Arcy James

* In the Connecticut pre-Broadway production, the role of "Ladahlord" existed as "Marvo The Magician". Both characters served as partial narrators.

== Musical numbers ==
The following is the song list from the version currently available for licensing through Music Theatre International:

Act I

- "Right Before Your Eyes" - Company
- "On Your Way Home" - James
- "Property of Spiker and Sponge" - Spiker and Sponge
- "Shake It Up" - Ladahlord and Company
- "There's Money On That Tree" - Spiker, Sponge, and Company
- "Middle of a Moment" - James
- "Floatin' Along" - Insects and James

Act II

- "Have You Even Begun to Wonder?" - Insects and James
- "A Getaway for Spiker and Sponge" - Spiker and Sponge
- "Everywhere That You Are" - Ladybug, Grasshopper, Earthworm, and Spider
- "I Got You" - Spiker, Sponge, and Company
- "Plump and Juicy" Insects, James, and Company
- "Empire State/The Attack" Ladahlord and Company
- "On Your Way Home (reprise)" - James
- "Welcome Home" - Company

The Goodspeed Broadway tryout production opened with the song "Perfectly Perfect" during which James's life with his parents and their subsequent death is shown and was followed by "Shuffle On Through" in which James experiences being put through the system as an orphan. Beyond the other songs changing significantly in content and order, the other most notable difference is that "Right Before Your Eyes" had not yet been implemented.

== Productions ==
=== 2010 Chester ===
The musical premiered from 21 October 2010 to 21 November 2010 at Norma Terris Theatre in Chester, Connecticut. The musical itself was quite different from its source material, but honored it. Staged by Goodspeed Musicals, the cast featured young actors Ellis Gage and Justin Lawrence Hall playing James, Steve Rosen as Marvo The Magician, Ruth Gotschall as Aunt Spiker and Denny Dillon as Aunt Sponge. The show also featured Jim Stanek as the Grasshopper, Chelsea Packard (credited as Chelsea Krombach) as the Ladybug, Kate Wetherhead as the Spider, Destan Owens as the Earthworm, Nick Gaswirth as the Centipede, also with Nicholas Park, Minami Yusi, Marissa Palley, and Jessica Fontana (credited as Jessica Hershberg) in the Ensemble. The dance troupe Pilobolus were a large part of the production, bringing an innovative theatrical technique of using their bodies to create most of the set, specifically using shadow technique to create a majority of the special effects. The production was directed by Graciela Daniele, and featured musical direction by Chris Fenwick and dance arrangements by Sam Davis. The production was initially expected to go to Broadway but received mixed critical feedback and more room for development was seen. Benj Pasek and Justin Paul stated during the staging, "[W]e decided from the beginning that we were not writing a show for children [...] we are taking some of Dahl's darkness and expanding it even more."

=== 2012 Kennedy Center ===
A work-in-progress version of the musical played at the 2012 New Visions/New Voices festival, held at the Kennedy Center in May 2012 for plays in development written for young audiences. The 2012 Kennedy Center production was directed by Marty Johnson and Timothy Allen McDonald.

=== 2013 Seattle ===
In November 2013, a reworked version of the musical was presented at the Seattle Children's Theatre. After the 2010 production, the show underwent much revision, altering plot aspects and songs to appeal to a younger audience, the most notable of which were the omitting of the song "Perfectly Perfect" and the discontinuation of the use of Pilobolus. The character of Marvo, who, at times, was the narrator, was also gone, and it introduced "sophisticated" and "innovative" puppetry to depict some events, "including the show's title character, the Giant Peach." The set was also more elaborate than at Goodspeed.

Justin Paul said of the revised version: "It's certainly changed — and hopefully evolved — since we [premiered] the show at Goodspeed. Obviously, that was the first time we'd ever seen the show in front of an audience, so we learned a lot just from that… Now, we sort of put [a different] lens on it and said, 'It needs to be a show that is going to be engaging a young audience — targeted for all ages,' [...]"

Mike Spee, an adult, played James, Kendra Kassebaum played the Ladybug, and Julie Briskman and Jayne Muirhead played Sponge and Spiker, respectively. The cast also featured Rich Gray as Centipede, Heath Saunders as Earthworm, Greg McCormick Allen as Grasshopper, Diana Huey as Spider, with Vickielee Wohlbach, Ian Lindsay and Auston James in the Ensemble.

=== 2014 Toronto ===
In 2014, the musical made its Canadian premiere at the Young People's Theatre in Toronto, Ontario. Directed by Sue Miner, choreographed by Jen Shuber and musically directed by Jason Jestadt, it featured Alessandro Constantini as James, Lana Carillo as Ladybug, Saccha Dennis as Spider, Stewart Adam McKensy as Grasshopper, Jacob MacInnis as Earthworm, Dale Miller as Centipede, Nicole Robert as Aunt Spiker and Karen Wood as Aunt Sponge.

== Cast recording ==
When the new Seattle version of the show was made available for licensing by McDonald's company, Music Theatre International, a cast album was recorded and released in 2015 as a permanently free download along. With young actor Luca Padovan as James, this cast featured Marc Kudisch as Ladahlord, Jackie Hoffman and Mary Testa as Spiker and Sponge, respectively, Christian Borle as the Grasshopper, Megan Hilty as the Ladybug, Sarah Stiles as the Spider, Daniel Breaker as the Earthworm, and Brian d'Arcy James as the Centipede. This included bonus tracks of Megan Hilty's solo arrangement of "Everywhere That You Are" and Skylar Astin performing "Middle Of A Moment".

== Other versions ==
When Music Theatre International started to license the new version of the show in 2015, they put two other versions on the market; the Theatre For Young Audiences (TYA) version and a Junior version.

=== Theatre For Young Audiences ===
This version is like the full show but trimmed down to one act, most notably cutting "Middle Of A Moment" and "Have You Even Begun To Wonder?".

=== Junior Version ===
Like the TYA version, this is one act, omitting "Middle Of A Moment" and "Have You Even Begin To Wonder?". This, however, adds characters and features much larger cast and larger ensemble. It is rated G unlike the full and TYA versions which are rated PG.
