= Dynaflex =

Dynaflex may refer to:

- Dynaflex (RCA) a thin, lightweight vinyl phonograph record developed by RCA Records
- Dynaflex (material), a synthetic non-slip material, featured on the handle of the OKC-3S bayonet
- V-Power with Dynaflex technology, a variant of Shell V-Power motor vehicle fuel
- Dynaflex, a company contracted to make the 1940s Hafner Rotachute
