= Country Music (miniseries) =

American documentary television series

- Genre: Documentary
- Created by: Ken Burns
- Written by: Dayton Duncan
- Directed by: Ken Burns
- Narrated by: Peter Coyote
- Country of origin: United States
- No. of episodes: 8

Production
- Producer: Julie Dunfey
- Running time: 120 minutes (Episodes 1-6 and 8), 150 minutes (Episode 7)
- Production companies: Florentine Films; WETA-TV

Original release
- Network: PBS
- Release: September 15 – September 25, 2019

Country Music is a documentary miniseries created and directed by Ken Burns and written by Dayton Duncan that premiered on PBS on September 15, 2019. The eight-part series chronicles the history and prominence of country music in American culture.

== Production ==
Burns announced the miniseries in January 2014, with a projected airdate in 2018. Burns cited his ongoing work on other documentary projects as having affected progress on the series. Writer Dayton Duncan explained that the goal of the series was to demonstrate that country music "isn't and never was just one type of music. It was always this amalgam of American music and it sprang from a lot of very different roots and then, as it grew, it sprouted many different branches, but they're all connected." Burns filmed a total of 175 hours of interviews with 101 artists and other personalities for the series; some were recorded as early as 2012, and some of the interviewees (such as Little Jimmy Dickens, Roy Clark, Ralph Stanley, and Merle Haggard) died over the course of production.

== Broadcast ==
The miniseries premiered in the U.S. on September 15, 2019, as a series of eight two-hour episodes. As a prelude to the premiere, Burns hosted a concert special filmed at the Ryman Auditorium, featuring Dierks Bentley, Rosanne Cash, Rodney Crowell, and Marty Stuart among others, which aired September 8, 2019.

A completely reedited version produced in conjunction with BBC Four, consisting of 9 50-minute episodes, began airing in the UK on November 22, 2019.

== Cast ==
=== Interviewees ===
- Bill Anderson - Georgia
- Bobby Bare - Ohio
- Ray Benson - Pennsylvania
- Dierks Bentley - Arizona
- Bobby Braddock - Florida
- Harold Bradley - Tennessee
- Garth Brooks - Oklahoma
- Tony Brown - North Carolina
- Del Bryant - Tennessee
- Carlene Carter - Tennessee
- John Carter Cash - Tennessee
- Rosanne Cash - Tennessee
- Guy Clark - Texas
- Roy Clark - Virginia
- Cowboy Jack Clement - Tennessee
- Jessi Colter - Arizona
- Elvis Costello - England
- Rodney Crowell - Texas
- Manuel Cuevas - Mexico
- Charlie Daniels - North Carolina
- Little Jimmy Dickens - West Virginia
- Ralph Emery - Tennessee
- Fred Foster - North Carolina
- Joe Galante - New York
- Larry Gatlin - Texas
- Rhiannon Giddens - North Carolina
- Vince Gill - Oklahoma
- Douglas B. Green - Illinois
- Lloyd Green - Mississippi
- Merle Haggard - California
- Tom T. Hall - Kentucky
- Jeff Hanna - Michigan
- Emmylou Harris - Alabama
- Jan Howard - Missouri
- Wanda Jackson - Oklahoma
- Betty Johnson - North Carolina
- Naomi Judd - Kentucky
- Wynonna Judd - Kentucky
- Jerry Kennedy - Louisiana
- E. Jimmy Key - Alabama
- Kris Kristofferson - Texas
- Amy Kurland - Tennessee
- Brenda Lee - Georgia
- Les Leverett - Alabama
- Loretta Lynn - Kentucky
- Don Maddox - Alabama
- Bill C. Malone - Texas
- Barbara Mandrell - Texas
- Wynton Marsalis - Louisiana
- Kathy Mattea - West Virginia
- Charlie McCoy - West Virginia
- Bob McDill - Texas
- Reba McEntire - Oklahoma
- John McEuen - California
- Willie Nelson - Texas
- Dolly Parton - Tennessee
- Ralph Peer II - California
- Shannon Pollard - Tennessee
- Charley Pride - Mississippi
- Alice Randall - Michigan
- Don Reid - Virginia
- Allen Reynolds - Arkansas
- Margaret Ann Robinson - Tennessee
- Johnny Rodriguez - Texas
- Darius Rucker - South Carolina
- Randy Scruggs - Tennessee
- Ketch Secor - Virginia
- Jeannie Seely - Pennsylvania
- Jean Shepard - Oklahoma
- Billy Sherrill - Alabama
- Paul Simon - New Jersey
- Ricky Skaggs - Kentucky
- Connie Smith - Indiana
- Hazel Smith - North Carolina
- Ralph Stanley - Virginia
- Marty Stuart - Mississippi
- Eddie Stubbs - Maryland
- Mel Tillis - Florida
- Ray Walker - Mississippi
- Bud Wendell - Ohio
- Jack White - Michigan
- Hank Williams Jr. - Louisiana
- Holly Williams - Tennessee
- Mac Wiseman - Virginia
- Trisha Yearwood - Georgia
- Dwight Yoakam - Kentucky

== Music ==
The TV series presented country music from its earliest stars, such as the Carter Family, and Jimmie Rodgers, followed by influential singers of the likes of Hank Williams, Eddy Arnold, and Kitty Wells, through to notable acts of the second half of the 20th century such as Johnny Cash, Willie Nelson, Patsy Cline, Loretta Lynn, Dolly Parton, Conway Twitty, and Waylon Jennings, finishing in the 1990s. A five-CD soundtrack album of selected highlights of songs featured in the show, Country Music: A Film By Ken Burns, was released. The five-CD box-set was released on August 30, 2019, before the show aired, followed by two-CD, two-LP and digital versions released on September 13. It reached No. 1 on Billboard's Soundtrack Album Sales chart. It has sold 39,100 copies in the United States as of March 2020.

In support of the release of the miniseries, Bank of America produced a video of the song "Wagon Wheel", featuring a collection of musicians from across the United States, with the tag line "Nothing connects the country like country."

== Release ==
=== Home media ===
The film was released through PBS in the United States on Blu-ray disc and DVD on September 17, 2019. The series debuted at No. 6 on the Music Video Sales chart the week of September 28, 2019, climbing to No. 1 the following week, staying at the top position for eleven consecutive weeks.

Chart (2019)	Peak position
U.S. Music Video Sales (Billboard)	1

The 8-disc DVD/Blu-ray release of the documentary series also includes interviews from a large number of outtakes made by Burns during the production of the film. The biographical outtakes by various artists are featured on the special features of each of the three disc in the DVD release of the miniseries.

== Soundtrack ==
Country Music - A Film by Ken Burns (The Soundtrack)

Soundtrack album by Various
- Released: August 30, 2019 (5-disc edition); September 13, 2019 (2-disc edition)
- Genres: Soundtrack, Country music
- Length: 307 minutes (5 discs); 131 minutes (2 discs)
- Label: Legacy Recordings
- Producer: Various

== Episodes ==
No.	Title	Original release date	US viewers (millions)
1	"The Rub (beginnings to 1933)"	September 15, 2019	N/A
Early performers Fiddlin' John Carson and Uncle Dave Macon, the genre's roots in folk and Southern gospel, the formation of both WSM and the Grand Ole Opry, and Ralph Peer and the genre's first stars - the Carter Family and Jimmie Rodgers.
2	"Hard Times (1933-1945)"	September 16, 2019	N/A
Roy Acuff and Nashville's increasing role in the genre, singing cowboy acts such as Gene Autry, the western swing of Bob Wills, Dust Bowl refugee acts such as the Maddox Brothers and Rose and Woody Guthrie, the ASCAP boycott, and World War II.
3	"The Hillbilly Shakespeare (1945-1953)"	September 17, 2019	N/A
Bluegrass and honky-tonk emerge; Bill Monroe and Flatt & Scruggs pioneer the former, while Ernest Tubb, Lefty Frizzell, and Hank Williams exemplify the latter and Williams becomes country music's biggest star.
4	"I Can't Stop Loving You (1953-1963)"	September 18, 2019	N/A
The heyday of rockabilly, the career launches of Johnny Cash and Elvis Presley, the birth of Music Row and influx of new songwriters, and the dominance of the Nashville sound typified by Patsy Cline.
5	"The Sons and Daughters of America (1964-1968)"	September 22, 2019	N/A
Buck Owens ushers in the Bakersfield sound, Loretta Lynn and Charley Pride bring new viewpoints to a changing landscape, Merle Haggard emerges as the genre's great songwriting star, and Johnny Cash descends into self-destruction but returns artistically and personally triumphant.
6	"Will the Circle Be Unbroken? (1968-1972)"	September 23, 2019	N/A
As the industry and its audience react to the great social upheavals of the time, George Jones and Tammy Wynette emerge as great stars, and the Nashville songwriting scene is changed by the arrival of writers from outside the genre such as Kris Kristofferson.
7	"Are You Sure Hank Done It This Way? (1973-1983)"	September 24, 2019	N/A
"Outlaw" artists Willie Nelson and Waylon Jennings gain unprecedented artistic control of their careers, and the genre's identity broadens, with Dolly Parton and others achieving crossover success while artists from outside its conventions such as Emmylou Harris arrive.
8	"Don't Get Above Your Raisin' (1984-1996)"	September 25, 2019	N/A
Artists like Ricky Skaggs and Dwight Yoakam steer the genre back to its more traditional elements, Garth Brooks achieves levels of success unmatched by any previous country artist, and Johnny Cash ends his career with a series of unexpected but well-received albums.

== Reception ==
Country Music has received generally positive reviews from television critics. Review aggregator site Rotten Tomatoes gave the series an 84% fresh rating, based on 22 reviews. The aggregator consensus states the series "an expansive—if not always deep—history of the genre as seen through Ken Burns' expert eye, Country Music works as both a crash course for new listeners and a refresher for old-timers."

David Cantwell of The New Yorker wrote, "What the documentary gets right overwhelms the caveats. Burns' chief takeaway from his immersion in the genre is spot on: country music is not, and has never been, static." David Fear of Rolling Stone wrote, "Most of all, this epic, essential survey (which premieres on September 15th) is both a history lesson of an American art form and 20th century U.S.A. itself. Like Burns' 2001 deep dive Jazz, it puts the music's cultural and geographic roots front and center." Will Hermes of Rolling Stone wrote, "The most ambitious, culturally resonant music documentary ever made."

Jon Caramanica of The New York Times wrote, "Country Music makes it plain that the story of the genre is merely a pocket version of the story of the American musical experiment writ large: Everyone trying on poses and costumes, borrowing wildly at every turn, pointing fingers at others trying similar things, and, as soon as things become complacent, agitating for something new." Ken Tucker of NPR wrote, "In Country Music, Burns goes wide, not deep; it's rare for any musical excerpt to last more than 20 seconds, making it impossible for a singer to make an impression on a viewer unfamiliar with his or her work. This time around, Burns has traveled down Hank Williams' 'Lost Highway' with a busted GPS." Tim Goodman of The Hollywood Reporter wrote, "Country Music is a wide subject that Burns painstakingly brushes through. But there's not enough paint for that picture. You're going to see the canvas and the blotches. If you know that going in, it helps."

John Anderson of The Wall Street Journal wrote, "Ken Burns' eight-part, 16-hour series paints tells an expansive, inclusive story of the narrative-driven music." Caroline Framke of Variety wrote, "The new docuseries is reverent and exhaustive in its attempt to summarize almost a century of American music." Hank Stuever of The Washington Post wrote, "Burns delivers an enlightening, educational and often emotionally stirring account of country's essential evolution (still in progress), from traditional immigrant and church songs heard in the misty mountain hollers to a powerful, Nashville-centric industry that grew to favor predictable hits over authentic origins. I cried three times while making my way through it, moved by the music but also by the common thread of suffering that travels through those who create it."
