= Songwriters Hall of Fame =

Hall of fame and museum in Los Angeles, California, US

- Abbreviation: SHOF
- Formation: 1969
- Founder: Johnny Mercer; Abe Olman; Howie Richmond
- Type: Non-profit organization; Music organization
- Purpose: Honor songwriters; support and develop songwriting talent
- Headquarters: 25 Madison Avenue; New York, NY 10010; U.S.
- Region served: Worldwide
- President and CEO: Linda Moran
- Website: songhall.org

The Songwriters Hall of Fame (SHOF) is an internationally focused institution founded in 1969 by songwriter Johnny Mercer, music publisher/songwriter Abe Olman, and publisher/executive Howie Richmond to honor those whose work preserves and advances the heritage of English-language popular music. The non-profit organization is headquartered in Midtown Manhattan, New York City. In addition to celebrating renowned songwriters, the institution supports the development of new songwriting talent through workshops, showcases, and scholarships. Nile Rodgers, since 2018, has been Chairman.

== History ==
=== Founding and early years (1969–1990s) ===
The Hall of Fame was established in 1969 by Mercer, Olman, and Richmond. During its early decades, the organization focused primarily on recognizing influential songwriters and songwriting teams across popular music genres.

=== Exhibits and public presence ===
An exhibit dedicated to the SHOF was launched in 2010 at the Grammy Museum at L.A. Live in Los Angeles, California. The Hall has no permanent physical edifice, and because its annual awards ceremonies are not televised, there is no other publicly accessible recording of the events for posterity.

=== Inductees ===
Numerous collaborating songwriters have been inducted together, with each member considered a separate entrant. The inaugural class in 1969 included 120 inductees, including several professional partnerships such as Rodgers and Hammerstein. Later inductees have included songwriting teams such as Burt Bacharach and Hal David (1972), Betty Comden and Adolph Green (1980), and Leiber and Stoller (1985). Individual inductees have included John Lennon and Paul McCartney (1987), members of Holland-Dozier-Holland (1988), Elton John and Bernie Taupin (1992), and all three members of the Bee Gees (1994). John Denver was inducted in 1996. Queen became the first rock band to have all its members inducted in 2003. Five members of Earth, Wind & Fire were honored in 2010, and four members of Kool and the Gang were inducted in 2018. Through 2019, 461 individuals had been inducted.

=== Recent events (2000s–present) ===
Due to the COVID-19 pandemic, the 2020 Songwriters Hall of Fame induction ceremony was postponed until 2022. SHOF president and CEO Linda Moran stated that the postponement was made to allow the event to take place with proper celebration. The 2020 class includes Mariah Carey, Chad Hugo, the Isley Brothers, Annie Lennox, Steve Miller, Rick Nowels, William "Mickey" Stevenson, Dave Stewart, and Pharrell Williams. Awards for that year will honor Jody Gerson (Abe Olman Publisher Award) and Paul Williams (Johnny Mercer Award). On March 8, 2022, the ceremony was officially announced for June 16, 2022, at the Marriott Marquis in New York’s Times Square.

== Special Awards ==
=== Abe Olman Publisher Award ===
The Abe Olman Publisher Award is given to publishers who have had a substantial number of songs that have become world-renowned and who have helped to further the careers and success of many songwriters.

- 1983 – Howard S. Richmond
- 1986 – Leonard Feist
- 1987 – Lou Levy
- 1988 – Buddy Killen
- 1990 – Charles Koppelman & Martin Bandier
- 1991 – Frank Military & Jay Morgenstern
- 1992 – Bonnie Bourne
- 1993 – Berry Gordy
- 1994 – Buddy Morris
- 1995 – Al Gallico
- 1996 – Freddy Bienstock
- 1997 – Gene Goodman
- 1998 – Irwin Z. Robinson
- 1999 – Bill Lowery
- 2000 – Julian Aberbach
- 2001 – Ralph Peer
- 2002 – Edward P. Murphy
- 2003 – Nicholas Firth
- 2004 – Les Bider
- 2005 – Beebe Bourne
- 2006 – Allen Klein
- 2007 – Don Kirshner
- 2008 – Milt Okun
- 2009 – Maxyne Lang
- 2010 – Keith Mardak
- 2012 – Lance Freed
- 2015 – Linda Perry
- 2017 – Caroline Bienstock
- 2022 – Jody Gerson

=== Board of Directors Award ===
The Board of Directors Award is presented to an individual selected by the SHOF Board in recognition of his or her service to the songwriting community and the advancement of popular music.

- 1986 – Jule Styne
- 1988 – Stanley Adams
- 1992 – Edward P. Murphy
- 1996 – Anna Sosenko & Oscar Brand
- 1997 – Thomas A. Dorsey

=== Contemporary Icon Award ===
The Contemporary Icon Award was established in 2015 to "celebrate a songwriter-artist who has attained an iconic status in pop culture".

- 2015 – Lady Gaga
- 2019 – Justin Timberlake

=== Global Ambassador Award ===
In 2017, Pitbull was presented the Global Ambassador Award. The award is given to a person "whose music has true worldwide appeal, crossing genre, cultural and national boundaries".

=== Hal David Starlight Award ===
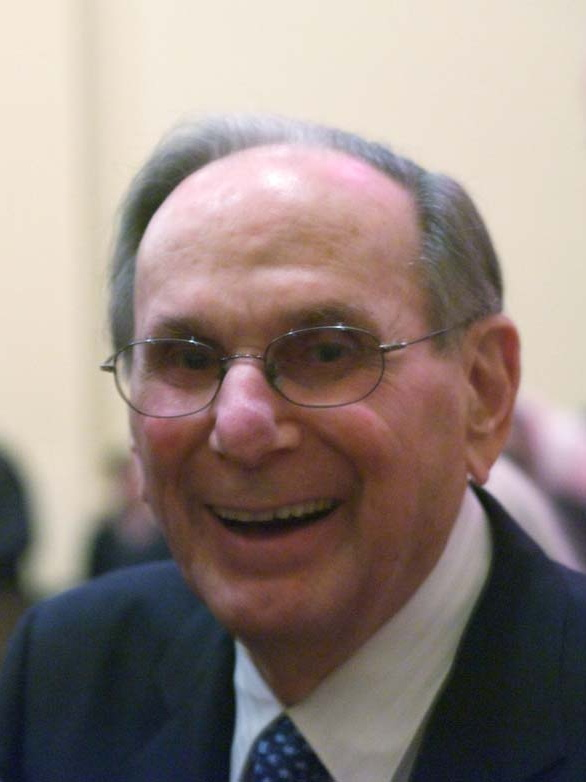
Hal David at the ASCAP Awards in 2011

First presented in 2004 as the Starlight Award, the prize was renamed in 2006 as the Hal David Starlight Award to honor the former SHOF chairman's support of young songwriters. Award recipients are "gifted songwriters who are at an apex in their careers and are making a significant impact in the music industry via their original songs".

- 2004 – Rob Thomas (Matchbox Twenty)
- 2005 – Alicia Keys
- 2006 – John Mayer
- 2007 – John Legend
- 2008 – John Rzeznik (Goo Goo Dolls)
- 2009 – Jason Mraz
- 2010 – Taylor Swift
- 2011 – Drake
- 2012 – Ne-Yo
- 2013 – Benny Blanco
- 2014 – Dan Reynolds (Imagine Dragons)
- 2015 – Nate Ruess (Fun)
- 2016 – Nick Jonas
- 2017 – Ed Sheeran
- 2018 – Sara Bareilles
- 2019 – Halsey
- 2022 – Lil Nas X
- 2023 – Post Malone
- 2024 – SZA
- 2025 – Gracie Abrams
- 2026 – RAYE

=== Howie Richmond Hitmaker Award ===
The Howie Richmond Hitmaker Award is given to musical artists who have had a substantial number of hit songs across a lengthy career, and who, according to the Hall of Fame, "recognize the importance of songs and their writers".

- 1981 – Chuck Berry
- 1983 – Rosemary Clooney & Margaret Whiting
- 1990 – Whitney Houston
- 1991 – Barry Manilow
- 1995 – Michael Bolton
- 1996 – Gloria Estefan
- 1998 – Diana Ross
- 1999 – Natalie Cole
- 2000 – Johnny Mathis
- 2001 – Dionne Warwick
- 2002 – Garth Brooks
- 2003 – Clive Davis
- 2008 – Anne Murray
- 2010 – Phil Ramone
- 2011 – Chaka Khan
- 2014 – Doug Morris
- 2016 – Seymour Stein
- 2018 – Lucian Grainge

=== Johnny Mercer Award ===
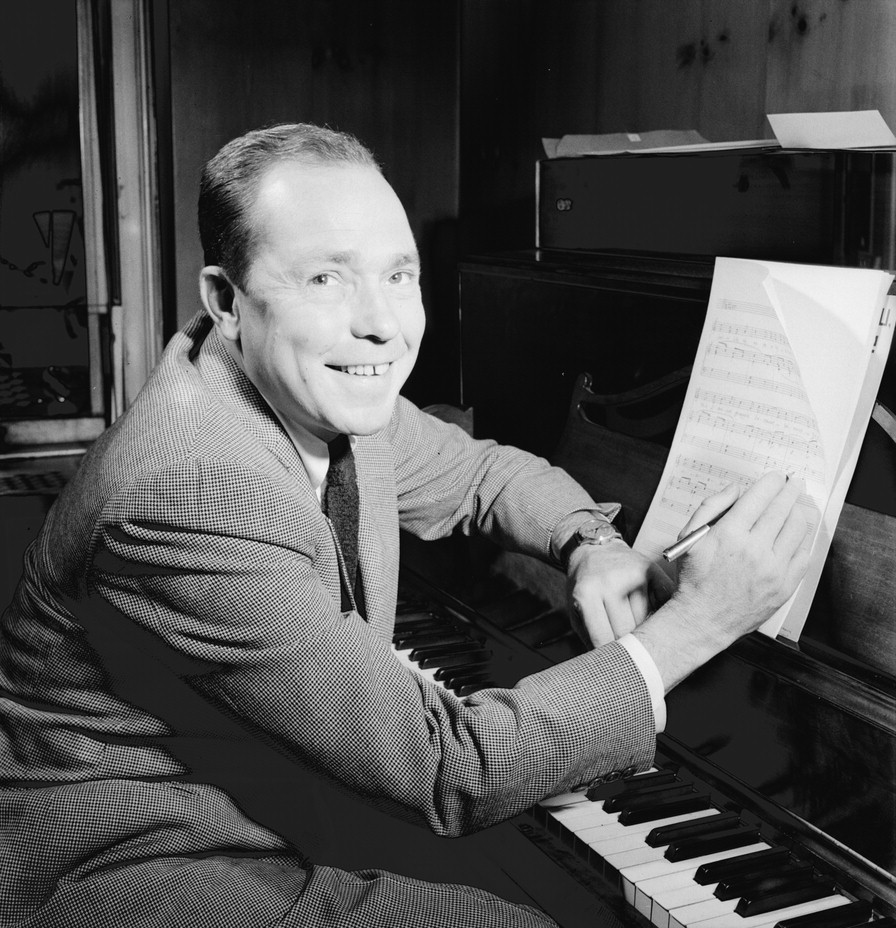
Johnny Mercer between 1946 and 1948

The Johnny Mercer Award is the highest honor bestowed by the event. It goes to writers already inducted into the Songwriters Hall of Fame for having established a history of outstanding creative works.

- 1980 – Frank Sinatra
- 1981 – Yip Harburg
- 1982 – Harold Arlen
- 1983 – Sammy Cahn
- 1985 – Alan Jay Lerner
- 1986 – Mitchell Parish
- 1987 – Jerry Herman
- 1990 – Jerry Bock & Sheldon Harnick
- 1991 – Betty Comden & Adolph Green
- 1992 – Burton Lane
- 1993 – Jule Styne
- 1994 – Irving Caesar
- 1995 – Cy Coleman
- 1996 – Burt Bacharach & Hal David
- 1997 – Alan and Marilyn Bergman
- 1998 – Paul Simon
- 1999 – Stephen Sondheim
- 2000 – Jerry Leiber and Mike Stoller
- 2001 – Billy Joel
- 2002 – Carole King
- 2003 – Jimmy Webb
- 2004 – Stevie Wonder
- 2005 – Smokey Robinson
- 2006 – Kris Kristofferson
- 2007 – Dolly Parton
- 2008 – Paul Anka
- 2009 – Holland–Dozier–Holland
- 2010 – Phil Collins
- 2011 – Barry Mann & Cynthia Weil
- 2013 – Elton John & Bernie Taupin
- 2014 – Kenneth Gamble & Leon Huff
- 2015 – Van Morrison
- 2016 – Lionel Richie
- 2017 – Alan Menken
- 2018 – Neil Diamond
- 2019 – Carole Bayer Sager
- 2022 – Paul Williams
- 2023 – Tim Rice
- 2024 – Diane Warren
- 2025 - Stephen Schwartz
- 2026 - John Fogerty

=== Patron of the Arts ===
The Patron of the Arts is presented to influential industry executives who are not primarily in the music business but are great supporters of the performing arts.

- 1988 – Martin Segal
- 1989 – Roger Enrico
- 1990 – Edgar Bronfman Jr.
- 1991 – Edwin M. Cooperman
- 1992 – Jonathan Tisch
- 1993 – Michel Roux
- 1994 – Philip Dusenberry
- 1995 – Theodore J. Forstmann
- 1996 – Sumner Redstone
- 1997 – Dr. Samuel LeFrak
- 1998 – David Checketts
- 1999 – Robert Mondavi
- 2001 – Iris Cantor
- 2002 – Stephen Swid
- 2003 – Martin Bandier
- 2004 – Michael Goldstein
- 2005 – Henry Juszkiewicz
- 2023 – Anthony Mason

=== Pioneer Award ===
The Pioneer Award was established in 2012 to recognize the career of a historic creator of an extensive body of musical work that has been a major influence on generations of songwriters.

- 2012 – Woody Guthrie
- 2013 – Berry Gordy

=== Sammy Cahn Lifetime Achievement Award ===
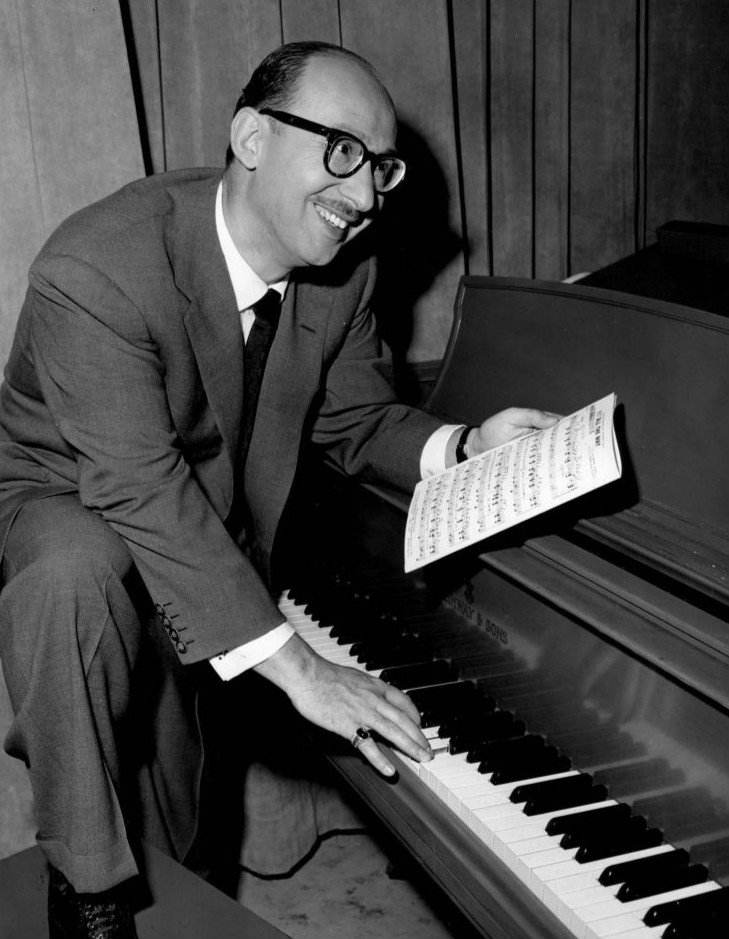
Sammy Cahn in 1950s

Named for the former President of the Songwriters Hall of Fame, the Sammy Cahn Lifetime Achievement Award is given to individuals or teams who are recognized as having done a great deal to further the successes of songwriters.

- 1980 – Ethel Merman
- 1981 – Tony Bennett
- 1982 – Dinah Shore
- 1983 – Willie Nelson
- 1984 – Benny Goodman
- 1985 – John Hammond
- 1987 – Jerry Wexler
- 1988 – Dick Clark
- 1989 – Quincy Jones
- 1990 – B. B. King
- 1991 – Gene Autry
- 1992 – Nat King Cole
- 1993 – Ray Charles
- 1994 – Lena Horne
- 1995 – Steve Lawrence & Eydie Gormé
- 1996 – Frankie Laine
- 1997 – Vic Damone
- 1998 – Berry Gordy
- 1999 – Kenny Rogers
- 2000 – Neil Diamond
- 2001 – Gloria & Emilio Estefan
- 2002 – Stevie Wonder
- 2003 – Patti LaBelle
- 2004 – Neil Sedaka
- 2005 – Les Paul
- 2006 – Peter, Paul & Mary
- 2009 – Tom Jones
- 2012 – Bette Midler

=== Towering Performance Award ===
The Towering Performance Award is given in recognition of one-of-a-kind performances by one-of-a-kind singers that have recorded outstanding and unforgettable interpretations of songs that have become iconic standards.

- 2003 – Tony Bennett
- 2005 – Bill Medley
- 2009 – Andy Williams
- 2012 – Ben E. King

=== Towering Song Award ===
The Towering Song Award is given to creators of an individual song that has influenced the culture in a unique way over the years.

- 1995 – "As Time Goes By" (written by Herman Hupfeld)
- 1996 – "Happy Birthday To You" (written by Patty Hill and Mildred J. Hill)
- 1997 – "How High The Moon" (lyrics by Nancy Hamilton and music by Morgan Lewis)
- 1998 – "The Christmas Song" (written by Robert Wells and Mel Tormé)
- 1999 – "Fly Me To The Moon" (written by Bart Howard)
- 2000 – "All of Me" (written by Gerald Marks and Seymour Simons)
- 2000 – "You Are My Sunshine" (recorded by Jimmie Davis)
- 2001 – "Let Me Call You Sweetheart" (lyrics by Beth Slater Whitson and music by Leo Friedman)
- 2002 – "You're a Grand Old Flag" (written by George M. Cohan)
- 2003 – "I Left My Heart in San Francisco" (written by George Cory and Douglass Cross)
- 2004 – "What the World Needs Now is Love" (lyrics by Hal David and music by Burt Bacharach)
- 2005 – "You've Lost That Lovin' Feelin'" (written by Phil Spector, Barry Mann and Cynthia Weil)
- 2006 – "When the Saints Go Marching In" (lyrics by Katharine Purvis and music by James Milton Black)
- 2007 – "Unchained Melody" (lyrics by Hy Zaret and music by Alex North)
- 2008 – "Take Me Out to the Ball Game" (lyrics by Jack Norworth and music by Albert Von Tilzer)
- 2009 – "Moon River" (lyrics by Johnny Mercer and music by Henry Mancini)
- 2010 – "Bridge Over Troubled Water" (written by Paul Simon)
- 2011 – "It Was a Very Good Year" (written by Ervin Drake)
- 2012 – "Stand by Me" (written by Ben E. King, Jerry Leiber and Mike Stoller)
- 2013 – "A Change Is Gonna Come" (written by Sam Cooke)
- 2014 – "Over The Rainbow" (lyrics by E.Y. Harburg and music by Harold Arlen)
- 2015 – "What a Wonderful World" (written by Bob Thiele and George David Weiss)

=== Visionary Leadership Award ===
Created in 2011, The Visionary Leadership Award recognizes members of the Hall of Fame Board of Directors who have made a significant contribution in furthering the ongoing mission of the organization.

- 2011 – Hal David
- 2014 – Del Bryant
- 2015 – John A. Lofrumento
- 2019 – Martin Bandier

== Scholarship awards ==
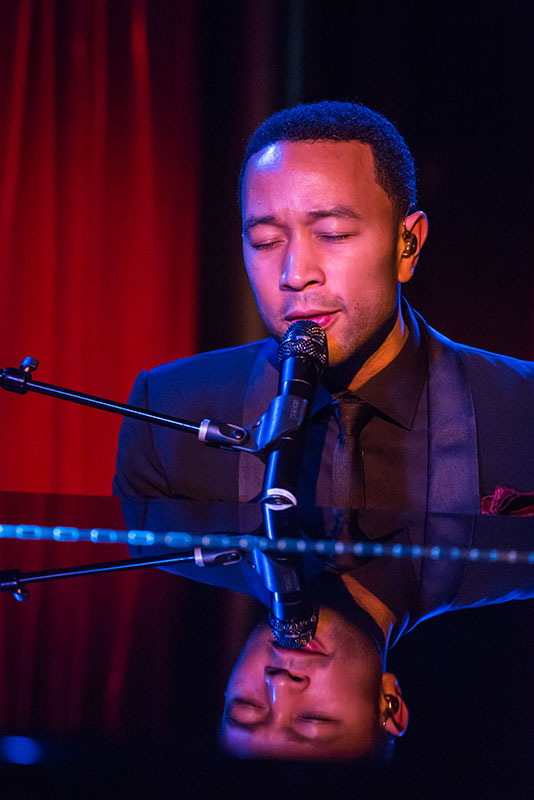
John Legend was honored in 2002 with the Abe Olman Scholarship.

=== Abe Olman Scholarship ===
Abe Olman was an American songwriter and music publisher. He was later director of ASCAP, and a founder of the Songwriters Hall of Fame which, in 1983, named the Abe Olman Publisher Award. In his honor, the Abe Olman Scholarship is given out each year by his family in the interest of encouraging and supporting the careers of young songwriters. The scholarship has been awarded since 1989 to individuals such as:

- 2002 – John Legend
- 2005 – Matt Katz-Bohen
- 2012 – Bebe Rexha

=== Holly Prize ===
Created in 2010, the Holly Prize is a tribute to the legacy of Buddy Holly, a SHOF inductee. The award recognizes and supports a new "all-in songwriter" — an exceptionally talented and inspired young musician/singer/songwriter whose work exhibits the qualities of Holly's music: true, great and original. The Holly Prize is administered and juried by the SongHall.

- 2010 – Laura Warshauer
- 2011 – Kendra Morris
- 2012 – Emily King
- 2013 – Ben Howard
- 2014 – Jack Skuller
- 2015 – Jenny O.
- 2016 – Shun Ng
- 2017 – Katie Pruitt
- 2018 – Sylvan Esso
- 2019 – Adia Victoria

=== NYU Steinhardt Songwriting Scholar Award ===
Announced in 2011, along with a collaboration between the Songwriters Hall of Fame and NYU Steinhardt's Department of Music and Performing Arts Professions, the NYU Steinhardt Songwriting Scholar Award is presented to a music composition student whose work holds great potential for success in the field, and embodies the art, craft, individuality and qualities of communication of the best songwriting.

== See also ==
- Nashville Songwriters Hall of Fame
- List of music museums
- Women Songwriters Hall of Fame
- Latin Songwriters Hall of Fame
- Nashville Songwriters Foundation
- Australian Songwriters Hall of Fame
- Canadian Songwriters Hall of Fame

== Bibliography ==
=== Secondary references ===
- American Songwriter; Dye, Robert (June 15, 2012). "Highlights From the 2012 Songwriters Hall of Fame Awards". Archived from the original on March 5, 2016.
- Billboard. ISSN 0006-2510.
1. Christman, Ed (March 10, 2011). "Barry Mann and Cynthia Weil to Receive Johnny Mercer Award at 2011 Songwriters Hall of Fame Event". Archived from the original on July 24, 2021.
2. Graff, Gary. "Nile Rodgers Appointed Chairman of the Songwriters Hall of Fame: Exclusive". Archived from the original on July 2, 2018.
3. Billboard staff (March 31, 2020). Songwriters Hall of Fame Postpones Next Induction Until 2021. Archived from the original on May 31, 2020.
4. Grein, Paul (March 8, 2022). "Songwriters Hall of Fame Reveals Date of 2022 Induction & Awards Gala: Exclusive". Archived from the original on March 29, 2022.
- Einstein Factor (The). Special Subject: "The Lives & Music of Queen" (Season 4, episode 20: aired Sunday, June 24, 2007). Peter Berner, host. Australian Broadcasting Corporation. Archived from the original on October 16, 2007.
1. Contestants:
  1. Daniel Ayres. Special Subject: The Lives & Music of Queen.
  2. John Oakley. Special Subject: The Life & Times of Ernest Shackleton.
  3. Shane Gardiner. Special Subject: The Life & Films of Charlie Chaplin.
The Einstein Factor was a TV quiz show that aired weekly (Sundays) on the Australian Broadcasting Corporation (ABC) and ABC2 – from 8 February 2004 to 22 November 2009. It pitted contestants with deep knowledge in a specific, often niche, subject against a "Brains Trust" of experts.
- Hollywood Reporter (The); Trakin, Roy (April 28, 2014). "BMI Head Del Bryant to Be Presented with Visionary Leadership Award at Songwriters Hall of Fame". Archived from the original on July 2, 2015. ISSN 0018-3660; OCLC 44653726 (all editions).
- Mercer Foundation (Johnny). "The Johnny Mercer Award Winners". Archived from the original on June 30, 2015.
- New York Times (The). LCCN sn00-61556; ISSN 0362-4331, ISSN 1553-8095 (online).
1. Obituaries: "Leonard Feist, Music Executive, 85" (AP). Vol. 146, no. 50617 (Late City ed.). November 20, 1996. p. 21 (section D; column 1, bottom). ProQuest 430698751 (print ed.), ProQuest 2237469271 (blog ed.) (US Newsstream database)
  1. Via NYTimes blog.
  2. Via TimesMachine (digital image 93).
  3. Permalink via TimesMachine (digital image 93).
- Rachlin, Harvey (1981). The Encyclopedia of the Music Business. New York: Harper & Row. LCCN 81-47235; ISBN 978-0-0601-4913-0, 0-0601-4913-2; OCLC 7307690 (all editions).
1. "Songwriters' Hall of Fame Museum". p. 402–403 – via Internet Archive Kahle/Austin Foundation (Belmont University).
- Rolling Stone (blog ed.) (March 12, 2013). "Berry Gordy to Receive Pioneer Award From Songwriters Hall of Fame". Archived from the original on July 3, 2015.
- Variety (weekly) – via Internet Archive (Media History Digital Library). Retrieved April 26, 2021. LCCN 76-646510; ISSN 0042-2738; OCLC 5250629 (all editions).
1. Barker, Andrew (June 18, 2015). "Songwriters Hall of Fame Honorees Range from Gaga to Grateful Dead". Archived from the original on June 19, 2015.
2. Aswad, Jem (March 31, 2020). "Songwriters Hall of Fame Induction Ceremony Moved to 2021". Archived from the original on May 31, 2020.
3. Aswad, Jem (March 8, 2022). "Songwriters Hall of Fame Confirms 2022 Date: Mariah Carey, Pharrell, Eurythmics Among Honorees". Archived from the original on March 8, 2022.

=== Primary references ===
- Songwriters' Hall of Fame.
About the Songwriters' Hall of Fame
1. "About Us". Archived from the original on February 1, 2023.
Songwriters' Hall of Fame Inductees
1. Bio: "John Lennon". 1987. Archived from the original on September 9, 2025.
2. Bio: "Sir Paul McCartney". 1987. Archived from the original on December 4, 2025.
Abe Olman Publisher Award for Lifetime Achievement
1. About: "Abe Olman Publisher Award". Archived from the original on March 29, 2017.
2. Bio: "Leonard Feist". 1986. Archived from the original on December 4, 2025.
3. Bio: "Don Kirshner". 2007. Archived from the original on October 18, 2021.
Board of Directors Award
1. About: "Board of Directors Award". Archived from the original on March 30, 2017.
Contemporary Icon Award
1. About: "Contemporary Icon Award". Archived from the original on September 25, 2020.
2. Bio: "Lady Gaga". April 23, 2015. Archived from the original on April 4, 2020.
3. Bio: "Justin Timberlake". May 8, 2019. Archived from the original on September 25, 2020.
Global Ambassador Award
1. About: "Global Ambassador Award". Archived from the original on October 24, 2021.
2. Bio: "Armando Christian Pérez pka 'Pitbull'" ("pka" = "professionally known as"). 2017. Archived from the original on October 24, 2021.
Hal David Starlight Award
1. About: "Hal David Starlight Award". March 7, 2016. Archived from the original on August 13, 2019.
2. "John Legend to Receive Hal David Starlight Award at Songwriters Hall of Fame Gala". April 30, 2007. Archived from the original on August 27, 2019.
Howie Richmond Hitmaker Award
1. About: "Howie Richmond Hitmaker Award". Archived from the original on May 18, 2008.
Johnny Mercer Award
1. About: "Johnny Mercer Award". Archived from the original on June 23, 2015.
Patron of the Arts
1. About: "Patron of the Arts". Archived from the original on March 29, 2017.
Sammy Cahn Lifetime Achievement Award
1. Sammy Cahn Lifetime Achievement Award.
Towering Performance
1. About: "Towering Performance". Archived from the original on March 29, 2017.
Towering Song
1. About: "Towering Songs". Archived from the original on March 29, 2017.
2. "'I Left My Heart in San Francisco'". 2003. Archived from the original on October 16, 2021.
Best of Songwriting Legends
1. "Songwriters Hall of Fame Celebrates the Best of Songwriting Legends". June 14, 2013. Archived from the original on June 24, 2013.
2. "Songwriters Hall of Fame Celebrates the Best of Songwriting Legends". June 13, 2014. Archived from the original on November 5, 2014.
Visionary Leadership Award
1. "ASCAP CEO John A. Lofrumento to Be Honored with Visionary Leadership Award". May 7, 2015. Archived from the original on May 19, 2015.
Abe Olman Scholarship
1. About: "Abe Olman Scholarship". Archived from the original on October 25, 2016.
NYU Steinhardt Songwriting Scholar Award
1. About: "NYU Steinhardt Songwriting Scholar Award". Archived from the original on July 1, 2015.
The Holly Prize
1. About: "The Holly Prize". Archived from the original on April 10, 2019.
Annual Awards Gala press releases
1. "1980 Award and Induction Ceremony". Archived from the original on October 24, 2021.
2. "2003 Induction and Awards Gala: John Deacon, Brian May, Freddie Mercury, Roger Taylor" (Queen). June 12, 2003. Archived from the original on December 17, 2010.
3. "2006 Award and Induction Ceremony". March 7, 2016. Archived from the original on August 27, 2019.
4. "Songwriters Hall of Fame Reschedules 51st Annual Induction and Awards Gala". February 10, 2021. Archived from the original on December 4, 2025.
