= LP record =

Vinyl analog sound storage discs

LP

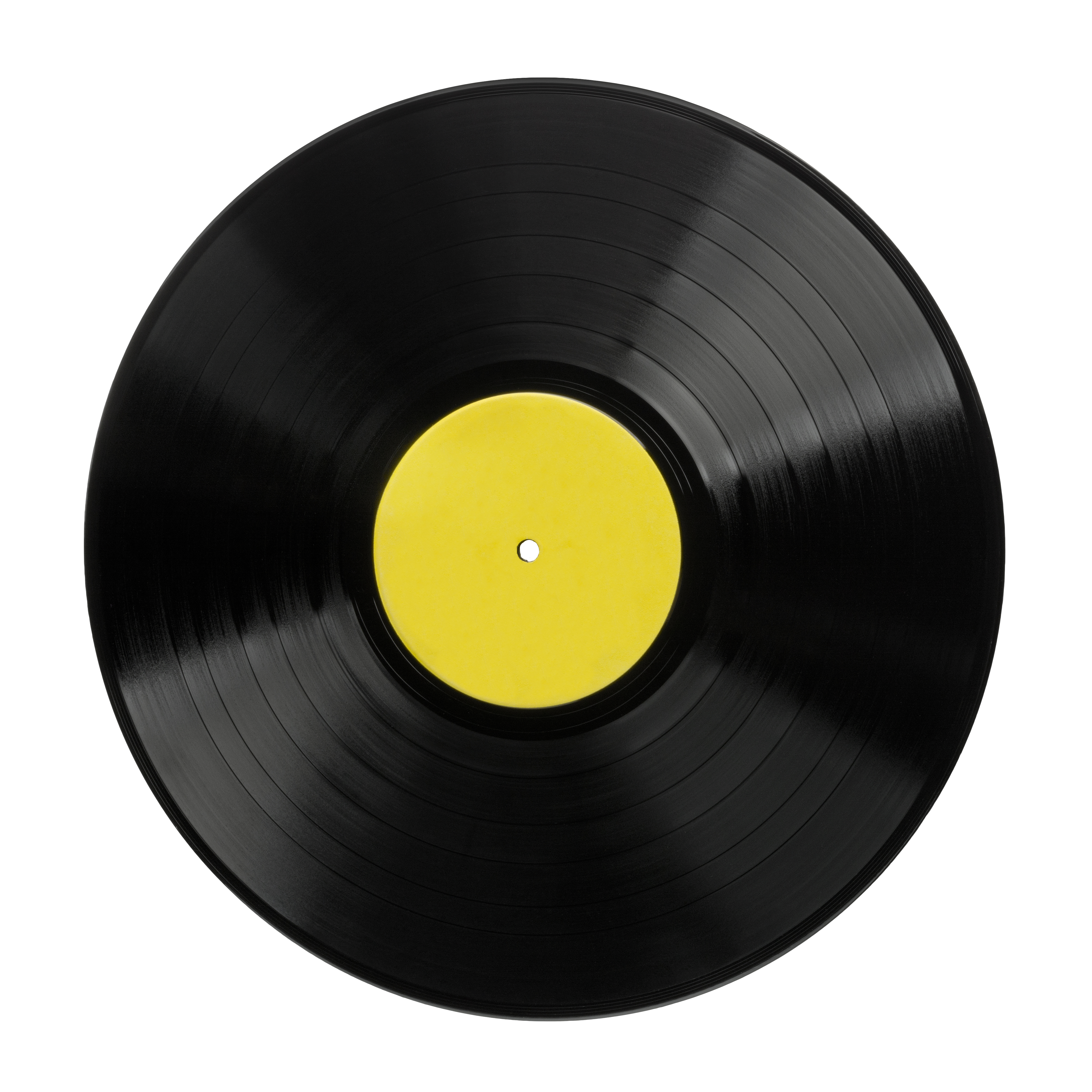
- A 12-inch LP vinyl record Top: the original LP logo as used by Columbia Records
- Media type: Audio playback
- Encoding: Analog groove modulation
- Capacity: Originally 23 minutes per side, later increased by several minutes, much longer possible with very low signal level
- Read mechanism: Microgroove stylus (maximum tip radius 0.001 in or 25 μm)
- Developed by: Columbia Records
- Dimensions: 12 inches (30 cm), 10 inches (25 cm), 90–240 g (3.2–8.5 oz)
- Usage: Audio storage
- Released: 1948; 78 years ago

The LP (from long playing or long play) is an analog sound storage medium, specifically a phonograph record format characterized by a speed of 33 1/3 rpm, a 12- or 10-inch (30- or 25-cm) diameter, use of the "microgroove" groove specification, and a black vinyl (a copolymer of vinyl chloride acetate) composition disk. Introduced by Columbia Records in 1948, it was soon adopted as a new standard by the entire US record industry and, apart from a few relatively minor refinements and the important later addition of stereophonic sound in 1957, it remained the standard format for record albums during a period in popular music known as the "album era". LP was originally a trademark of Columbia and competed against the smaller 7-inch sized "45" or "single" format by RCA Victor, eventually ending up on top. Today in the vinyl revival era, a large majority of records are based on the LP format, and hence the LP name continues to be in use today to refer to new records.

== Format advantages ==
At the time the LP was introduced, nearly all phonograph records for home use were made of an abrasive (and therefore noisy) shellac compound, employed a much larger groove, and played at approximately 78 revolutions per minute (rpm), limiting the playing time of a 12-inch diameter record to less than five minutes per side. The new product was a 12- or 10-inch (30 or 25 cm) fine-grooved disc made of PVC ("vinyl") and played with a smaller-tipped "microgroove" stylus at a speed of 33 1/3 rpm. Each side of a 12-inch LP could play for about 25 minutes, allowing for a total runtime of approximately 50 minutes.

== History ==
Despite some earlier experiments and attempts at commercial marketing, the Long Play format did not begin to enjoy commercial popularity until the early 1950s.

=== Predecessors ===
Starting in 1926, the Edison Records company experimented with issuing Edison Disc Records in long play format of 24 minutes per side. The system and playback system (still mostly wind-up phonographs) proved unreliable and was a commercial failure.

==== Soundtrack discs ====
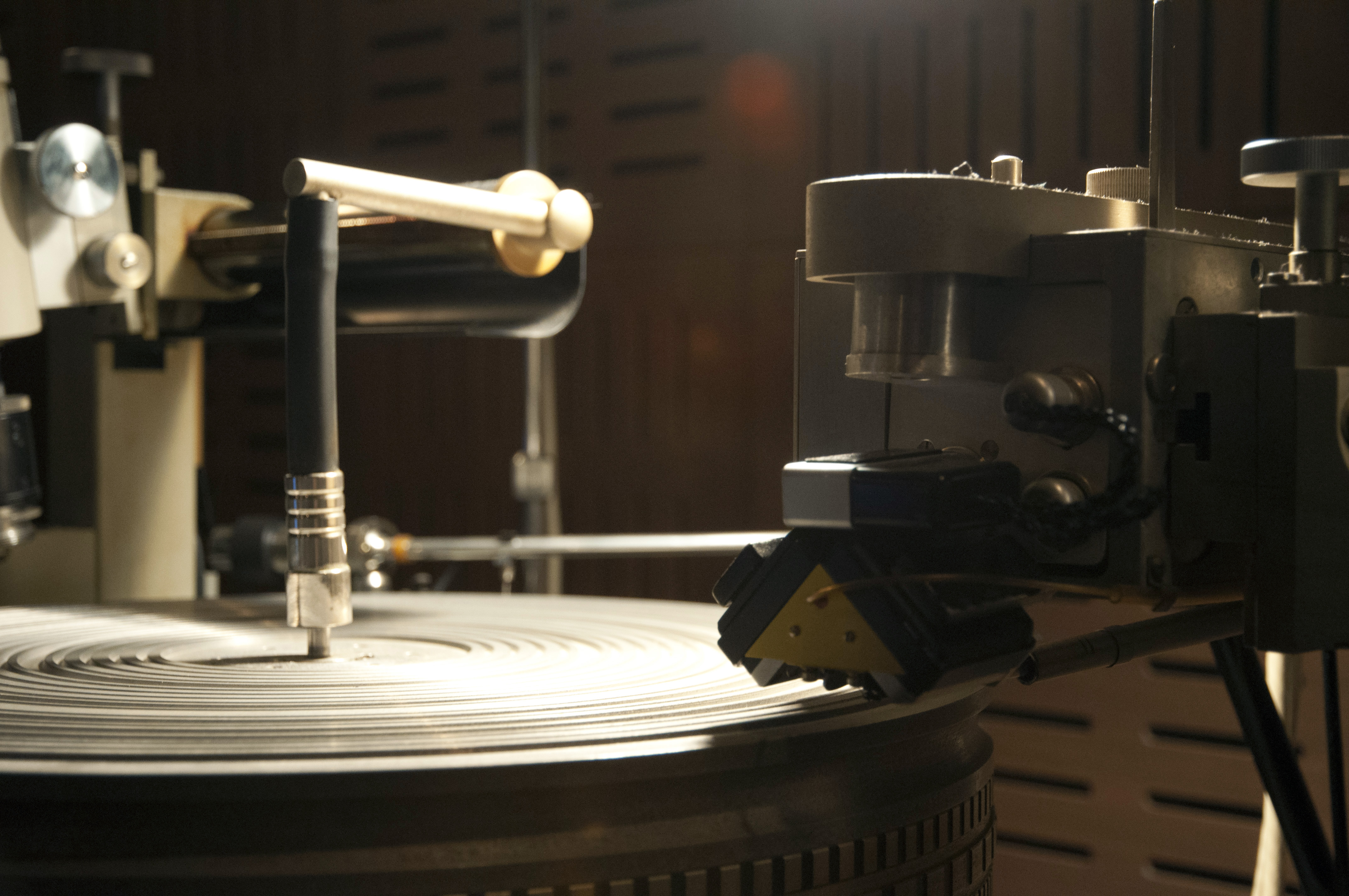
Neumann lathe with SX-74 cutting head

By mid-1931 all motion picture studios were recording on optical soundtracks, but sets of soundtrack discs, mastered by dubbing from the optical tracks and scaled down to 12 inches to cut costs, were made as late as 1936 for distribution to theaters still equipped with disc-only sound projectors.

==== RCA Victor ====
In September 1931, RCA Victor launched the first commercially available vinyl long-playing record, marketed as "Program-Transcription" records. These revolutionary discs were designed for playback at 33 1/3 rpm and were pressed on 30-cm diameter flexible plastic discs, with a duration of about ten minutes playing time per side. Victor's early introduction of a long-playing record was a commercial failure for several reasons, including the lack of affordable consumer playback equipment and consumer rejection during the Great Depression. Although RCA Victor had deleted most of their Program-Transcription records within a few years, some titles remained in the catalog until the end of the decade. Development on an improved long-playing record continued at RCA during the 1930s, but was suspended with the outbreak of World War II.

These "Program Transcription" discs, as RCA Victor called them, played at 33 1/3 rpm and used a somewhat finer and more closely spaced groove than typical 78-rpm records. They were to be played with a special RCA "Chromium Orange" chrome-plated steel needle. The 10-inch discs, mostly used for popular and light classical music, were normally pressed in shellac, but the 12-inch discs, mostly used for "serious" classical music, were pressed in Victor's new vinyl-based "Victrolac" compound, which provided a much quieter playing surface. These records could hold up to 15 minutes per side. Beethoven's Fifth Symphony, performed by the Philadelphia Orchestra under Leopold Stokowski, was the first 12-inch recording issued. Compton Pakensham, reviewing the event in The New York Times, wrote, "What we were not prepared for was the quality of reproduction ... incomparably fuller."

=== Development of the LP ===
CBS Laboratories head research scientist Peter Goldmark led Columbia's team to develop a phonograph record that would hold at least 20 minutes per side. Although Goldmark was the chief scientist who selected the team, he delegated most of the experimental work to William S. Bachman, whom Goldmark had lured from General Electric, and Howard H. Scott.

Research began in 1939, was suspended during World War II, and resumed in 1945. Columbia Records unveiled the LP at a press conference in the Waldorf Astoria on June 21, 1948, in two formats: 10 inches (25 centimetres) in diameter, matching that of 78-rpm singles, and 12 inches (30 centimetres) in diameter. The initial release of 133 recordings were: 85 12-inch classical LPs (ML 4001 to 4085), 26 10-inch classics (ML 2001 to 2026), eighteen 10-inch popular numbers (CL 6001 to 6018), and four 10-inch juvenile records (JL 8001 to 8004). According to the 1949 Columbia catalog, issued September 1948, the first twelve-inch LP was Mendelssohn's Concerto in E Minor by Nathan Milstein on the violin with the New York Philharmonic, conducted by Bruno Walter (ML 4001). Three ten-inch series were released: "popular", starting with the reissue of The Voice of Frank Sinatra (CL 6001); "classical", numbering from Beethoven's 8th symphony (ML 2001), and "juvenile", commencing with Nursery Songs by Gene Kelly (JL 8001). Also released at this time were a pair of 2-LP sets: Puccini's La bohème (SL-1) and Humperdinck's Hansel and Gretel (SL-2). All 12-inch pressings were of 220 grams vinyl. Columbia may have planned for the Bach album ML 4002 to be the first, since the releases came in alphabetical order by composer (the first 54 LPS, ML 4002 through ML 4055, are in order from Bach to Tchaikovsky); Nathan Milstein was very popular in the 1940s, however, so his performance of the Mendelssohn concerto was moved to ML 4001.

=== Public reception ===
When the LP was introduced in 1948, the 78 was still the conventional format for phonograph records. By 1952, 78s still accounted for slightly more than half of the units sold in the United States and just under half of the dollar sales. The 45, oriented toward the single song, accounted for just over 30% of unit sales and just over 25% of dollar sales. The LP represented not quite 17% of unit sales and just over 26% of dollar sales.

Ten years after their introduction, the share of unit sales for LPs in the US was almost 25%, and of dollar sales, 58%. Most of the remainder was taken up by the 45; 78s accounted for only 2% of unit sales and 1% of dollar sales.

The popularity of the LP ushered in the "album era" of English-language popular music, beginning in the late 1950s, as performers took advantage of the longer playing time to create coherent themes or concept albums. "The rise of the LP as a form—as an artistic entity, as they used to say—has complicated how we perceive and remember what was once the most evanescent of the arts", Robert Christgau wrote in Christgau's Record Guide: Rock Albums of the Seventies (1981). "The album may prove a '70s totem—briefer configurations were making a comeback by decade's end. But for the '70s it will remain the basic musical unit, and that's OK with me. I've found over the years that the long-playing record, with its twenty-minute sides and four-to-six compositions/performances per side, suits my habits of concentration perfectly."

Although the popularity of LPs (as well as 45s) began to decline in the late 1970s with the advent of cassette tapes, and later in the 1980s with the advent of digital compact discs, the LP survives as a format to the present day. Vinyl LP records enjoyed a resurgence in popularity throughout the 2010s, and US vinyl sales in 2017 reached 15.6 million and 27 million for 2020. In 2022, US vinyl sales reached 41 million units, surpassing sales of the compact disc for the first time since 1987, once again making the LP the highest selling physical format there.

== Competing formats ==
Reel-to-reel magnetic tape recorders posed a new challenge to the LP in the 1950s, but the higher cost of pre-recorded tapes was one of several factors that confined tape to a niche market. 8-track cartridge and cassette tapes were more convenient and less expensive than reel-to-reel tapes, and they became popular for use in automobiles beginning in the mid-1960s. The LP was not seriously challenged as the primary medium for listening to recorded music at home until the 1970s, however, when the audio quality of the cassette was greatly improved by better tape formulations and noise-reduction systems. By 1983, cassettes were outselling LPs in the US.

The compact disc (CD) was introduced in 1982. It offered a recording that was, theoretically, almost noiseless and not audibly degraded by repeated playing or slight scuffs and scratches. At first, the much higher prices of CDs and CD players limited their target market to affluent early adopters and audiophiles; however, prices came down, and by 1988, CDs outsold LPs. The CD became the top-selling format, over cassettes, in 1992.

Along with phonograph records in other formats, some of which were made of other materials, LPs are now widely referred to simply as "vinyl". Since the late 1990s there has been a vinyl revival. Demand has increased in niche markets, particularly among audiophiles, DJs, and fans of indie music, but most music sales as of 2018 came from online downloads and online streaming because of their availability, convenience, and price.

== Playing time ==
With the advent of sound film or "talkies", the need for greater storage space made 33 1/3 rpm records more appealing. Soundtracks – played on records synchronized to movie projectors in theatres – could not fit onto the five minutes per side that 78s offered. When initially introduced, 12-inch LPs played for a maximum of about 23 minutes per side, 10-inch records for around 15. They were not an immediate success, however, as they were released during the height of the Great Depression, and seemed frivolous to the many impoverished of the time. It was not until "microgroove" was developed by Columbia Records in 1948 that Long Players (LPs) reached their maximum playtime, which has continued to modern times.

Economics and tastes initially determined which kind of music was available on each format. Recording company executives believed upscale classical music fans would be eager to hear a Beethoven symphony or a Mozart concerto without having to flip over multiple, four-minute-per-side 78s, and that pop music fans, who were used to listening to one song at a time, would find the shorter time of the 10-inch LP sufficient. As a result, the 12-inch format was reserved solely for higher-priced classical recordings and Broadway shows. Popular music continued to appear only on 10-inch records. However, by the mid-1950s, the 10-inch LP, like its similarly sized 78-rpm cousin, lost the format war and was discontinued.

== Groove ==
The close spacing of the spiral groove that allowed more playing time on a 33 1/3 rpm microgroove LP also allowed a faint pre-echo of upcoming loud sounds. The cutting stylus unavoidably transferred some of the subsequent groove's signal to the previous groove. It was discernible by some listeners throughout certain recordings, and a quiet passage followed by a loud sound would allow anyone to hear a faint pre-echo of the loud sound 1.8 seconds ahead of time.

== Further advances in LP ==
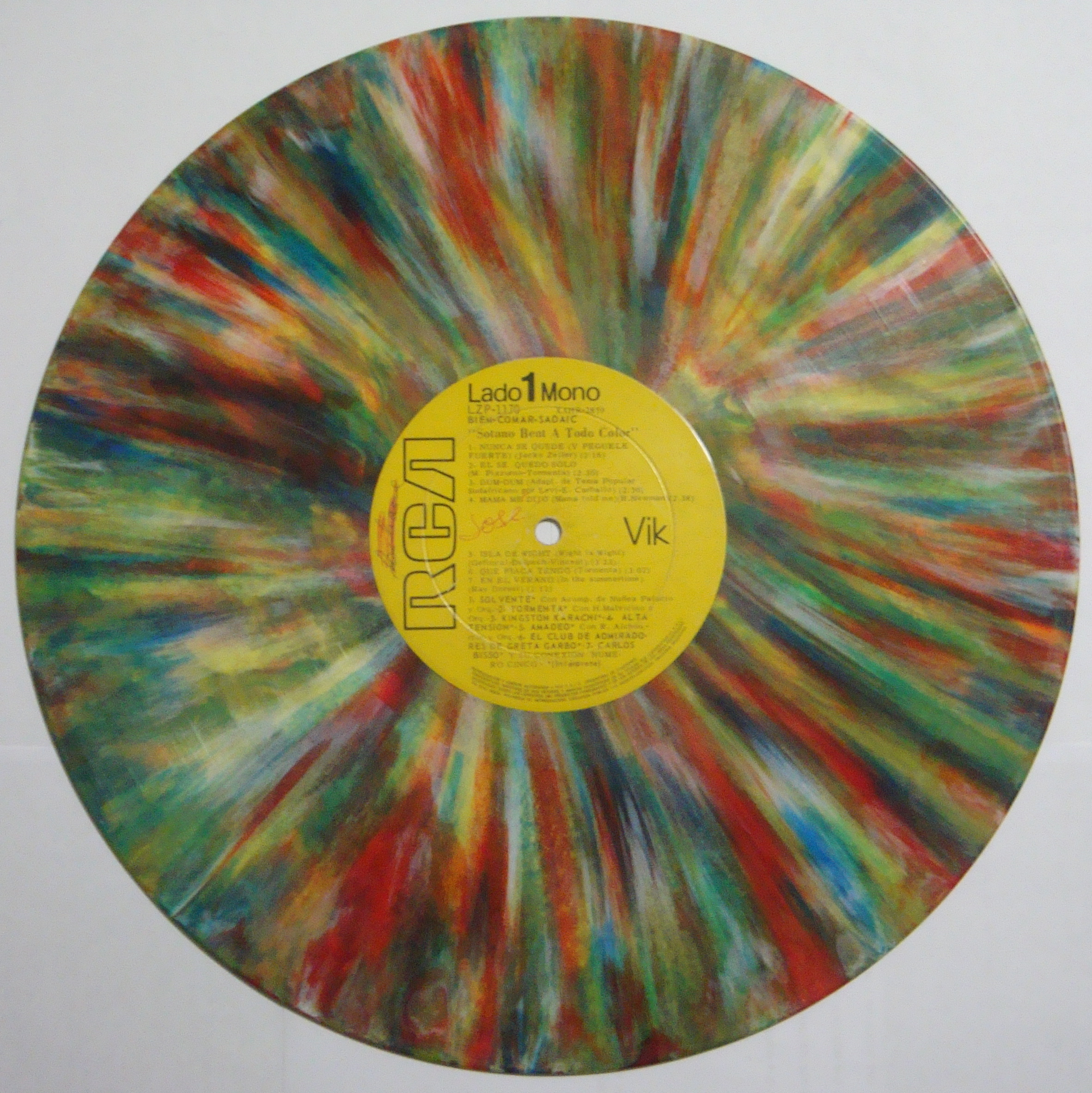
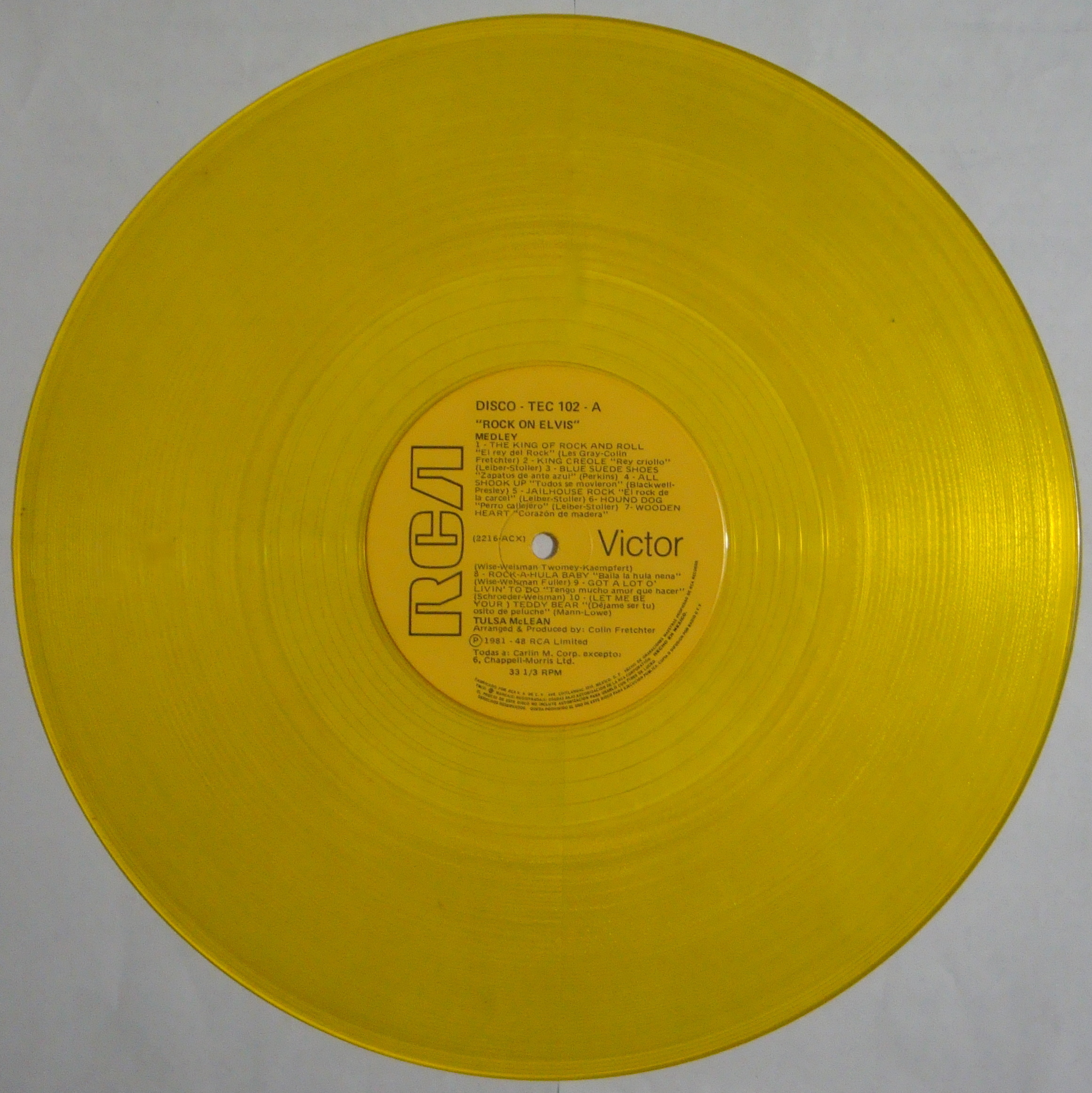
RCA LPs pressed in multicolored vinyl (Sótano Beat a Todo Color, a various-artists compilation) and clear yellow vinyl ("Rock On Elvis" by Tulsa McLean), both from Argentina

The following are some significant advances in the format:

- Helium-cooled cutting heads that could withstand higher levels of high frequencies (Neumann SX68); previously, the cutting engineer had to reduce the HF content of the signal sent to the record cutting head, otherwise the delicate coils could burn out
- Elliptical stylus marketed by several manufacturers at the end of the 1960s
- Cartridges that operate at lower tracking forces (2.0 grams / 20 mN), beginning from the mid-1960s
- Half-speed and one-third-speed record cutting, which extends the usable bandwidth of the record
- Longer-lasting, antistatic record compounds (e.g., RCA Dynaflex, Q-540)
- More advanced stylus tip shapes (Shibata, Van den Hul, MicroLine, etc.)
- Direct metal mastering
- Noise-reduction (CX encoding, dbx encoding), starting from 1973
- In the 1970s, quadraphonic sound (four-channel) records became available in both discrete and matrix formats. These did not achieve the popularity of stereo records due to the expense of consumer playback equipment, competing and incompatible quad recording standards, and a lack of quality in most quad-remix releases.

== See also ==
- Album cover
- Comparison of recording media
- Conservation and restoration of vinyl discs
- Extended play (EP)
- Independent record label
- Music industry
- Music recording sales certification
- Lists of record labels
