= Grammy Award for Best R&B Solo Vocal Performance, Male or Female =

Grammy Award

The Grammy Award for Best R&B Solo Vocal Performance - Male or Female was awarded at the Grammy Awards of 1967 for music released in the previous year. For this year only it replaced the awards for Best Female R&B Vocal Performance and Best Male R&B Vocal Performance. The award was won by Ray Charles for "Crying Time".

== Recipients ==
Year	Winner(s)	Title	Nominees	Ref.
1967	Ray Charles	"Crying Time"	James Brown for "It's a Man's Man's Man's World"; Lou Rawls for "Love Is a Hurtin' Thing"; Stevie Wonder for "Uptight (Everything's Alright)"; Percy Sledge for "When a Man Loves a Woman"	
