= Linda Moran =

American music executive

- Occupations: CEO/President of the Songwriters Hall of Fame, American music executive
- Years active: 1970–present

Linda Jasmin Moran is an American music executive. She is the CEO and President of the Songwriters Hall of Fame, appointed by Hal David in 2001. She was the first female executive at Warner Music Group and worked at Atlantic Records in previous years. Moran has been nicknamed the "godmother" to music's top executives and artists.

== Career ==
=== Atlantic Records ===
Linda Moran joined Atlantic Records in 1970 as Executive Assistant to Vice Chairman Sheldon Vogel. In 1983, she was promoted to Assistant Vice President of the label. Upon her promotion to Vice President of Atlantic Records in 1985, Vogel commented, “Linda has developed into an indispensable member of our executive team, bringing her considerable knowledge and experience to bear on every fact of corporate administration.” In 1989 she became a Senior VP at the label.

=== Warner Music Group ===
Moran was the first female executive at Warner Music Group, appointed in 1991 as VP/Group & External Relations. About her working years at Warner Music Group, upon honoring Moran with the Recording Academy's Hero Award, Time Warner CEO Jerry Levin commented, “I checked our records, and I see that Linda started working for our music group at Atlantic in 1970… And we’ve been working for her ever since.” While at Warner Music Group, Moran was concurrently secretary/treasurer at New York NARAS.

=== Songwriters Hall of Fame ===
In 2001, Linda was elected President of the Songwriters Hall of Fame. In a 2001 Billboard article Linda stated “But the problem is, as so many songwriters have told me, nobody knows your name. So I’m excited about taking the academy to the next level in getting songwriters their due.” She was also elected CEO of the Songwriters Hall of Fame in June 2011. Moran was quoted along with Kenneth Gamble and Leon Huff in the New York Times upon Jay Z becoming the first rapper to be inducted into the Songwriters Hall of Fame saying, "that with its new class, the organization "moves definitively into recognizing music creators of the 21st century while continuing to honor the greats of earlier decades." They added, “The songwriters we honor cross genre, regional and even national boundaries — R&B, rap, pop and rock ’n’ roll from both coasts, the American heartland and Sweden.”. The block of 125th Street in front of the Apollo is named ‘Nat King Cole Way,’ through Moran's efforts with the Mayor's office.

=== Recognition ===
Linda Moran was an honoree of the Heroes Award by the National Academy of Recording Arts and Sciences New York Chapter. At the ceremony, which included Time Warner CEO Gerald Levin and BMI president/CEO Frances Preston, Preston described her as a “Rolodex on speed.”

=== Personal life ===
Linda Moran is married to recording engineer Mike Moran, who worked with Elvis Presley, Perry Como, and David Bowie, and Broadway cast albums including "Hair" among others.
