= Howard Scott =

Howard Scott may refer to:

- Howard Scott (engineer) (1890–1970), American engineer and founder of Technocracy Incorporated and the Technical Alliance
- Howard Scott (translator), Canadian literary translator
- Howard E. Scott (born 1946), American musician, founding member of the band War
- Howard H. Scott (1920–2012), American sound engineer and producer
- Howie Scott, a character in the TV series City Lights

== See also ==
- Scott Howard (disambiguation)
