= Scott Howard (disambiguation) =

Scott Howard is a World Champion Curler.

Scott Howard may also refer to:

- Scott Howard, the main character in the 1985 film Teen Wolf
- Scott Howard, baritone singer of Legacy Five
- Scott Howard, editor of the Brock Citizen

== See also ==
- Howard Scott (disambiguation)
