= Freddie Gershon =

American lawyer

Freddie Gershon is an American entertainment attorney and author. He is the former president of the Robert Stigwood Group, former co-chairperson of SESAC, and current co-chairperson of Music Theatre International.

== Education ==
Gershon studied classical music at the Juilliard School. He graduated from Columbia Law School in 1964.

== Career ==
Gershon's clients include film director Michael Ritchie, choreographer Ron Field, playwright Tom Eyen, rock band Chicago, drummer Pete Best, and writer Shel Silverstein.

In 1976, Gershon became Robert Stigwood's partner in RSO Records, which he represented on landmark concert tours, including the Broadway production and film Jesus Christ Superstar, as well as Eric Clapton, the Bee Gees, and the financing of Tommy the film.

Later, Gershon partnered with CBS and Allan Carr to produce an album for Plácido Domingo called Goya: A Life in Song, as well as the Broadway show, La Cage aux Folles. He also produced Evita, Saturday Night Fever, Grease, and Gallipoli.

Since 2018, Gerson has been co-chairperson of Music Theatre International (MTI), which licenses amateur rights to Broadway shows. At MTI, Gershon developed the Broadway Junior Program, which brings art, theater, dance, and music to children.

Gershon's book Sweetie, Baby, Cookie, Honey, is a roman a clef novel about the music industry of 1960s through 1980s.

After Freddie and Myrna Gershon in 2013 tracked the effects of a musical theater program for autistic children, the couple executive produced a 2014 documentary profiling the program, titled Spectrum of Hope, directed by Danny Mendoza.

Gershon's latest project is Broadway Senior, which adapts shows, such as Into the Woods, for senior citizens.

== Philanthropy ==
Gershon has been active in charities such as the ArtsConnection, and has served as vice chairperson of the Development Committee for New York University's Tisch School of the Arts.

Gershon also created the Freddie G Fellowship, which each year selects eight theater instructors to attend an all-expenses-paid, four-day trip to New York City to work one-on-one with industry professionals in seminars, master classes, and Broadway shows. Each teacher's school also receives $5,000 from Gershon and his wife, Myrna, to enhance their respective arts programs.

In 2010, Gershon created and funded, with his wife, Myrna, the Kennedy Center/Stephen Sondheim Inspirational Teacher Awards. The awards provide grants to outstanding teachers in the United States.

== Awards ==
In 2012 Gershon was awarded a Tony Honor for Excellence in the Theatre for creating Broadway Junior.

The New York Historical Society honored Gershon and his wife, Myrna at the 2013 American Musicals Project Benefit for the couple's philanthropic work benefitting children through performing arts.

== Personal life ==
Gershon lives in New York City with his wife, Myrna.

Gershon grew up in Bayside, New York, with his close friend Eddie Birnbaum (who died on April 23, 2022) for whom he wrote a New York Times death notice.

Gershon is married to former Screen Gems motion picture marketing executive, Myrna Gershon. She is widely credited as the mastermind behind the creation of Flintstones Chewable Vitamins. Gershon, Freddie (7 October 2010). "Myrna's Prehistoric Journey to Yabba Dabba Do". HuffPost.
