= Dynaflex (RCA) =

Trademark for thin, lightweight vinyl LP record (1969–1979)

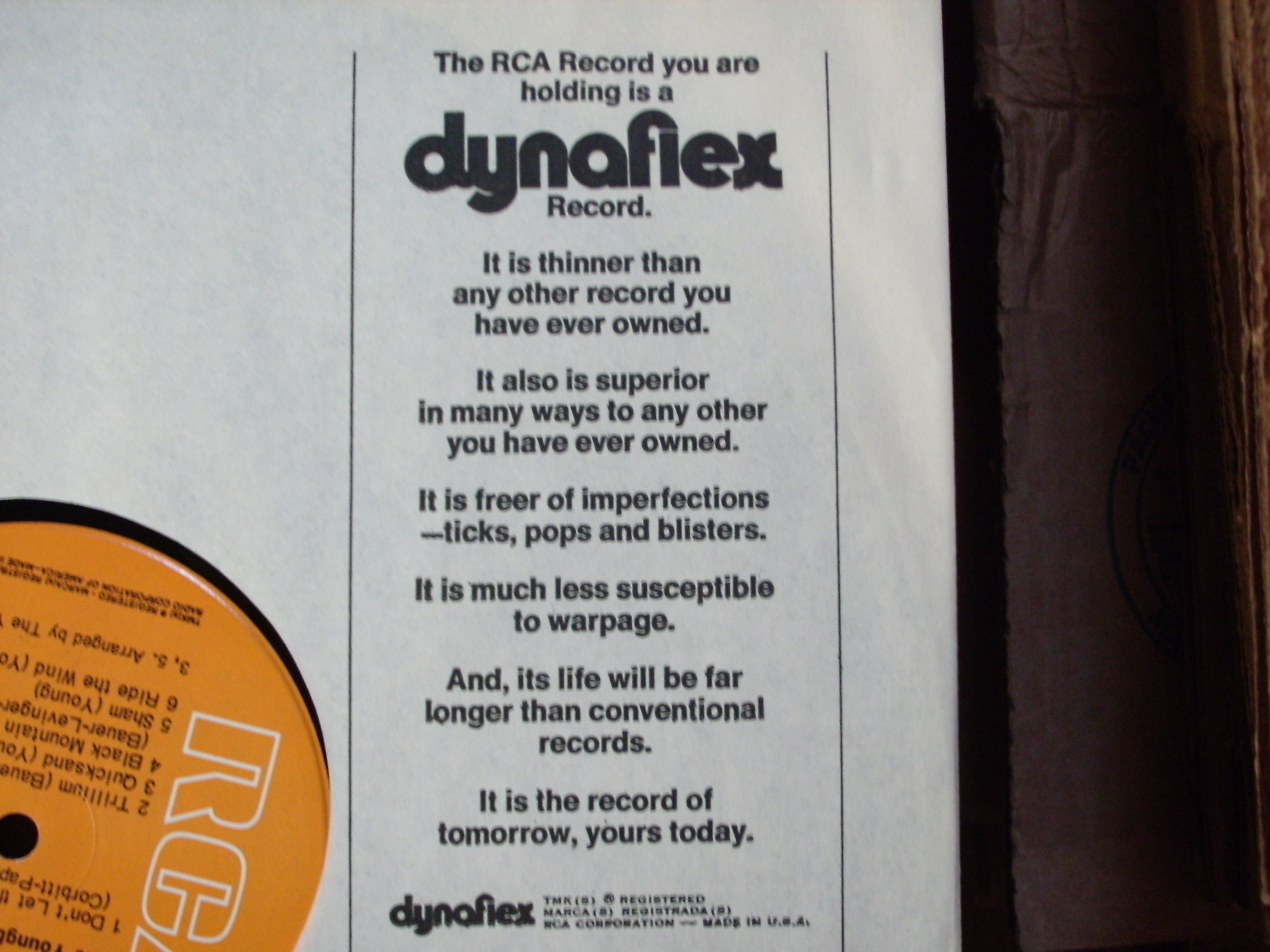
An RCA Inner sleeve from c. 1970 touts the superiority of Dynaflex records.

Dynaflex is a trademark for a thin, lightweight vinyl LP phonograph record introduced by RCA Records in late 1969. Rather than the stiff plastic material used by conventional vinyl pressings, Dynaflex records used a softer, pliable formulation that allowed RCA to save money by using less material. RCA's Dynaflex records weighed approximately 90 grams, significantly less than the 135 to 190 grams of a conventional LP record.

At the time, most industry record pressing plants were using recycled or "reground" vinyl as a cost-saving measure; old and unsold records had the centers with paper labels cut out; the records were then melted down and reused to make new records. Such recycled vinyl records typically sounded much noisier and scratchier when played than a record made from new or "virgin" vinyl; collectors noted that records pressed from reground vinyl sometimes had small remnants of paper labels or other materials embedded in them.

RCA's Dynaflex records varied somewhat in thickness, but most easily flopped back and forth when held between the hands. Some were so thin and flexible they could actually be bent nearly in half. This flexibility also gave them theoretically more resiliency in shipping, resulting in fewer returns from retailers due to breakage and cracks.

Opinions from record collectors and audiophiles were divided as to the sound quality of Dynaflex records. Some felt that the sound quality actually improved, due to the purer vinyl used, and better processes for removing impurities in the vinyl compounds; others felt that Dynaflex pressings were noisier and lacked bass frequencies compared to conventional records, and also had more rumble (low frequency noise) than conventional records. While RCA claimed that Dynaflex records were less noisy and less susceptible to warpage and would last longer than conventional vinyl records, some consumers (particularly classical listeners) derisively referred to the new product as “Dynawarp” because of evidence that Dynaflex records were prone to warp on dealers' shelves, just from the pressure of the shrink wrap on the album jacket. Some critics charged that Dynaflex was nothing more than a ploy devised by RCA to save money by using less vinyl than in traditional, thicker records.

RCA Records apparently never fully implemented the use of Dynaflex, as regular thicker vinyl records continued to be manufactured; many titles issued by RCA were available in both Dynaflex and heavier vinyl pressings. Around 1974–75, RCA began to gradually reduce the number of Dynaflex records being manufactured and, by the end of the decade, Dynaflex had been discontinued entirely.
