= Music Theatre International =

Theatrical licensing agency in New York

- Company type: Private
- Industry: Entertainment
- Founded: 1952; 74 years ago
- Founders: Frank Loesser, Don Walker
- Headquarters: 423 West 55th Street, New York, NY 10019; 12-14 Mortimer Street, London, England; 20-22 Albert Road, South Melbourne, Victoria, Australia
- Areas served: Worldwide
- Key people: Drew Cohen; John Prignano; Freddie Gershon
- Owner: Cameron Mackintosh
- Number of employees: 100
- Parent: MTI Enterprises Inc.
- Website: www.mtishows.com

Music Theatre International (MTI) is a theatrical licensing agency based in New York City and founded in 1952 by American composer and lyricist Frank Loesser and orchestrator Don Walker. Along with licensing the rights to Loesser's works, the firm licenses production rights of over 500 Broadway, Off-Broadway, and West End musicals. Cameron Mackintosh became a partner in 1990 and majority owner in 2015.

== History ==
Founded in 1952, the organization started by representing the rights to approximately 40 shows in the US and in a handful of countries around the world.

CBS acquired MTI in 1976. After SBK acquired CBS' music publishing in 1986, MTI was spun-off as a separate company to a group led by Nicholas Firth. A different group led by Freddie Gershon acquired MTI in 1989. In 1996, MTI launched the Broadway Junior collection of musicals which are 30- and 60-minute musicals for performance by elementary and middle school-aged students. Broadway Junior musicals are author-approved versions, with the music written in keys that are appropriate for developing voices. Each license for a Broadway Junior musical comes with a ShowKit of materials with rehearsal and performance tracks and a director's guide.

In 2003, MTI's School Editions (shows annotated for performance by high school students) were brought to the market. These educational versions come with materials and resources designed to increase access to the arts for young people.

In 2012, the American Theatre Wing recognized MTI Chairman Freddie Gershon with a Tony Honor for Excellence for creating Broadway Junior and audience-building programs for the industry.

On May 29, 2012, New York City Mayor Michael Bloomberg declared "Music Theatre International Day", writing in a proclamation, “For the past 60 years, Music Theatre International has brought great American musicals to young artists and audiences around the country. Founders Frank Loesser and Don Walker shared a commitment to arts classics like Guys and Dolls to a catalog of contemporary Disney favorites to life in schools and acting programs in more than 60 countries around the world. By providing scripts and materials to theaters throughout the five boroughs and around the globe, MTI, under the leadership of Freddie Gershon, has expanded the horizons of so many young New Yorkers, and helped engage the next generations of leaders in the performing arts."

The company celebrated its 70th anniversary in 2022.

== Education and Advocacy ==
Since 1938, the Educational Theatre Association surveys theatre practitioners to compile a list of the most-produced plays, musicals, and short plays in U.S. high schools during the school year. For the 2021–2022 season, seven of MTI's musicals were featured in the top 10 of full-length musicals, with Mamma Mia! taking the top spot.

Since 2003, MTI has been the founding sponsor of the annual Junior Theater Festival which is a celebration of young performers performing excerpts from the company's Broadway Junior musicals.

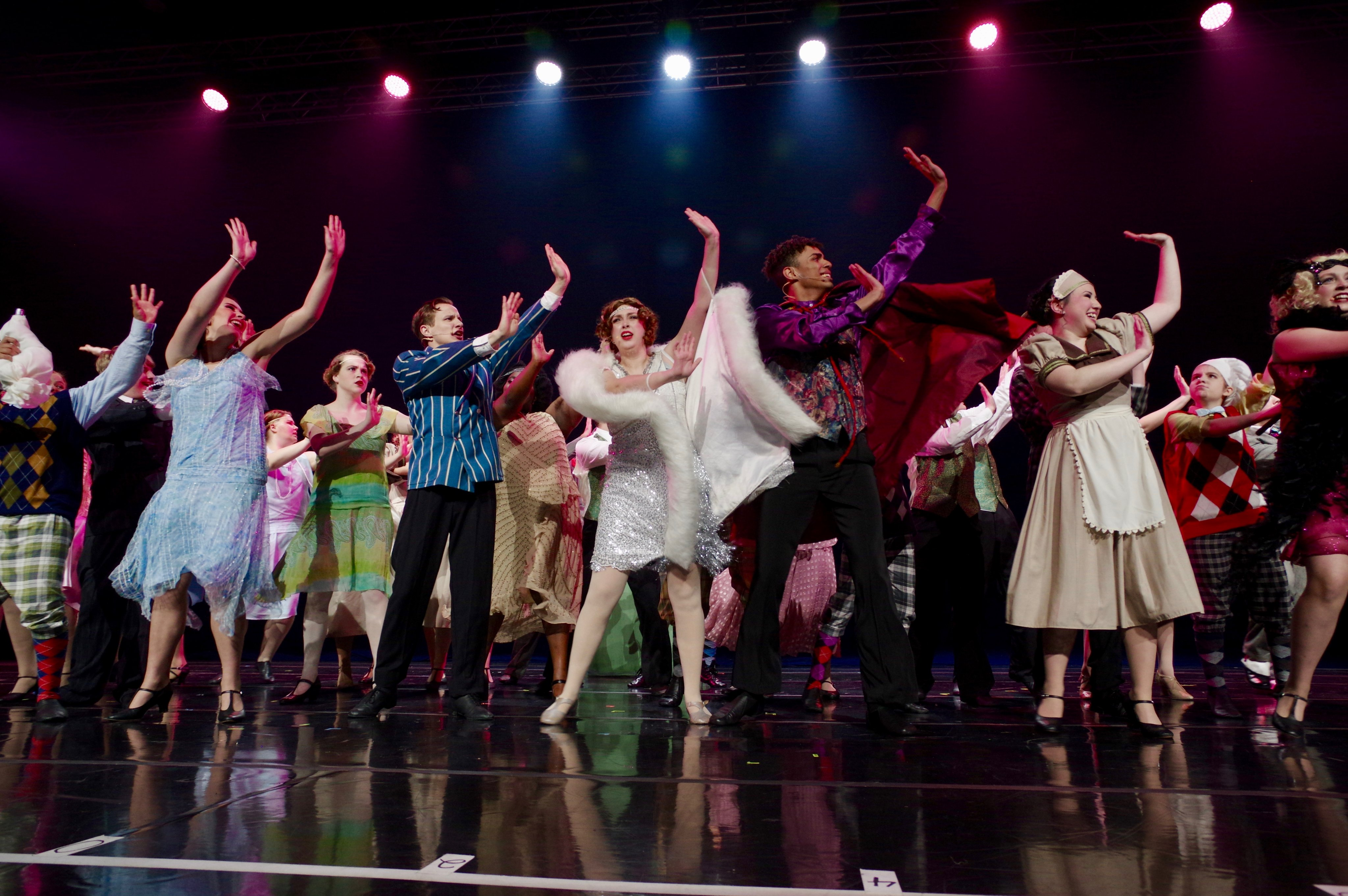
Students perform a musical number at Junior Theatre Festival in February 2023.

In 2015, JumpStart Theatre was formed as a partnership between Educational Theatre Association, iTheatrics and Music Theatre International with the goal of creating sustainable musical theatre programs in under-served middle schools. Through the partnership, nine schools in Cincinnati have established ongoing musical theatre programs.

During the height of the 2020 COVID-19 pandemic, MTI created a royalty-free revue of songs from their catalog and provided it to any high school or community theatre organization that was interested. The revue, entitled All Together Now! was performed by over 2000 theatres in 50 states and 31 countries over the weekend of November 12–15, 2021. The theatrical organizations producing the show raised a collective $6.2 million for their programs.

In 2023, DreamWorks Theatricals announced the selection of four emerging writers to help develop new musical adaptations of DreamWorks Animation films for the theatrical licensing agency Music Theatre International's catalogue. Sponsored by DreamWorks Theatricals and MTI in partnership with NBCUniversal's Global Talent Development & Inclusion team, the selected writers are Krista Knight, Joriah Kwamé, Veronica Mansour, and Kate Thomas.

== Musical types ==
MTI holds various types of musicals that can be licensed.

- MTI Show: These are shows from various types of theater such as Broadway including musicals such as Ragtime, Ain't Misbehavin', Pippin, Alice by Heart, and Seussical.
- Broadway Junior: These sixty-minute musicals have been adapted for middle school kids to perform as one act. Any subject matter deemed inappropriate has been cut. These include junior versions of Annie, Fiddler on the Roof, The Lion King, The Little Mermaid, and The Music Man.
- Broadway Kids: These thirty-minute musicals have been specially adapted for elementary kids to perform. These musicals have been made exclusively for the Kids Collection. Such musicals include: Winnie the Pooh, The Lion King, and 101 Dalmatians.
- Broadway Senior: These include various musicals for performers aged 55 and older, such as The Music Man SR., Guys and Dolls SR., Singin' in the Rain SR., Fiddler on the Roof SR., and Into the Woods SR.
- Musicals From The Disney Collection: Consists of musicals originally produced by Disney.
- School Editions: These are Broadway musicals that have been adapted for high school students to perform. These musicals have reduced certain subject matter and orchestration. Such School Editions include: Rent, Sweeney Todd, Les Misérables, and Avenue Q.
- Theatre For Young Audiences: These seventy-minute musicals have been adapted for adults to perform for children. The cast requirement is small (usually 6–12).
- Concert Library: This collection has Broadway songs adapted for concerts.

== Key executives ==
- Cameron Mackintosh, Chairman
- Freddie Gershon, Co-chairman
- Drew H. Cohen, President & CEO
- John Prignano, COO and Director of Education & Development
- Carol Edelson, Senior Vice President of Licensing
- Rita Thibault, CFO
- Deborah Hartnett, Senior Vice President of General Counsel
- Jason Cocovinis, Director of Marketing
- Brian O'Sullivan, Director of Amateur Licensing
- Jody Edwards, Music & Materials Manager
- John Vantuno, CIO

== Rating system ==
MTI uses a rating system that determines the content in the musical. The ratings are as follows:

Rating	Description
G	Subject matter is appropriate for most audiences. This includes the Junior versions of musicals Fiddler on the Roof, Guys and Dolls, and Seussical.
PG & PG-13	Contains some subject matter or language that either is considered mature or that might be deemed inappropriate for some audience members. This includes Les Misérables and Into the Woods.
R	Contains subject matter or language that is not suitable for children or may not be appropriate for all audiences. This includes Avenue Q and Miss Saigon.
