= Les Leverett =

American photographer (1927–2023)

- Born: Laslie Leverett; April 23, 1927; Montgomery, Alabama, U.S.
- Died: June 2, 2023 (aged 96); Nashville, Tennessee, U.S.
- Occupation: Photographer
- Years active: 1952–2009
- Known for: Staff photographer of the Grand Ole Opry (1960–1992)
- Spouse: Dorothy Vandiver (m. 1949)
- Awards: Grammy Award for Best Album Cover – Photography (1967)

Laslie "Les" Leverett (April 23, 1927 – June 2, 2023) was an American photographer who was a staff photographer at the Grand Ole Opry from 1960 until 1992. Across those 32 years he assembled an extensive photographic record of postwar country music, and his pictures were used on more than 200 album covers. He received a Grammy Award in 1967 for his photograph on the cover of Porter Wagoner's album Confessions of a Broken Man.

== Early life ==
Leverett was born in Montgomery, Alabama, on April 23, 1927. The son of an itinerant Baptist preacher, he grew up in a succession of small towns in southern Alabama. Drafted into the Army at eighteen, he spent the closing stages of World War II as a surgical technician aboard a troop ship, improvising a darkroom on board and taking up photography in earnest. After his discharge he enrolled under the G.I. Bill at the Texas College of Photographic Arts in San Antonio, where he also acquired his taste for country music. In San Antonio, he met Dorothy "Dot" Vandiver, a Nashville native. The couple married in 1949 and moved to her home city the following year.

== Career ==
In Nashville Leverett worked first in advertising and portrait photography, photographing merchandise for newspaper advertisements before joining the commercial firm Associated Photographers and subsequently Frederick's Studio. In 1960 the National Life and Accident Insurance Company hired him to establish its photographic department, a position that covered the insurer's broadcasting interests: WSM radio, WSM-TV and the Grand Ole Opry. Working backstage week after week, he photographed most performers of the period, among them Roy Acuff, Patsy Cline, Johnny Cash, Bill Monroe, Loretta Lynn, Minnie Pearl, Dolly Parton and Garth Brooks. He also rescued WSM's own photographic record of its first quarter-century after learning that the company planned to discard it. Besides his staff work he supplied cover photographs for over 200 albums and served as photographer for the television series of Johnny Cash and, later, Marty Stuart.

== Later years ==
Leverett retired in 1992 and afterwards licensed his pictures to publishers and record companies, returning to regular work in 2009 as photographer for The Marty Stuart Show on RFD-TV. He published a collection of his bluegrass photographs, Blue Moon of Kentucky, in 1996, and in 2005 produced American Music Legends with his daughter Libby Leverett-Crew, herself a professional photographer. In February 2017, Ryman Hospitality Properties purchased thousands of his slides, negatives, prints and transparencies, along with his handwritten notes, for the Grand Ole Opry Archives. The acquisition helped offset photographic holdings the Opry had lost in the Cumberland River flood of 2010. About 50 of the images were displayed at the Acuff House from April 30 to October 31, 2018, in the exhibition Family Reunion: The Opry Family Photo Album, and more than 80 appeared in Ken Burns's documentary series Country Music.

== Death ==
Leverett died in Nashville on June 2, 2023, at the age of 96.

== Awards ==
For his portrait of Porter Wagoner on the 1966 album Confessions of a Broken Man, Leverett shared the Grammy Award for Best Album Cover – Photography with the art director Robert M. Jones at the 9th Annual Grammy Awards, held in 1967. It was his sole nomination. Billboard named his cover for Dolly Parton's Bubbling Over its country album cover of the year in 1973. He was added to the Country Music Hall of Fame's Walkway of Stars in 1994 and received a Distinguished Achievement Award from the International Bluegrass Music Association in 2001. He also received the Reunion of Professional Entertainers' Media Person of the Year award in 2004 and, in 2006, the first Distinguished Achievement Award presented by the California Bluegrass Association. In 2018, he was inducted into the Tennessee Journalism Hall of Fame in recognition of his service to photojournalism in the state.

== Bibliography ==
- Leverett, Les (1996). Blue Moon of Kentucky: A Journey into the World of Bluegrass and Country Music as Seen Through the Camera Lens of Photo-Journalist Les Leverett. Madison, North Carolina: Empire Publishing.
