= Crying Time =

Single by Ray Charles

from the album Crying Time
- B-side: "When My Dreamboat Comes Home"
- Released: November 1965
- Genre: Country; soul blues
- Length: 2:53
- Label: ABC-Paramount
- Songwriter: Buck Owens
- Producer: Joe Adams

Ray Charles singles chronology
"The Cincinnati Kid" (1965)	"Crying Time" (1965)	"Together Again" (1966)

"Crying Time" is a song from 1964 written and originally recorded by the American country music artist Buck Owens. It gained greater success in the version recorded by American singer, songwriter, and pianist Ray Charles, which won two Grammy Awards in 1967. Numerous other cover versions have been performed and recorded over the intervening years.

Original release by Buck Owens, Capitol 5336, 1964.

== History ==
Owens recorded the original version of his song and released it as the B side to the 45 single "I've Got a Tiger By the Tail" in 1964, Capitol 5336, but it failed to reach the music charts. A cover version of "Crying Time" was then recorded by R&B singer Ray Charles, and his version proved to be a hit. Featuring backing vocals by the Jack Halloran Singers and The Raelettes, the song reached number six on the US Billboard Hot 100 chart in February 1966. Charles' version of the song also peaked at number five on the R&B chart and spent three weeks at number one on the easy listening chart. In the United Kingdom, the song reached number 50 on the UK Singles Chart. In addition, Charles' version of "Crying Time" won two Grammy Awards in 1967, in the categories Best R&B Recording and Best R&B Solo Performance.

== Style ==
Charles intended his version of Owens' song to be a tribute to the country music style he appreciated (Charles had successfully covered other country music songs in the past, such as "I Can't Stop Loving You"). He was quoted as saying that he did not record "Crying Time", and other country songs written by Owens, "out of disrespect for Buck. I'm crazy about Buck. But I heard something that fit my style. The key was keeping my style while watching my style work in different ways."

== Charts ==
=== Weekly charts ===
Chart (1965–66)	Peak position
Canada Top Singles (RPM)	4
UK Singles (OCC)	50
US Billboard Hot 100	6
US Adult Contemporary (Billboard)	1
US Hot R&B (Billboard)	5
US Cash Box Top 100	6

=== Year-end charts ===
Chart (1966)	Rank
US Easy Listening	6
US Billboard Hot 100	52
US Cash Box Top 100	47

== Notable cover versions ==
- Lorrie Morgan recorded a cover of the song for the soundtrack to the 1993 film The Beverly Hillbillies. Her version peaked at number 59 on the US Billboard Hot Country Singles & Tracks chart.
- Bill Medley recorded a cover of the song along with Michael McDonald for his 2025 album Straight From the Heart.
- 2021 - John Greene, Crying Time Again
- Dean Martin Recorded a version of the song for his 1969 album ‘’I Take a Lot of Pride in What I Am’’
- Nancy Sinatra Also recorded a version titled ‘’Cryin’ Time’’ for her album ‘’How Does That Grab You?’’

== See also ==
- List of number-one adult contemporary singles of 1966 (U.S.)
