= Del Bryant =

American businessperson

Del R. Bryant is an American businessperson. He was the head of the performing rights organization BMI from 2003 to 2014.

== Biography ==
Del Bryant is the son of Felice and Boudleaux Bryant. Often present backstage at the Grand Ole Opry during his parents' engagements, he was introduced to the music industry early in life, often being present backstage at the Grand Ole Opry during his parents' engagements.

Bryant's career path led him to BMI, then the leading music rights organization in the United States. His role at BMI varied, from engaging with new and established writers to reforming the royalty distribution system.

In 1990, he was appointed senior vice president of BMI. He was named president and CEO in 2003. He oversaw the rejuvenation of BMI's Film & Television Department in Los Angeles and the establishment of new Latin music and R&B/hip-hop divisions in Miami and Atlanta, respectively, contributing to the development of an American-centric music catalog.

In May 2013, Bryant announced his retirement as the CEO of BMI. He retired from the post in June 2014.

Bryant has served in numerous industry leadership roles, including chairman of the board of FastTrack and a board member of BMI, CISAC, the Songwriters Hall of Fame, and the Broadcasters Foundation of America. He was inducted into the Songwriters Hall of Fame in 2014.

Bryant lives on a farm outside of Nashville. He was featured in the Ken Burns documentary series, Country Music.
