= Howard H. Scott =

Howard Hillison Scott (May 31, 1920 – September 22, 2012) was a sound engineer and producer. He is credited with helping to develop the LP as part of a team at CBS Laboratories headed by Peter Goldmark. He also won a Grammy Award for Classical Album of the Year for producing Ives' Symphony No. 1 in collaboration with conductor Morton Gould. He died on September 22, 2012, in Reading, PA, at the age of 92.
