= Nicholas Firth =

External videos
- Oral History, Nick Firth talks about the decline in the quality of song-writing because bands today feel the need to write every song on their album. Interview date June 3, 2010, NAMM (National Association of Music Merchants) Oral History Library

Nicholas Louis Douglas Firth (born October 1942) is the former head of Chappell & Co. and BMG Music Publishing.

== Career ==
Firth's career in music publishing began in 1962, where he worked for the Chappell Group, then a division of PolyGram BV, culminating with simultaneous positions as President of Chappell International and Vice President of the PolyGram Publishing Division, which he held from 1981 to 1985, when PolyGram sold Chappell. Subsequently, Mr. Firth was a shareholder and CEO of Music Theatre International. Mr. Firth was later Chairman and CEO of BMG Music Publishing, the largest independent music publisher in the world and the third largest music publisher among all publishers. BMG was sold to Universal Music Publishing Group in 2007.

His grandfather Louis Dreyfus and great uncle Max Dreyfus owned Chappell & Company in New York City and London.

Nicholas Firth serves on the Boards of the American Society of Composers, Authors and Publishers (ASCAP), the National Music Publishers Association (NMPA), the International Music Publishers Association (IMPA), the Third Street Music School Settlement, and the Mannes College of Music.

Nick serves as chairman of the advisory board of musiXmatch.

== Personal life ==
Firth was born in London, England, grew up in the United States of America, and then returned to the UK, where he got his first publishing job.

Nicholas Firth was married to his second wife, Edmée, née de Montmollin for 31 years until her death. His first marriage ended in divorce. He lives in Bedford New York.
