= Hubert Long =

American music executive

- Born: December 3, 1923; Poteet, Texas, U.S.
- Died: September 7, 1972 (aged 48); Nashville, Tennessee, U.S.
- Years active: 1945–1972
- Known for: Country music talent agency
- Awards: Country Music Hall of Fame, 1979

Hubert Long (December 3, 1923 – September 7, 1972) was an American music executive known for his promotion of country music artists from the early 1950s to his death in 1972. Long created a talent agency named for him in 1952 and one of Nashville's first independent talent agencies, Stable of Stars, three years later. A founding board member of the Country Music Association (CMA) and the Country Music Foundation (CMF), Long was posthumously inducted into the Country Music Hall of Fame in 1979.

== Early life ==
Long was born in Poteet, Texas, but grew up in Freer where he graduated from high school in 1942. Long served in the United States Navy from 1942 to 1945 before returning to Corpus Christi, Texas, to work in a record store. In 1946, Long moved to San Antonio to work for Decca Records. When Long's supervisor left Decca for RCA Records, he followed. While at RCA, Long would meet Colonel Tom Parker, who hired him to do publicity work for Eddy Arnold. It was while he was managing Arnold that Long would move to Nashville and get into the promotional business.

== Move to Nashville ==
Despite moving to Nashville with Parker, Long would be named manager of the Louisiana Hayride in Shreveport in 1950. While with the Louisiana Hayride, Long would sign both Webb Pierce and Faron Young to management contracts. To help better management his growing list of stars, Long established the Hubert Long Agency in Nashville in 1952 for talent bookings and then the Stable of Stars in 1955 which was one of Nashville's first independent talent agencies.

== Other businesses established in Nashville ==
By 1959, Long formed his first music publishing business, Moss Rose, and was also responsible for the construction of Nashville's SESAC Building. The following year, Long's business had expanded beyond the United States into the United Kingdom, Japan, Australia, South Africa, and several other European countries. By 1964, Long's talent and music publishing businesses were firmly entrenched in Nashville's Music Row, with his office right next to Columbia Records recording studios (now part of Sony Music Nashville.) Among the stars under his agency included Skeeter Davis, Ray Price, Chet Atkins, Little Jimmy Dickens, Ferlin Husky, Don Gibson, Bill Anderson, Jan Howard, Mel Tillis, and Brenda Lee. Long stated in 1964 that "Business looks good. It certainly looks good to me. I see a continually growing future in this industry and as long we are good to it, it will be good to us." Parker was also given praise from Long in that same article along with adding more space to his rapidly growing business.

At the time of his 1972 death, Long also owned an advertising agency and three additional music publishing firms.

== Role in establishing CMA and CMF ==
Long would be a founding member of the CMA and the CMF in the late 1950s, becoming the president of both organizations. Long served as secretary of the CMA when it was founded in 1958. He served as CMA President in 1968 and was its chairman in 1972 when he had medical issues.

== Illness and death ==
In March 1972, Long was admitted to a hospital in Nashville for surgery to remove a brain tumor (Source listed it incorrectly as 1982.). The surgery was not successful in removing the tumor, and Long died on September 7, 1972, in Nashville. Funeral services were held two days later in Nashville with honorary pallbearers including Nashville Mayor Beverly Briley, Jerry Bradley, Jo Walker-Meador (listed as Jo Walker), Frances Preston, Howard, Ken Nelson, Huskey, Tex Ritter, Arnold, Parker, Bud Wendell, Atkins, Jack Stapp, Young, and Jimmie Davis while actual pallbearers included were Anderson and Owen Bradley (All names mentioned except for Briley, Howard, and Parker are Country Music Hall of Fame inductees as of 2026.).

== Legacy ==
In 1979, Long would be posthumously inducted into the Country Music Hall of Fame. Joining Long that year would be Hank Snow.
