= List of Country Music Hall of Fame inductees =

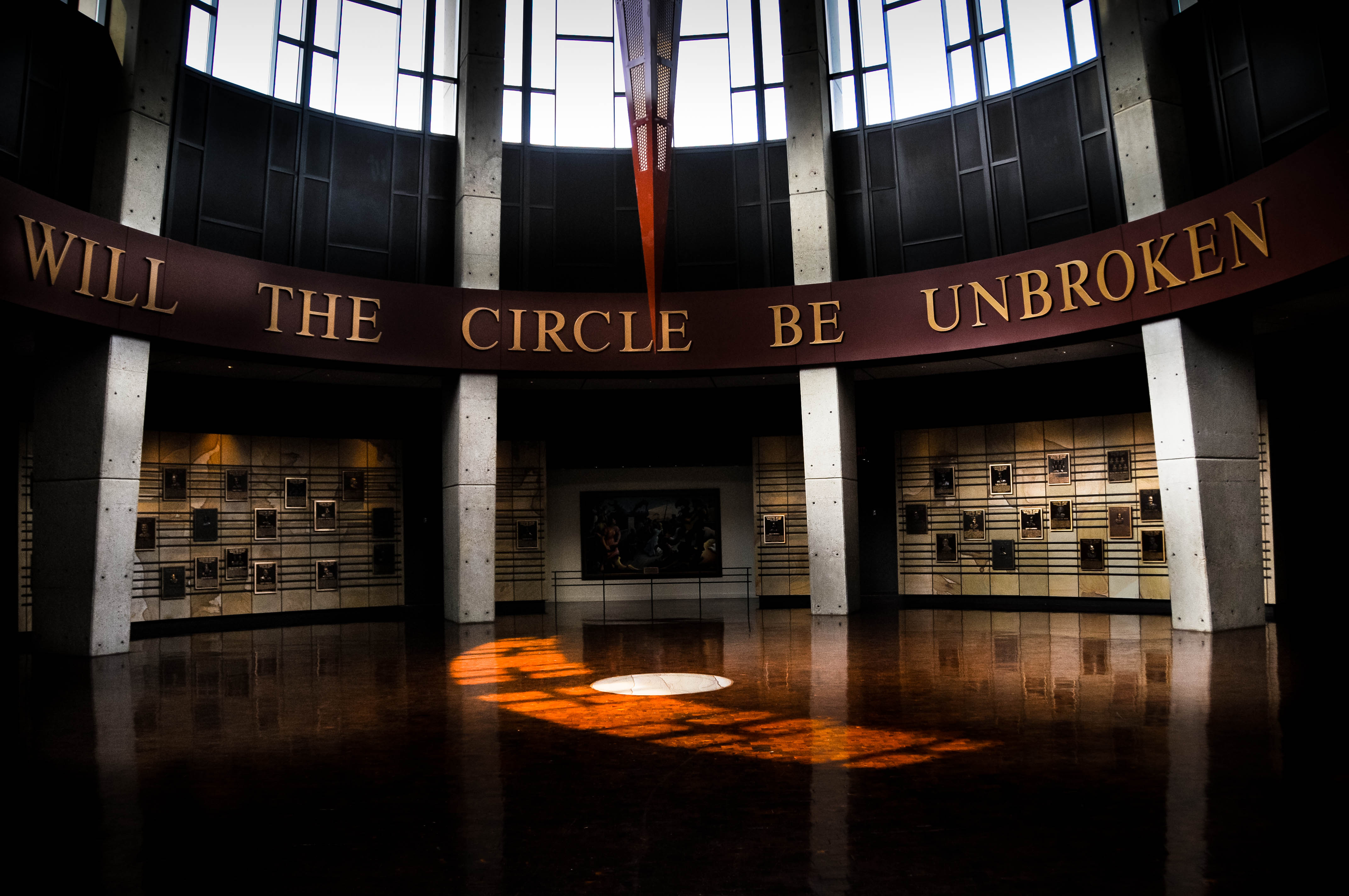
The rotunda of the Country Music Hall of Fame and Museum in Nashville, Tennessee.

This is a list of the 161 inductees to the Country Music Hall of Fame and Museum, as of 2026, counting groups as a single inductee. The Hall of Fame was established in 1961 with three inductees: Jimmie Rodgers, Hank Williams, and Williams's Music Producer Fred Rose.

To date, Roy Rogers is the only artist to have been inducted twice: first in 1980 as a member of the Sons of the Pioneers and again in 1988 as a solo artist. The induction of Harold Bradley in 2006 marked the first time two members of the same family were inducted into the Hall individually, following his brother Owen Bradley, who was inducted as part of the class of 1974. Owen's son Jerry was subsequently inducted in 2019. Hank Williams (inducted 1961), and his son Hank Williams Jr. (inducted 2020) are the only other family to have multiple separate inductees. To date, nine groups have been inducted that include members of the same family: Maybelle and Sara Carter of the Carter Family (cousins), the Delmore, Everly, Louvin, and Stanley Brothers; Randy Owen, Teddy Gentry and Jeff Cook of Alabama (cousins); Harold and Don Reid of the Statler Brothers (brothers), The Browns (siblings), and The Judds (mother and daughter). In addition, the Hall also includes two married couples who were inducted together: A.P. and Sara Carter (divorced by the time they were inducted) and Felice and Boudleaux Bryant, and three couples who were inducted for their individual achievements: former husband and wife George Jones (inducted 1992) and Tammy Wynette (inducted 1998), Johnny Cash (inducted 1980) and June Carter Cash (inducted 2025), and currently married couple Connie Smith (inducted 2012), and Marty Stuart (inducted 2020). Carter Cash is also the daughter of Carter Family inductee Maybelle and niece of Sara and A. P. Carter.

Eighteen members of the Country Music Hall of Fame are also inducted into the Rock and Roll Hall of Fame.

== 1960s ==
Inductees in the 1960s
Image	Inductee	Year	Birth date	Death date	Notes
	Jimmie Rodgers	1961	September 8, 1897	May 26, 1933	Singer-songwriter and musician
	Fred Rose	1961	August 24, 1898	December 1, 1954	Songwriter and music publisher
	Hank Williams	1961	September 17, 1923	January 1, 1953	Singer-songwriter
	Roy Acuff	1962	September 15, 1903	November 23, 1992	Singer-songwriter and music publisher. The first living inductee.
	Tex Ritter	1964	January 12, 1905	January 2, 1974	Singer and actor
	Ernest Tubb	1965	February 9, 1914	September 6, 1984	Singer-songwriter
	Eddy Arnold	1966	May 15, 1918	May 8, 2008	Singer-songwriter, actor and TV host
	James R. "Jim" Denny	1966	February 28, 1911	August 27, 1963	Music executive
	George D. Hay	1966	November 9, 1895	May 8, 1968	Inventor and promoter
	Uncle Dave Macon	1966	October 7, 1870	March 22, 1952	Entertainer and musician
	Red Foley	1967	June 17, 1910	September 19, 1968	Singer, musician, actor, radio and TV Host
	J.L. (Joe) Frank	1967	April 15, 1900	May 4, 1952	Music executive
Jim Reeves 1963	Jim Reeves	1967	August 20, 1923	July 31, 1964	Singer, songwriter, actor, TV & radio Personality, disc jockey, pioneer of the Nashville sound
	Stephen H. Sholes	1967	February 12, 1911	April 22, 1968	Music executive
	Bob Wills	1968	March 6, 1905	May 13, 1975	Musician and songwriter
	Gene Autry	1969	September 29, 1907	October 2, 1998	Singer and actor

== 1970s ==
Inductees in the 1970s
Image	Inductee	Year	Birth date	Death date	Notes
	The Carter Family	1970	A. P. Carter (December 15, 1891); Sara Carter (July 21, 1898); Maybelle Carter (May 10, 1909)	A. P. (November 7, 1960); Sara (January 8, 1979); Maybelle (October 23, 1978)	Singers
	Bill Monroe	1970	September 13, 1911	September 9, 1996	Singer and pioneer of Bluegrass music (shown left in the photo)
	Art Satherley	1971	October 19, 1889	February 10, 1986	Music executive. First non-American inducted.
	Jimmie Davis	1972	September 11, 1899	November 5, 2000	Singer-songwriter, governor of Louisiana
	Chet Atkins	1973	June 20, 1924	June 30, 2001	Musician and record producer
	Patsy Cline	1973	September 8, 1932	March 5, 1963	Singer
	Owen Bradley	1974	October 21, 1915	January 7, 1998	Record producer
	Pee Wee King	1974	February 18, 1914	March 7, 2000	Singer-songwriter
	Minnie Pearl	1975	October 25, 1912	March 4, 1996	Comedian
	Paul Cohen	1976	November 10, 1908	April 1, 1970	Record producer
	Kitty Wells	1976	August 30, 1919	July 16, 2012	Singer
	Merle Travis	1977	November 29, 1917	October 20, 1983	Musician and songwriter
	Grandpa Jones	1978	October 20, 1913	February 19, 1998	Musician and comedian
	Hubert Long	1979	December 3, 1923	September 7, 1972	Music executive
	Hank Snow	1979	May 9, 1914	December 20, 1999	Singer-Songwriter. First non-American performer inducted.

== 1980s ==
Inductees in the 1980s
Image	Inductee	Year	Birth date	Death date	Notes
	Johnny Cash	1980	February 26, 1932	September 12, 2003	Singer-songwriter and TV personality
	Connie B. Gay	1980	August 22, 1914	December 3, 1989	Music executive
	Sons of the Pioneers	1980	Roy Rogers (November 5, 1911); Bob Nolan (April 1, 1908); Lloyd Perryman (January 29, 1917); Tim Spencer (July 13, 1908); Hugh Farr (December 6, 1903); Karl Farr (April 29, 1909)	Rogers (July 6, 1998); Nolan (June 16, 1980); Perryman (May 31, 1977); Spencer (April 26, 1974); H. Farr (March 17, 1980); K. Farr (September 20, 1961)	Singers. Rogers was later inducted as a solo artist in 1988, which made him the only person inducted twice. Nolan is most recent non-American performer in the Hall of Fame (Canadian born)
	Vernon Dalhart	1981	April 6, 1883	September 14, 1948	Singer
	Grant Turner	1981	May 17, 1912	October 19, 1991	Announcer
	Lefty Frizzell	1982	March 31, 1928	July 19, 1975	Singer-songwriter
	Roy Horton	1982	November 5, 1914	September 23, 2003	Music executive
	Marty Robbins	1982	September 26, 1925	December 8, 1982	Singer-songwriter
	Little Jimmy Dickens	1983	December 19, 1920	January 2, 2015	Singer
	Ralph Peer	1984	May 22, 1892	January 19, 1960	Music executive
	Floyd Tillman	1984	December 8, 1914	August 22, 2003	Singer-songwriter
	Flatt and Scruggs	1985	Lester Flatt (June 19, 1914); Earl Scruggs (January 6, 1924)	Flatt (May 11, 1979); Scruggs (March 28, 2012)	Singers, musicians
	The Duke of Paducah (Whitey Ford)	1986	May 12, 1901	June 20, 1986	Entertainer
	Wesley Rose	1986	February 11, 1918	April 26, 1990	Music executive
	Rod Brasfield	1987	August 22, 1910	September 12, 1958	Comedian
	Loretta Lynn	1988	April 14, 1932	October 4, 2022	Singer-songwriter
	Roy Rogers	1988	November 5, 1911	July 6, 1998	Singer and celebrity. Only person inducted twice. Previously inducted with Sons of the Pioneers in 1980.
	Jack Stapp	1989	December 8, 1912	December 20, 1980	Music executive
	Cliffie Stone	1989	March 1, 1917	January 17, 1998	Music executive
	Hank Thompson	1989	September 3, 1925	November 6, 2007	Singer-songwriter

== 1990s ==
Inductees in the 1990s
Image	Inductee	Year	Birth date	Death date	Notes
	Tennessee Ernie Ford	1990	February 13, 1919	October 17, 1991	Singer, cross-genre personality
	Felice and Boudleaux Bryant	1991	Boudleaux (February 13, 1920); Felice (August 7, 1925)	Boudleaux (June 25, 1987); Felice (April 22, 2003)	Songwriters
	George Jones	1992	September 12, 1931	April 26, 2013	Singer-songwriter
	Frances Preston	1992	August 27, 1934	June 13, 2012	Music executive
	Willie Nelson	1993	April 29, 1933	–	Singer-songwriter, actor
	Merle Haggard	1994	April 6, 1937	April 6, 2016	Singer-songwriter
	Roger Miller	1995	January 2, 1936	October 25, 1992	Singer-Songwriter and Cross-genre personality
	Jo Walker-Meador	1995	February 16, 1924	August 16, 2017	Music executive
	Patsy Montana	1996	October 30, 1908	May 3, 1996	Singer
	Buck Owens	1996	August 12, 1929	March 25, 2006	Singer-Songwriter, TV Personality
	Ray Price	1996	January 12, 1926	December 16, 2013	Singer
	Harlan Howard	1997	September 8, 1927	March 3, 2002	Songwriter
	Brenda Lee	1997	December 11, 1944	–	Singer and cross-genre personality
	Cindy Walker	1997	July 20, 1918	March 23, 2006	Songwriter
	George Morgan	1998	June 28, 1924	July 7, 1975	Singer
	Elvis Presley	1998	January 8, 1935	August 16, 1977	Singer and cross-genre personality
	E.W. "Bud" Wendell	1998	August 17, 1927	–	Music executive
	Tammy Wynette	1998	May 5, 1942	April 6, 1998	Singer-Songwriter
	Johnny Bond	1999	June 1, 1915	June 12, 1978	Singer-songwriter, comedian, actor, Radio Personality, author
	Dolly Parton	1999	January 19, 1946	August 25, 2026	Singer-songwriter, cross-genre personality, businesswoman, TV personality, author, philanthropist, and actress
	Conway Twitty	1999	September 1, 1933	June 5, 1993	Singer-songwriter

== 2000s ==
Inductees in the 2000s
Image	Inductee	Year	Birth date	Death date	Notes
	Charley Pride	2000	March 18, 1934	December 12, 2020	Singer
	Faron Young	2000	February 25, 1932	December 10, 1996	Singer
	Bill Anderson	2001	November 1, 1937	–	Singer-songwriter
	The Delmore Brothers	2001	Alton (December 25, 1908); Rabon (December 3, 1916)	Alton (June 9, 1964); Rabon (December 4, 1952)	Singers
	The Everly Brothers	2001	Don (February 1, 1937); Phil (January 19, 1939)	Don (August 21, 2021); Phil (January 3, 2014)	Singers and cross-genre personalities
	Don Gibson	2001	April 3, 1928	November 17, 2003	Singer-songwriter
	Homer and Jethro	2001	Henry D. "Homer" Haynes (July 27, 1920); Kenneth C. "Jethro" Burns (March 10, 1920)	Homer (August 7, 1971); Jethro (February 4, 1989)	Singers and comedians
	Waylon Jennings	2001	June 15, 1937	February 13, 2002	Singer-songwriter and outlaw country pioneer
	The Jordanaires	2001	Gordon Stoker (August 3, 1924); Neal Matthews Jr. (October 26, 1929); Hoyt Hawkins (March 31, 1927); Ray Walker (March 16, 1934)	Stoker (March 27, 2013); Matthews (April 21, 2000); Hawkins (October 27, 1982)	Singers and backing vocalists
	Don Law	2001	February 24, 1902	December 20, 1982	Music executive. Last non-American born inductee.
	The Louvin Brothers	2001	Ira Louvin (April 21, 1924); Charlie Louvin (July 7, 1927)	Ira (June 20, 1965); Charlie (January 26, 2011)	Singers and songwriters
	Ken Nelson	2001	January 19, 1911	January 6, 2008	Record producer
	Sam Phillips	2001	January 5, 1923	July 30, 2003	Record producer
	Webb Pierce	2001	August 8, 1921	February 24, 1991	Singer-Songwriter
	Bill Carlisle	2002	December 19, 1908	March 17, 2003	Singer
	Porter Wagoner	2002	August 12, 1927	October 28, 2007	Singer-songwriter and TV personality
	Floyd Cramer	2003	October 27, 1933	December 31, 1997	Musician
	Carl Smith	2003	March 15, 1927	January 16, 2010	Singer
	Jim Foglesong	2004	July 26, 1922	July 9, 2013	Music executive
	Kris Kristofferson	2004	June 22, 1936	September 28, 2024	Singer-songwriter, actor
	Alabama	2005	Randy Owen (December 13, 1949); Jeff Cook (August 27, 1949); Teddy Gentry (January 22, 1952); Mark Herndon (May 11, 1955)	Jeff Cook (November 7, 2022)	Band
	DeFord Bailey	2005	December 14, 1899	July 2, 1982	Musician
	Glen Campbell	2005	April 22, 1936	August 8, 2017	Singer, musician, actor, and television host.
	Harold Bradley	2006	January 2, 1926	January 31, 2019	Musician
	Sonny James	2006	May 1, 1928	February 22, 2016	Singer-songwriter
	George Strait	2006	May 18, 1952	–	Singer
	Ralph Emery	2007	March 10, 1933	January 15, 2022	Radio and TV personality
	Vince Gill	2007	April 12, 1957	–	Singer-songwriter and musician
	Mel Tillis	2007	August 8, 1932	November 19, 2017	Singer-songwriter
	Tom T. Hall	2008	May 25, 1936	August 20, 2021	Singer-songwriter
	Emmylou Harris	2008	April 2, 1947	–	Singer-songwriter
	The Statler Brothers	2008	Harold Reid (August 21, 1939); Don Reid (June 5, 1945); Phil Balsley (August 8, 1939); Lew DeWitt (March 12, 1938); Jimmy Fortune (March 11, 1955)	DeWitt (August 15, 1990); Harold Reid (April 24, 2020)	Vocal Group
	Ernest Stoneman	2008	May 25, 1893	June 14, 1968	Singer, songwriter, and musician
	Roy Clark	2009	April 15, 1933	November 15, 2018	Singer, musician, and TV personality
	Barbara Mandrell	2009	December 25, 1948	–	Singer, musician, TV personality
	Charlie McCoy	2009	March 28, 1941	–	Musician

== 2010s ==
Inductees in the 2010s
Image	Inductee	Year	Birth date	Death date	Notes
	Jimmy Dean	2010	August 10, 1928	June 13, 2010	Singer, actor, business owner, and TV personality
	Ferlin Husky	2010	December 3, 1925	March 17, 2011	Singer and songwriter
	Billy Sherrill	2010	November 5, 1936	August 4, 2015	Record producer and songwriter
	Don Williams	2010	May 27, 1939	September 8, 2017	Singer-songwriter
	Bobby Braddock	2011	August 5, 1940	–	Songwriter, record producer
	Reba McEntire	2011	March 28, 1955	–	Singer, actress
	Jean Shepard	2011	November 21, 1933	September 25, 2016	Singer
	Garth Brooks	2012	February 7, 1962	–	Singer and songwriter
	Hargus "Pig" Robbins	2012	January 18, 1938	January 30, 2022	Musician
	Connie Smith	2012	August 14, 1941	–	Singer
	Kenny Rogers	2013	August 21, 1938	March 20, 2020	Singer, songwriter, actor, and cross-genre personality
	Bobby Bare	2013	April 7, 1935	–	Singer and songwriter
	"Cowboy" Jack Clement	2013	April 5, 1931	August 8, 2013	Musician, songwriter, and record producer
	Hank Cochran	2014	August 2, 1935	July 15, 2010	Singer and songwriter
	Mac Wiseman	2014	May 23, 1925	February 24, 2019	Singer, songwriter, radio personality, record producer, and guitarist
	Ronnie Milsap	2014	January 16, 1943	–	Singer and pianist
	Jim Ed Brown and The Browns	2015	Jim Ed Brown (April 1, 1934); Maxine Brown (April 27, 1931); Bonnie Brown (July 31, 1938)	June 11, 2015; January 21, 2019; July 16, 2016	Singer, TV presenter, and radio personality (Jim Ed); Vocal group (The Browns). Jim Ed Brown was inducted in early June due to declining health and shortly before his death.
	The Oak Ridge Boys	2015	Duane Allen (April 29, 1943); Joe Bonsall (May 18, 1948); William Lee Golden (January 12, 1939); Richard Sterban (April 24, 1943)	Joe Bonsall (July 9, 2024), Richard Sterban (November 14, 2026)	Vocal group. The Oak Ridge Boys have had multiple members during their existence; the current members were the ones so honored.
	Grady Martin	2015	January 17, 1929	December 3, 2001	Musician
	Fred Foster	2016	July 26, 1931	February 20, 2019	Record producer and music executive
	Charlie Daniels	2016	October 28, 1936	July 6, 2020	Singer, songwriter, and musician
	Randy Travis	2016	May 4, 1959	–	Singer and songwriter
	Alan Jackson	2017	October 17, 1958	–	Singer and songwriter
	Jerry Reed	2017	March 20, 1937	September 1, 2008	Singer, songwriter, actor, and musician
	Don Schlitz	2017	August 29, 1952	April 16, 2026	Songwriter
	Ricky Skaggs	2018	July 18, 1954	–	Singer, songwriter, and musician
	Dottie West	2018	October 11, 1932	September 4, 1991	Singer, songwriter, actress, and musician
	Johnny Gimble	2018	May 30, 1926	May 9, 2015	Musician (fiddle)
	Brooks & Dunn	2019	Ronnie Dunn (June 1, 1953); Kix Brooks (May 12, 1955)	– –	Singer-songwriters, musicians (Kix Brooks, Ronnie Dunn); Radio personality (Kix Brooks)
	Ray Stevens	2019	January 24, 1939	–	Singer-songwriter, musician, record producer, music arranger, comedian, and TV/video personality
	Jerry Bradley	2019	January 30, 1940	July 17, 2023	Record producer, record label executive

== 2020s ==
Inductees in the 2020s
Image	Inductee	Year	Birth date	Death date	Notes
	Dean Dillon	2020	March 26, 1955	–	Songwriter
	Marty Stuart	2020	September 30, 1958	–	Singer, songwriter, musician, television host, and country music historian
	Hank Williams Jr.	2020	May 26, 1949	–	Singer-songwriter and musician
	Eddie Bayers	2021	January 28, 1949	–	Drummer
	Pete Drake	2021	October 8, 1932	July 29, 1988	Steel guitarist
	The Judds	2021	Wynonna Judd (May 30, 1964); Naomi Judd (January 11, 1946)	Naomi Judd (April 30, 2022)	Vocal duo
	Ray Charles	2021	September 23, 1930	June 10, 2004	Singer-songwriter, pianist, composer, and cross-genre personality
	Joe Galante	2022	December 18, 1949	–	Record label executive
	Keith Whitley	2022	July 1, 1954	May 9, 1989	Singer-songwriter
	Jerry Lee Lewis	2022	September 29, 1935	October 28, 2022	Singer-songwriter, pianist and cross-genre personality
	Bob McDill	2023	April 4, 1944	–	Songwriter
	Patty Loveless	2023	January 4, 1957	–	Singer
	Tanya Tucker	2023	October 10, 1958	–	Singer-songwriter
	James Burton	2024	August 21, 1939	–	Guitarist
	John Anderson	2024	December 13, 1954	October 21, 2026	Singer-songwriter
	Toby Keith	2024	July 8, 1961	February 5, 2024	Singer-songwriter
	Tony Brown	2025	December 11, 1946	–	Producer, pianist, executive
	June Carter Cash	2025	June 23, 1929	May 15, 2003	Singer-songwriter, comedienne, actress, author, dancer, philanthropist, humanitarian
	Kenny Chesney	2025	March 26, 1968	–	Singer
	Paul Overstreet	2026	March 17, 1955	–	Songwriter
	The Stanley Brothers	2026	Carter Stanley (August 25, 1925); Ralph Stanley (February 25, 1927)	Carter Stanley (December 1, 1966); Ralph Stanley (June 23, 2016)	Bluegrass duo
	Tim McGraw	2026	May 1, 1967	–	Singer, actor

== Also in the Rock Hall of Fame ==
As of 2024, there are 18 members of the Country Music Hall of Fame also inducted into the Rock and Roll Hall of Fame.

Inductee	Year inducted into Country Music Hall of Fame	Year inducted into Rock Hall of Fame	Notes
Jimmie Rodgers	1961	1986 - early influencer	Only person inducted into both Halls of Fame inaugural classes
Hank Williams	1961	1987 - early influencer	
Bob Wills	1968	1999 - early influencer	
Bill Monroe	1970	1997 - early influencer	
Chet Atkins	1973	2002 - sideman	
Johnny Cash	1980	1992	
Willie Nelson	1993	2023	
Brenda Lee	1997	2002	
Elvis Presley	1998	1986	
Dolly Parton	1999	2022	
The Everly Brothers	2001	1986	Only vocal duo or group in both Halls of Fame
Sam Phillips	2001 - non-performer	1986 - non-performer	Only non-performer in both Halls of Fame
Floyd Cramer	2003 - musician	2003 - sideman	Only person inducted into both Halls of Fame in the same year.
Johnny Gimble	2018 - musician (fiddle)	1999 - early influencer with Bob Willis	
Ray Charles	2021	1986	
Jerry Lee Lewis	2022	1986	
James Burton	2024	2001	

== See also ==
- Grand Ole Opry
- National Recording Registry
