= 1979 Country Music Association Awards =

Annual US music awards ceremony

- Date: October 8, 1979
- Location: Grand Ole Opry House, Nashville, Tennessee
- Hosted by: Kenny Rogers
- Most wins: Kenny Rogers (3)
- Most nominations: Kenny Rogers (5)

Television/radio coverage
- Network: CBS

The 1979 Country Music Association Awards, 13th Ceremony, was held on October 8, 1979, at the Grand Ole Opry House, Nashville, Tennessee, and was hosted by CMA Award winner Kenny Rogers.

== Winners and nominees ==
Winners in Bold.

| Entertainer of the Year | Album of the Year |
|---|---|
| **Willie Nelson**; Crystal Gayle; Barbara Mandrell; Kenny Rogers; Statler Brothers | **The Gambler — Kenny Rogers**; Armed and Crazy — Johnny Paycheck; One for The Road — Willie Nelson and Leon Russell; Rose Colored Glasses — John Conlee; The Originals — Statler Brothers |
| Male Vocalist of the Year | Female Vocalist of the Year |
| **Kenny Rogers**; John Conlee; Larry Gatlin; Willie Nelson; Don Williams | **Barbara Mandrell**; Janie Fricke; Crystal Gayle; Emmylou Harris; Anne Murray |
| Vocal Group of the Year | Vocal Duo of the Year |
| **The Statler Brothers**; Charlie Daniels Band; Dave & Sugar; The Kendalls; The Oak Ridge Boys | **Kenny Rogers and Dottie West**; Conway Twitty and Loretta Lynn; Jim Ed Brown and Helen Cornelius; Johnny Duncan and Janie Fricke; Waylon Jennings and Willie Nelson |
| Single of the Year | Song of the Year |
| **"The Devil Went Down To Georgia" — Charlie Daniels Band**; "Amanda" — Waylon Jennings; "If Loving You Is Wrong I Don't Want To Be Right" — Barbara Mandrell; "The Gambler" — Kenny Rogers; "You Needed Me" — Anne Murray | **"The Gambler" — Don Schlitz**; "Amanda" — Bob McDill; "Every Which Way But Loose" — Milton Brown, Steven Dorff and Thomas Garrett; "She Believes In Me" — Steve Gibb; "Talking In Your Sleep" — Bobby R. Woods and Roger Cook |
| Instrumental Group of the Year | Instrumentalist of the Year |
| **Charlie Daniels Band**; Asleep At the Wheel; Danny Davis & The Nashville Brass; Gatlin Family & Friends; Chet Atkins and Les Paul | **Charlie Daniels**; Chet Atkins; Roy Clark; Buddy Emmons; Charlie McCoy |

== Country Music Hall of Fame ==
- Hubert Long
- Hank Snow
