= Lula Naff =

American theatre manager (1875–1960)

Lula Clay Naff (March 1, 1875 – March 4, 1960) was an American theatre manager and the first woman general manager of the Ryman Auditorium. Naff is notable for her contribution to the business and music scene in Nashville, Tennessee at a time where women were scarcely represented in business management positions and unable to vote in the same.

== Biography ==
Lula Clay was born in Fall Branch, Tennessee on March 1, 1875. Her father was a circuit court clerk and hotel operator. At age 12, she moved with her family to nearby Johnson City. She married George Eakin Naff. When Naff was 25, her husband died. After his death, she adopted a daughter. She went to business school and learned to be a stenographer and secretary to support her daughter. Naff secured a role with the Delong Rice Lyceum Bureau, a talent agency. Naff moved to Nashville when the Delong Rice Lyceum Bureau relocated to the city and began working with the Ryman Auditorium. Naff first visited the Ryman theater in 1904, to watch Italian opera singer Adelina Patti.

In 1913, the talent agency Naff was working with went out of business. Without a job, Naff asked the board of directors at the Ryman Auditorium if she could book the venue for her own events. The board agreed, and Naff began to book talent for the venue.

In 1920, Naff was hired as the general manager of the Ryman Auditorium, after the company changed leadership. Naff would manage the venue for the next 35 years, booking acts including Bob Hope, Harry Houdini and Will Rogers.Naff would go to New York City to lobby for shows and used newspapers to advertise Ryman's productions. In 1943, Naff brought the Grand Ole Opry radio show to the theatre. The Opry would remain at the Ryman Theater for the next 31 years.

In her role as general manager, Naff went by L.C. Naff in an attempt to avoid gender discrimination. During her leadership of the venue, women could not get obtain credit in their own name, could not own property or got a loan. It was not considered proper for women in Nashville at the time to be involved in business. Despite these difficulties, Naff managed the venue to success, retiring from her role as general manager of the Ryman on September 1, 1955, when she was 80-years-old. Naff considered the Ryman as her "child" and was known for her strong devotion to the theater, her thriftiness, and difficult reputation. Naff described herself as "an unreconstructed rebel" and was a proud member of the United Daughters of the Confederacy and the Order of the Eastern Star.

On March 4, 1960, Naff died at her home in Nashville, three days after her 85th birthday.

=== Legacy ===
Academics have cited Naff's role and contribution to the growth of country music through her leadership at the Ryman, programming and network of musical artists. In 2015, the Ryman Auditorium opened Cafe Lula, in Naff's honor as part of a $14million refurbishment project. In 2017, Naff was named to the Music City Walk of Fame for her contributions to Nashville's music scene. That year, she was posthumously honored with the Lula Naff Ryman Trailblazer Award by the Nashville Business Journal.
