= Music City Walk of Fame =

Walk of fame honoring contributors to Nashville's music heritage

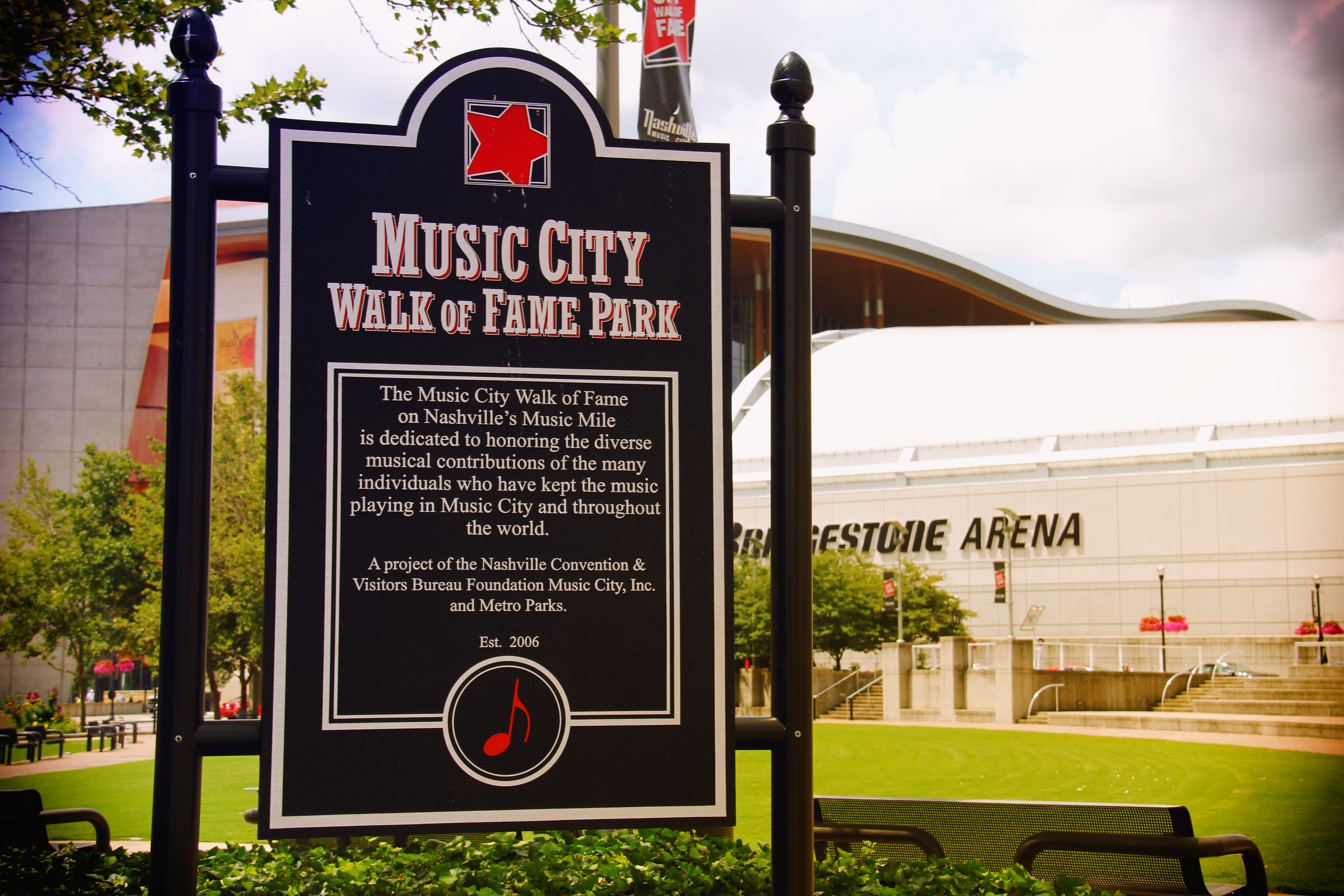
A Music City Walk of Fame Park sign, Nashville

The Music City Walk of Fame in downtown Nashville is a walk of fame that honors significant contributors to Nashville's musical heritage and significant achievements in the music industry.

Each honoree is commemorated with a large stainless steel and terrazzo star embedded in the sidewalk in Walk of Fame Park between the Country Music Hall of Fame, Bridgestone Arena, and Schermerhorn Symphony Center.

The walk was established in 2006 by the Nashville Convention and Visitors Bureau. Gibson Guitars is a founding sponsor. A new plaque design was revealed with the induction of artists Jack White and Loretta Lynn in 2015.

== Inductees ==
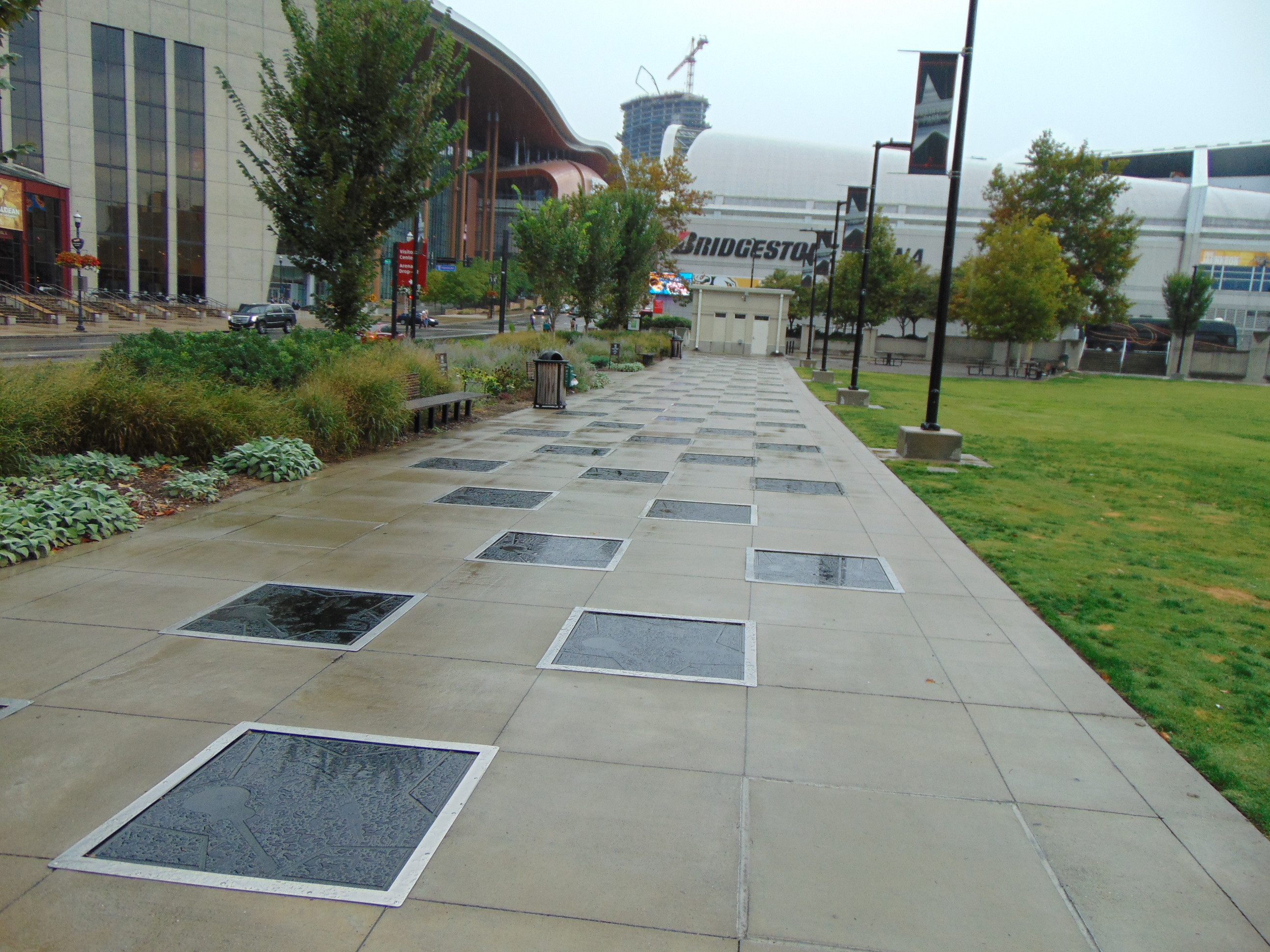
The Music City Walk of Fame at the Walk of Fame Park in downtown Nashville, with the Country Music Hall of Fame and Museum on the left and the Bridgestone Arena in the background

Honorees are inducted twice annually, in the spring and fall.

- November 2006 inductees:
  - Reba McEntire
  - Ronnie Milsap
  - Kenneth Schermerhorn (inducted posthumously)
  - The Fisk Jubilee Singers
  - Boudleaux and Felice Bryant (posthumous for both)
  - Roy Orbison (inducted posthumously)
- April 2007 inductees:
  - The Crickets
  - Emmylou Harris
  - John Hiatt
  - Wynonna Judd
  - Frances W. Preston
  - Michael W. Smith
- November 2007 inductees:
  - Rodney Crowell
  - Bob DiPiero
  - Vince Gill
  - Jimi Hendrix (inducted posthumously)
  - Buddy Killen (inducted posthumously)
  - Barbara Mandrell
- April 2008 inductees:
  - Steven Curtis Chapman
  - Merle Kilgore (inducted posthumously)
  - Nitty Gritty Dirt Band
  - Steve Wariner
  - Kirk Whalum
  - Hank Williams Sr. (inducted posthumously)
- November 2008, inductees:
  - Martina McBride
  - Randy Travis
  - Little Richard
  - Jo Walker-Meador
  - Trace Adkins
  - Elvis Presley (inducted posthumously)
  - Michael McDonald
- April 2009 inductees:
  - Marty Stuart
  - Josh Turner
  - Cowboy Jack Clement
  - Mike Curb
  - CeCe Winans
  - Dr. R. H. Boyd (inducted posthumously)
  - November 2009 inductees:
  - Kid Rock
  - Ernest Tubb (inducted posthumously)
  - Tootsie Bess (inducted posthumously)
  - Charlie Daniels
  - Dolly Parton
- November 2010 inductees:
  - Eddy Arnold (inducted posthumously)
  - Little Jimmy Dickens
  - Rascal Flatts
  - Bobby Hebb (inducted posthumously)
  - Kris Kristofferson
  - Mel Tillis
- May 2011 inductees:
  - Bill Anderson
  - Keith Urban
- October 2011 inductee:
  - Peter Frampton
- November 2011 inductees:
  - Manuel
  - Dan Miller (inducted posthumously)
  - Dr. Bobby Jones
  - Dottie Rambo
  - Les Paul (inducted posthumously)
  - Alan Jackson
  - Kix Brooks
- June 2012 inductees:
  - Bob Babbitt
  - Steve Winwood
- September 2012 inductees:
  - Kings of Leon
- June 2015 inductees:
  - Jack White
  - Loretta Lynn
- September 2015 inductees:
  - Garth Brooks
  - Karl Dean
  - Trisha Yearwood
- October 2015 inductees:
  - Johnny Cash (inducted posthumously)
  - Steve Cropper
  - Miranda Lambert
  - Bud Wendell
- May 2016 inductees:
  - Alabama
  - Sam Moore
- October 2016 inductees:
  - Faith Hill
  - Tim McGraw
- April 2017 inductees:
  - Amy Grant
  - Martha Ingram
- September 2017 inductees:
  - Little Big Town
  - Lula C. Naff
  - Tom Ryman
- October 2017 inductee:
  - Kenny Rogers
- August 2018 inductees:
  - Ben Folds
  - Brenda Lee
  - Jeannie Seely
  - Ray Stevens
- October 2019 inductees:
  - Lady Antebellum
  - Clint Black
  - Mac McAnally
  - Chet Atkins (inducted posthumously)
  - DeFord Bailey (inducted posthumously)
- April 2022 inductees:
  - Dierks Bentley
  - Keb' Mo'
  - Bobby Bare
  - Connie Smith
- October 2022 inductees:
  - John Prine (inducted posthumously)
  - Patsy Cline (inducted posthumously)
  - Paul T. Kwami (inducted posthumously)
  - Ed Hardy (inducted posthumously)
- May 2023 inductees:
  - Eric Church
  - Butch Spyridon
  - Linda Chambers & Joe Chambers
- October 2023 inductees:
  - Darius Rucker
  - Don McLean
  - Duane Eddy
  - Joe Galante
- October 2024 inductees:
  - Jimmy Buffett (inducted posthumously)
  - The Fairfield Four
  - Colin Reed
  - Bill Cody
- March 2025 inductee:
  - Luke Combs
- November 2025 inductee:
  - Old Dominion
  - Charley Pride (inducted posthumously)
  - Liz Rose

== See also ==
- StarWalk
- List of music museums
