= Country Music Association =

American music industry organization

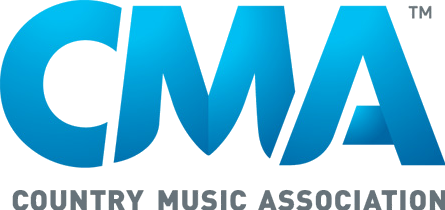
- Abbreviation: CMA
- Formation: 1958; 68 years ago
- Type: Music organization
- Headquarters: Nashville, Tennessee, U.S.
- CEO: Sarah Trahern
- Website: cmaworld.com

The Country Music Association (CMA) is an American trade association with the stated aim of promoting and developing country music throughout the world. Founded in 1958 in Nashville, Tennessee, it originally consisted of 233 members and was the first trade organization formed to promote a music genre. The CMA is best known for its annual CMA Fest and Country Music Association Awards broadcast live on network television each fall (usually October or November).

== About ==
Initially, CMA's Board of Directors included nine directors and five officers. Wesley Rose, president of Acuff-Rose Publishing, Inc., served as CMA's first chairman of the board. Broadcasting entrepreneur and executive Connie B. Gay was the founding president. Mac Wiseman served as its first secretary and was also the CMA's last surviving inaugural member. The CMA was founded, in part, because of widespread dismay on Music Row about the rise of rock and roll and its influence on country music.

Originally there were nine individual membership categories. The current 15 categories represent all facets of the music industry. Organizational memberships are also available. CMA membership is composed of those persons or organizations that are involved in Country Music, directly and substantially.

Harry Stone served as the first executive director from 1958 to 1960 before resigning. Jo Walker-Meador, the first full-time employee of the CMA, replaced Stone as executive director in 1962 and served until 1991.

The first CMA Awards ceremony was held in 1967 in Nashville. Sonny James and Bobbie Gentry hosted the event, which was not televised. The winner of the first "Entertainer of the Year" award was singer Eddy Arnold. "Male Vocalist of the Year" went to Jack Greene and "Female Vocalist of the Year" to Loretta Lynn.

In 1968, Roy Rogers and Dale Evans hosted the awards, which were presented at the Ryman Auditorium in Nashville. (The ceremony was filmed and televised on NBC a few weeks later.) The first live telecast of the show was in 1969.

Annual awards are given in the following twelve categories: Entertainer of the Year, Male Vocalist, Female Vocalist, New Artist of the Year (formerly the Horizon Award), Vocal Group, Vocal Duo, Single, Album, Song, Music Event, Music Video, and Musician.

The CMA also gives a "CMA Broadcast Award" to country-formatted radio stations each year. Broadcast Awards are segmented based on market size, major market (Arbitron Ranking 1–25), large market (Arbitron Ranking 26–50), medium market (Arbitron Ranking 51–100), and small market (All other Markets). A single station cannot win the award in consecutive years.

In honor of the CMA Awards 50th anniversary, MCA Nashville released a song called "Forever Country".

In 2017, days before the 51st Annual Country Music Association Awards, the association announced that reporters that covered “the Las Vegas tragedy, gun rights, political affiliations or topics of the like” at the awards show would have their credentials revoked. Following criticism from Brad Paisley, journalists, and others, the association apologized and rescinded the restrictions on the press.

In June 2021, the CMA announced that they would extend its broadcast contract with ABC through 2026.

== Events ==
The cornerstone of the CMA is "Country Music's Biggest Week", which includes the aforementioned CMA Awards in early November.

=== CMA Country Christmas ===
CMA Country Christmas is a holiday concert event featuring holiday songs performed by country artists. The concert is usually not aired live, as it is re-edited for later broadcast by CMA broadcast partner ABC.

=== CMA Fest ===
The CMA Fest, the longest-running Country Music festival in the world, takes place in downtown Nashville, TN every summer. Hundreds of thousands of fans flock to listen to hundreds of artists perform on 11+ stages. All day long fans have a chance to meet their favorite country music artists at Fan Fair X. The four days of events are later re-edited into a three-hour TV special, also aired on ABC during the summer months.

== See also ==
- Academy of Country Music – a separate organization from the CMA
- Academy of Country Music Awards
- CMT – Country Music Television, owned by Viacom Media Network
- Grand Ole Opry
