= Jo Walker-Meador =

American music executive

- Born: Edith Josephine Denning; February 16, 1924; Orlinda, Tennessee, US
- Died: August 16, 2017 (aged 93); Nashville, Tennessee, US
- Years active: 1941–1991
- Known for: Executive Director Country Music Association 1962-91
- Spouse(s): Charles Walker (m. 1954; died 1967) Bob Meador (m. 1981; died 2015)
- Children: 3
- Awards: Country Music Hall of Fame, 1995

Jo Walker-Meador (February 16, 1924 – August 16, 2017) was an American music executive who served as Executive Director of the Country Music Association (CMA) from 1962 to 1991. During her tenure, she created the first Country Music Hall of Fame and Museum, which opened near Music Row and ran from 1967 to 2000, developed the Country Music Association Awards (CMA Awards), which first ran in 1967, and launched Fan Fair (now the CMA Music Festival) in 1972. In 1995, Walker-Meador was inducted into the Country Music Hall of Fame.

== Early years ==
Born Edith Josephine Denning in Orlinda, Tennessee as one of eleven children on a family farm, her goal was to become a high school teacher and basketball coach, given she played the sport in high school. Because of the Great Depression and World War II, Denning had to get a job and save money to go to college. During World War II, she worked in the salvage department at the Vultee Aircraft plant in Nashville during the day, while going to the Watkins Institute (now part of Belmont University) for night school to learn how to be a secretary. Denning later attended Peabody College in Nashville (now part of Vanderbilt University) and Lambuth College in Jackson, Tennessee (now part of the University of Memphis).

== Work with the CMA ==
When the CMA was formed in 1958, Denning (then known as Jo Walker) was hired as the first full-time employee to do secretarial duties for the first Executive Director Harry Stone, a former manager for WSM AM radio in Nashville. Stone stayed in the position of executive director until 1960. Prior to her hiring with the CMA, Walker had never visited the Grand Ole Opry.

In a meeting on who to replace Stone as CMA's executive director, CMA member and country comedian Minnie Pearl stated, "Jo's doing all the work. Why don't we just hire her?" (Walker was not in attendance at the meeting when Pearl made the comments.) Walker took the position in 1962.

In the late 1950s, there were only 81 full-time country music radio stations in the United States. Walker's efforts during her tenure was to increase the number of radio stations in the US, which increased to over 2,400 by the time of her retirement, when she was known as Jo Walker-Meador. Other country music-related items established under Walker during the 1960s were the first Country Music Hall of Fame and Museum, with a national fundraising drive that helped complete the physical museum in 1967 (the Hall of Fame itself was established six years earlier), and the creation of the CMA Awards in 1967. In 1972, she helped establish Fan Fair (now the CMA Music Festival) for country music fans worldwide to meet their favorite stars in Nashville.

When Walker-Meador retired in 1991, she was honored at a retirement banquet of more than 1,000 attendees that included future Country Music Hall of Fame inductees Garth Brooks (2012) and Brenda Lee (1997).

== Legacy ==
In 1994, the CMA established the Jo Walker-Meador Award in her honor. It would be given to individuals or organizations for supporting or advocating country music outside of the United States. She was inducted into the Country Music Hall of Fame the following year. Joining Walker-Meador in the Hall of Fame in 1995 was Roger Miller.

Other awards won by Walker-Meador include the City of Nashville Metronome Award in 1970, the Nashville Chamber of Commerce Board of Governors in 1977, the Academy of Country Music Jim Reeves Memorial Award (for establishing a CMA office in London) in 1983, and the first female President of the Board of Big Brothers in 1989. Walker-Meador was also inducted into the Music City Walk of Fame in 2008.

== Personal life ==
Walker-Meador was married twice. Her first marriage was to Charles Walker, and lasted from 1954 to Walker's death in 1967. That marriage would produce a daughter Michelle. The second marriage was to Bob Meador, and lasted from 1981 to Meador's death in 2015. Meador's marriage included two stepchildren, Rob and Karen.

Walker-Meador died of a stroke in Nashville on August 16, 2017.
