= Ryman Auditorium =

Historic performance venue in Nashville, Tennessee, USA

- "The Mother Church of Country Music" "The Birthplace of Bluegrass" "The Carnegie Hall of the South" "The Ryman"
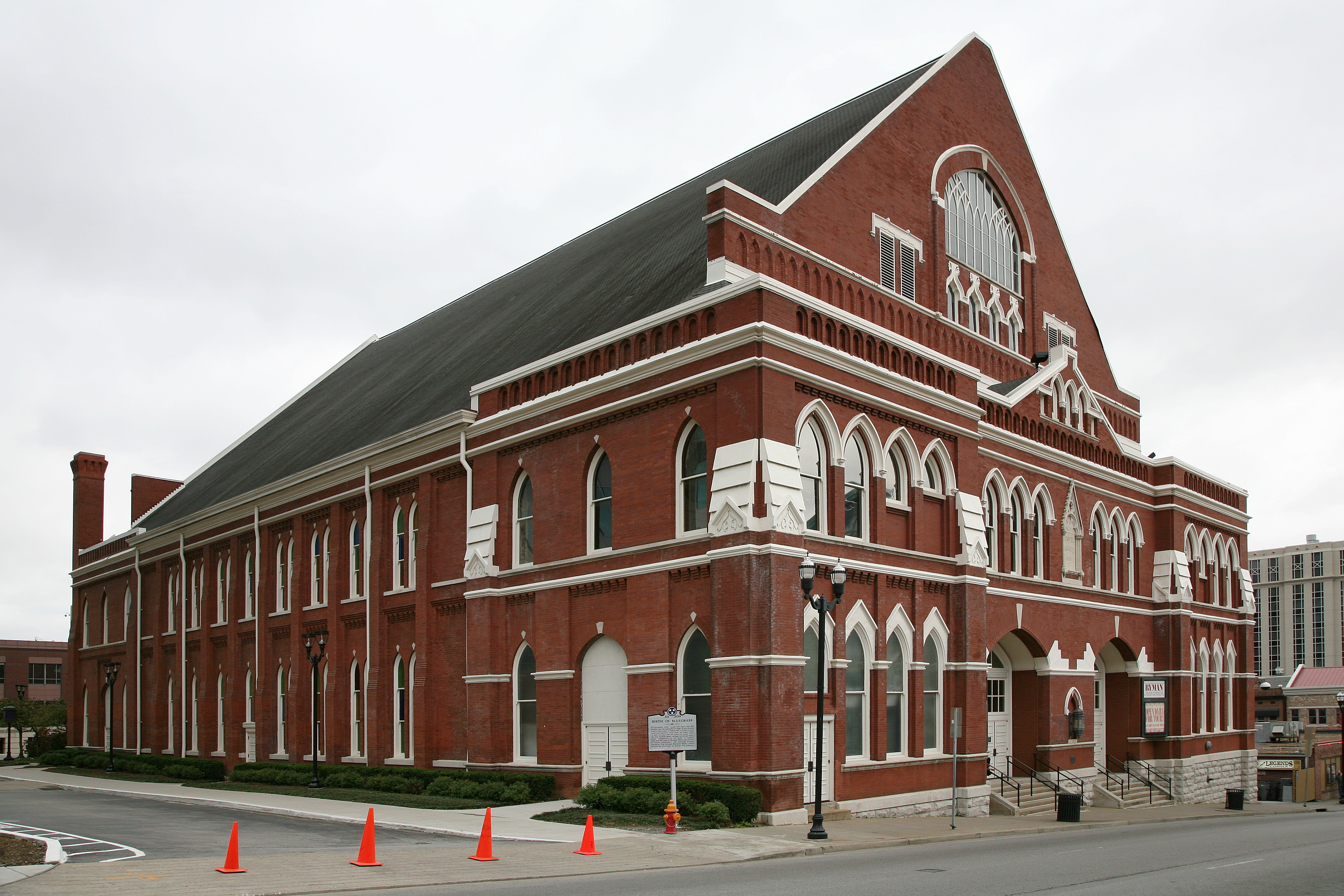
- Ryman Auditorium, facing Nashville's Rep. John Lewis Way North
- Interactive map of Ryman Auditorium
- Former names: Union Gospel Tabernacle (1892–1904); Grand Ole Opry House (1963–1974)
- Location: 116 Rep. John Lewis Way North; Nashville, Tennessee; 37219
- Coordinates: 36°9′40.6″N 86°46′42.6″W
- Owner: Ryman Hospitality Properties, Inc.
- Seating type: Pews
- Capacity: 2,362 (1994–present)
- Type: Concert hall Theatre; Broadcast venue

Construction
- Built: 1885–1892
- Opened: 1892
- Renovated: 1901, 1952, 1989, 1994, 2010
- Expanded: 1897, 1994, 2015
- Cost: US$100,000 (equivalent to $3,583,333 in 2025)

Website
- www.ryman.com

Ryman Auditorium (originally Union Gospel Tabernacle and renamed Grand Ole Opry House for a period) is a historic 2,362-seat live-performance venue and museum located at 116 Rep. John Lewis Way North, in the downtown core of Nashville, Tennessee, United States. It is best known as the home of the Grand Ole Opry from 1943 to 1974. It is owned and operated by Ryman Hospitality Properties, Inc. Ryman Auditorium was listed on the National Register of Historic Places in 1971 and was later designated as a National Historic Landmark on June 25, 2001, for its pivotal role in the popularization of country music. A storied stage for Rock & Roll artists for decades, the Ryman was named a Rock & Roll Hall of Fame Landmark in 2022.

== History ==
=== Union Gospel Tabernacle ===
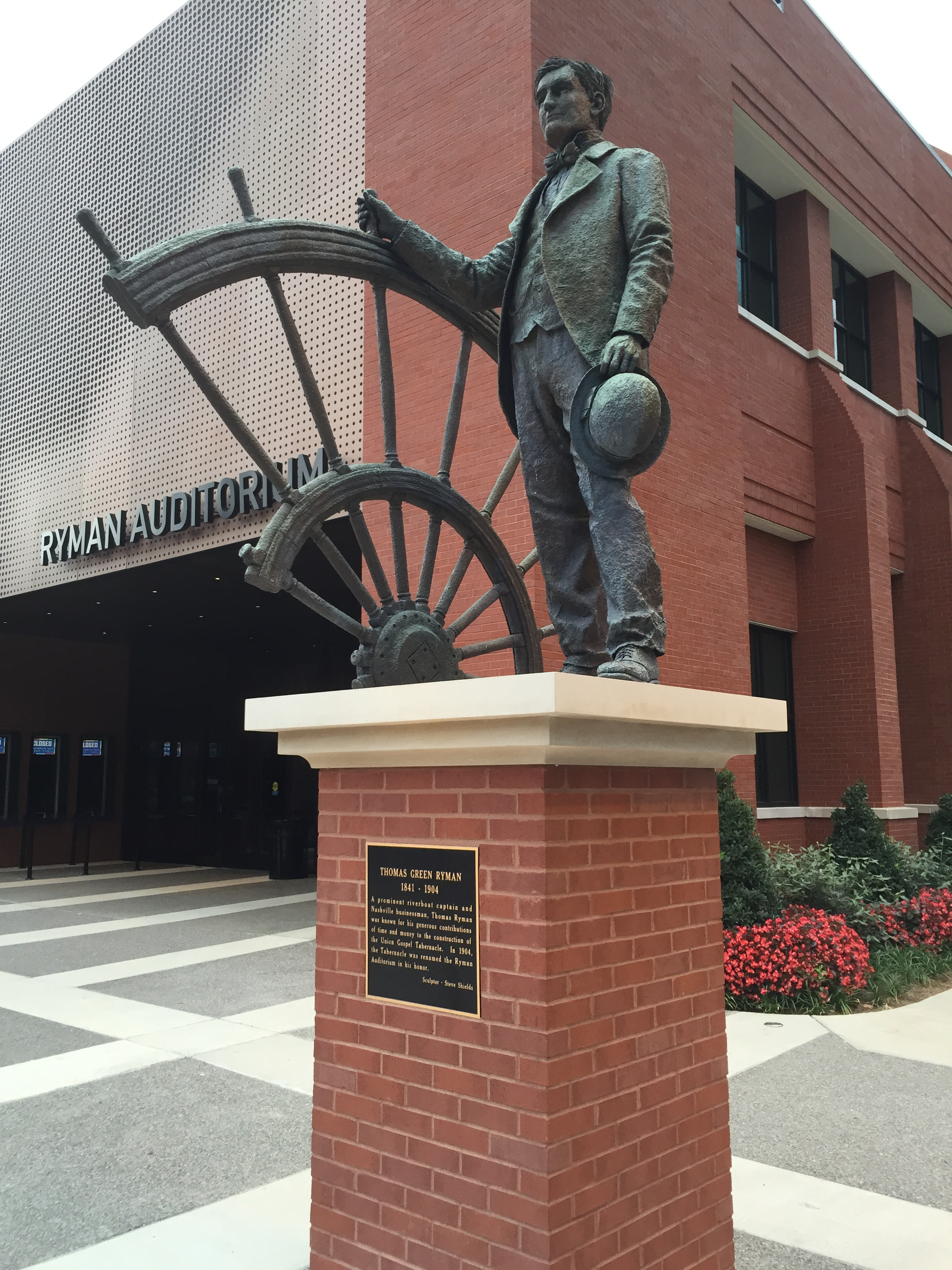
Statue of Thomas Ryman, outside the entrance to the auditorium which bears his name

The auditorium opened as the Union Gospel Tabernacle in 1892. Its construction was spearheaded by Thomas Ryman (1843–1904), a Nashville businessman who owned several saloons and a fleet of riverboats. Ryman conceived the idea of the auditorium as a tabernacle for the influential revivalist Samuel Porter Jones. He had attended one of Jones' 1885 tent revivals with the intent to heckle, but was instead converted into a devout Christian who pledged to build the tabernacle so the people of Nashville could attend large-scale revivals indoors. It took seven years to complete and cost US$100,000 (equivalent to $3,583,333 in 2025). Jones held his first revival at the site on May 25, 1890, when only the building's foundation and six-foot (1.8 m) walls had been completed.

Architect Hugh Cathcart Thompson designed the structure. Exceeding its construction budget, the tabernacle opened US$20,000 (equivalent to $716,667 in 2025) in debt. Jones sought to name the tabernacle in Ryman's honor, but Ryman denied the request several times. When Ryman died in 1904, his memorial service was held at the tabernacle, with Jones officiating. During the service, Jones proposed the building be renamed as Ryman Auditorium, which was met with the overwhelming approval of the attendees. Jones died less than two years later in 1906.

The building was originally designed to contain a balcony, but a lack of funds delayed its completion. The balcony was built and opened in time for the 1897 gathering of the United Confederate Veterans, with funds provided by members of the group. As a result, the balcony was once called the Confederate Gallery. Upon completion of the balcony, the Ryman's capacity rose to 6,000. In 2017, the "Confederate Gallery" plaque was removed and replaced with one that reads "1892 Ryman Auditorium." A stage was added in 1901 that reduced the capacity to just over 3,000.

=== Under the leadership of Lula C. Naff ===
Though the building was designed as a house of worship – a purpose it continued to serve throughout most of its early years – it was often leased to promoters for nonreligious events in an effort to pay off its debts and remain open. In 1904, Lula C. Naff, a widow and mother who was working as a stenographer, began to book and promote speaking engagements, concerts, boxing matches, and other attractions at the Ryman in her free time. In 1914, when her employer went out of business, Naff made booking these events her full-time job. She eventually transitioned into a role by 1920 as the Ryman's official manager. She preferred to use the name "L.C. Naff" in an attempt to avoid initial prejudices as a female executive in a male-dominated industry. Naff gained a reputation for battling local censorship groups, who had threatened to ban various performances deemed too risqué. In 1939, Naff won a landmark lawsuit against the Nashville Board of Censors, which was planning to arrest the star of the play Tobacco Road due to its provocative nature. The court declared the law creating the censors to be invalid.

Naff's ability to book stage shows and world-renowned entertainers in the city's largest indoor gathering place kept the Ryman at the forefront of Nashville's consciousness and enhanced the city's reputation as a cultural center for the performing arts, even as the building began to age. Harry Houdini in 1924, W.C. Fields, Will Rogers in 1925, Charlie Chaplin, Bob Hope with Doris Day in 1949, and John Philip Sousa (among others) performed at the venue over the years, earning the Ryman the nickname "The Carnegie Hall of the South". The Ryman also hosted lectures by U.S. presidents Theodore Roosevelt and William Howard Taft in 1907 and 1911, respectively. Italian opera singer Enrico Caruso appeared in concert there in 1919. It also hosted the inaugurations of three governors of the state of Tennessee.

The first event to sell out the Ryman was a lecture by Helen Keller and Anne Sullivan Macy in 1913. While being a trailblazer for working women, Naff also championed the cause of racial diversity. The building was used as a regular venue for the Fisk Jubilee Singers (they performed there in 1913) from nearby Fisk University, a historically black college. The state's Jim Crow laws required Ryman audiences to be segregated, with some shows designated for "White Audiences Only" and others for "Colored Audiences Only". But period photographs show that, in practice, Ryman audiences were often integrated. Naff retired in 1955 and died in 1960.

=== Grand Ole Opry ===
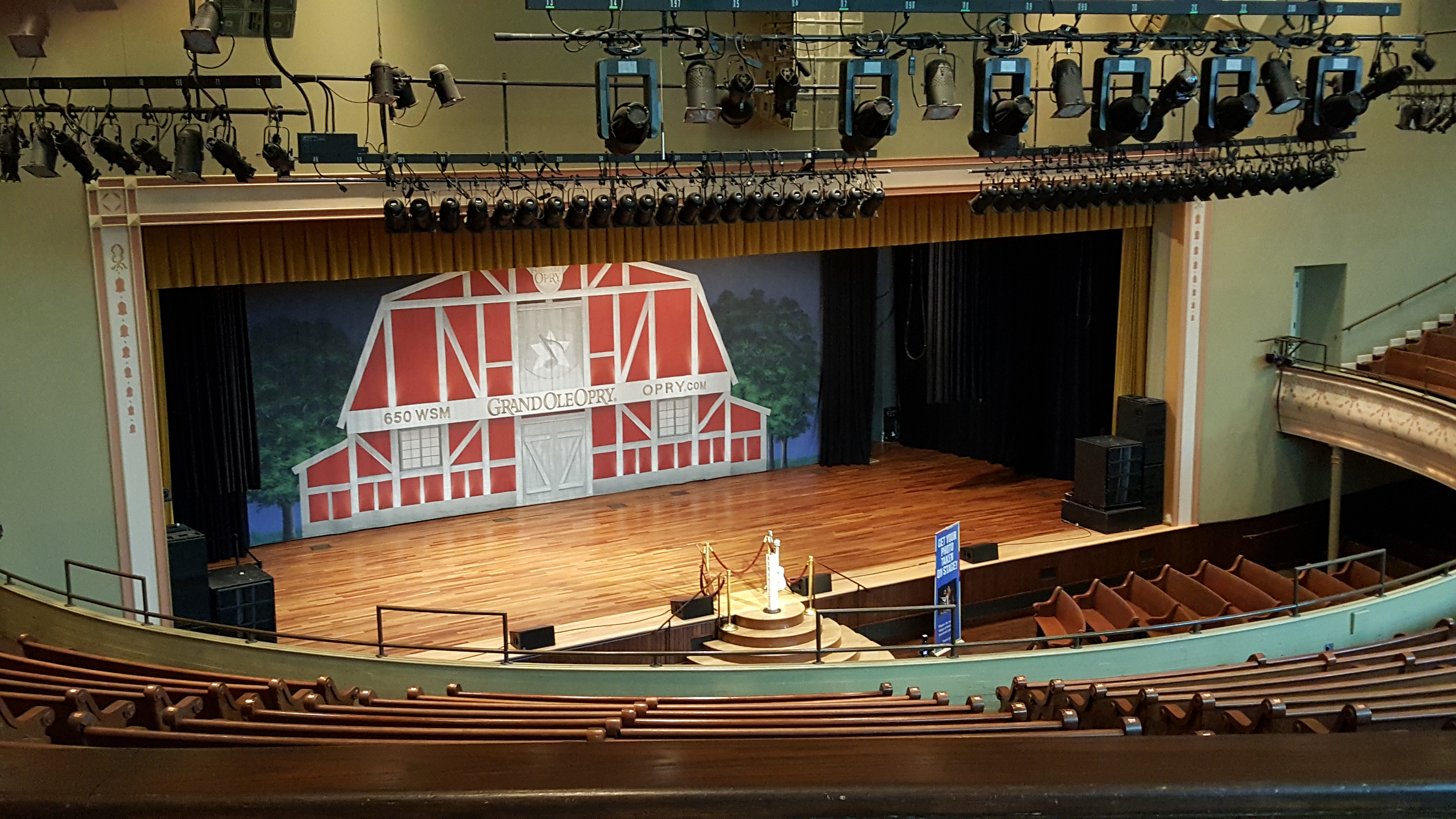
The stage at Ryman Auditorium where many legendary artists have performed

After debuting in 1925, the local country music radio program known as the Grand Ole Opry (originally called the WSM Barn Dance) became a Nashville institution. Broadcast over clear-channel AM radio station WSM, it could be heard in 30 states across the eastern part of the nation. Although not originally a stage show, the Opry began to attract listeners from around the region who would go to the WSM studio to see it live. When crowds got too large for the studio, in 1934 WSM began broadcasting the show from the Hillsboro Theatre (now Belcourt Theatre). The Opry moved to East Nashville's Dixie Tabernacle in 1936 and then to War Memorial Auditorium in 1939.

After four years – and several reports of upholstery damage caused by its rowdy crowds – the Opry was asked to leave War Memorial and sought a new home yet again. Because of the Ryman Auditorium's wooden pews and central location, Naff and other institution leaders thought the auditorium would be a perfect venue for such an audience. They began renting the venue to WSM for its shows. The Grand Ole Opry was first broadcast from the Ryman on June 5, 1943, and it originated there every week for nearly 31 years thereafter. Every show sold out, and hundreds of fans were often turned away.

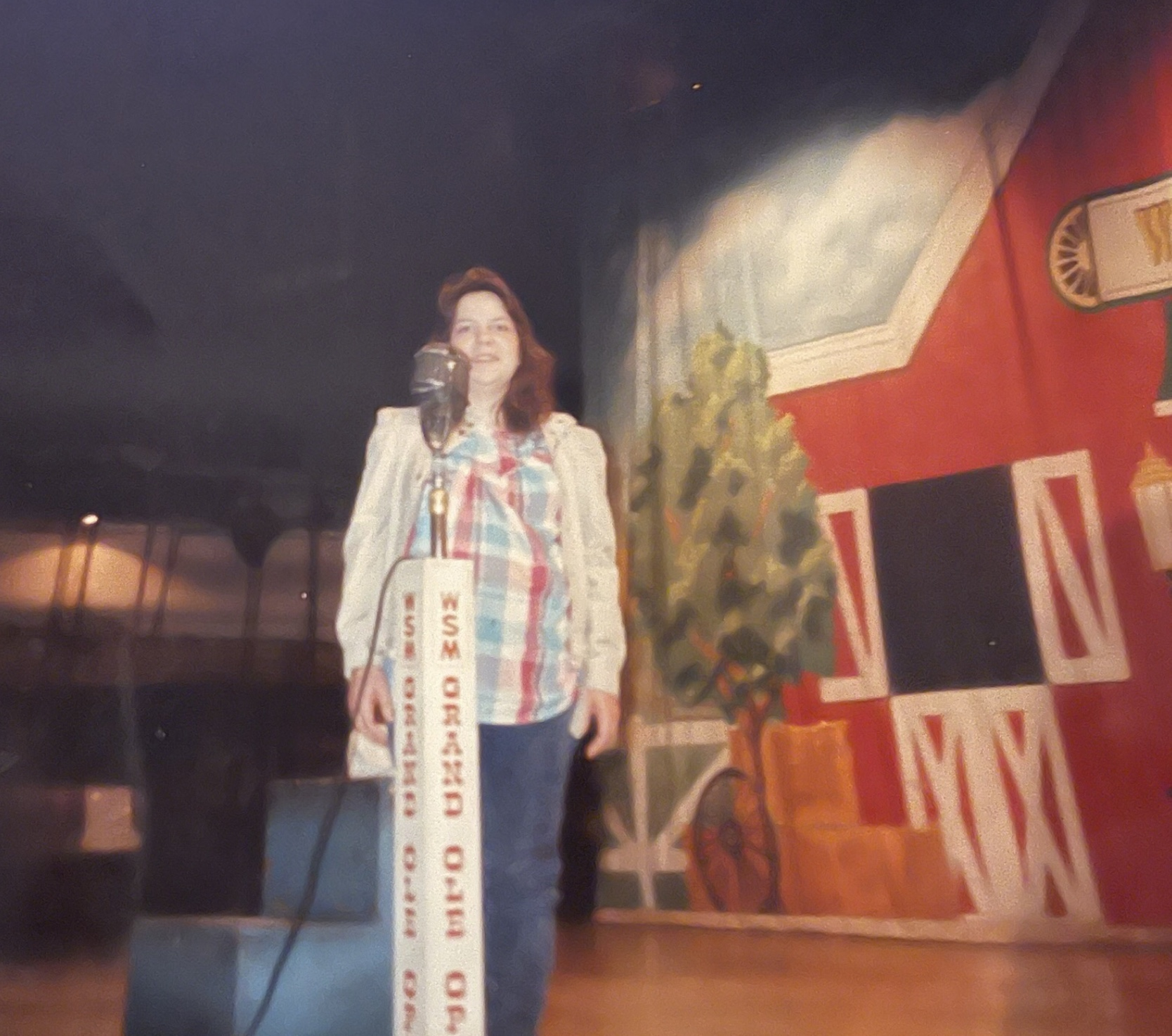
A country music fan on Ryman Auditorium stage in 1990

During its tenure at Ryman Auditorium, the Opry hosted the major country music stars of the day and became a show known around the world. In addition to its home on WSM, portions of the show (at various times throughout its history) were also broadcast on network radio and television to a wider audience. Melding its then-current usage with the building's origins as a house of worship, the Ryman got the nickname "The Mother Church of Country Music", which it holds to this day.

Because of the period during which it was constructed and because it was not designed to be a performance venue, the Ryman lacked a true backstage area. It had only one dressing room for the men, and women were relegated to an inadequate ladies' restroom. The shortage of space forced performers to wait in the wings, the narrow hallways, and the alley behind the building's south wall. Thus, many performers often ventured across the alley to Tootsie's Orchid Lounge and other bars, where they drank alongside patrons and sometimes performed. This practice enhanced the popularity and appeal of the honky-tonk bars along Nashville's Lower Broadway.

The Ryman through the mid-1960s hosted many musicians: Marian Anderson in 1932, Bill Monroe and the Bluegrass Boys in 1945, Little Jimmy Dickens in 1948, Hank Williams in 1949, The Carter Sisters with Mother Maybelle Carter in 1950, Elvis in 1954, Johnny Cash in 1956, trumpeter Louis Armstrong in 1957, Patsy Cline in 1960, Lester Flatt & Earl Scruggs (bluegrass) in 1964, and Minnie Pearl in 1964.

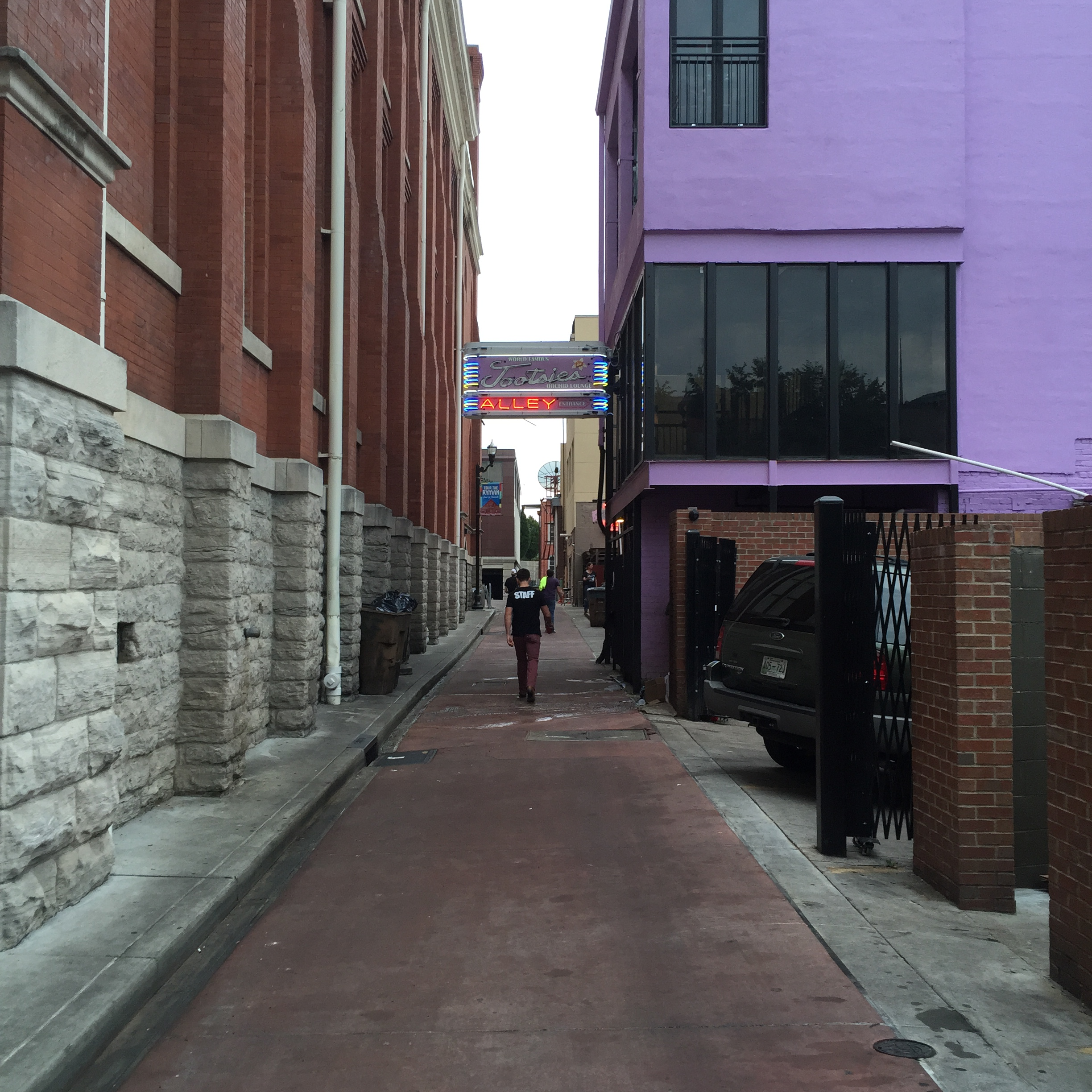
Alley between Ryman Auditorium and the rear of Broadway "Honky Tonks", including Tootsie's Orchid Lounge

Prior to September 27, 1963, Ryman Auditorium had no singular owner; it was an independent entity governed by a board of directors. That changed when WSM, Inc., purchased the building for US$207,500 (equivalent to $2,182,133 in 2025). When WSM assumed total control of the auditorium, it renamed the building as the Grand Ole Opry House. Many people continued to refer to it by the familiar Ryman name, well-known after 60 years in use.

WSM financed minor upgrades to the Opry House in 1966 to maintain its functionality, but soon began making plans to move the Opry to a new location altogether. Despite the building's deteriorating condition, the lack of air conditioning, and the abundance of unsavory surroundings in its urban neighborhood, the show's increasing popularity often attracted crowds too large to fit inside the venue. Plans announced in 1969 centered around a larger, custom-built auditorium that would provide a more controlled and comfortable atmosphere for audiences and performers alike, as well as better radio and television production facilities.

The company purchased a large tract of land in a then-rural area a few miles away. The new Opry theater served as the anchor of a grand entertainment complex. The development became known as Opryland USA. It eventually included the Opryland theme park and the Opryland Hotel.

The amusement park opened on May 27, 1972, and the new venue (also called the Grand Ole Opry House) debuted on Saturday, March 16, 1974. The last Opry show at the Ryman occurred the previous evening, on Friday, March 15. The final shows downtown were emotional. Sarah Cannon, performing as Minnie Pearl, broke character and cried on stage. In an effort to maintain continuity with the Opry's storied past, a large circle was cut from the floor of the Ryman stage and inlaid into the center of the new Opry stage. In another traditional holdover, the new Opry House was also designed to feature pew seating, although (unlike the Ryman) they are cushioned.

Eventually and without fanfare, the building downtown resumed using the Ryman Auditorium name to differentiate it from the new Grand Ole Opry House.

=== Facing demolition ===
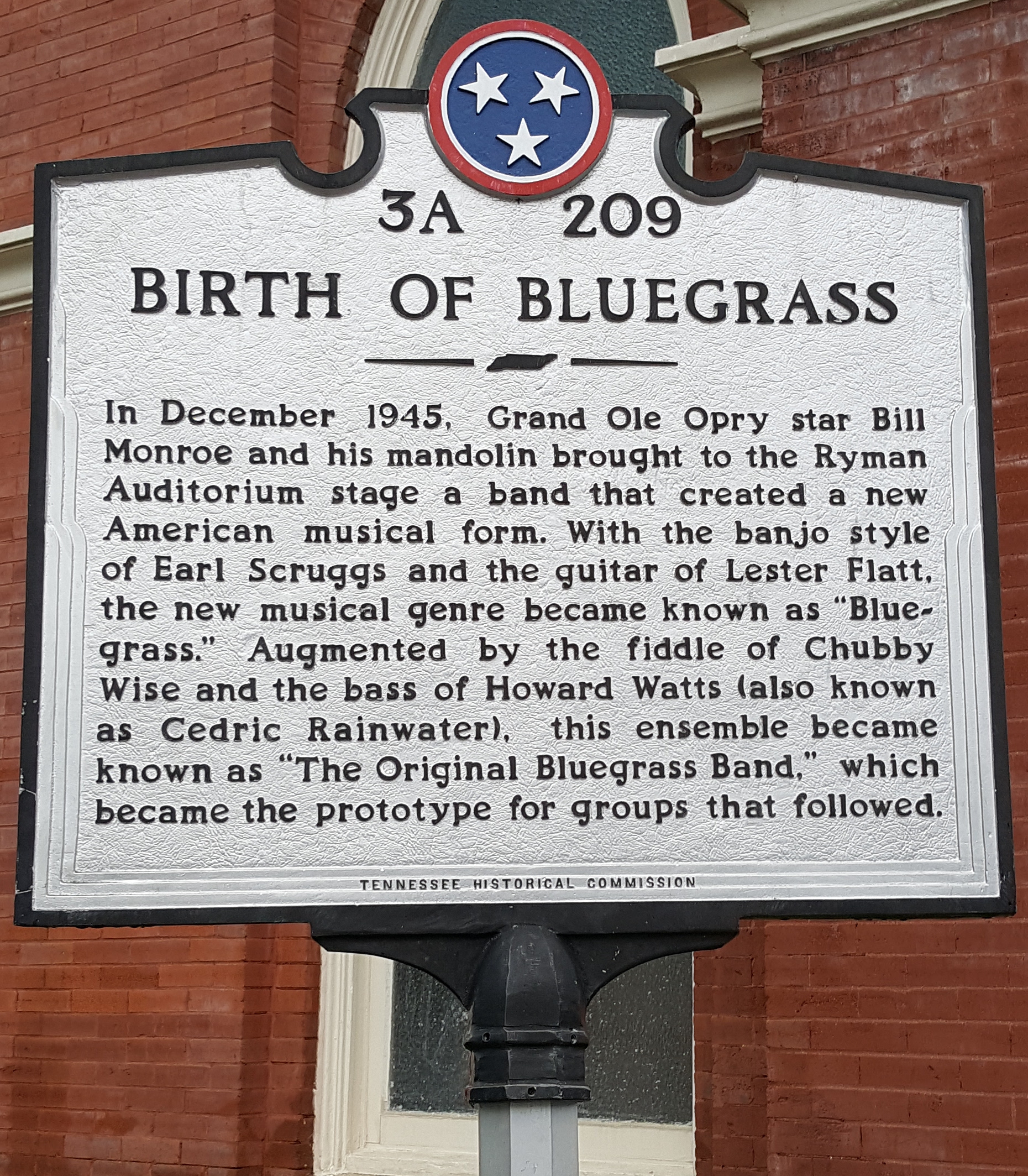
Tennessee Historical Commission marker outside Ryman Auditorium, signifying the site as the birthplace of Bluegrass music

When the plans for Opryland USA were announced, WSM president Irving Waugh also revealed the company's intent to demolish the Ryman and use its materials to construct a chapel called "The Little Church of Opryland" at the amusement park. Waugh brought in a consultant to evaluate the building, noted theatrical producer Jo Mielziner, who had staged a production at the Ryman in 1935. He concluded that the Ryman was "full of bad workmanship and contains nothing of value as a theater worth restoring." Mielziner suggested the auditorium be razed and replaced with a modern theater. But Waugh's plans were met with resounding resistance from the public, including many influential musicians of the time. Architectural critic Ada Louise Huxtable ridiculed the decision in The New York Times, writing: "First prize for the pious misuse of a landmark, and a total misunderstanding of the principles of preservation. Gentlemen, for shame." (She had won a Pulitzer Prize for her writing.)

However, Roy Acuff, an Opry stalwart and a major stakeholder of Opryland USA, reportedly said, "I never want another note of music played in that building." He led the unsuccessful charge to tear down the Ryman. Acuff, a staunch supporter of moving the Opry to a modern home, told The Washington Post in 1974, "Most of my memories of the Ryman Auditorium are of misery, sweating out here on this stage, the audience suffering too... We've been shackled all of my career." Acuff notably hated the dressing room situation at the Ryman so much that he bought a nearby building just to have a bigger one. A life-sized statue of Acuff (alongside one of Sarah Cannon as Minnie Pearl) has been installed in the lobby of the preserved Ryman Auditorium.

Members of historic preservation groups argued that WSM, Inc. (and Acuff, by proxy) exaggerated the Ryman's poor condition, saying the company was worried that attachment to the old building would hurt business at the new Opry House. Preservationists emphasized the building's importance to regional religious history and gained traction for their case as a result. The building was formally assessed and approved for the National Register of Historic Places in 1971. In 1974, United States Senators from Tennessee Howard Baker and Bill Brock, together with officials of the United States Department of the Interior, pleaded with WSM, Inc. (and its parent company, NLT Corporation) to preserve the building. The company tabled the decision on the Ryman's fate. The building was ultimately saved from demolition, although no active efforts were made to improve its condition.

- Ryman Auditorium
- U.S. National Register of Historic Places
- U.S. National Historic Landmark
- Location within Tennessee
- Location: 116 Fifth Ave. N Nashville, Tennessee
- Coordinates: 36°9′40.6″N 86°46′42.6″W
- Area: 1 acre (0.40 ha)
- Built: 1891
- Architect: Hugh Cathcart Thompson
- Restored: 1952, 1989, 1994
- NRHP reference No.: 71000819

Significant dates
- Added to NRHP: May 6, 1971
- Designated NHL: January 3, 2001

=== Dormancy ===
Following the departure of the Opry, the Ryman failed to attract new performers. It was mostly vacant and deteriorating for nearly 20 years. In that period, the surrounding neighborhood also declined. Despite its regressing condition and the absence of performances, Ryman Auditorium was never closed. It remained a destination for heritage tourism in the city.

On August 30, 1979, following a tip from a citizen, the Nashville bomb squad discovered and disarmed a massive car bomb that could have damaged or destroyed a three-block area of downtown Nashville that included the Ryman. A nearby strip club was found to be the bomber's target. The device was disarmed less than 20 minutes before it was timed to detonate.

In September 1983, soon after NLT Corporation was acquired in a hostile takeover bid by American General Insurance, the building was included in the sale of all the WSM and Opryland properties to Oklahoma-based Gaylord Broadcasting Company for US$250,000,000 (equivalent to $808,135,650 in 2025). (The WSM assets were organized into a subsidiary holding company called Opryland USA, Inc., which would change its name to Gaylord Entertainment Company following a 1991 corporate spin-off.) The company's chief executive, Ed Gaylord, had become acquainted with many of the Opry stars during his involvement with the long-running television series Hee Haw. His fondness for the Opry and friendships with its figures – particularly Sarah Cannon – are often cited as reasons for his interest in the acquisition. Ryman Auditorium was included in the sale almost as an afterthought, but Gaylord's appreciation of its history helped preserve it.

In 1986, as part of the Grand Ole Opry 60th-anniversary celebration, CBS aired a special program that featured some of the Opry's legendary stars performing at the Ryman. While the auditorium was dormant, major motion pictures continued to be filmed on location there, including John Carpenter's Elvis (1979), Coal Miner's Daughter (1980 – Loretta Lynn Oscar-winning biopic), Sweet Dreams (1985 – story of Patsy Cline), and Clint Eastwood's Honkytonk Man (1982). A 1979 television special, Dolly & Carol in Nashville, included a segment featuring Dolly Parton performing a gospel medley on the Ryman stage.

=== Revival and renovations ===
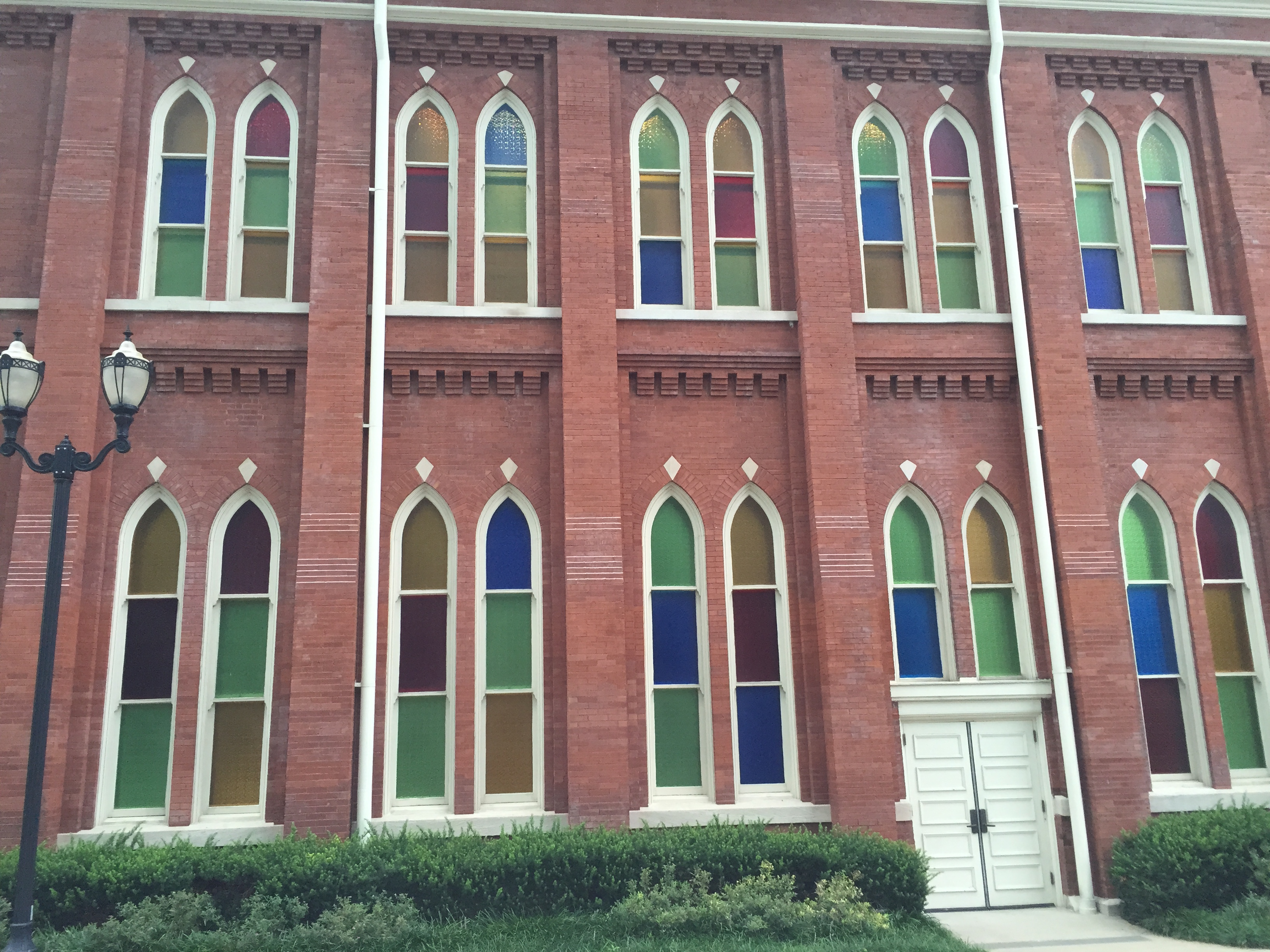
Stained glass windows on the north-facing exterior of Ryman Auditorium

In 1989, Opryland USA, Inc. began work to beautify the Ryman's exterior. The structure of the building was also improved, as the company installed a new roof, replaced broken windows, and repaired broken bricks and wood. The building's interior, however, was left mostly untouched.

From April 30 to May 2, 1991, Emmylou Harris and the Nash Ramblers performed three acoustic concerts at the dilapidated building, during which no one was allowed to sit on or beneath the balcony due to safety concerns. Capacity was limited to around 200. Some of the recordings were released as an album entitled At the Ryman, which won the Grammy Award for Best Country Performance by a Duo or Group at the 35th Annual Grammy Awards in 1993. The concerts and album's high acclaim are given near-universal credit for renewed interest in reviving Ryman Auditorium as an active venue.

The Ryman hosted a concert and one-act play entitled The Ryman: The Tabernacle Becomes A Shrine on May 18, 1992, to celebrate the building's centennial. In October 1992, executives of Gaylord Entertainment announced plans to renovate the entire building and expand it to create modern amenities for performers and audiences alike. This was part of their larger initiative to invest in the city's revitalization of the downtown area.

In September 1993, renovations were begun to develop it as a world-class concert hall. Building systems were upgraded, such as air conditioning for the first time. The auditorium's original wooden pews were removed, refurbished, and returned to the building to serve as the auditorium's seating. Both far-reaching ends of the U-shaped balcony (which had previously extended all the way to the building's south wall) were removed. New backstage facilities were built inside the original building. An addition containing a lobby, restrooms, concessions, offices, and a grand staircase leading to the balcony was constructed and attached to the east side of the auditorium. With this change, the Ryman's main entrance was moved from the west side of the building (Fifth Avenue North) to the east side (Fourth Avenue North). An outdoor entry plaza was also added here, and a large statue of Thomas Ryman was installed.

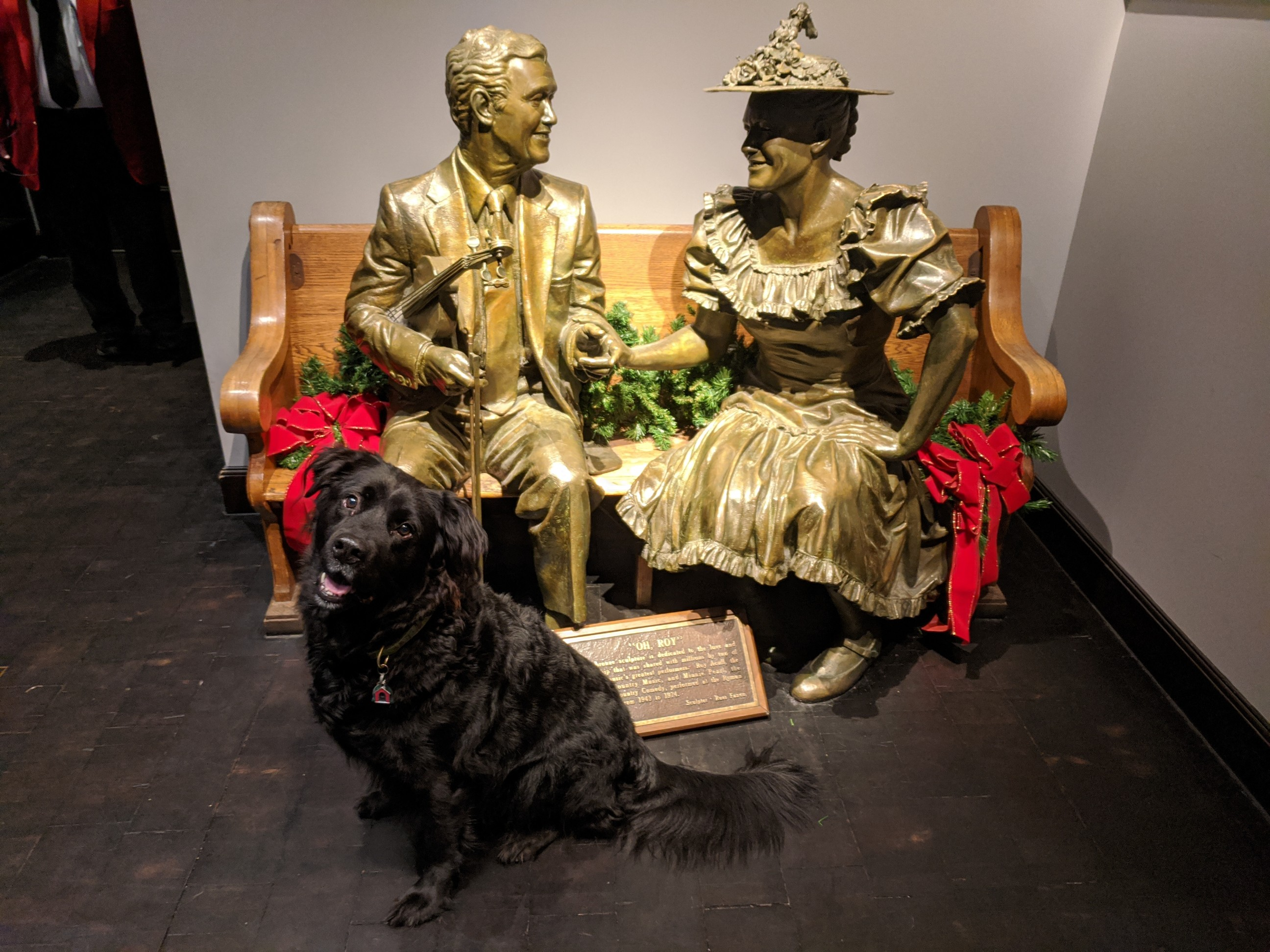
Statues of Roy Acuff and Minnie Pearl seated on a pew in the lobby of Ryman Auditorium

The first performance at the newly renovated Ryman was a broadcast of Garrison Keillor's A Prairie Home Companion on June 4, 1994. Keillor said he was inspired to create A Prairie Home Companion while reporting on the final Opry show at the Ryman in 1974 for The New Yorker. Following that, the Ryman hosted an extended residency of the original musical Always... Patsy Cline, which starred Mandy Barnett in the titular role about the life of the legendary singer.

=== Return of the Opry ===
On Sunday, October 18, 1998, the Opry held a benefit show at Ryman Auditorium, marking its return to the venue for the first time since its final show on March 15, 1974. The show was well received by fans, performers, and management alike, so the decision was made to host the Opry's regular shows there on January 15 and 16, 1999, as part of the celebration to commemorate 25 years at the new venue.

Given the success of the January shows that year, beginning in November 1999, the Opry was produced at Ryman Auditorium for three months. In addition, this enabled them to avoid performance conflicts from construction of the Opry Mills shopping mall (which replaced the Opryland USA theme park in 2000) next door to the Grand Ole Opry House. The Opry returned to the Ryman annually for all of its November, December, and January shows until 2019–20. This enabled the production to acknowledge its roots while taking advantage of a smaller venue during the off-peak season for tourism. It also freed the Grand Ole Opry House for special holiday presentations. The Ryman also served as the primary venue for the Opry in the summer of 2010, while the Grand Ole Opry House was undergoing repairs after damage from a devastating flood.

The annual winter season at the Ryman was suspended in 2020 due to the COVID-19 pandemic, during which the Opry performed abbreviated shows for broadcast in front of an empty Grand Ole Opry House. The Winter Ryman residency was not revived in 2021 although pandemic-related attendance restrictions were lifted. Opry shows returned to Ryman for a one-month run in January 2023, and a three-night run in January 2024. While still officially the Grand Ole Opry, the shows there have been billed as Opry at the Ryman.

=== The Ryman today ===
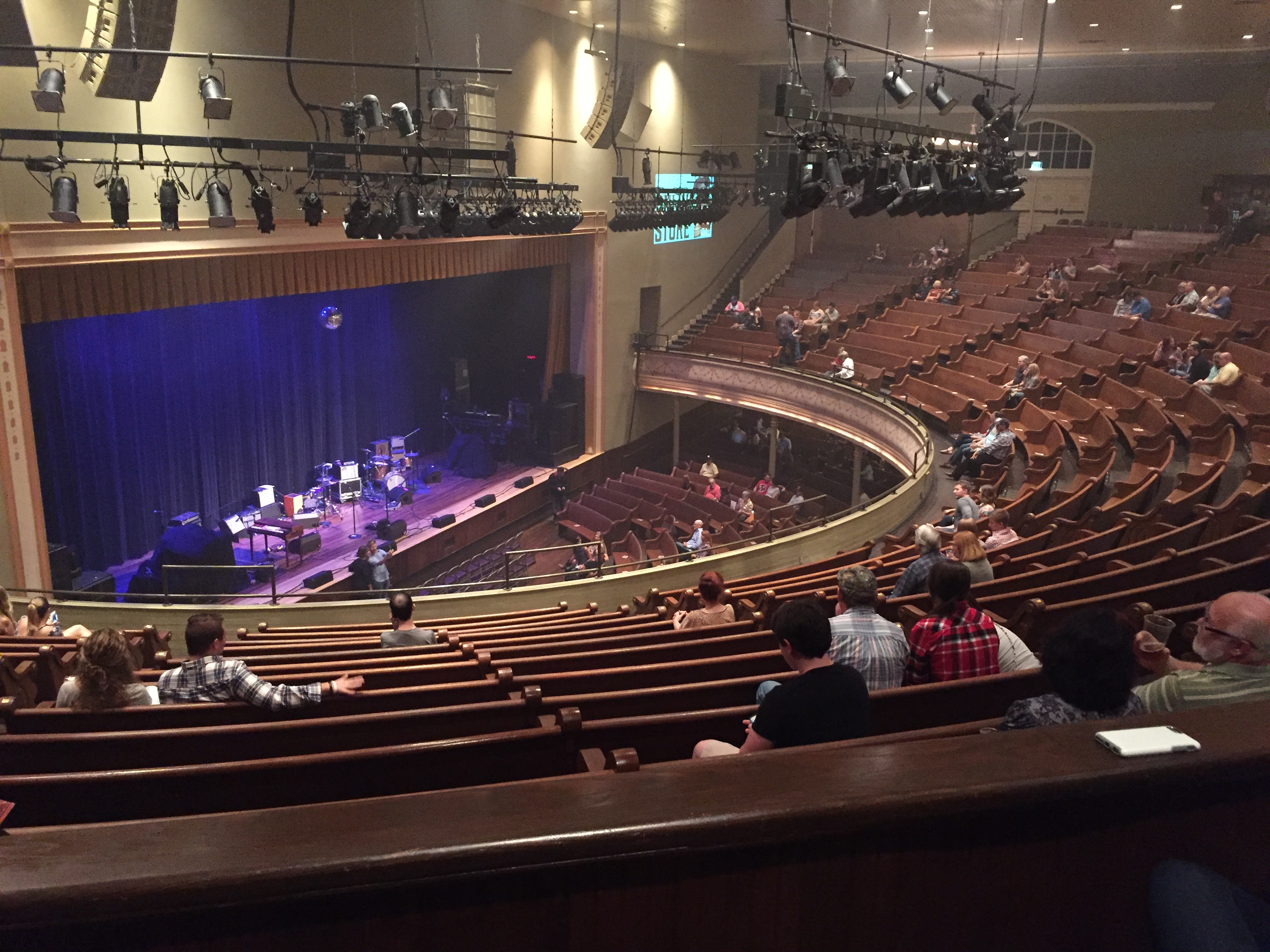
The interior of Ryman Auditorium before a show, as seen from the balcony behind section 15

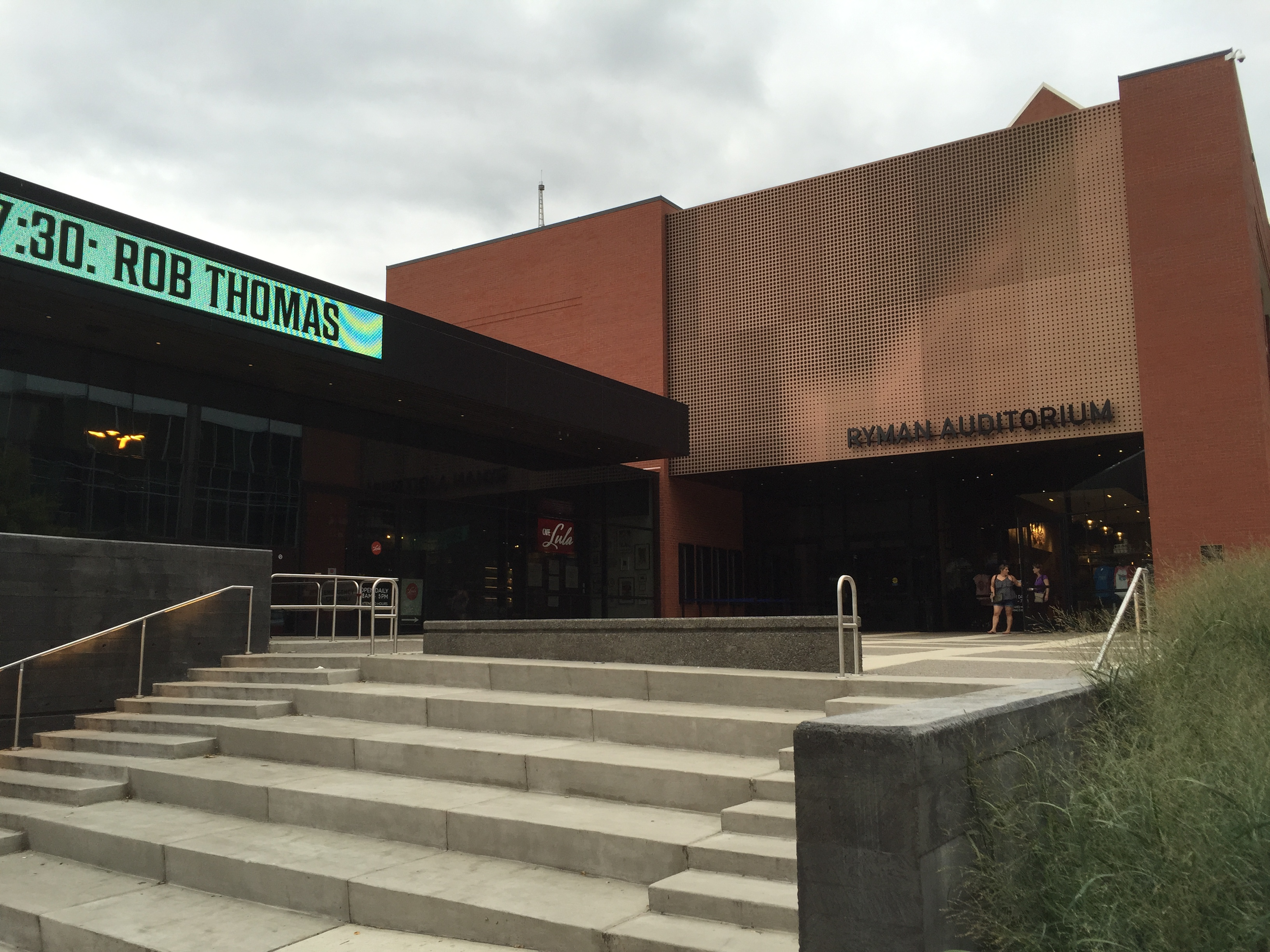
At the rear of the building, adjacent to 4th Avenue North, is an outdoor entry plaza leading to the building's main entrance and Cafe Lula. Constructed in 1994, this part of the property was renovated and expanded in 2015.

Gaylord Entertainment Company, the venue's owner since 1983, adopted the Ryman's name as its own when it transitioned into a real estate investment trust in 2012. The company is now known as Ryman Hospitality Properties, Inc. Ryman Auditorium is managed within the company's majority-owned subsidiary, Opry Entertainment Group. The renovation of the Ryman, combined with the construction of other attractions such as Bridgestone Arena and Wildhorse Saloon, helped revitalize Nashville's downtown district into a destination for tourists and locals alike in the mid-1990s.

The Ryman was unharmed in the 2010 Tennessee floods and the 2020 Nashville bombing, both of which resulted in major damage to parts of the downtown neighborhood.

In January 2012 plans were announced to replace the Ryman's 61-year-old stage with one of medium-brown Brazilian teak. The new stage floor, the facility's third, retained an 18-inch lip of its predecessor's blonde oak at its front edge, similar to the way the Ryman stage had been commemorated with an inlaid circle of wood at the new Opry House. The stage's original hickory support beams were reinforced with concrete foundations, crossbeams, and joist work that helped triple the stage's load capacity, ensuring it would remain viable for performances in the decades to come.

In 2015, the Ryman underwent another US$14,000,000 (equivalent to $19,015,864 in 2025) renovation and expansion. Much of the 1994 expansion was gutted and remodeled. The original building received only minor touch-ups and remained in use throughout the construction. The renovation and expansion includes more lobby space, plus expanded restrooms, concessions, and a retail shop. A new quick-service restaurant was added, called "Cafe Lula" and named in memory of Lula C. Naff. The cafe closed in 2020 due to the COVID-19 pandemic, and was not reopened. An expanded retail shop selling Ryman memorabilia opened in its place in 2023. The previous retail shop was then converted to a VIP lounge.

Prior to the pandemic, Opry Entertainment Group held regular shows at the Ryman year-round. In addition to the Opry at the Ryman shows in the winter, the auditorium hosted Opry Country Classics each spring and autumn, and Bluegrass Nights at the Ryman each summer. Due to the scheduling of concerts postponed during the pandemic, those Opry spin-off shows were canceled or moved to the Grand Ole Opry House in 2021. As COVID-19 hit Nashville, live music at the Ryman briefly came to a halt, until the venue launched the Livestream concert series, "Live at the Ryman" in August 2020. For King & Country, Cam, Chris Janson, Scotty McCreery, Brett Young, and Old Crow Medicine Show put on Friday night shows from the Ryman stage for a completely digital audience. Ultimately, Bluegrass Nights returned to the Ryman in 2021 and Opry at the Ryman returned in January 2023. Opry Country Classics has remained at the Grand Ole Opry House, except for a yearly matinee during CMA Fest in June.

The Ryman has welcomed a wide variety of talent since its inception. In recent years, Wu-Tang Clan made history as the Ryman's first hip-hop headliner; the Ryman welcomed its first headlining drag queens, Trixie and Katya; and the venue hosted its first comedy residency in August 2022, with comedian John Mulaney doing four stand-up shows in three nights.

Ryman Auditorium has hosted several notable residencies including a string of 10 shows from Little Big Town in 2017 that took place as part of the Ryman's 125th anniversary celebration. In 2022 alone, Vince Gill and Amy Grant, Vince Gill (solo), Jason Isbell, and Brett Eldredge all held residencies at the Ryman.

In 2018, the Ryman was named the most iconic structure in Tennessee by Architectural Digest. The Ryman has been named Pollstar's Theater of the Year 13 times and was named the Academy of Country Music's Theater of the Year in 2022. The Academy of Country Music Awards, Americana Music Association Awards, Nashville Songwriter Awards, and several other industry award ceremonies have taken place on the Ryman stage.

The Ryman features prominently in the music video of the 2021 song "Where Have You Gone" by Alan Jackson.

On May 26, 2022, the Ryman officially became a Rock & Roll Hall of Fame Landmark. Later that year, Rock & Roll Hall of Fame partnered with the Ryman to transform a wing of the building into a tour feature dedicated to rock history in Nashville. "Rock Hall at the Ryman" opened to the public on November 2, 2022, and includes artifacts from artists including Elvis Presley, James Brown, Joan Jett, Foo Fighters and Dolly Parton.

The Ryman has also served as a gathering place for the memorial services of many prominent country music figures. Tammy Wynette, Chet Atkins, Skeeter Davis, Harlan Howard, Bill Monroe, Waylon Jennings, Johnny Cash, Billy Block, George Hamilton IV, Earl Scruggs, Jim Ed Brown, and Naomi Judd have all been memorialized from the Ryman stage.

== Museum and tours ==
The Ryman is open for tours during daytime hours when the performance venue is not in active use. Guided tours include access to backstage facilities, while self-guided tours feature exhibits displayed in cases throughout the auditorium, which are shielded from view when the building is being used for a show. Permanent exhibits include the Rock Hall At The Ryman, a collaboration with the Rock & Roll Hall of Fame showcasing the venue's influence in the rock genre, as well as the Soul of Nashville, a short holographic film that serves as the first stop on the tour. Situated in an immersive 100-seat theatre, the film features an actress portraying Lula C. Naff in presenting the history of the Ryman. It also features an original song performed by Darius Rucker, Sheryl Crow, Vince Gill, and the Fisk Jubilee Singers.

== Notable events ==
The venue hosts alternative rock, bluegrass, blues, country, classical, folk, gospel, jazz, pop, hip hop, and rock concerts, as well as musical theater and stand-up comedy.

- The Hardeman Tabernacle Sermons were held at the Ryman beginning in 1922 through 1942. A series of New Testament gospel sermons by N.B. Hardeman, minister of the gospel with the churches of Christ. They were sold-out events turning away up to 3,000 people. Lessons were published in the then Nashville Banner and Tennessean. Freed-Hardeman University in Henderson, TN bears his name as one of its founders.
- The Ryman was home to the Grand Ole Opry from 1943 to 1974, a period when many traditional country music artists, including Dolly Parton, Tammy Wynette, Loretta Lynn, Hank Williams (who received six encores), Bill Monroe, and Patsy Cline made their Opry debuts.
- Country Music Association Awards shows were performed and broadcast live from the Ryman from 1968 through 1973.
- Most episodes of the ABC variety series The Johnny Cash Show were recorded at the auditorium and broadcast between June 7, 1969, and March 31, 1971. Besides its host, the series also featured Carl Perkins, Derek and the Dominos (their only televised performance), Tennessee Three, Statler Brothers, and the Carter Family. One episode featured one of the final public appearances of jazz icon Louis Armstrong.
- In 1999, Bill Gaither recorded The Cathedrals' Farewell Celebration video and album there with various other artists, such as The Statler Brothers, The Oak Ridge Boys, Guy Penrod, and Sandi Patti.
- On January 30, 2003, Patty Griffin recorded her live album, A Kiss in Time, at the Ryman.
- In 2005 Neil Young recorded the Jonathan Demme-directed concert film Neil Young: Heart of Gold at the Ryman.
- In April 2006 Josh Turner recorded a live album at the Ryman.
- In May 2006 English band Erasure recorded their live album (on both CD and DVD), titled On The Road To Nashville.
- In 2009 Jonny Lang recorded Live at the Ryman. It debuted at number 2 on the Billboard Blues chart.
- On July 7, 2012, Ringo Starr recorded his 72nd birthday concert, called "Ringo at the Ryman", with his All-Starr Band.
- In 2014, Foo Fighters performed at the Ryman as part of the Foo Fighters: Sonic Highways television series.
- On September 8, 2016, Garth Brooks performed at the Ryman for the first time ever in his professional career (30-plus years) while promoting a live concert recording to debut his new channel on SiriusXM radio, The Garth Channel.
- On July 27–28, 2018, Grammy Award winner Anita Baker performed at the Ryman as part of her Farewell Tour. She sold out both show dates.
- On June 9, 2019, Wu-Tang Clan performed the first concert consisting solely of hip hop music at the Ryman.
- On April 4, 2021, during the COVID-19 pandemic, Carrie Underwood performed her album My Savior in a live, virtual concert from the Ryman stage.
- On June 8, 2021, following the lifting of restrictions from the COVID-19 pandemic, Miley Cyrus headlined Peacock's special Miley Cyrus Presents Stand by You, celebrating Pride Month, featuring Little Big Town, Maren Morris, Brothers Osborne, and more in a live, virtual concert from the Ryman stage.
- On April 14, 2022, Wheeler Walker, Jr. commenced his 2022 Comeback Tour by performing at the sold out venue. He broke alcohol and merchandise sales records.
- In August 2022, the Ryman hosted its first comedy residency with comedian John Mulaney doing four stand-up shows in three nights.
- On November 13, 2022, Lynyrd Skynyrd performed at the Ryman Auditorium, as part of their Big Wheels Keep On Turnin' Tour. The concert was the final performance for founding guitarist Gary Rossington, before his death on March 20, 2023.
- On May 14, 2024, Sum 41 performed as part of their Tour of the Setting Sum at Ryman, The Interrupters and Joey Valence & Brae opened.

== See also ==
- Academy of Country Music
- Country Music Hall of Fame
- List of country music performers
