= Bud Wendell =

American country music executive (born 1927)

Earl Wade "Bud" Wendell (born 17 August 1927) is an American country music executive. Wendell was the chief executive officer and president of Gaylord Entertainment from 1991 until his retirement in 1997. He was awarded the Silver Buffalo Award from the Boy Scouts of America in 1996 and inducted into the Country Music Hall of Fame in 1998.

== Early life and education ==
Wendell was born on 17 August 1927 in Akron, Ohio. During his childhood, he was a member of the Boy Scouts of America and became an assistant scout leader. As an adult, Wendell served in the United States Navy during World War II. For his post-secondary education, he completed a Bachelor of Arts at the College of Wooster in 1950 specializing in economics.

== Career ==
Wendell started working with the National Life and Accident Insurance Company in 1950 selling insurance. In 1962, he moved to work at the insurance company's main location in Nashville, Tennessee. Wendell changed his career in 1965 when he became an executive assistant at WSM. Years later, he was named manager of the Grand Ole Opry in 1968. His positions at the Opry and WSM changed in 1974 when he was named general manager of the Grand Ole Opry and WSM's vice president in the same year.

In 1978, Wendell held his first leadership positions as chief executive officer and president of WSM. He was appointed these same positions when he started working for Gaylord Entertainment in 1991. As Gaylord's president, Wendell expanded the Country Music Television channel's broadcast globally into parts of Latin America and Asia in the early 1990s. He also launched the Wildhorse Saloon in Nashville and Opryland Music Group before retiring in 1997.

== Awards and honors ==
Wendell was inducted into the Country Music Hall of Fame in 1998 and the Music City Walk of Fame in 2015. Apart from his inductions, Wendell received the Silver Buffalo Award in 1996 from the Boy Scouts of America.

== Personal life ==
Wendell is married with four children.
