= Frances W. Preston =

American music executive (1928–2012)

- Born: Frances Loree Williams; August 27, 1928; Nashville, Tennessee
- Died: June 13, 2012 (aged 83); Nashville, Tennessee
- Occupation: Music executive
- Known for: Chief executive officer and president of Broadcast Music, Inc. (1986—2004)

Frances W. Preston (27 August 1928 – 13 June 2012) was an American music executive. She was the Chief executive officer of Broadcast Music, Inc. from 1986 to 2004. Preston was inducted into the Country Music Hall of Fame in 1992, Gospel Music Hall of Fame in 2004 and Music City Walk of Fame in 2007. Apart from her inductions, Preston received the Grammy Trustees Award in 1998.

== Early life and education ==
On 27 August 1928, Preston was born as Frances Loree Williams in Nashville, Tennessee. She completed a teacher's program at Peabody College.

== Career ==
Preston started her career with WSM (AM) as a mail clerk and became a television host for WSM-TV. She then worked in event promotions for a precursor of the CMA Music Festival. Preston moved to Broadcast Music, Inc. in 1958 and launched a Nashville branch for the organization. She planned the creation of the BMI Country Awards and was promoted to vice president in 1964. She remained as vice president until she was named senior vice president of performing rights in 1985.

From 1986 to 2004, Preston was the chief executive officer and president of BMI. During her time as president, Preston was a part of the Copyright Renewal Act of 1992 and Copyright Term Extension Act in 1998. She remained as CEO until August 2004 and was named emeritus for the rest of 2004. Outside of music, Preston served on committees for Jimmy Carter and Al Gore.

== Awards and honors ==
In 1992, Preston was inducted into the Country Music Hall of Fame. Also that year, Preston received an honorary doctorate of music from Berklee College of Music. Additional inductions include the Gospel Music Hall of Fame in 2004 and the Music City Walk of Fame in 2007. Outside of music halls, Preston was awarded the Grammy Trustees Award at the 40th Annual Grammy Awards and named to the Broadcasting and Cable Hall of Fame in 1999.

== Personal life ==
Preston was divorced and had three children.

=== Death ===
Preston died from heart failure on 13 June 2012 in Nashville.
