= List of songs recorded by Connie Smith =

American country signer Connie Smith has released 39 studio albums, one live album, 15 compilation albums, three box sets, and has made numerous appearances on various other albums. This page lists every song recorded by Smith that has been commercially released.

== Released songs ==
Title	Artist(s)	Writer(s)	Album	Year	Ref
"A Far Cry from You"	Connie Smith	Steve Earle; Jimbeau Hinson	Single A-side	1985	
"A Good Place to Turn Around"	Gene Watson with Connie Smith	Rebecca Lynn Howard; Jon Mabe; Jason Matthews	In a Perfect World	2007	
"A Heart Like You"	Connie Smith	Dallas Frazier; Glenn Ashworth	Long Line of Heartaches	2011	
"A House of Gold"	Connie Smith	Hank Williams	Connie Smith Sings Hank Williams Gospel	1975	
"A Lonely Woman"	Connie Smith	Jean Chapel; Alda Calogne	Connie's Country	1969	
"A Million and One"	Connie Smith	Yvonne DeVaney	The Cry of the Heart	2021	
"A Picture of Me (Without You)"	Connie Smith	George Richey; Norro Wilson	A Lady Named Smith	1973	
"A Tale from Tahrarrie"	Connie Smith	Connie Smith; Marty Stuart	Connie Smith	1998	
"A Touch of Yesterday"	Connie Smith	Dallas Frazier; A.L. Owens	Born to Sing	1966	
"A' Sleeping at the Foot of the Bed"	Connie Smith	Happy Wilson; Luther Patrick	Connie in the Country	1967	
"Ain't Had No Lovin'"	Connie Smith	Dallas Frazier	Born to Sing	1966	
"Ain't Had No Lovin'"	Connie Smith	Dallas Frazier	The Best of Connie Smith	1989	
"Ain't Had No Lovin'"	Connie Smith	Dallas Frazier	Live in Branson, MO, USA (Note: Recorded as part of a medley.)	1993	
"Ain't It Good to Be in Love Again"	Connie Smith	Dewayne Orender	I Got a Lot of Hurtin' Done Today / I've Got My Baby on My Mind	1975	
"Ain't Love a Good Thing"	Connie Smith	Dallas Frazier	That's the Way Love Goes	1974	
"Ain't Nothin' Shakin' (But the Leaves)"	Connie Smith	Dallas Frazier; A.L. Owens	Miss Smith Goes to Nashville	1966	
"Ain't We Havin' Us a Good Time"	Connie Smith	Dallas Frazier; A.L. Owens	Ain't We Havin' Us a Good Time	1972	
"Ain't You Even Gonna Cry"	Connie Smith	Johnny Russell	Long Line of Heartaches	2011	
"All of a Sudden"	Connie Smith	Steve Collum	New Horizons	1978	
"All the Praises"	Connie Smith	Carmol Taylor; Jerry Strickland	Dream Painter	1973	
"All the Time"	Connie Smith	Mel Tillis; Wayne P. Walker	The Cry of the Heart	2021	
"Alone with You"	Connie Smith	Faron Young; Lester Vanadore; Roy Drusky	I Never Once Stopped Loving You	1970	
"Amazing Grace"	Connie Smith	John Newton	Just One Time	1971	
"Amazing Grace"	Connie Smith	John Newton	Once a Day (Note: Although it is not mentioned in the liner notes, the ten recordings released on the 1991 compilation Once a Day are the original undubbed masters of songs Smith recorded on December 8, 1972, for the US Armed Forces Navy Hoedown radio series. In total, Smith recorded sixteen songs during this session, thirteen of which would be overdubbed in 2014 for release on the 2015 compilation The Lost Tapes.)	1991	
"Amazing Grace"	Connie Smith	John Newton	The Lost Tapes	2015	
"Anymore"	Connie Smith	Roy Drusky; Vic McAlpin; Marie Wilson	Long Line of Heartaches	2011	
"Are You Walking and A-Talking for the Lord"	Connie Smith	Hank Williams	Connie Smith Sings Hank Williams Gospel	1975	
"As Long as We've Got Each Other"	Connie Smith	Dallas Frazier; A.L. Owens	Ain't We Havin' Us a Good Time	1972	
"At the Foot of the Cross"	Connie Smith	Larry Lee	God Is Abundant	1973	
"Away in a Manger"	Connie Smith	Traditional	Joy to the World	1975	
"Baby's Back Again"	Connie Smith	Betty Jean Robinson	I Love Charley Brown	1968	
"Back in Baby's Arms"	Connie Smith	Bob Montgomery	Back in Baby's Arms	1969	
"Back in the Country"	Connie Smith	Eddy Raven	I Got a Lot of Hurtin' Done Today / I've Got My Baby on My Mind	1975	
"Be All Right in Arkansas"	Connie Smith	Billy D. Burns; Jerry House	That's the Way Love Goes	1974	
"Beautiful Star of Bethlehem"	Ralph Stanley with Connie Smith	R. Fisher Boyce	Clinch Mountain Country	1998	
"Because I Love You That's Why"	Connie Smith	Dallas Frazier	The Song We Fell in Love To	1976	
"Because of Yesterday"	Connie Smith	Levon Dewey; Cleon Dewey	I Never Knew (What That Song Meant Before)	1974	
"Before I'm Over You"	Connie Smith	Betty Sue Perry	Where Is My Castle	1971	
"Between Each Tear"	Connie Smith	Dallas Frazier	I Love Charley Brown	1968	
"Big Foot"	Marty Stuart with Connie Smith	Johnny Cash	Badlands: Ballads of the Lakota	2005	
"Blue, Blue Day"	Connie Smith	Don Gibson	Just for What I Am	2012	
"Blue Heartaches"	Connie Smith	Connie Smith; Marty Stuart	Long Line of Heartaches	2011	
"Blue Little Girl"	Connie Smith	Betty Jean Robinson	Connie's Country	1969	
"Born a Woman"	Connie Smith	Martha Sharp	Downtown Country	1967	
"Born to Sing"	Connie Smith	Cy Coben	Born to Sing	1966	
"Bringin' It Home"	Connie Smith and Dallas Frazier	Dallas Frazier	If It Ain't Love and Other Great Dallas Frazier Songs	1972	
"Burning a Hole in My Mind"	Connie Smith	Cy Coben	I Love Charley Brown	1968	
"Burning a Hole in My Mind"	Connie Smith	Cy Coben	Born to Sing (Note: The 2001 Bear Family box set Born to Sing features an alternate take of "Burning a Hold in My Mind" in addition to the original album version.)	2001	
"Burning Bridges"	Connie Smith	Walter Scott	Soul of Country Music	1967	
"Calling You"	Connie Smith	Hank Williams	Connie Smith Sings Hank Williams Gospel	1975	
"Cincinnati, Ohio	Connie Smith	Bill Anderson	Connie Smith Sings Bill Anderson	1967	
"Cincinnati, Ohio	Connie Smith	Bill Anderson	The Best of Connie Smith	1989	
"Cincinnati, Ohio	Connie Smith	Bill Anderson	Once a Day	1991	
"Cincinnati, Ohio	Connie Smith	Bill Anderson	Live in Branson, MO, USA	1993	
"Cincinnati, Ohio	Connie Smith	Bill Anderson	Rare Country Legends Live	2006	
"Cincinnati, Ohio	Connie Smith	Bill Anderson	The Lost Tapes	2015	
"City Lights"	Connie Smith	Bill Anderson	Connie Smith Sings Bill Anderson	1967	
"Clinging to a Saving Hand"	Connie Smith	Bill Mack	Where Is My Castle	1971	
"Clinging to a Saving Hand"	Connie Smith	Bill Mack	Clinging to a Saving Hand	1995	
"Closer to Home"	Connie Smith, Sharon White, and Barbara Fairchild	Dave Clark; Wayne Haun; Tony Wood	Love Never Fails	2003	
"Come Along and Walk with Me"	Connie Smith	Dallas Frazier; A.L. Owens	Come Along and Walk with Me	1971	
"Come on Down"	Connie Smith	Jack Hayford; Steve Stone	I Don't Wanna Talk It Over Anymore	1976	
"Coming Around"	Connie Smith	Red Lane	Pure Connie Smith	1977	
"Constantly"	Connie Smith	Connie Smith	I Don't Wanna Talk It Over Anymore	1976	
"Country Girl"	Connie Smith	Dottie West; Red Lane	Just for What I Am	2012	
"Crumbs from the Table"	Connie Smith and Nat Stuckey	Barbara Miller	Sunday Morning with Nat Stuckey and Connie Smith	1970	
"Crumbs from the Table"	Connie Smith	Barbara Miller	Come Along and Walk with Me	1971	
"Crumbs from the Table"	Connie Smith	Barbara Miller	Clinging to a Saving Hand	1995	
"Cry, Cry Cry"	Connie Smith	Shirley Wood	Connie in the Country	1967	
"Daddy Sang Bass"	Connie Smith and Nat Stuckey	Carl Perkins	Sunday Morning with Nat Stuckey and Connie Smith	1970	
"Dallas"	Connie Smith	Leona Williams	That's the Way Love Goes	1974	
"Darling, Are You Ever Coming Home"	Connie Smith	Hank Cochran; Willie Nelson	Connie Smith	1965	
"Darling Days"	Connie Smith	Dallas Frazier; Sanger D. Shafer	Where Is My Castle	1971	
"Did We Have to Come This Far (To Say Goodbye)"	Connie Smith	Dallas Frazier; A.L. Owens	I Never Knew (What That Song Meant Before)	1974	
"Did We Have to Come This Far (To Say Goodbye)"	Connie Smith	Dallas Frazier; A.L. Owens	By Request	1995	
"Did You Let Your Light Shine"	Connie Smith and Nat Stuckey	Barbara Miller	Sunday Morning with Nat Stuckey and Connie Smith	1970	
"Didn't We Shine"	Randy Travis with George Jones, Lorrie Morgan, Ray Price, Connie Smith, Joe Stampley, and Gene Watson	Don Schlitz; Jesse Winchester	Anniversary Celebration	2011	
"Don't Feel Sorry for Me"	Connie Smith	Ted Harris	I Love Charley Brown	1968	
"Don't Forget (I Still Love You)"	Connie Smith	Guy Louis	Connie Smith	1965	
"Don't Keep Me Waiting Too Long"	Connie Smith	Melba Montgomery	Soul of Country Music	1967	
"Don't Let Me Walk Too Far from Calvary"	Connie Smith	Dottie Rambo	Come Along and Walk with Me	1971	
"Don't Make Me Dream (If Dreamin' Can't Come True)"	Connie Smith	Wanda Mallette; Bob Morrison	Single A-side	1983	
"Don't Say Love"	Connie Smith	Jimmy Payne; Jim Glaser	Single A-side	1979	
"Don't Tell Him That I'm Still Crying"	Connie Smith	Dallas Frazier	If It Ain't Love and Other Great Dallas Frazier Songs	1972	
"Don't Touch (The Pain's Not Dry)"	Connie Smith	David Chamberlain; Bucky Jones	"A Far Cry from You" B-side	1985	
"Don't Treat Me Like a Stranger"	Connie Smith	Dave Loggins	Pure Connie Smith	1977	
"Don't Walk Away"	Connie Smith	Connie Smith	Just One Time	1971	
"Downtown"	Connie Smith	Tony Hatch	Downtown Country	1967	
"Dream Painter"	Connie Smith	Dallas Frazier; Sanger D. Shafer	Dream Painter	1973	
"Easy Come – Easy Go"	Connie Smith	Bill Anderson	Connie Smith Sings Bill Anderson	1967	
"Even the Bad Times Are Good"	Connie Smith and Nat Stuckey	Clyde Pitts; Carl Belew	Young Love	1969	
"Even Tho"	Connie Smith	Willie Jones; Curt Peeples; Webb Pierce	Cute 'n' Country	1965	
"Ever Near"	Connie Smith, Sharon White, and Barbara Fairchild	Mary Funderburk; Dee Gaskin	Love Never Fails	2003	
"Every Move You Make (Is Saying Goodbye)"	Connie Smith	Steve Collum	Pure Connie Smith	1977	
"Everybody Loves Somebody"	Connie Smith	Ken Lane; Irving Taylor	Downtown Country	1967	
"Everybody's Gotta Be Somewhere"	Connie Smith	Johnny Russell	Born to Sing	2001	
"Everything's Found a Home with Me (But You)"	Connie Smith	Dallas Frazier	If It Ain't Love and Other Great Dallas Frazier Songs	1972	
"Family Bible"	Connie Smith	Walt Breeland; Claude Gray; Paul Buskirk	Soul of Country Music	1967	
"Farther Along"	Connie Smith	Traditional	Connie Smith Sings Great Sacred Songs	1966	
"Fight On"	Connie Smith, Sharon White, and Barbara Fairchild	Cindi Ballard; Gina Vera	Love Never Fails	2003	
"Five Fingers to Spare"	Connie Smith	Liz Anderson	Born to Sing	1966	
"Fool #1"	Connie Smith	Kathryn R. Fulton	Back in Baby's Arms	1969	
"Foolin' Around"	Connie Smith	Harlan Howard; Buck Owens	Connie in the Country	1967	
"For Better or for Worse"	Connie Smith	Bill Anderson; Moneen Carpenter; Jan Crutchfield	Miss Smith Goes to Nashville	1966	
"For Goodness Sake, It's Love"	Connie Smith	Dallas Frazier	If It Ain't Love and Other Great Dallas Frazier Songs	1972	
"Four Walls"	Connie Smith	George Campbell; Marvin Moore	Country Girls Sing Country Songs	1966	
"Gathering Flowers for the Master's Bouquet"	Connie Smith	Marvin E. Baumgardner	Connie's Country	1969	
"Gentle on My Mind"	Connie Smith	John Hartford	Sunshine and Rain	1968	
"Go Ahead and Make Me Cry"	Connie Smith	Lessie Lyle	Miss Smith Goes to Nashville	1966	
"Go Away Stranger"	Connie Smith	June Carter	Born to Sing	1966	
"Go Tell It on the Mountain"	Connie Smith	Traditional	Joy to the World	1975	
"God Is Abundant"	Connie Smith	Marie Boyer	God Is Abundant	1973	
"God Will"	Connie Smith and Nat Stuckey	Marijohn Wilkin; John D. Loudermilk	Sunday Morning with Nat Stuckey and Connie Smith	1970	
"Gone"	Connie Smith	Smokey Rodgers	Born to Sing	1966	
"Gone Too Far"	Connie Smith	Jack Ripley	Back in Baby's Arms	1969	
"Gotta Lotta Blues to Lose"	Connie Smith	Jim Gateley	Connie's Country	1969	
"Great Judgement Morning"	George Jones featuring Connie Smith, Waylon Jennings, Jessi Colter, Ricky Skaggs, Travis Tritt, and Marty Stuart	Bert Shadduck	Amazing Grace	2013	
"Happy Birthday"	Loretta Lynn and Connie Smith	Ron Kitson	Legends of the Grand Ole Opry: Loretta Lynn Singing Her Early Hits Live!	2008	
"Happy Street"	Connie Smith	Ben Peters	Connie's Country	1969	
"Haunted Heart"	Connie Smith	Buck Owens	Born to Sing	2001	
"He Did It All for Me"	Connie Smith	Duane Allen; Sager Powell	God Is Abundant	1973	
"He Is My Everything"	Connie Smith	Dallas Frazier	Just One Time	1971	
"He Set Me Free"	Connie Smith	Albert E. Brumley	Connie Smith Sings Great Sacred Songs	1966	
"He Touched Me"	Connie Smith	Bill Gaither	Come Along and Walk with Me	1971	
"He Touched Me"	Connie Smith	Bill Gaither	The Lost Tapes	2015	
"He Turned the Water Into Wine"	Connie Smith and Nat Stuckey	Johnny Cash	Sunday Morning with Nat Stuckey and Connie Smith	1970	
"He Was There All the Time"	Connie Smith	Gary S. Paxton	Clinging to a Saving Hand	1995	
"He's Alive"	Connie Smith, Sharon White, and Barbara Fairchild	Ann Ballard	Love Never Fails	2003	
"He's All I Got"	Connie Smith	Gary U.S. Bonds; Jerry Williams Jr.	Just for What I Am	2012	
"Heart, We Did All That We Could"	Connie Smith	Ned Miller	The Cry of the Heart	2021	
"Heartbreak Avenue"	Connie Smith	Mel Foree	Sunshine and Rain	1968	
"Hearts Like Ours"	Connie Smith	Connie Smith; Marty Stuart	Connie Smith	1998	
"Hello Darlin'"	Connie Smith	Conway Twitty	Where Is My Castle	1971	
"Help Me"	Connie Smith	Larry Gatlin	God Is Abundant	1973	
"Here Comes My Baby"	Connie Smith	Dottie West; Bill West	Just for What I Am	2012	
"Here Comes My Baby Back Again"	Connie Smith	Connie Smith; Marty Stuart	The Cry of the Heart	2021	
"His Love Takes Care of Me"	Connie Smith and Nat Stuckey	Jimmy Peppers	Sunday Morning with Nat Stuckey and Connie Smith	1970	
"Hold Me Back"	Connie Smith	Chris Waters; Ron Hellard	Single A-side	1986	
"Holdin' On"	Connie Smith	Lee Emerson	Miss Smith Goes to Nashville	1966	
"Holdin' On"	Connie Smith	Lee Emerson	Born to Sing (Note: The 2001 Bear Family box set Born to Sing features an alternate take of "Holdin' On" in addition to the original album version. The alternate take is, however, a different song but with the same title. The alternate take was recorded first.)	2001	
"Home in Heaven"	Connie Smith	Hank Williams	Connie Smith Sings Hank Williams Gospel	1975	
"House Divided"	Connie Smith	Bobby Bare	Cute 'n' Country	1965	
"How Can You Refuse Him Now"	Connie Smith	Hank Williams	Connie Smith Sings Hank Williams Gospel	1975	
"How Great Thou Art"	Connie Smith	Stuart K. Hine	Back in Baby's Arms	1969	
"How Great Thou Art"	Connie Smith	Stuart K. Hine	Live in Branson, MO, USA	1993	
"How Great Thou Art"	Connie Smith	Stuart K. Hine	Clinging to a Saving Hand	1995	
"How Great Thou Art"	Connie Smith	Stuart K. Hine	The Lost Tapes	2015	
"How Long"	Connie Smith	Connie Smith; Harlan Howard; Marty Stuart	Connie Smith	1998	
"How Much Lonelier Can Lonely Be"	Connie Smith	Dallas Frazier	Sunshine and Rain	1968	
"How Sweet It Is"	Connie Smith	Dallas Frazier; Sanger D. Shafer	Ain't We Havin' Us a Good Time	1972	
"I Ain't Never"	Connie Smith	Mel Tillis; Webb Pierce	Just for What I Am	2012	
"I Can Stand It (As Long as He Can)"	Connie Smith	Mitchell Torok; Ramona Redd	Cute 'n' Country	1965	
"I Can Turn Your World Around"	Connie Smith	Harry Ebner; Jack Rhodes; Billie Jo Spears	Cute 'n' Country	1965	
"I Can't Believe You've Stopped Loving Me"	Connie Smith	Dallas Frazier; A.L. Owens	Where Is My Castle	1971	
"I Can't Get Used to Being Lonely"	Connie Smith	Melba Montgomery	Back in Baby's Arms	1969	
"I Can't Remember"	Connie Smith	Bill Anderson; Bette Anderson	Cute 'n' Country	1965	
"I Don't Believe That's How You Feel"	Connie Smith	Harlan Howard; Kostas	Long Line of Heartaches	2011	
"I Don't Have Anyplace to Go"	Connie Smith	Bill Anderson	Miss Smith Goes to Nashville	1966	
"I Don't Know Why I Keep Loving You"	Connie Smith	Fred Carter Jr.	Born to Sing	1966	
"I Don't Love You Anymore"	Connie Smith	Bill Anderson	Connie Smith	1965	
"I Don't Want Talk It Over Anymore"	Connie Smith	Eddy Raven	I Don't Wanna Talk It Over Anymore	1976	
"I Don't Want to Be Free"	Connie Smith	Paul Craft	Pure Connie Smith	1977	
"I Don't Want to Be with Me"	Connie Smith	Mickey Jaco	Just One Time	1971	
"I Don't Want Your Memories (I Just Want You)"	Connie Smith	Dallas Frazier	Single A-side	1973	
"I Got a Lot of Hurtin' Done Today"	Connie Smith	Sanger D. Shafer	I Got a Lot of Hurtin' Done Today / I've Got My Baby on My Mind	1975	
"I Got You"	Connie Smith and Nat Stuckey	Ricci Mareno; Gordon Galbraith	Young Love	1969	
"I Just Don't Believe Me Anymore"	Connie Smith	Dallas Frazier; Glenn Ashworth	The Cry of the Heart	2021	
"I Just Had You on My Mind"	Connie Smith	Sue Richards	I Never Knew (What That Song Meant Before)	1974	
"I Just Want to Be Your Everything"	Connie Smith	Barry Gibb	New Horizons	1978	
"I Know You're Going Away"	Connie Smith	Dallas Frazier	Ain't We Havin' Us a Good Time	1972	
"I Love Charley Brown"	Connie Smith	Dallas Frazier	I Love Charley Brown	1968	
"I Love You Drops"	Connie Smith	Bill Anderson	Connie Smith Sings Bill Anderson	1967	
"I Love You More and More Everyday"	Connie Smith	Don Robertson	Just One Time	1971	
"I Love You More and More Everyday"	Connie Smith	Don Robertson	Just for What I Am (Note: The 2012 Bear Family box set Just for What I Am features an alternate take of "I Love You More and More Everyday" in addition to the original album version.)	2012	
"I Love You So Much It Hurts Me"	Floyd Tillman with Connie Smith	Floyd Tillman	The Influence	2004	
"I Never Knew (What That Song Meant Before)"	Connie Smith	Sanger D. Shafer	I Never Knew (What That Song Meant Before)	1974	
"I Never Once Stopped Loving You"	Connie Smith	Bill Anderson; Jan Howard	I Never Once Stopped Loving You	1970	
"I Never Once Stopped Loving You"	Connie Smith	Bill Anderson; Jan Howard	The Best of Connie Smith	1989	
"I Never Once Stopped Loving You"	Connie Smith	Bill Anderson; Jan Howard	Once a Day	1991	
"I Never Once Stopped Loving You"	Connie Smith	Bill Anderson; Jan Howard	Live in Branson, MO, USA	1993	
"I Never Once Stopped Loving You"	Connie Smith	Bill Anderson; Jan Howard	By Request	1995	
"I Never Once Stopped Loving You"	Connie Smith	Bill Anderson; Jan Howard	The Lost Tapes	2015	
"I Overlooked an Orchid"	Connie Smith	Carl Story; Carl Smith; Shirley Lyn	Connie in the Country	1967	
"I Run to You"	Marty Stuart with Connie Smith	Marty Stuart; Connie Smith	Ghost Train: The Studio B Sessions	2010	
"I Saw a Man"	Connie Smith	Arthur Smith	Connie Smith Sings Great Sacred Songs	1966	
"I Saw a Man"	Connie Smith	Arthur Smith	Clinging to a Saving Hand	1995	
"I Saw the Light"	Connie Smith	Hank Williams	Connie Smith Sings Hank Williams Gospel	1975	
"I Still Feel the Same About You"	Connie Smith	Bill Anderson	I Got a Lot of Hurtin' Done Today / I've Got My Baby on My Mind	1975	
"I Thought of You"	Connie Smith	Jimmy Rollins	Cute 'n' Country	1965	
"I Will"	Connie Smith	Dick Glasser	Born to Sing	1966	
"I Wish We'd All Been Ready"	Connie Smith	Larry Norman	I Never Knew (What That Song Meant Before)	1974	
"I Wonder If the Angels Could Use Another Singer"	Connie Smith	Dottie Rambo	I Don't Wanna Talk It Over Anymore	1976	
"I Wouldn't Take Nothin' for My Journey Now"	Connie Smith	Charles R. Goodman; Jimmie Davis	Connie Smith Sings Great Sacred Songs	1966	
"I'd Rather Be a Fool"	Connie Smith	Joe Williams	Born to Sing	2001	
"I'd Rather Believe in You"	Connie Smith	Michael Omartian; Stormie Omartian	The Best of Connie Smith	1989	
"I'd Still Want to Serve Him Today"	Connie Smith	Ray Lewis	Come Along and Walk with Me	1971	
"I'll Be There (If You Ever Want Me)"	Connie Smith	Rusty Gabbard; Ray Price	Cute 'n' Country	1965	
"I'll Come Runnin'"	Connie Smith	Connie Smith	The Best of Connie Smith	1967	
"I'll Come Runnin'"	Connie Smith	Connie Smith	Born to Sing (Note: The 2001 Bear Family box set Born to Sing features two alternate takes of "I'll Come Runnin'" in addition to the original album version.)	2001	
"I'll Fly Away"	Connie Smith	Albert E. Brumley	I Never Once Stopped Loving You	1970	
"I'll Love You Enough (For Both of Us)"	Connie Smith	Ray Griff	Connie's Country	1969	
"I'll Love You Enough (For Both of Us)"	Connie Smith	Ray Griff	Born to Sing (Note: The 2001 Bear Family box set Born to Sing features an alternate take of "I'll Love You Enough (For Both of Us)" in addition to the original album version.)	2001	
"I'll Never Get Over Loving You"	Connie Smith	Connie Smith	Miss Smith Goes to Nashville	1966	
"I'll Share My World with You"	Connie Smith and Nat Stuckey	Ben Wilson	Young Love	1969	
"I'll Still Be Missing You"	Connie Smith	Warner McPherson	I Never Knew (What That Song Meant Before)	1974	
"I'm All Wrapped Up in You"	Connie Smith	Don Gibson	I Don't Wanna Talk It Over Anymore	1976	
"I'm Ashamed of You"	Connie Smith	Bill Anderson	Connie Smith	1965	
"I'm Gonna Sing"	Connie Smith	Hank Williams	Connie Smith Sings Hank Williams Gospel	1975	
"I'm in the Middle of a Losin' Streak"	Connie Smith	Sanger D. Shafer	The Best of Connie Smith	1977	
"I'm Little But I'm Loud"	Connie Smith	Jimmy Dickens; Boudleaux Bryant	Connie in the Country	1967	
"I'm Not Over You"	Connie Smith	Carl Jackson; Melba Montgomery	The Cry of the Heart	2021	
"I'm So Blue"	Connie Smith	Kostas; Marty Stuart; Connie Smith	Long Line of Heartaches	2011	
"(I'm So) Afraid of Losing You Again"	Connie Smith	Dallas Frazier; A.L. Owens	I Never Once Stopped Loving You	1970	
"I'm So Glad"	Connie Smith	Ted Harris	Connie Smith Now	1974	
"I'm So Used to Loving You"	Connie Smith	Conway Twitty	Where Is My Castle	1971	
"I'm Sorry If My Love Got in Your Way"	Connie Smith	Dallas Frazier; A.L. Owens	Single A-side	1971	
"I'm Your Woman"	Connie Smith	Jean Chapel	Soul of Country Music	1967	
"I've Got My Baby on My Mind"	Connie Smith	Sanger D. Shafer	I Got a Lot of Hurtin' Done Today / I've Got My Baby on My Mind	1975	
"I've Got My Baby on My Mind"	Connie Smith	Sanger D. Shafer	Live in Branson, MO, USA	1993	
"If God Is Dead (Who's That Living in My Soul)"	Connie Smith and Nat Stuckey	Lawrence Reynolds	Sunday Morning with Nat Stuckey and Connie Smith	1970	
"If God Is Dead (Who's That Living in My Soul)"	Connie Smith	Lawrence Reynolds	Ain't We Havin' Us a Good Time	1972	
"If I Could Just Get Over You"	Connie Smith	Kay Arnold	Love Is the Look You're Looking For	1973	
"If I Talk to Him"	Connie Smith	Priscilla Mitchell; Dolores Edgin	Miss Smith Goes to Nashville	1966	
"If I Talk to Him"	Connie Smith	Priscilla Mitchell; Dolores Edgin	Live in Branson, MO, USA	1993	
"If I Talk to Him"	Connie Smith	Priscilla Mitchell; Dolores Edgin	The Best of Connie Smith	1989	
"If It Ain't Love (Let's Leave It Alone)"	Connie Smith	Dallas Frazier	If It Ain't Love and Other Great Dallas Frazier Songs	1972	
"If It Ain't Love (Let's Leave It Alone)"	Connie Smith	Dallas Frazier	Once a Day	1991	
"If It Ain't Love (Let's Leave It Alone)"	Connie Smith	Dallas Frazier	Live in Branson, MO, USA	1993	
"If It Ain't Love (Let's Leave It Alone)"	Connie Smith	Dallas Frazier	By Request	1995	
"If It Ain't Love (Let's Leave It Alone)"	Connie Smith	Dallas Frazier	The Lost Tapes	2015	
"If My Heart Had Windows"	Connie Smith	Dallas Frazier	I Never Once Stopped Loving You	1970	
"If Teardrops Were Silver"	Connie Smith	Don Wayne	Soul of Country Music	1967	
"If That Ain't Strong Enough"	Connie Smith and Dallas Frazier	Dallas Frazier	If It Ain't Love and Other Great Dallas Frazier Songs	1972	
"If the Whole World Stopped Lovin'"	Connie Smith	Ben Peters	I Love Charley Brown	1968	
"If We Want Love to Last"	Connie Smith	L. E. White	Ain't We Havin' Us a Good Time	1972	
"If You Leave Me Tonight I'll Cry"	Connie Smith	Hal Mooney; Gerald Sanford	Just for What I Am	2012	
"If You Were Mine to Lose"	Connie Smith	Mickey Jaco	Just One Time	1971	
"If You Won't Tell"	Connie Smith	Dallas Frazier	Miss Smith Goes to Nashville	1966	
"In Case You Ever Change Your Mind"	Connie Smith	Bill Anderson	Connie Smith Sings Bill Anderson	1967	
"In Gethsemane"	Connie Smith, Sharon White, and Barbara Fairchild	Sue Smith; Gina Vera	Love Never Fails	2003	
"In My Sweet Baby's Arms"	Connie Smith	Dallas Frazier; A.L. Owens	Miss Smith Goes to Nashville	1966	
"In the Garden"	Connie Smith	C. Austin Miles	Connie Smith Sings Great Sacred Songs	1966	
"(In the Valley) He Restoreth My Soul"	Connie Smith	Dottie Rambo	Come Along and Walk with Me	1971	
"Invisible Tears"	Connie Smith	Ned Miller; Sue Miller	Born to Sing	1966	
"Is This All You Hear (When a Heart Breaks)"	Connie Smith	Charlie Williams	I Never Knew (What That Song Meant Before)	1974	
"It Ain't That Way"	George Hamilton IV with Connie Smith	Dale Siegenthaler	Songs of Faith and Inspiration	2003	
"It Comes and Goes"	Connie Smith	Bill Anderson	Connie Smith Sings Bill Anderson	1967	
"It Only Hurts for a Little While"	Connie Smith	Mack David; Fred Spielman	Soul of Country Music	1967	
"It Pleases Me to Please You"	Connie Smith	Dave Loggins	Pure Connie Smith	1977	
"It'll Be Easy"	Connie Smith	Jan Crutchfield	Downtown Country	1967	
"It's Gonna Rain Today"	Connie Smith	Dallas Frazier	Downtown Country	1967	
"It's Just My Luck"	Connie Smith	Betty Sue Perry	Connie Smith	1965	
"It's Not Easy to Say Goodbye"	Connie Smith	Dewayne Orender	New Horizons	1978	
"It's Not the End of Everything"	Connie Smith	Bill Anderson	Connie Smith Sings Bill Anderson	1967	
"It's Now or Never"	Connie Smith	Aaron Schroeder; Wally Gold	Downtown Country	1967	
"It's Such a Pretty World Today"	Connie Smith	Dale Noe	Soul of Country Music	1967	
"J'imaginais Autrement L'amour" (Note: French language version of "More to Love Than This".)	Connie Smith	Hank Mills transl. by Pierre Delanoë	Connie Smith Chante En Français	1966	
"Jesus"	Connie Smith	Bill Gaither	A Lady Named Smith	1973	
"Jesus Died for Me"	Connie Smith	Hank Williams	Connie Smith Sings Hank Williams Gospel	1975	
"Jesus Hears, He Cares, He Can"	Connie Smith	Ray Lewis	The Song We Fell in Love To	1976	
"Jesus Is Calling"	Connie Smith	Hank Williams; Charlie Monroe	Connie Smith Sings Hank Williams Gospel	1975	
"Jesus Is Your Ticket to Heaven"	Connie Smith	Archie Jordan	The Best of Connie Smith	1989	
"Jesus Remembered Me"	Connie Smith	Hank Williams	Connie Smith Sings Hank Williams Gospel	1975	
"Jesus, Take a Hold"	Connie Smith	Merle Haggard	Where Is My Castle	1971	
"Jesus, Take a Hold"	Connie Smith	Merle Haggard	The Cry of the Heart	2021	
"Joy to the World"	Connie Smith	Traditional	Joy to the World	1975	
"Just a Closer Walk with Thee"	Connie Smith	Traditional	Connie Smith Sings Great Sacred Songs	1966	
"Just a Little Bit of You"	Connie Smith	Dallas Frazier	Just for What I Am	2012	
"Just a Little Sunshine in the Rain"	Connie Smith	Ricci Mareno	Sunshine and Rain	1968	
"Just for What I Am"	Connie Smith	Dallas Frazier; A.L. Owens	Ain't We Havin' Us a Good Time	1972	
"Just for What I Am"	Connie Smith	Dallas Frazier; A.L. Owens	The Best of Connie Smith	1989	
"Just for What I Am"	Connie Smith	Dallas Frazier; A.L. Owens	Once a Day	1991	
"Just for What I Am"	Connie Smith	Dallas Frazier; A.L. Owens	Live in Branson, MO, USA	1993	
"Just for What I Am"	Connie Smith	Dallas Frazier; A.L. Owens	The Lost Tapes	2015	
"Just for What I Am"	Anna Wilson with Connie Smith	Dallas Frazier; A.L. Owens	Countrypolitan Duets	2011	
"Just Let Me Know"	Connie Smith	Connie Smith; Marty Stuart	Connie Smith	1998	
"Just One Time"	Connie Smith	Don Gibson	Just One Time	1971	
"Just One Time"	Connie Smith	Don Gibson	The Best of Connie Smith	1989	
"Just One Time"	Connie Smith	Don Gibson	Once a Day	1991	
"Just One Time"	Connie Smith	Don Gibson	Live in Branson, MO, USA	1993	
"Just One Time"	Connie Smith	Don Gibson	By Request	1995	
"Just One Time"	Connie Smith	Don Gibson	The Lost Tapes	2015	
"Keep on Holding to Those Nail Scarred Hands"	Connie Smith	Henry Slaughter	Connie Smith Sings Great Sacred Songs	1966	
"L'amour N'excuse Pas" (Note: French language version of "Love Is No Excuse".)	Connie Smith	Justin Tubb transl. by Pierre Saka	Connie Smith Chante En Français	1966	
"Le Jour Et La Nuit"	Connie Smith	Jean Bernard; Pierre Saka	Connie Smith Chante En Français	1966	
"Let It Be Me"	Connie Smith and Nat Stuckey	Mann Curtis; Gilbert Bécaud; Pierre Delanoë	Young Love	1969	
"Let Me Help You Work It Out"	Connie Smith	Jerry Foster	I Love Charley Brown	1968	
"Let's All Go Down to the River"	Connie Smith	Earl Montgomery; Sue Richards	A Lady Named Smith	1973	
"Letting Go"	Connie Smith	Glenn Martin; Dave Kirby	I Never Knew (What That Song Meant Before)	1974	
"Little Things"	Connie Smith	Willie Nelson; Shirley Nelson	I Love Charley Brown	1968	
"Living Without You (Is Too Much to Live With)"	Connie Smith	Dallas Frazier	If It Ain't Love and Other Great Dallas Frazier Songs	1972	
"Lonesome"	Connie Smith	Connie Smith; Marty Stuart	Connie Smith	1998	
"Long Black Limousine"	Connie Smith	Vern Stovall; Bobby George	Back in Baby's Arms	1969	
"Long Black Limousine"	Connie Smith	Vern Stovall; Bobby George	Once a Day	1991	
"Long Black Limousine"	Connie Smith	Vern Stovall; Bobby George	The Lost Tapes	2015	
"Long Line of Heartaches"	Connie Smith	Marty Stuart; Connie Smith	Long Line of Heartaches	2011	
"Look Out Heart"	Connie Smith	Marty Stuart; Harry Stinson	The Cry of the Heart	2021	
"Looking for a Reason"	Connie Smith	Connie Smith; Curtis Wright	Connie Smith	1998	
"Loose Talk"	John Prine with Connie Smith	Freddie Hart; Ann Lucas	In Spite of Ourselves	1999	
"Louisiana Man"	Connie Smith	Doug Kershaw	I Never Once Stopped Loving You	1970	
"Louisiana Man"	Connie Smith	Doug Kershaw	Once a Day	1991	
"Louisiana Man"	Connie Smith	Doug Kershaw	Live in Branson, MO, USA	1993	
"Louisiana Man"	Connie Smith	Doug Kershaw	The Lost Tapes	2015	
"Love Don't Care (Where It Grows)"	Connie Smith	Tupper Saussy	I Don't Wanna Talk It Over Anymore	1976	
"Love Has a Mind of Its Own"	Connie Smith	Dallas Frazier	Just One Time	1971	
"Love Held on to Me"	Connie Smith	Helen Cornelius	A Lady Named Smith	1973	
"Love Is No Excuse"	Connie Smith	Justin Tubb	Cute 'n' Country	1965	
"Love Is the Look You're Looking For"	Connie Smith	Rose Lee Maphis	Love Is the Look You're Looking For	1973	
"Love Never Fails"	Connie Smith, Sharon White, and Barbara Fairchild	Dave Clark; Wayne Haun; Jerry Salley	Love Never Fails	2003	
"Love's Gonna Live Here"	Connie Smith	Buck Owens	Connie in the Country	1967	
"Love's Not Everything"	Connie Smith	Connie Smith; Marty Stuart	Connie Smith	1998	
"Lovin' One Day at a Time"	Connie Smith	Kenny Walker	Pure Connie Smith	1977	
"Lovin' You Baby"	Connie Smith	Troy Seals; Jo Ann Campbell Seals	New Horizons	1978	
"Lovin' You, Lovin' Me"	Connie Smith	Sonny Throckmorton	Single A-side	1979	
"Loving You (Has Changed My Whole Life)"	Connie Smith	Don Gibson	I Got a Lot of Hurtin' Done Today / I've Got My Baby on My Mind	1975	
"Loving You Sure Has Been Good to Me"	Connie Smith	Dallas Frazier; Earl Montgomery	New Horizons	1978	
"Meet Me in Heaven"	Janette Carter with Johnny Cash, June Carter Cash, Earl Scruggs, Connie Smith, Marty Stuart, and Darrin Vincent	Johnny Cash	Kindred Spirits: A Tribute to the Songs of Johnny Cash	2002	
"More to Love Than This"	Connie Smith	Hank Mills	Cute 'n' Country	1965	
"My Ecstasy"	Connie Smith	Dallas Frazier	If It Ain't Love and Other Great Dallas Frazier Songs	1972	
"My Heart Has a Mind of Its Own"	Connie Smith	Howard Greenfield; Jack Keller	Downtown Country	1967	
"My Heart Was the Last One to Know"	Connie Smith	Kris Kristofferson; Shel Silverstein	Just for What I Am	2012	
"My Little Corner of the World"	Connie Smith	Bob Hilliard; Lee Pockriss	Born to Sing	1966	
"My Own Peculiar Way"	Connie Smith	Willie Nelson	Downtown Country	1967	
"My Part of Forever"	Connie Smith	Jerry Foster; Bill Rice	Long Line of Heartaches	2011	
"My Uncle Abel"	Connie Smith	Billy Edd Wheeler	That's the Way Love Goes	1974	
"My Whole World Is Falling Down"	Connie Smith	Bill Anderson; Jerry Crutchfield	Connie Smith Sings Bill Anderson	1967	
"Natchilly Ain't No Good"	Connie Smith	Jerry Reed Hubbard	Sunshine and Rain	1968	
"Never Having You"	Connie Smith	Tom T. Hall	I Never Knew (What That Song Meant Before)	1974	
"Never Love Again"	Connie Smith	Rusty Kershaw; Doug Kershaw	A Lady Named Smith	1973	
"Nobody But a Fool (Would Love You)"	Connie Smith	Bill Anderson	Miss Smith Goes to Nashville	1966	
"Nobody But a Fool (Would Love You)"	Connie Smith	Bill Anderson	Live in Branson, MO, USA	1993	
"Nobody But a Fool (Would Love You)"	Connie Smith	Bill Anderson	The Best of Connie Smith	1989	
"Not 'Til You Come Back to Me"	Connie Smith	Bill Anderson	Cute 'n' Country	1965	
"Nothing in This World"	Connie Smith	Don Gibson	The Song We Fell in Love To	1976	
"Now"	Connie Smith	Paul Parnes; Herb Strizik	Back in Baby's Arms	1969	
"Now Lord, What Can I Do for You"	Connie Smith and Nat Stuckey	Ira Louvin; Anne Young	Sunday Morning with Nat Stuckey and Connie Smith	1970	
"O Come All Ye Faithful"	Connie Smith	Traditional	Joy to the World	1975	
"O Holy Night"	Connie Smith	Traditional	Joy to the World	1975	
"On and On and On"	Connie Smith	Bill Anderson	Connie Smith Sings Bill Anderson	1967	
"Once a Day"	Connie Smith	Bill Anderson	Connie Smith	1965	
"Once a Day"	Connie Smith	Bill Anderson	The Song We Fell in Love To	1976	
"Once a Day"	Connie Smith	Bill Anderson	The Best of Connie Smith	1989	
"Once a Day"	Connie Smith	Bill Anderson	Once a Day	1991	
"Once a Day"	Connie Smith	Bill Anderson	Live in Branson, MO, USA	1993	
"Once a Day"	Connie Smith	Bill Anderson	By Request	1995	
"Once a Day"	Connie Smith	Bill Anderson	The Lost Tapes	2015	
"One Day at a Time"	Connie Smith	Marijohn Wilkin; Kris Kristofferson	Clinging to a Saving Hand	1995	
"One Little Reason"	Connie Smith	Clyde Pitts; Cile Davis	The Song We Fell in Love To	1976	
"One More Time"	Connie Smith	Larry Butler; Jan Crutchfield; Buddy Killen	Just One Time	1971	
"Only for Me"	Connie Smith	Liz Anderson	The Best of Connie Smith, Volume II	1970	
"Only Mama That'll Walk the Line"	Connie Smith	Ivey J. Bryant Jr. Steve Stone	Sunshine and Rain	1968	
"Over the Next Hill We'll Be Home"	Connie Smith	Johnny Cash	Voice of the Spirit, Gospel of the South	2006	
"Pain of a Broken Heart"	Connie Smith	Connie Smith; Marty Stuart	Long Line of Heartaches	2011	
"Paper Roses"	Connie Smith	Fred Spielman; Janice Torre	Born to Sing	1966	
"Pas Souvent" (Note: French language version of "Once a Day".)	Connie Smith	Bill Anderson transl. by Pierre Delanoë	Connie Smith Chante En Français	1966	
"Pass Me By (If You're Only Passing Through)"	Connie Smith	Hillman Hall	A Lady Named Smith	1973	
"Peace in the Valley"	Connie Smith	Thomas A. Dorsey	Clinging to a Saving Hand	1995	
"Peace in the Valley"	Connie Smith	Thomas A. Dorsey	Opry Legends: Gospel Favorites (Note: This recording of "Peace in the Valley" is titled "There Will Be Peace in the Valley for Me".)	2012	
"Plenty of Time"	Connie Smith	Clay McLean	Come Along and Walk with Me	1971	
"Po' Folks"	Connie Smith	Bill Anderson	Country Girls Sing Country Songs	1966	
"Praying Hands"	Connie Smith	Don Gibson	I Got a Lot of Hurtin' Done Today / I've Got My Baby on My Mind	1975	
"Reach for the Stars"	Connie Smith, Sharon White, and Barbara Fairchild	Jerry Salley; Jeff Silvey	Love Never Fails	2003	
"Remind Me, Dear Lord"	Connie Smith	Dottie Rambo	God Is Abundant	1973	
"Ribbon of Darkness"	Connie Smith	Gordon Lightfoot	Connie's Country	1969	
"Ride, Ride, Ride"	Connie Smith	Liz Anderson	Downtown Country	1967	
"Ridin' on a Rainbow"	Connie Smith	Dallas Frazier; Larry Lee	The Song We Fell in Love To	1976	
"Rings of Gold"	Connie Smith and Nat Stuckey	Gene Thomas	Young Love	1969	
"Rough at the Edges"	Connie Smith	Buddy Buie; Dean Daughtry	"Don't Make Me Dream (If Dreamin' Can't Come True)" B-side	1983	
"Run Away Little Tears"	Connie Smith	Dallas Frazier	I Love Charley Brown	1968	
"Run Away Little Tears"	Connie Smith	Dallas Frazier	Live in Branson, MO, USA	1993	
"Same as Mine"	Connie Smith	Marge Barton	Miss Smith Goes to Nashville	1966	
"Satisfied"	Connie Smith	Martha Carson	Connie Smith Sings Great Sacred Songs	1966	
"Satisfied"	Connie Smith	Martha Carson	Live in Branson, MO, USA	1993	
"Satisfied"	Connie Smith	Martha Carson	Clinging to a Saving Hand	1995	
"Scrapbook"	Connie Smith	Tupper Saussy	Pure Connie Smith	1977	
"Searching (For Someone Like You)"	Connie Smith	Pee Wee Maddux	I Got a Lot of Hurtin' Done Today / I've Got My Baby on My Mind	1975	
"Seattle"	Connie Smith	Ernie Sheldon; Jack Keller	Connie's Country	1969	
"Secret Place"	Connie Smith, Sharon White, and Barbara Fairchild	Ann Downing; Jeff Silvey	Love Never Fails	2003	
"Senses"	Connie Smith	Glen Campbell; Jeannie Seely	Cute 'n' Country	1965	
"Senses"	Jeannie Seely featuring Connie Smith and Marty Stuart	Glen Campbell; Jeannie Seely	Written in Song	2017	
"Silent Night"	Connie Smith	Joseph Mohr; Franz Xaver Gruber	Joy to the World	1975	
"Silent Night"	Connie Smith and Willie Nelson	Joseph Mohr; Franz Xaver Gruber	The Nashville Christmas Album (Note: This recording of "Silent Night" is titled "Silent Night, Holy Night".)	1986	
"Slowly"	Connie Smith	Tommy Hill; Webb Pierce	Connie in the Country	1967	
"Smooth Sailin'"	Connie Smith	Sonny Throckmorton; Curly Putman	Single A-side	1978	
"So Sad (To Watch Good Love Go Bad)"	Connie Smith	Don Everly	I Don't Wanna Talk It Over Anymore	1976	
"So Sad (To Watch Good Love Go Bad)"	John Prine with Connie Smith	Don Everly	In Spite of Ourselves	1999	
"Softly and Tenderly	Connie Smith	Will L. Thompson	Clinging to a Saving Hand	1995	
"Someone to Give My Love To"	Connie Smith	Jerry Foster; Bill Rice	Connie Smith Now	1974	
"Something Pretty"	Connie Smith and Nat Stuckey	Charles P. Williams; Wayne Stokes	Young Love	1969	
"Soul Song"	Connie Smith	George Richey; Norro Wilson; Billy Sherrill	A Lady Named Smith	1973	
"Sound of Different Drums"	Connie Smith	Harlan Howard	Connie's Country	1969	
"Spare Me No Truth Tonight"	Connie Smith	Connie Smith; Marty Stuart	The Cry of the Heart	2021	
"Stand by Me"	Connie Smith and Nat Stuckey	Tompall Glaser	Young Love	1969	
"Storms Never Last"	Connie Smith	Jessi Colter	I Don't Wanna Talk It Over Anymore	1976	
"Strange"	Connie Smith	Pat White; Curly Fox	Born to Sing	1966	
"Sunday Morning"	Connie Smith and Nat Stuckey	Van Trevor; Dick Heard	Sunday Morning with Nat Stuckey and Connie Smith	1970	
"Sundown on My Mind"	Connie Smith	Dallas Frazier	Sunshine and Rain	1968	
"Sunshine Blue"	Connie Smith	Bill Graham	I Got a Lot of Hurtin' Done Today / I've Got My Baby on My Mind	1975	
"Sunshine of My World"	Connie Smith	Dallas Frazier	I Love Charley Brown	1968	
"Surely"	Connie Smith	Peggy Whittington	Soul of Country Music	1967	
"Sweet Little Jesus Boy"	Connie Smith	Robert MacGimsey	Joy to the World	1975	
"Sweet Memory"	Connie Smith	Dallas Frazier; A.L. Owens	Just for What I Am	2012	
"Take Me Back"	Connie Smith	Teddy Randazzo	Just for What I Am	2012	
"Take My Hand"	Connie Smith	Diane Berry	Long Line of Heartaches	2011	
"Talk to Me Lonesome Heart"	Larry Stephenson featuring Connie Smith and Marty Stuart	James O'Gwynn	20th Anniversary (Note: The album features a bluegrass version and a country version of "Talk to Me Lonesome Heart".)	2010	
"Ten Thousand and One"	Connie Smith	Pat Bunch; Danny Mitchell	"Lovin' You, Lovin' Me" B-side	1979	
"That Makes Two of Us"	Connie Smith	Kostas; Patty Loveless; Emory Gordy Jr.	Long Line of Heartaches	2011	
"That's What Loving You Can Do"	Connie Smith	Don Gibson	Pure Connie Smith	1977	
"Teddy Bear Song"	Connie Smith	Don Earl; Nick Nixon	That's the Way Love Goes	1974	
"Tell Another Lie"	Connie Smith	Fred Wise; Randy Starr; Christian Bruhn	Connie Smith	1965	
"Thank You for Loving Me"	Connie Smith	Dallas Frazier; A.L. Owens	Ain't We Havin' Us a Good Time	1972	
"Thanks a Lot for Trying, Anyway"	Connie Smith	Jim Glaser	That's the Way Love Goes	1974	
"That's All This Old World Needs"	Connie Smith	Demetrius Tapp; Bob Tubert	I Love Charley Brown	1968	
"That's the Way Love Goes"	Connie Smith	Sanger D. Shafer; Lefty Frizzell	That's the Way Love Goes	1974	
"That's What It's Like to Be Lonesome"	Connie Smith	Bill Anderson	Connie Smith Sings Bill Anderson	1967	
"That's What Lonesome Is"	Connie Smith	Bill Anderson	Connie Smith Sings Bill Anderson	1967	
"The Baptism of Jesse Taylor"	Connie Smith	Dallas Frazier; Sanger D. Shafer	God Is Abundant (Note: This recording of "The Baptism of Jesse Taylor" would later be included on Smith's 1974 album That's the Way Love Goes.)	1973	
"The Bridge of Love"	Connie Smith	Dallas Frazier; A.L. Owens	Come Along and Walk with Me	1971	
"The Call"	Connie Smith	Cy Coben	Back in Baby's Arms	1969	
"The Deepening Snow"	Connie Smith	Harlan Howard	Sunshine and Rain	1968	
"The Deepening Snow"	Connie Smith	Harlan Howard	By Request	1995	
"The First Noel"	Connie Smith	Traditional	Joy to the World	1975	
"The Golden Streets of Glory"	Connie Smith	Dolly Parton	God Is Abundant	1973	
"The Hinges on the Door"	Connie Smith	Baker Knight	Connie Smith	1965	
"The House Where Love Shines"	Connie Smith	Dallas Frazier	A Lady Named Smith	1973	
"The Hurt Goes On"	Connie Smith	Sheb Wooley	Sunshine and Rain	1968	
"The Hurtin's All Over"	Connie Smith	Harlan Howard	Downtown Country	1967	
"The Hurtin's All Over"	Connie Smith	Harlan Howard	The Best of Connie Smith	1989	
"The Hurtin's All Over"	Connie Smith	Harlan Howard	Grand Ole Opry Live Classics: Great Ladies of the Opry	2006	
"The Key's in the Mailbox"	Connie Smith	Harlan Howard	I Never Knew (What That Song Meant Before)	1974	
"The Key's in the Mailbox"	Connie Smith	Harlan Howard	By Request	1995	
"The Last Letter"	Connie Smith	Rex Griffin	Soul of Country Music	1967	
"The Latest Shade of Blue"	Connie Smith	Eddy Raven	I Don't Wanna Talk It Over Anymore	1976	
"The Laying on of Hands"	Connie Smith and Dallas Frazier	Dallas Frazier	If It Ain't Love and Other Great Dallas Frazier Songs	1972	
"The Little Drummer Boy"	Connie Smith	Harry Simeone; Katherine K. Davis; Henry Onorati	Joy to the World	1975	
"The Night Has a Thousand Eyes"	Connie Smith	Ben Weisman; Dorothy Wayne; Marilyn Garret	Downtown Country	1967	
"The Other Side of You"	Connie Smith	William B. Morgan	Connie Smith	1965	
"The Prayer of the Drunkard's Little Girl"	Connie Smith	Alfred Reed	Always Lift Him Up: A Tribute to Blind Alfred Reed	2007	
"The Race Is On"	Connie Smith	Don Rollins	The Lost Tapes	2015	
"The Song We Fell in Love To"	Connie Smith	Tupper Saussy; Ray Baker	The Song We Fell in Love To	1976	
"The Street Where the Lonely Walk"	Connie Smith	Gladness Jennings	Come Along and Walk with Me	1971	
"The Sun Shines Down on Me"	Connie Smith	Larry Lee	I Never Once Stopped Loving You	1970	
"The Threshold"	Connie Smith	Bill Anderson; Chuck Goddard	Connie Smith	1965	
"The Twelfth of Never"	Connie Smith	Jerry Livingston; Paul Francis Webster	Born to Sing	2001	
"The Wayfaring Pilgrim"	Connie Smith	Traditional	Connie Smith Sings Great Sacred Songs	1966	
"The Wayward Wind"	Connie Smith	Herb Newman; Stanley Lebowsky	New Horizons	1978	
"The Wedding Cake"	Connie Smith	Margaret Lewis; Myra Smith	Back in Baby's Arms	1969	
"The Wonders You Perform"	Connie Smith	Jerry Chesnut	That's the Way Love Goes	1974	
"Them Ole Rainy Lovesick Songs (Are Hitting' Home)"	Connie Smith	Dallas Frazier; A.L. Owens	I Never Knew (What That Song Meant Before)	1974	
"Then and Only Then"	Connie Smith	Bill Anderson	Connie Smith	1965	
"Then and Only Then"	Connie Smith	Bill Anderson	Live in Branson, MO, USA	1993	
"Then and Only Then"	Connie Smith	Bill Anderson	The Best of Connie Smith	1989	
"Then and Only Then"	Connie Smith	Bill Anderson	Grand Ole Opry Live Classics: Great Ladies of the Opry	2006	
"There Are Some Things"	Connie Smith	Betty Anderson; Red Hayes	I Love Charley Brown	1968	
"There Goes My Everything"	Connie Smith	Dallas Frazier	Soul of Country Music	1967	
"There'll Never Be Another for Me"	Connie Smith	Dan Seals; John Ford Coley; Parker McGee	New Horizons	1978	
"There's Something Lonely in This House"	Connie Smith	Lola Jean Dillon	I Never Once Stopped Loving You	1970	
"Think I'll Go Somewhere (And Cry Myself to Sleep)"	Connie Smith	Bill Anderson	I Never Once Stopped Loving You	1970	
"This Precious Love (We Know)"	Connie Smith	Dallas Frazier	Ain't We Havin' Us a Good Time	1972	
"Three Sides"	Connie Smith	Monty Holmes; Connie Smith	The Cry of the Heart	2021	
"Tie a Yellow Ribbon Round the Ole Oak Tree"	Connie Smith	Irwin Levine; L. Russell Brown	That's the Way Love Goes	1974	
"(Till) I Kissed You"	Connie Smith	Don Everly	The Song We Fell in Love To	1976	
"Tiny Blue Transistor Radio"	Connie Smith	Bill Anderson	Connie Smith	1965	
"Tiny Blue Transistor Radio"	Connie Smith	Bill Anderson	Live in Branson, MO, USA	1993	
"Tiny Blue Transistor Radio"	Connie Smith	Bill Anderson	By Request	1995	
"To Chicago with Love"	Connie Smith	Harlan Howard	Sunshine and Rain	1968	
"To Pieces"	Connie Smith	Carl Jackson	The Cry of the Heart	2021	
"Today I Started Loving You Again"	Connie Smith	Merle Haggard; Bonnie Owens	Connie's Country	1969	
"Together Alone"	Connie Smith and Nat Stuckey	Bruce Cockburn	Young Love	1969	
"Too Good to Be True"	Connie Smith	Dallas Frazier	Where Is My Castle	1971	
"Too Good to Be True"	Connie Smith	Dallas Frazier	New Horizons	1978	
"Too Many Rivers"	Connie Smith	Harlan Howard	Back in Baby's Arms	1969	
"Too Much to Gain to Lose"	Connie Smith	Dottie Rambo	Come Along and Walk with Me	1971	
"Too Soon to Know"	Connie Smith	Don Gibson	A Lady Named Smith	1973	
"Touch My Heart"	Connie Smith	Johnny Paycheck; Aubrey Mayhew	Soul of Country Music	1967	
"Trouble Me No More"	Connie Smith, Sharon White, and Barbara Fairchild	Mary Funderburk; Daryl Williams	Love Never Fails	2003	
"Turn Your Radio On"	Connie Smith	Albert E. Brumley	Just for What I Am	2012	
"Two Empty Arms"	Connie Smith	Bill Anderson	Cute 'n' Country	1965	
"Two Together"	Connie Smith and Nat Stuckey	Nat Stuckey	Young Love	1969	
"Unmitigated Gall"	Dawn Sears featuring Connie Smith	Mel Tillis	Dawn Sears	2002	
"Until My Dreams Come True"	Connie Smith	Dallas Frazier	Just for What I Am	2012	
"Viva La Love"	Connie Smith	Dallas Frazier	The Song We Fell in Love To	1976	
"Wait for a Light to Shine"	Connie Smith	Fred Rose	Just One Time	1971	
"Walk Me to the Door"	Connie Smith	Conway Twitty	"Hold Me Back" B-side	1986	
"Walk Me to the Door"	Connie Smith	Conway Twitty	By Request	1995	
"Walk Out Backwards"	Connie Smith	Bill Anderson	Connie Smith Sings Bill Anderson	1967	
"Walk Through This World with Me"	Connie Smith	Sandy Seamons; Kay Savage	Soul of Country Music	1967	
"Walk Through This World with Me"	Connie Smith	Sandy Seamons; Kay Savage	Born to Sing (Note: The 2001 Bear Family box set Born to Sing features an alternate take of "Walk Through This World with Me" in addition to the original album version.)	2001	
"Walkin' Through the Fire"	Connie Smith, Sharon White, and Barbara Fairchild	Marty Stuart; Jerry Sullivan	Love Never Fails	2003	
"Walking My Lord Up Calvary's Hill"	Marty Stuart & His Fabulous Superlatives featuring Connie Smith	Ruby Moody	The Gospel Music of Marty Stuart and His Fabulous Superlatives	2014	
"Way Up on the Mountain"	Connie Smith and Nat Stuckey	Ira Louvin; Anne Young	Sunday Morning with Nat Stuckey and Connie Smith	1970	
"Way Up on the Mountain"	Connie Smith	Ira Louvin; Anne Young	Ain't We Havin' Us a Good Time	1972	
"We're Gonna Hold On"	Connie Smith	Earl Montgomery; George Jones	That's the Way Love Goes	1974	
"We've Got Love"	Tommy Cash and Connie Smith	Earl Bud Lee; Sam Hogin	The 25th Anniversary Album	1990	
"Well, It's All Right"	Connie Smith and Nat Stuckey	Cindy Walker	Sunday Morning with Nat Stuckey and Connie Smith	1970	
"Well of His Mercy"	Connie Smith	Wayne Manning	God Is Abundant	1973	
"What Ain't to Be, Just Might Happen"	Connie Smith	Porter Wagoner	Just for What I Am	2012	
"What Child Is This"	Connie Smith	Traditional	Joy to the World	1975	
"What Child Is This"	Connie Smith	Traditional	Christmas in Branson, MO, USA	1993	
"What Makes a Man Wander"	Connie Smith	Harlan Howard	Sunshine and Rain	1968	
"What Would I Do Without You"	Connie Smith	Cy Coben	Back in Baby's Arms	1969	
"What Would You Give in Exchange for Your Soul"	Bobby Osborne & the Rocky Top X-Press featuring Marty Stuart and Connie Smith	F.J. Berry	Bluegrass & Beyond	2009	
"When a House Is Not a Home"	Connie Smith	Roger Miller	Where Is My Castle	1971	
"When God Dips His Love in My Heart"	Connie Smith	Cleavant Derricks	Connie Smith Sings Great Sacred Songs	1966	
"When I Get to Glory (Sing, Sing, Sing)"	Connie Smith	Hank Williams	Clinging to a Saving Hand	1995	
"When I Need Jesus He's There"	Connie Smith	Lee Petrucci	The Song We Fell in Love To	1976	
"When I Sing for Him"	Connie Smith	Porter Wagoner	God Is Abundant	1973	
"When It Comes to You"	Connie Smith	Connie Smith; Marty Stuart	Connie Smith	1998	
"When It's Just You and Me"	Connie Smith	Kenny O'Dell	Pure Connie Smith	1977	
"When the Book of Life Is Read"	Connie Smith	Hank Williams	Connie Smith Sings Hank Williams Gospel	1975	
"When You Hurt Me More Than I Love You"	Connie Smith	Jerry Foster; Bill Rice	A Lady Named Smith	1973	
"Where Angels Fear to Tread"	Connie Smith, Sharon White, and Barbara Fairchild	Ron Hendrix; Bobby Price; Jerry Salley	Love Never Fails	2003	
"Where Could I Go But to the Lord"	Connie Smith	James B. Coats	Connie Smith Sings Great Sacred Songs	1966	
"Where Is My Castle"	Connie Smith	Dallas Frazier	Where Is My Castle	1971	
"Where Is My Castle"	Connie Smith	Dallas Frazier	Live in Branson, MO, USA	1993	
"Where Is My Castle"	Connie Smith	Dallas Frazier	The Lost Tapes	2015	
"While Shepherds Watched Their Flocks"	Connie Smith	Traditional	Joy to the World	1975	
"Whispering Hope"	Connie Smith and Nat Stuckey	Alice Hawthorne	Young Love	1969	
"Why Don't You Love Me"	Connie Smith	Hank Williams	I Got a Lot of Hurtin' Done Today / I've Got My Baby on My Mind	1975	
"Why Don't You Love Me"	Connie Smith	Hank Williams	Rare Country Legends Live	2006	
"Why Me"	Connie Smith	Kris Kristofferson	God Is Abundant	1973	
"Will the Real Me Please Stop Crying"	Connie Smith	Bob Tubert	Miss Smith Goes to Nashville	1966	
"Wings of a Dove"	Connie Smith	Bob Ferguson	Connie Smith Sings Great Sacred Songs	1966	
"Workin' on a Road"	Jeff & Sheri Easter featuring Marty Stuart, Connie Smith, and Eddie Stubbs	Lester Flatt; Harry Cox	Expecting Good Things	2010	
"World of Forgotten People"	Connie Smith	Loretta Lynn	Connie in the Country	1967	
"Y'all Come (You All Come)"	Connie Smith	Arlie Duff	Connie in the Country	1967	
"You"	Connie Smith	Jimmy Holder	Connie's Country	1969	
"You Ain't Woman Enough"	Connie Smith	Loretta Lynn	Connie in the Country	1967	
"You and Love and I"	Connie Smith	Sanger D. Shafer; Warren Robb	Pure Connie Smith	1977	
"You and Me"	Connie Smith	Marty Stuart; Connie Smith	Long Line of Heartaches	2011	
"You and Only You"	Connie Smith	Robbie Bowen	Born to Sing	2001	
"You and Your Sweet Love"	Connie Smith	Bill Anderson	The Best of Connie Smith, Volume II (Note: This recording of "You and Your Sweet Love" would later be included on Smith's 1970 album I Never Once Stopped Loving You.)	1970	
"You and Your Sweet Love"	Connie Smith	Bill Anderson	Once a Day	1991	
"You Are Gone"	Connie Smith	Johnny Carver	Sunshine and Rain	1968	
"You Can Move That Mountain"	Connie Smith	Daniel Lee	God Is Abundant	1973	
"You Can't Take Back a Teardrop"	Connie Smith	Chris Waters; Tom Shapiro	Connie Smith	1998	
"You Crossed My Mind a Thousand Times Today"	Connie Smith	K. Phyllis Powell; Dewayne Orender	I Don't Wanna Talk It Over Anymore	1976	
"You Don't Have Very Far to Go"	Connie Smith	Merle Haggard; Red Simpson	Connie's Country	1969	
"You Light Up My Life"	Connie Smith	Joe Brooks	New Horizons	1978	
"You'll See Jesus"	Connie Smith	Eddy Raven	I Got a Lot of Hurtin' Done Today / I've Got My Baby on My Mind	1975	
"You're Gettin' Heavy on My Mind"	Connie Smith	Dallas Frazier	If It Ain't Love and Other Great Dallas Frazier Songs	1972	
"You've Got Me (Right Where You Want Me)"	Connie Smith	George Richey; Connie Smith	A Lady Named Smith	1973	
"You've Got Me (Right Where You Want Me)"	Connie Smith	George Richey; Connie Smith	Live in Branson, MO, USA	1993	
"You've Got Me (Right Where You Want Me)"	Connie Smith	George Richey; Connie Smith	By Request	1995	
"Young Love"	Connie Smith and Nat Stuckey	Ric Cartey; Carole Joyner	Young Love	1969	
"Your Light"	Connie Smith	Connie Smith; Allen Shamblin; Marty Stuart	Connie Smith	1998	
"Your Mem'ry Comes Along"	Connie Smith	Paul Tannen; Johnny Tillotson	Downtown Country	1967	
"Your Smiling Face"	Connie Smith	James Taylor	New Horizons	1978	
"Yours Love"	Connie Smith and Nat Stuckey	Harlan Howard	Young Love	1969	
