= Connie Smith's Greatest Hits, Vol. I =

Greatest hits album by Connie Smith
- Released: October 1973
- Recorded: 1964 – 1972
- Studio: RCA Victor Studios
- Genre: Country
- Label: RCA Victor
- Producer: Bob Ferguson

Connie Smith chronology
Dream Painter (1973)	Connie Smith's Greatest Hits, Vol. I (1973)	God Is Abundant (1973)

Connie Smith's Greatest Hits, Vol. I is a compilation album by American country singer Connie Smith, released in October 1973 by RCA Victor. The album was one of several compilations released following Smith's departure from RCA Victor. It included ten of Smith's most popular singles from her career, such as the number one single, "Once a Day", and top ten single, "The Hurtin's All Over". The album charted on the American country LP's chart in 1973 and received a positive review from Billboard magazine.

== Background and content ==
Connie Smith reached her peak commercial success at the RCA Victor label. Between 1964 and 1973, she had 18 top ten singles on the Billboard country chart, beginning with her eight week number one single titled "Once a Day". Smith left the label in 1973 and moved to Columbia Records the same year. After leaving RCA's roster, the label issued several compilation LP's of Smith's previously released material. Among these albums was Connie Smith's Greatest Hits, Vol. I. The album contained a total of ten tracks, all of which had been previously released as singles. Nine of the ten tracks were originally top ten Billboard country singles for Smith, such as "Just One Time", "The Hurtin's All Over", "Cincinnati, Ohio" and "Just for What I Am". All tracks were recorded between 1964 and 1972 at the RCA Victor Studios in sessions produced by Bob Ferguson.

== Release and reception ==
Connie Smith's Greatest Hits, Vol. I was released on RCA Victor in October 1973. It was distributed as a vinyl LP, with five songs on each side of the record. It was the fifth compilation of Smith's material that was released by RCA Victor. The disc debuted on the American Billboard Country LP's chart on November 3, 1973. It spent seven weeks on the chart, reaching number 39 on March 9, 1974. The disc received a positive review from Billboard magazine, which reviewed the compilation shortly after its release. "This shows, perhaps better than anything, her maturity as a singer over the years, but even in the formative years she was outstanding," the publication concluded.

== Track listing ==
Side one
No.	Title	Writer(s)	Original album	Length
1.	"Just One Time"	Don Gibson	Just One Time	2:29
2.	"The Hurtin's All Over"	Harlan Howard	Downtown Country	2:48
3.	"Just for What I Am"	Dallas Frazier; Arthur Leo Owens	Ain't We Havin' Us a Good Time	2:24
4.	"Once a Day"	Bill Anderson	Connie Smith	2:17
5.	"Cincinnati, Ohio"	Anderson	Connie Smith Sings Bill Anderson	2:10

Side two
No.	Title	Writer(s)	Original album	Length
1.	"Ribbon of Darkness"	Marty Robbins	Connie's Country	2:38
2.	"Where Is My Castle"	Frazier; Owens	Where Is My Castle	2:40
3.	"I'll Come Runnin'"	Connie Smith	The Best of Connie Smith	2:05
4.	"Baby's Back Again"	Betty Jean Robinson	I Love Charley Brown	2:15
5.	"Run Away Little Tears"	Frazier	I Love Charley Brown	2:27

== Chart performance ==
Chart (1973–1974)	Peak position
US Top Country Albums (Billboard)	39

== Release history ==
Region	Date	Format	Label	Ref.
North America	October 1973	Vinyl	RCA Victor Records	
United Kingdom	October 1973	Vinyl	RCA Victor Records	
Japan	1979	Vinyl	RCA Country Music Best Selection	
