= Live in Branson, MO, USA =

Live album by Connie Smith
- Released: 1993
- Recorded: October 13, 1992 (Branson, Missouri)
- Genre: Country, Gospel
- Length: 34:05
- Label: Laserlight
- Producer: Ralph Jungheim

Connie Smith chronology
Greatest Hits on Monument (1993)	Live in Branson, MO, USA (1993)	By Request (1995)

Professional ratings
Review scores
Source	Rating
Allmusic	3/5 stars

Live in Branson, MO, USA is a live album by American country music artist, Connie Smith. The album was released in 1993 on Laserlight Records and was produced by Ralph Jungheim. It was Smith's first official album (other than compilations) since 1978's New Horizons.

== Background ==
Live in Branson, MO, USA was Connie Smith's first live album. The album was recorded at a theater in Branson, Missouri October 13, 1992. The album consisted of nine tracks, which also included a ten-minute medley of her hits. Seven of the album's tracks were Smith's hits, including her #1 single, "Once a Day," and four other recordings from Smith's years at RCA Victor Records. The album also includes two singles from her years at Columbia Records: "You've Got Me (Right Where You Want Me)" and "I've Got My Baby on My Mind." In addition, the album featured two Gospel songs, "How Great Thou Art" and a cover of Martha Carson's "Satisfied."

The album was reviewed by Allmusic critic, Dan Cooper, who gave the release three out of five stars. A full description of the release was not included.

== Track listing ==
No.	Title	Writer(s)	Length
1.	"I've Got My Baby On My Mind"	Sanger D. Shafer	2:31
2.	"Where Is My Castle"	Dallas Frazier	2:44
3.	"Just One Time"	Don Gibson	2:45
4.	"Louisiana Man"	Doug Kershaw	2:50
5.	"You've Got Me (Right Where You Want Me)"	George Richey; Connie Smith	3:56
6.	"Medley: Just for What I Am / Run Away Little Tears / Nobody But a Fool (Would Love You) / Tiny Blue Transistor Radio / Then and Only Then / I Never Once Stopped Loving You / If It Ain't Love (Let's Leave It Alone) / If I Talk to Him / Ain't Had No Lovin' / Cincinnati, Ohio"	Frazier; A.L. Owens; Bill Anderson; Jan Howard; Priscilla Mitchell; Dolores Edgin	9:59
7.	"Once a Day"	Anderson	2:48
8.	"Satisfied"	Martha Carson	3:16
9.	"How Great Thou Art"	Stuart K. Hine	4:25

== Personnel ==
- Jimmy Capps – guitar
- Rod Ham – bass
- Mark Pearman – fiddle
- Connie Smith – lead vocals
- Gary Smith – piano
- Jack Smith – steel guitar, leader
- Steve Turner – drums
