= Connie Smith Sings Hank Williams Gospel =

Studio album by Connie Smith
- Released: May 1975
- Recorded: November 4–7, 1974
- Studio: Columbia Studio B
- Genre: Gospel
- Label: Columbia
- Producer: Ray Baker

Connie Smith chronology
| I Got a Lot of Hurtin' Done Today/I've Got My Baby On My Mind (1975) | Connie Smith Sings Hank Williams Gospel (1975) | Joy to the World (1975) |

Connie Smith Sings Hank Williams Gospel is the twenty-fifth solo studio album by American country singer Connie Smith. It was released in May 1975 via Columbia Records and contained 11 tracks. The project was a tribute to Hank Williams and was considered the first tribute gospel album of his material. Smith had found over half of the album's material through previously unreleased recordings. The album would make a brief chart appearance on the American Country LP's survey in 1975.

== Background ==
Connie Smith reached her commercial zenith at the RCA Victor label where she had 18 singles reach the Billboard country songs top ten. She had discovered Christianity, which prompted her to incorporate more gospel music into her repertoire. In 1973, Smith signed a new contract with Columbia Records that allowed her to record one gospel album per year. The label released 1973's God Is Abundant which consisted of relatively new gospel songs. However, no gospel disc was released in 1974 despite Smith's contract agreements. This was due to the label's lack of interest in gospel material and the delay in scheduling due to Smith becoming pregnant.

Two gospel projects were released in 1975 instead, beginning with a tribute disc to Hank Williams. Up until Smith's album, no other notable artist had recorded a collection of Williams's gospel material. Smith and producer Ray Baker were insistent on recording the album. The pair spent significant time at the Acuff-Rose publishing company in Nashville, Tennessee to find gospel material. From searching through Williams's catalog, the pair found a series of lesser-known gospel songs. Smith would later state, "That was my project. I wanted to do that, and they let me, so I was glad."

== Recording and content ==
Smith went into the studio to record the gospel project in the fall of 1974. Specifically, Smith and producer Ray Baker recorded the album over the course of three days: November 4, November 5 and November 7, 1974. The material was recorded at Columbia Studio B, located in Nashville, Tennessee. Smith had been recording at Columbia's studio since signing with the label in 1973. Nearly half of the songs chosen for the project were taken from Hank Williams's posthumous gospel album, I Saw the Light. Remaining tracks had not been as readily accessible to the general public, according to biographer Barry Mazor.

Connie Smith Sings Hank Williams Gospel consisted of 11 tracks, all of which were penned by Williams himself. The album opened with one of Williams's best-known gospel songs, "I Saw the Light". Along with "I Saw the Light", five additional tracks had been originally included on Williams's 1954 I Saw the Light collection: "Jesus Remembered Me", "How Can You Refuse Him Now", "House of Gold", "I'm Gonna Sing" and "Calling You".

Smith and Baker found the six remaining tracks through the Acuff-Rose catalog, which owned Williams's songs at this point. Some of these songs were originally demo recordings Williams made that had not been as accessible to the public. Smith had found the original demos of "Jesus Is Calling", "When the Life of the Book Is Read" and "Are You Walkin' and Talkin' with the Lord". Also featured on the project was the track "House of Gold". Williams's own version of the track would not be released until 1985. According to Smith, the song was among her favorites on the album, although she found it challenging to sing: "I always loved 'House of Gold'. And it was hardest for me to sing, because of the range of it. I had to go into falsetto.

== Release and reception ==
Connie Smith Sings Hank Williams Gospel was released in May 1975 on Columbia Records. It was the twenty seventh studio album released in Smith's career. The disc was distributed as a vinyl LP, containing six songs on "side A" and five songs on "side B". The disc debuted on the American Billboard Country LP's chart on May 31, 1975. Spending three weeks on the chart, the disc only peaked at number 47 by June 7, 1975. Smith and Baker later theorized that the album was not successful because Columbia Records did little to promote or distribute it. "I don't think they promoted gospel records like they should have," Smith commented in 2021. The album later received a positive response from writers Mary A. Bufwack and Robert K. Oermann, who called it "one of her greatest moments on disc". In 1976, the album was nominated for Best Gospel Music Performance by the Grammy Awards.

== Track listing ==
All songs composed by Hank Williams except where noted.

Side one
| No. | Title | Writer(s) | Length |
|---|---|---|---|
| 1. | "I Saw the Light" | | 2:00 |
| 2. | "Home in Heaven" | | 2:47 |
| 3. | "Jesus Remembered Me" | | 2:42 |
| 4. | "How Can You Refuse Him Now" | | 2:58 |
| 5. | "Jesus Is Calling" | Charlie Monroe; Williams | 1:39 |
| 6. | "When the Book of Light Is Read" | | 2:34 |

Side two
| No. | Title | Length |
|---|---|---|
| 1. | "Are You Walking and Talking for the Lord" | 2:32 |
| 2. | "House of Gold" | 2:29 |
| 3. | "I'm Gonna Sing Sing" | 2:29 |
| 4. | "Calling You" | 3:10 |
| 5. | "Jesus Died for Me" | 2:12 |

== Personnel ==
All credits are adapted from the liner notes of Connie Smith Sings Hank Williams Gospel and the biography booklet by Barry Mazor titled The Latest Shade of Blue.

Musical personnel

- Carol Lee Cooper – Organ
- Ray Edenton – Rhythm guitar
- Johnny Gimble – Fiddle
- Lloyd Green – Steel guitar
- The Jordanaires – Background vocals
- Kenny Malone – Drums
- Grady Martin – Guitar, leader
- Charlie McCoy – Harmonica
- Bob Moore – Electric bass
- Leon Rhodes – Guitar, bass guitar
- Hargus "Pig" Robbins – Piano
- Connie Smith – Lead vocals
- Buddy Spicher – Fiddle
- Bobby Thompson – Guitar
- Chip Young – Guitar

Technical personnel

- Ray Baker – Percussion, producer
- Charlie Bradley – Engineer
- Lou Bradley – Engineer
- Slick Lawson – Photography
- Rob Reynolds – Engineer

== Accolades ==
| Year | Nominee / work | Award | Result | Ref. |
|---|---|---|---|---|
| 1976 | 17th Annual Grammy Awards | Best Gospel Music Performance | Nominated | |

== Chart performance ==
| Chart (1975) | Peak position |
|---|---|
| US Top Country Albums (Billboard) | 47 |

== Release history ==
| Region | Date | Format | Label | Ref. |
|---|---|---|---|---|
| Europe | May 1975 | Vinyl | CBS Records International | |
| North America | May 1975 | Vinyl | Columbia Records | |
