= Joy to the World (Connie Smith album) =

Studio album by Connie Smith
- Released: October 1975
- Recorded: August 20 – 22, 1974
- Studio: Columbia Studio B (Nashville, Tennessee)
- Genre: Country; Christmas; religious
- Label: Columbia
- Producer: Ray Baker

Connie Smith chronology
| Connie Smith Sings Hank Williams Gospel (1975) | Joy to the World (1975) | The Song We Fell in Love To (1976) |

Joy to the World is the twenty-sixth solo studio album by American country singer Connie Smith. It was released in October 1975 via Columbia Records and originally contained ten tracks. It was re-released decades later by Real Gone Music to digital sites and featured one new track. The album was Smith's first album of Christmas music.

== Background ==
In the 1970s, Connie Smith moved from RCA Victor to Columbia Records after 18 top ten Billboard country singles. She had discovered Christianity during this period, which prompted Columbia to let her record one gospel album per year. Despite the contract terms, the only gospel collection released was 1973's God Is Abundant. No gospel collection was issued by Columbia in 1974 due to the label's lack of interest and Smith's unexpected time devoted to her pregnancy. Columbia instead issued two gospel albums of Smith's material in 1975, beginning in May with Connie Smith Sings Hank Williams Gospel. It would be followed by her first Christmas album, which would be titled Joy to the World.

Smith had wanted to record a religious set of Christmas material for several years. In her initial contract with Columbia, executive Clive Davis noted that Smith would have the opportunity to record one Christmas collection. According to biographer Barry Mazor, Smith "was not pressured" into cutting pop Christmas tunes. "I wanted a real Christmas album, about the real Christmas. And I wanted the old songs," Smith said. "I can't say I did this for mama, but I knew she would love it!"

== Recording and content ==
Smith recorded Joy to the World one year prior to the album's release. The album was cut over three sessions at Columbia Studio B, located in Nashville, Tennessee: August 20, August 21 and August 22, 1974. All three sessions were produced by Ray Baker, who had recorded Smith's previous three studio albums at Columbia. Three overdub sessions were also added, however, production credits were unknown, according to biographer Barry Mazor. Most of the project's material was dated and in the public domain. Therefore, Smith was credited as an arranger for most of the project's tracks.

A total of ten tracks comprised the original collection. As with previous albums, Smith chose the music. Among the tracks handpicked by her was "O Holy Night" and "What Child Is This?". "There are no better Christmas songs than 'O Holy Night' or 'What Child Is This'," she told Barry Mazor. Another chosen track was "Sweet Little Jesus Boy", which was notably done by gospel performer, Mahalia Jackson. "I wanted to do that one because I was a huge fan of hers, and that she'd done it impressed me so much," recalled Smith in 2021. She initially wanted to record "Little Drummer Boy" in the ballad style of a similar version cut by Ray Price. However, Smith was pressured into making an up-tempo version of the track. "I wound up doing what they [Columbia] wanted, but I've always regretted that I didn't cut it more my way," she told Mazor. A duet version of "Silent Night, Holy Night" was added to the 2017 re-release of Joy to the World. The duet version included Willie Nelson and was first issued on a Christmas compilation in 1986.

== Release and reception ==
Joy to the World was originally released by Columbia Records in October 1975. It was originally distributed as a vinyl LP, containing five songs on either side of the record. It was the twenty eighth studio album of Smith's career and her sixth with Columbia. Upon its initial release, the album attracted little commercial attention. According to biographer Barry Mazor, the album "did not see much circulation either". Smith later theorized, "I don't think they even released it everywhere, and it became one of the rarest ones to find." The only known promotion was done by Billboard, which featured an advertisement of the album and announced its release under the headline of "New LP/Tape Releases". The album was re-released by Real Gone Music on November 3, 2017 as both a compact disc and in a digital format. It was the first Columbia album of Smith's music to be re-released.

== Track listings ==
=== Vinyl version ===
All songs are of traditional origin, except where noted.

Side one
| No. | Title | Writer(s) | Length |
|---|---|---|---|
| 1. | "What Child Is This?" | | 3:34 |
| 2. | "O Holy Night" | | 3:37 |
| 3. | "Go Tell It on the Mountain" | | 2:25 |
| 4. | "The First Noel" | | 2:27 |
| 5. | "Little Drummer Boy" | Katherine K. Davis; Henry Onorati; Harry Simeone | 2:19 |

Side two
| No. | Title | Writer(s) | Length |
|---|---|---|---|
| 1. | "Sweet Little Jesus Boy" | Robert MacGimsey | 3:43 |
| 2. | "Away in a Manger" / "Silent Night" (medley) | | 3:58 |
| 3. | "Joy to the World" | | 2:04 |
| 4. | "O Come All Ye Faithful (Adeste Fideles)" | | 3:18 |
| 5. | "While Shepherds Watched Their Flocks" | | 2:33 |

=== Compact disc and digital versions ===
Joy to the World (Expanded Edition)
| No. | Title | Writer(s) | Length |
|---|---|---|---|
| 1. | "What Child Is This?" | Traditional | 3:38 |
| 2. | "O Holy Night" | Traditional | 3:41 |
| 3. | "Go Tell It on the Mountain" | Traditional | 2:30 |
| 4. | "The First Noel" | Traditional | 2:30 |
| 5. | "Little Drummer Boy" | Davis; Onorati; Simeone | 2:23 |
| 6. | "Sweet Little Jesus Boy" | MacGimsey | 3:47 |
| 7. | "Away in a Manger"/"Silent Night" (medley) | Traditional | 4:01 |
| 8. | "Joy to the World" | Traditional | 2:06 |
| 9. | "O Come All Ye Faithful" | Traditional | 3:21 |
| 10. | "While Shepherds Watched Their Flocks" | Traditional | 2:36 |

Bonus track on CD reissue
| No. | Title | Writer(s) | Length |
|---|---|---|---|
| 11. | "Silent Night, Holy Night" (duet with Willie Nelson) | Franz Xaver Gruber; Joseph Mohr | 4:00 |

== Personnel ==
All credits are adapted from the liner notes of Joy to the World and the biography booklet by Barry Mazor titled The Latest Shade of Blue.

Musical personnel

- Tommy Allsup – Guitar
- Carol Lee Cooper – Organ
- Ray Edenton – Rhythm guitar
- Lloyd Green – Steel guitar
- Shayne Keister – Synthesizer, vibes
- Kenny Malone – Drums
- Grady Martin – Guitar
- Bob Moore – Electric bass
- Hargus "Pig" Robbins – Piano
- Connie Smith – Lead vocals
- Chip Young – Guitar, leader

Technical personnel

- Ray Baker – Percussion, producer
- Carol Lee Cooper – Arranger
- Connie Smith – Arranger

== Release history ==
| Region | Date | Format | Label | Ref. |
|---|---|---|---|---|
| North America | October 1975 | Vinyl | Columbia Records | |
| North America | November 3, 2017 | Compact disc; download; streaming | Real Gone Music | |
