= Long Line of Heartaches =

Studio album by Connie Smith
- Released: August 23, 2011
- Recorded: Nashville, Tennessee
- Genre: Country
- Length: 37:08
- Label: Sugar Hill
- Producer: Marty Stuart

Connie Smith chronology
Love Never Fails (2003)	Long Line of Heartaches (2011)	The Cry of the Heart (2021)

Long Line of Heartaches is the thirty-fifth solo studio album by American country artist Connie Smith. It was released August 23, 2011, through Sugar Hill Records and produced by Smith's husband, Marty Stuart. It is her first album of new solo material since 1998, and her second since 1978.

== Background ==
Long Line of Heartaches was recorded at RCA Victor Records's Studio B, where Smith cut many of her major hit singles for RCA in the 1960s and 70s. The release includes five new songs Smith co-wrote with husband and producer Marty Stuart, and seven written by other country songwriters, including Harlan Howard, Kostas, and Johnny Russell.

The album's official track listing was released in July through Sugar Hill Records.

== Track listing ==
No.	Title	Writer(s)	Length
1.	"Long Line of Heartaches"	Connie Smith, Marty Stuart	2:35
2.	"I'm Not Blue"	Kostas, Smith, Stuart	3:40
3.	"Pain of a Broken Heart"	Smith, Stuart	2:38
4.	"Ain't You Even Gonna Cry"	Johnny Russell	3:01
5.	"I Don't Believe That's How You Feel"	Harlan Howard, Kostas	2:35
6.	"A Heart Like You"	Glenn Ashworth, Dallas Frazier	3:10
7.	"Anymore"	Vic McAlpin, Roy Drusky, Marie Wilson	2:46
8.	"That Makes Two of Us"	Emory Gordy, Jr., Kostas, Patty Loveless	4:07
9.	"You and Me"	Smith, Stuart	2:24
10.	"My Part of Forever"	Jerry Foster, Bill Rice	3:04
11.	"Blue Heartaches"	Smith, Stuart	3:36
12.	"Take My Hand"	Diane Berry	3:32

== Personnel ==
Musicians

- Julie Barnick – background vocals
- Gary Carter – steel guitar
- Ron Ham – background vocals
- Jeanne Hayes – background vocals
- Dirk Johnson – piano
- Paul Martin – bass, vibraphone
- Ric McClure – drums
- Jody Seyfried – background vocals
- Connie Smith – lead vocals
- Marty Stuart – acoustic guitar, electric guitar
- Rick Wright – background vocals, electric guitar, gut string guitar

Technical

- Rob Clark – assistant
- Mick Conley – engineer, mastering, mixing
- Karen Cronin – design
- Marilyn Davis – accounting
- Marc Dottore – management
- Michael Hardesty – assistant
- Russ Harrington – cover photo
- Mat Kraatz – assistant
- Maria Elena Orbean – production coordination
- Thomas Petillo – photography
- Melissa Scheicher – hair stylist, make-up
- Aaron Smith – assistant
- Harry Stinson – videography
- Marty Stuart – producer
- Erick Thompson – assistant
- Stephen Turney – assistant
