= Connie Smith (1998 album) =

Studio album by Connie Smith
- Released: October 6, 1998
- Studio: Hound's Ear; Sound Emporium
- Genre: Country; Honky tonk
- Length: 34:21
- Label: Warner Bros.
- Producer: Marty Stuart; Justin Neibank

Connie Smith chronology
Clinging to a Saving Hand (1995)	Connie Smith (1998)	Love Never Fails (2003)

Connie Smith is thirty-fourth solo studio album by American country singer Connie Smith. It was released on October 6, 1998, via Warner Bros. Records and contained ten tracks. Nine of the songs were penned by Smith herself, along with artist and performer, Marty Stuart. It was Stuart who also produced the album. The eponymous collection was Smith's first mainstream studio album of new material in 20 years. Smith had returned to recording after raising her children while in semi-retirement. The album received a positive response from critics. No singles were released from the album and instead received promotion elsewhere.

== Background ==
Connie Smith had not recorded a studio album of new material since 1978's New Horizons. She had gone into semi-retirement following the ending of her Monument Records contract to raise her three daughters. "I couldn't quit my kids; I couldn't quit my faith, so the only thing I could quit was my country music career," she told biographer Barry Mazor. When Smith's last child left home, she was ready to return to her career completely, which included making a new album. Smith met with Warner/Reprise president, Jim Ed Norman to discuss recording for them. She did several sessions, but none of the material satisfied her. It was then suggested that she work with artist and producer, Marty Stuart. Together, the pair would write songs and record the album, ultimately turning into a romantic relationship between the pair; they later married in 1997.

== Recording and content ==
Smith's eponymous album was recorded in Nashville, Tennessee. The sessions were held at the Hounds Ear studio and the Sound Emporium Studios — both located in Nashville, Tennessee. Stuart served as the album's producer, with assistance from Justin Niebank. Allmusic album reviewer, Thom Jurek, described the album's sound as "tough traditional honky tonk music with an edge that makes it very attractive as a rock & roll record."

A total of ten tracks comprised the collection. Nine out of the ten tracks on the album were co-written by Smith and Stuart. One track, "You Can't Back a Teardrop", was written by Tom Shapiro and Chris Waters. The opening track, "How Long", was composed by Stuart, Smith and Harlan Howard. According to Smith, "How Long" was the first song written for the album. Jurek compared the opening of "You Can't Back a Teardrop" to that of Ray Price's "Crazy Arms," though he went on to say the rest of the song was different from "Crazy Arms" because, "it's on the far honky tonk edge, with Stuart leading the band in a driving, rollicking shuffle where fiddles drive a pedal steel ever toward the center of the pathos in the center of the bridge."

Smith herself compared the album's ninth track, "When It Comes to You" to that of a rock and roll song, stating that she, "yodeled on the end just to be funny, and they kept it in." The ninth track also featured Stuart playing mandolin. The second track, "Lonesome" was also written by Smith and Stuart and was said to resemble, "a bluegrass ghost song about love in the ether," according to Jurek. The closing song on the album, "A Tale from Tahrarrie" is departure from any of the other tracks on the album, as it resembles a Celtic song, according to Smith, stating, "We wanted to write a song that sounded like the 1700s. It came out sounding Irish. I made up the name "Tahrarrie" because it fit the sound."

== Critical reception ==
Professional ratings
Review scores
Source	Rating
Allmusic	4/5 stars

Connie Smith mainly received positive reviews upon its release. Thom Jurek of Allmusic gave the album four out five stars, giving the album's quality much praise, saying, "In all, this is not only a solid effort; it stands head and shoulders over most of the stuff that's come out of Nash Vegas in over a decade. Even if it doesn't sell a copy, it's a triumphant return for Smith. She hasn't lost a whit of her gift as a singer or as a writer." Jurek went on to give it praise, saying, "Connie Smith is a bona fide country and gospel music legend; she is quite literally the only person who deserves to share a reputation with Patsy Cline -- Tammy Wynette and Loretta Lynn notwithstanding." It was also briefly reviewed the book, Country Music: The Rough Guide, which called the effort, "a solid fiddle-and-guitar country that's far gutsier than anything in the Garth-and-Reba mainstream.

== Release ==
The eponymous collection was originally released on October 6, 1998, on Warner Bros. Records. It became the thirty-fifth studio album released in Smith's career and her first with the Warner label. The album was originally distributed as both a compact disc and as a cassette. It was reissued to digital and streaming markets in 2010 via Warner Bros. According to Smith, she was told by country radio that they would not play any songs off the record. Instead, Warner Bros. decided not release any singles off the album to radio. "I don't know if it does her justice to compete in the mainstream," said Warner Bros. senior vice president Bob Saporiti. He added that the album would instead be promoted at National Public Radio and other non-conventional outlets.

== Track listing ==
All tracks written by Connie Smith and Marty Stuart, except where noted.

Connie Smith (CD and digital)
No.	Title	Writer(s)	Length
1.	"How Long"	Harlan Howard; Smith; Stuart	3:07
2.	"Lonesome"		3:21
3.	"Hearts Like Ours"		3:37
4.	"You Can't Take Back A Teardrop"	Tom Shapiro; Chris Waters	2:47
5.	"Looking for a Reason"	Smith; Chris Wright	4:05
6.	"Love's Not Everything"		3:01
7.	"Just Let Me Know"		3:01
8.	"Your Light"	Allen Shamblin; Smith; Stuart	3:11
9.	"When It Comes to You"		2:50
10.	"A Tale From Tahrarrie"		5:21

== Personnel ==
All credits are adapted from the liner notes of Connie Smith and AllMusic.

Musical personnel

- Steve Arnold – bass
- Mark Casstevens – guitar
- Stuart Duncan – fiddle
- Gary Hogue – steel guitar
- Larry Marrs – background vocals, bass
- Michael Rhodes – bass
- Connie Smith – lead vocals
- Gary W. Smith – keyboards
- Stuart Smith – guitar
- Marty Stuart – guitar, mandolin
- Steve Turner – drums
- Biff Watson – guitar
- Cheryl White – background vocals
- Sharon White-Skaggs – background vocals
- Gregg Stocki – drums

Technical personnel

- Holly Gleason – liner notes
- Russ Harrington – photography
- Ken Hutton – assistant engineer
- Glenn Meadows – mastering
- Justin Neibank – engineering, assistant producer
- Garrett Rittenberry – art direction and design
- Marty Stuart – producer

== Release history ==
Region	Date	Format	Label	Ref.
North America	October 6, 1998	Cassette; compact disc	Warner Bros. Records	
North America	February 16, 2010	Music download; streaming	Warner Bros. Records	
