= If It Ain't Love and Other Great Dallas Frazier Songs =

"If It Ain't Love" and Other Great Dallas Frazier Songs

Studio album by Connie Smith
- Released: July 1972
- Recorded: April 10 – 21, 1972
- Studio: RCA Victor Studios
- Genre: Country
- Label: RCA Victor
- Producer: Bob Ferguson

Connie Smith chronology
Ain't We Havin' Us a Good Time (1972)	"If It Ain't Love" and Other Great Dallas Frazier Songs (1972)	Love Is the Look You're Looking For (1973)

Singles from "If It Ain't Love" and Other Great Dallas Frazier Songs
- 1. "If It Ain't Love (Let's Leave It Alone)" Released: July 1972

"If It Ain't Love" and Other Great Dallas Frazier Songs is nineteenth solo studio album by American country singer Connie Smith, released in July 1972 by RCA Victor. The album is a collection of songs composed by songwriter Dallas Frazier. Three of these songs were duets between Smith and Frazier himself. The album's title track was spawned as a single in 1972 and reached the top ten of the American country chart. The album itself reached the top 20 of the American country LP's chart and it received a positive review from Billboard magazine.

== Background ==
Since 1964, Connie Smith had been signed to the RCA Victor record label. She reached her commercial zenith with a series of uninterrupted top ten country singles between 1964 and 1968. After becoming a Christian in 1968, Smith's professional outlook changed and she began incorporating more gospel music into her repertoire. Following 1968, her secular singles were less successful although she continued reaching the top ten of the country charts. In 1972, she had her most successful year of the decade with three top ten hits including "If It Ain't Love (Let's Leave It Alone)".

"If It Ain't Love" was composed by songwriter Dallas Frazier and would inspire the name of her next album project. Smith had previously recorded a series of Frazier-penned songs and the two became close friends. Their musical friendship inspired Smith to record a tribute studio album dedicated to Frazier. "I've only had two albums like this – George Jones Sings Dallas Frazier, and this, from Connie, and my goodness, to have the best male country singer and the best female country singer do an album of my songs, that's quite a privilege," Frazier later commented.

== Recording and content ==
Smith went into the studio to record the tracks for the project on April 10, April 11, April 19, and April 21, 1972. Three overdub sessions were also added that featured a vocal chorus backed by the Nashville Edition vocal group. The sessions were held at the RCA Victor Studios, located in Nashville, Tennessee under the production of Bob Ferguson. Three songs on the album were duets between Smith and Frazier: "If That Ain't Strong Enough", "The Laying on of Hands" and "Bringin' It Home". In 2012, Smith recalled, "It was so easy to sing with Dallas, and so fun! Dallas has that rock 'n' roll edge to his singing, and when he sings he sings like that he means it, with all of his heart!" Including the three duets, all ten tracks on the project were composed by Frazier.

The title track was upbeat song that featured a fiddle solo from Nashville session musician, Johnny Gimble. Smith would later state that the song was among her favorite recordings. Per Smith's request, the album credited Gimble on fiddle, along with the remainder of the project's session musicians. "At the time they didn't list the musicians on the records much, although they did give their names on some albums," she explained. Several more album tracks were also recorded in an upbeat country style, including the three duets between the pair. Several ballads were also part of the project, such as "Living Without You (Is Too Much to Live With)". Smith's religious beliefs prompted her to include gospel songs on her secular project. The duet "The Laying on of Hands" was the track that included a gospel story line.

== Release and reception ==
"If It Ain't Love" (And Other Great Dallas Frazier Songs) was originally released in July 1972 on RCA Victor. The album marked the twenty first studio collection released in Smith's career. It was also Smith's second studio album to be dedicated to a songwriter who penned her material. Her first was 1967's Connie Smith Sings Bill Anderson. RCA originally distributed the disc as a vinyl LP, containing five tracks on either side of the record. Several decades later, the album was reissued by Sony Music Entertainment in a digital format. In July 1972, Billboard magazine gave the album a positive review, calling the pairing between Frazier and Smith "dynamite". Reviewers highlighted the songs "My Ecstasy" and the title track positively in their review. The disc entered the American Billboard country LP's chart in July 1972 and spent 11 weeks on the chart, peaking at number 14. It was Smith second to last album to reach the Billboard top 20. The title track was spawned as a single from the disc in July 1972 by RCA Victor. The single spent 15 weeks on the Billboard Hot Country Songs and climbed to the number seven position. It was Smith's seventeenth top ten song in her career. In Canada, the single reached number 14 on the RPM Country chart.

== Track listings ==
All songs composed by Dallas Frazier.

=== Vinyl version ===
Side one
No.	Title	Length
1.	"If It Ain't Strong Enough" (duet with Dallas Frazier)	2:36
2.	"My Ecstasy"	2:51
3.	"If It Ain't Love (Let's Leave It Alone)"	2:29
4.	"Living Without You (Is Too Much to Live With)"	2:53
5.	"The Laying on of Hands" (duet with Dallas Frazier)	2:29

Side two
No.	Title	Length
1.	"You're Gettin' Heavy on My Mind"	2:50
2.	"Don't Tell Him That I'm Still Crying"	2:40
3.	"For Goodness Sake, It's Love"	2:03
4.	"Everything's Found a Home with Me (But You)"	2:16
5.	"Bringin' It Home" (duet with Dallas Frazier)	2:52

=== Digital version ===
If It Ain't Love and Other Great Dallas Frazier Songs (download and streaming)
No.	Title	Length
1.	"If It Ain't Strong Enough" (with Dallas Frazier)	2:38
2.	"My Ecstasy"	2:53
3.	"If It Ain't Love (Let's Leave It Alone)"	2:31
4.	"Living Without You (Is Too Much to Live With)"	2:54
5.	"The Laying on of Hands" (with Dallas Frazier)	2:30
6.	"You're Gettin' Heavy on My Mind"	2:53
7.	"Don't Tell Him That I'm Still Crying"	2:42
8.	"For Goodness Sake, It's Love"	2:05
9.	"Everything's Found a Home with Me (But You)"	2:19
10.	"Bringin' It Home" (with Dallas Frazier)	2:55

== Personnel ==
All credits are adapted from the liner notes of "If It Ain't Love" (And Other Great Dallas Frazier Songs) and the biography booklet by Barry Mazor titled Just for What I Am.

Musical personnel

- Jimmy Capps – Electric guitar
- Jerry Carrigan – Drums
- Dallas Frazier – Guest artist
- Johnny Gimble – Fiddle
- David Kirby – Electric guitar, leader
- Len Miller – Drums
- Bob Moore – Electric bass
- Weldon Myrick – Steel guitar
- The Nashville Edition – Background vocals
- Dick Overbey – Steel guitar
- Dean Porter – Rhythm guitar
- Hargus "Pig" Robbins – Piano
- Billy Sanford – Electric guitar
- Jerry Shook – Electric guitar
- Carol Rodgers-Snow – Organ
- Connie Smith – Lead vocals
- Henry Strzelecki – Electric bass
- Jerry Whitehurst – Piano
- Chip Young – Rhythm guitar

Technical personnel

- Ray Baker – Liner notes
- Bob Ferguson – Producer
- Bill Grein – Cover photo
- Mike Shockley – Recording technician
- Bill Vandevort – Recording engineer

== Chart performance ==
Chart (1972)	Peak position
US Top Country Albums (Billboard)	14

== Release history ==
Region	Date	Format	Label	Ref.
North America	July 1972	Vinyl	RCA Victor Records	
United Kingdom	July 1972	Vinyl	RCA Victor Records	
North America	2010s	Music download; streaming	Sony Music Entertainment	
