= Sunshine and Rain =

Studio album by Connie Smith
- Released: October 1968
- Recorded: May 1967 – July 1968
- Studio: RCA Victor Studio
- Genre: Country; country pop
- Label: RCA Victor
- Producer: Bob Ferguson

Connie Smith chronology
I Love Charley Brown (1968)	Sunshine and Rain (1968)	Connie's Country (1969)

Sunshine and Rain is the eleventh studio album by American country singer Connie Smith, released in October 1968 by RCA Victor. Sunshine and Rain featured an assortment of both new material and covers of songs by other country artists. The album reached the top 40 of the American country albums chart and received a favorable review from Billboard magazine following its release.

== Background ==
Connie Smith was at the peak of her career in the mid-1960s with a series of uninterrupted top ten country singles. This was launched with her 1964 debut single, "Once a Day", which topped the country songs chart for eight weeks and brought a string of top ten singles in the years that followed. The RCA label issued ten studio albums of Smith's material between 1965 and 1968. String instrumentation was brought onto her tenth studio album to give it a more country pop sound. This sound would continue with her eleventh album, Sunshine and Rain.

== Recording and content ==
The recording sessions for Sunshine and Rain took place between May 1967 and July 1968 at the RCA Victor Studio in Nashville, Tennessee. The sessions were produced by Bob Ferguson, Smith's longtime producer at RCA Victor. A total of 12 tracks comprised the collection. Several new recordings were part of the album, including two cuts penned by Dallas Frazier: "How Much Lonelier Can Lonely Be" and "Sundown of My Mind". Other new recordings included the Harlan Howard-penned "To Chicago with Love", which featured a spoken recitation by Smith. She also cut Howard's original tune, "The Deepening Snow", which she found at the Tree Publishers songwriting company. The song has since been one of Smith's most requested songs in her catalog.

The album also featured covers of songs first recorded by other artists. "Nat'chilly Ain't No Good" was composed by Jerry Reed but was first released as a single by his wife, Priscilla Mitchell. Although Smith felt it to be "different from most of what I do", she ultimately told Bob Ferguson that it "would be fun" to record. The album also features a female cover of Glen Campbell's "Gentle on My Mind" and Waylon Jennings's "Only Daddy That'll Walk the Line". Smith recounted only recording the latter song because of a guitar solo performed by Wayne Moss, whom she got to play on her own record. "I did it in a different key than Waylon so that was work for Wayne, but he did it!" Smith also cut Jan Howard's (wife of Harlan Howard) "What Makes a Man Wander".

== Release and reception ==
Sunshine and Rain was originally released in October 1968 on the RCA Victor label. It her eleventh studio album and tenth with RCA Victor. The album was originally released as a vinyl LP, with six songs on either side. Decades later, it was re- released digitally and on streaming services through Sony Music Entertainment . Following its initial release, Billboard magazine gave the album a positive response in their November 1968 issue. Reviewers praised the "heartbreak" material included on the project and highlighted the tracks "The Hurt Goes On", "How Much Lonelier Can Lonely Be", and "The Deepening Snow". Sunshine and Rain spent ten weeks on the American Billboard Top Country Albums chart, peaking at number 32 in January 1969. It was Smith's lowest peaking album up to that point in her career and her second to miss the top 20.

== Track listings ==
=== Vinyl version ===
Side one
No.	Title	Writer(s)	Length
1.	"Natchilly Ain't No Good"	Jerry Reed Hubbard	2:37
2.	"The Deepening Snow"	Harlan Howard	3:18
3.	"You Are Gone"	Johnny Carver	2:12
4.	"The Hurt Goes On"	Sheb Wooley	2:46
5.	"To Chicago with Love"	Harland Howard	2:36
6.	"Gentle on My Mind"	John Hartford	2:54

Side two
No.	Title	Writer(s)	Length
1.	"Only Mama That'll Walk the Line"	Ivy J. Bryant	2:18
2.	"Heartbreak Avenue"	Mel Foree	2:25
3.	"What Makes a Man Wander"	Howard	2:43
4.	"Sundown of My Mind"	Dallas Frazier	2:15
5.	"How Much Lonelier Can Lonely Be"	Frazier	2:26
6.	"Just a Little Sunshine in the Rain"	Ricci Mareno	2:22

=== Digital version ===
Sunshine and Rain (download and streaming)
No.	Title	Writer(s)	Length
1.	"Natchilly Ain't No Good"	Hubbard	2:39
2.	"The Deepening Snow"	Howard	3:22
3.	"You Are Gone"	Carver	2:17
4.	"The Hurt Goes On"	Wooley	2:48
5.	"To Chicago with Love"	Howard	2:39
6.	"Gentle on My Mind"	Hartford	2:55
7.	"Only Mama That'll Walk the Line"	Bryant	2:26
8.	"Heartbreak Avenue"	Foree	2:26
9.	"What Makes a Man Wander"	Howard	2:46
10.	"Sundown of My Mind"	Frazier	2:18
11.	"How Much Lonelier Can Lonely Be"	Frazier	2:33
12.	"Just a Little Sunshine in the Rain"	Mareno	2:24

== Personnel ==
All credits are adapted from the liner notes of Sunshine and Rain and the biography booklet by Barry Mazor titled Just for What I Am.

Musical personnel

- Byron Bach – cello
- Brenton Banks – violin
- Howard Carpenter – viola
- Jerry Carrigan – drums
- Dorothy Dillard – background vocals
- Bobby L. Dyson – electric bass
- Ray Edenton – guitar
- Johnny Gimble – fiddle
- Solie Fott – violin
- Buddy Harman – drums
- Russ Hicks – steel guitar
- Priscilla Hubbard – background vocals
- Lillian Hunt – violin
- Charles Justice – fiddle
- Martin Katahn – violin
- John Kline – viola
- Shelly Kurland – violin
- Charlie McCoy – electric bass, harmonica
- Piere Menard – violin
- Weldon Myrick – steel guitar
- Louis Nunley – background vocals
- Dean Porter – guitar
- Hargus "Pig" Robbins – piano
- Connie Smith – lead vocals
- Roby Story – violin
- Gary Vanosdale – viola
- Bill Walker – vibes
- Lamar Watkins – guitar
- Harvey Wolfe – cello
- William Wright – background vocals

Technical personnel

- Jesse Burt – Liner Notes
- Bob Ferguson – Producer
- Jim Malloy – Engineer
- Bill Vandevort – Engineer

== Chart performance ==
Chart (1968–1969)	Peak position
US Top Country Albums (Billboard)	32

== Release history ==
Region	Date	Format	Label	Ref.
North America	October 1968	Vinyl	RCA Victor Records	
North America	2010s	Music download; streaming	Sony Music Entertainment	
