= Seattle (song) =

Song from the American television series Here Come the Brides

Single by Perry Como

from the album Seattle
- B-side: "Sunshine Wine"
- Released: 1969
- Recorded: October 10, 1968
- Genre: Traditional pop
- Length: 2:47
- Label: RCA Victor
- Songwriters: Hugo Montenegro, Jack Keller, Ernie Sheldon
- Producers: Andy Wiswell, Chet Atkins

"Seattle" is a song composed by Hugo Montenegro with lyrics by Jack Keller and Ernie Sheldon. It was used as the theme for the 1968–1970 ABC-TV United States television show Here Come the Brides, which was set in 19th-century Seattle, Washington.

== Performances ==
=== Perry Como and Bobby Sherman versions ===
Late in the show's first season, singer Perry Como recorded a version of the song for his album of the same name, which became a Top 40 hit for him on the Billboard Hot 100 singles charts and number 37 in Canada in early 1969. His version nearly topped the Billboard Easy Listening charts as well, peaking at No. 2. One of the stars of Here Come the Brides, pop singer Bobby Sherman, also recorded a version of the song, but his version was never released as a single. Instead it was included on his self-titled debut album. Connie Smith also recorded the song that same year on her Connie's Country LP as the starting track.

=== Series theme versions ===
Two different versions were used as the theme for the television series, for both of which Montenegro conducted an in-studio orchestra: the first was instrumental; and the second was vocal, with its lyrics being sung by a musical team called "The New Establishment."

=== Game Theory version ===
The power pop group Game Theory recorded the song in 1986. The recording was not released until 1993, when it appeared as a bonus track on the CD release of the 1986 album The Big Shot Chronicles. The song also appears on the album's 2016 reissue.

=== Other versions ===
"Seattle" is sung by the Seattle Sounders FC's supporter groups, during matches, specifically at the kickoff of each half.
