= Come Along and Walk with Me =

Studio album by Connie Smith
- Released: October 1971
- Recorded: June 1 – 3, 1971
- Studio: RCA Victor Studios
- Genre: Gospel
- Label: RCA Victor
- Producer: Bob Ferguson

Connie Smith chronology
Just One Time (1971)	Come Along and Walk with Me (1971)	Ain't We Havin' Us a Good Time (1972)

Come Along and Walk with Me is seventeenth solo studio album by American country singer Connie Smith, released in October 1971 by RCA Victor. The album was Smith’s third collection of gospel songs. The disc included original songs and covers of songs first cut by other artists. Among the song included on the project were three by gospel performer Dottie Rambo. Following its release, Billboard gave the album a positive review.

== Background ==
Prior to the making of Come Along and Walk with Me, Connie Smith had nearly a decade of top ten and top 20 country singles. In 1968, she became a Christian which ultimately influenced her to record more gospel material. Many of her regular country albums had featured one or two gospel selections. Yet, Smith wanted to record a full-length gospel collection. In a 2012 interview with Barry Mazor, Smith explained that recording a gospel album was not in the interest of her record label. However, Smith also realized that she was "making them money at the time" and "there were some things they needed to appease".

== Recording content ==
Smith went into the recording studio to cut material for Come Along and Walk with Me over the course of three days in 1971: June 1, June 2 and June 3. The sessions were produced by her longtime producer at the RCA Victor label, Bob Ferguson. The pair recorded at RCA Victor Studios, located in Nashville, Tennessee. Three overdub sessions were also added that included background vocals from the Nashville Edition. The gospel collection contained a total of ten tracks. Biographer Barry Mazor considered the project to be a departure from that of her previous gospel albums. Mazor found the material and the sound to be performed in the "outright gospel song mode" that featured "complex narratives". In an interview with Mazor, Smith further added that the material chosen for the project were based on her growth as a Christian during that time.

The album's title track came from one of two songs penned by Dallas Frazier and Doodle Owens. The songwriting pair also penned "The Bridge of Love" for the project. Smith also recorded three songs written by gospel singer and songwriter Dottie Rambo. Rambo often stopped over to Smith's house to pitch material for her to record. "Just to have her sit on my couch and play guitar and sing some with her great voice was awesome. She was one of the greatest songwriters that ever lived," recounted Smith. Smith also covered "He Touched Me" which was recorded and written by gospel artist Bill Gaither.

== Release and reception ==
Come Along and Walk with Me was originally released in October 1971 on the RCA Victor label. It was the nineteenth studio release of Smith's career, her third studio album of 1971 and her third album of gospel material. RCA Victor originally distributed the disc as a vinyl LP, containing five songs on either side of the record. Decades later, the album was reissued by the Sony Music Entertainment label and was made available to digital platforms including Apple Music. After its original release, Billboard gave the LP a favorable response in their "Album Reviews" section of their November 20 issue. "Ms. Smith is in fine voice and producer Bob Ferguson has done a fine LP," reviewers concluded. According to Smith, the album was not a commercial success because RCA Victor did not promote the album. She further added RCA failed to promote the LP because it was not "a money maker for them". "It was available for people though, and that was what mattered to me," she noted.

== Track listings ==
=== Vinyl version ===
Side one
No.	Title	Writer(s)	Length
1.	"Plenty of Time"	Clay McLean	3:05
2.	"The Street Where the Lonely Walk"	Gladness Jennings	3:08
3.	"The Bridge of Love"	Dallas Frazier; Doodle Owens	2:40
4.	"Crumbs from the Table"	Barbara Miller	3:06
5.	"He Touched Me"	Bill Gaither	2:54

Side two
No.	Title	Writer(s)	Length
1.	"Come Along and Walk with Me"	Frazier; Owens	2:57
2.	"(In the Valley) He Restoreth My Soul"	Dottie Rambo	2:30
3.	"Too Much to Gain to Lose"	Rambo	2:47
4.	"Don't Let Me Walk Too Far from Calvary"	Rambo	3:46
5.	"I'd Still Want to Serve Him Today"	Ray Lewis	2:18

=== Digital version ===
Come Along and Walk with Me (download and streaming)
No.	Title	Writer(s)	Length
1.	"Plenty of Time"	McLean	3:07
2.	"The Street Where the Lonely Walk"	Jennings	3:11
3.	"The Bridge of Love"	Frazier; Owens	2:40
4.	"Crumbs from the Table"	Miller	3:10
5.	"He Touched Me"	Gaither	2:56
6.	"Come Along and Walk with Me"	Frazier; Owens	3:00
7.	"(In the Valley) He Restoreth My Soul"	Rambo	2:32
8.	"Too Much to Gain to Lose"	Rambo	2:49
9.	"Don't Let Me Walk Too Far from Calvary"	Rambo	3:51
10.	"I'd Still Want to Serve Him Today"	Lewis	2:21

== Personnel ==
All credits are adapted from the liner notes of Come Along and Walk with Me and the biography booklet by Barry Mazor titled Just for What I Am.

Musical personnel

- Jerry Carrigan – drums
- John Hughey – steel guitar, leader
- Junior Huskey – bass
- Charlie McCoy – Harmonica, vibes
- David Kirby – electric guitar
- The Nashville Edition – backing vocals
- Dean Porter – rhythm guitar
- Hargus "Pig" Robbins – piano
- Hal Rugg – steel guitar
- Carol Rodgers Snow – organ
- Connie Smith – lead vocals
- Chip Young – rhythm guitar

Technical personnel

- Dick Cobb – cover photo
- Bob Ferguson – producer
- Al Pachucki – recording engineer
- Roy Shockley – recording technician
- Connie Smith – liner Notes

== Release history ==
Region	Date	Format	Label	Ref.
North America	October 1971	Vinyl	RCA Victor	
North America	2010s	Music download; streaming	Sony Music Entertainment	
