= Just One Time (album) =

Studio album by Connie Smith
- Released: June 1971
- Recorded: February 15 – 25, 1971
- Studio: RCA Victor Studios
- Genre: Country
- Label: RCA Victor
- Producer: Bob Ferguson

Connie Smith chronology
Where Is My Castle (1971)	Just One Time (1971)	Come Along and Walk with Me (1971)

Singles from Just One Time
- 1. "Just One Time" Released: April 1971

Just One Time is the sixteenth solo studio album by American country singer Connie Smith, released in June 1971 by RCA Victor. The album was named for the lead single of the same name, which reached the top five of the North American country charts in 1971. The album itself would chart in the top 20 of the American country LP's chart following its release. Additionally, Billboard magazine gave the project a positive reception when reviewing it in 1971.

== Background ==
After discovering Christianity in 1968, Smith's commercial success lost some of its momentum. Although she had a string of top ten singles between 1964 and 1968, Smith's future releases following 1968 made the top ten with less frequency. Yet, she remained popular with 1970's top five song, "I Never Once Stopped Loving You", and 1971's top five song, "Just One Time". The latter single inspired the title of Smith's next album. Smith's friend and fellow country artist, Loretta Lynn, wrote the album's liner notes: "time after time [Connie] puts her heart and soul in everything she sings."

== Recording and content ==
The recording sessions for the making of Just One Time were Smith's first for the year of 1971. She and record producer Bob Ferguson made the album on February 15, February 16 and February 25 of that year. Overdub sessions featuring a vocal chorus were added following the laying down of Smith's original vocals. The sessions were held at RCA Victor Studios, located in Nashville, Tennessee. A total of ten tracks comprised the album. The disc opens with the title track, which was written and originally recorded by country artist Don Gibson. Gibson's version had originally been a number one country single in 1960. Smith did not want to record the song since it had already been done, but Bob Ferguson encouraged her. "So that was one of those many times that I recorded a song on Bob's apt advice," Smith recounted. The album also included a cover of "I Love You More and More Every Day", which was a top ten pop single for Al Martino in 1964.

Smith also cut three gospel selections for the album project. Among these songs was a cover of "Amazing Grace", featuring background vocals by the Nashville Edition. It also included a cover of "Wait for the Light to Shine", which had previously been done by artists like Roy Acuff, The Louvin Brothers and Hank Williams. The third gospel song was a new version of songwriter Dallas Frazier's "There Goes My Everything". Re-written as a gospel tune, it was re-titled as "He Is My Everything". Several new country selections were also included on the album such as Smith's self-penned "Don't Walk Away". In a 2012 interview, Smith recalled not taking time to write songs, but happened to write "Don't Walk Away" while her mother was visiting her. "I asked her if she would watch what was on the stove for a minute and I got my guitar and finished it," Smith remembered.

== Release and reception ==
Just One Time was originally released in June 1971 on the RCA Victor label. It was the eighteenth studio album released in Smith's career and her second of 1971. The label originally distributed the disc as a vinyl LP, with five songs on each side of the record. Decades later, Sony Music Entertainment re-released the album to digital platforms including Apple Music. Billboard gave the project a positive response following its original release, describing Smith as having a "big yet plaintive voice". Reviewers highlighted the title track, "I Don't Want to Be with Me", "If You Were Mine to Lose" and "He Is My Everything" in the review, calling them "outstanding songs". Although it was not formally reviewed by AllMusic, the online site did name the title track a "track pick".

Following its original release, Just One Time debuted on the American Billboard Country LP's chart on July 3, 1971. The album spent nine weeks on the chart and peaked at the number 20 position. It was her seventh album to peak in the Billboard top 20. The album's title track was released as the only single from the disc in April 1971 by RCA Victor. The single spent 17 weeks on the Billboard Hot Country Songs chart, peaking at number two by July 1971. It was Smith's highest-charting single on the chart since 1966 and her second top five single since 1970's "I Never Once Stopped Loving You". The song also reached the number two position on Canada's RPM Country Songs chart.

== Track listings ==
=== Vinyl version ===
Side one
No.	Title	Writer(s)	Length
1.	"Just One Time"	Don Gibson	2:29
2.	"I Don't Want to Be with Me"	Mickey Jaco	2:31
3.	"Amazing Grace"	John Newton	2:47
4.	"Love Has a Mind of Its Own"	Dallas Frazier	2:35
5.	"If You Were Mine to Lose"	Jaco	2:29

Side two
No.	Title	Writer(s)	Length
1.	"Don't Walk Away"	Connie Smith	2:32
2.	"He Is My Everything"	Dallas Frazier	2:56
3.	"One More Time"	Larry Butler; Jan Crutchfield; Buddy Killen	2:19
4.	"I Love You More and More Every Day"	Don Robertson	2:10
5.	"Wait for the Light to Shine"	Fred Rose	2:53

=== Digital version ===
Just One Time (download and streaming)
No.	Title	Writer(s)	Length
1.	"Just One Time"	Gibson	2:30
2.	"I Don't Want to Be with Me"	Jaco	2:33
3.	"Amazing Grace"	Newton	2:48
4.	"Love Has a Mind of Its Own"	Frazier	2:37
5.	"If You Were Mine to Lose"	Jaco	2:31
6.	"Don't Walk Away"	Smith	2:33
7.	"He Is My Everything"	Frazier	2:54
8.	"One More Time"	Butler; Crutchfield; Killen	2:21
9.	"I Love You More and More Every Day"	Robertson	2:16
10.	"Wait for the Light to Shine"	Rose	2:56

== Personnel ==
All credits are adapted from the liner notes of Just One Time and the biography booklet by Barry Mazor titled Just for What I Am.

Musical personnel

- Stu Basore – electric bass
- Larry Butler – piano
- Jerry Carrigan – drums
- Ray Edenton – rhythm guitar
- Johnny Gimble – fiddle
- John Hughey – steel guitar
- Roy Huskey Jr. – bass
- Jimmy Isbell – drums
- Dave Kirby – rhythm guitar
- Charlie McCoy – harmonica
- Bob Moore – bass
- Weldon Myrick – steel guitar
- The Nashville Edition – backing vocals
- Dean Porter – guitar
- Hargus "Pig" Robbins – piano
- Billy Sanford – guitar
- Jerry Shook – rhythm guitar
- Connie Smith – lead vocals
- Carol Snow – organ
- Pete Wade – guitar
- Billy Walker – vibes
- Jerry Whitehurst – piano

Technical personnel

- Jerry Bradley – overdub session producer (March 16, 1971)
- Bob Ferguson – producer
- Loretta Lynn – liner notes
- Al Pachucki – recording engineer
- Tom Pick – recording engineer
- Roy Shockley – recording technician
- Connie Smith – arrangements

== Chart performance ==
Chart (1971)	Peak position
US Top Country Albums (Billboard)	20

== Release history ==
Region	Date	Format	Label	Ref.
North America	June 1971	Vinyl	RCA Victor	
Japan	June 1971	Vinyl	RCA Records	
North America	2010s	Music download; streaming	Sony Music Entertainment	
