= Connie's Country =

Studio album by Connie Smith
- Released: April 1969
- Recorded: February 1967 – December 1968
- Studios: RCA Studio A (Nashville, Tennessee)
- Genres: Country; pop
- Label: RCA Victor
- Producer: Bob Ferguson

Connie Smith chronology
Sunshine and Rain (1968)	Connie's Country (1969)	Young Love (1969)

Singles from Connie's Country
- 1. "Ribbon of Darkness" Released: February 1969

Connie's Country is the twelfth studio album by American country singer Connie Smith, released in April 1969 by RCA Victor. The pop-inspired project included a mixture of original and cover songs. The album 'Connie's Country' was a hit, with a cover of Gordon Lightfoot's 'Ribbon of Darkness' reaching the top 20 on the American country songs chart. The album itself was also successful, placing in the top 20 on the American country albums chart. Critics praised the album for its quality and song selection.

== Background ==
Connie Smith had a string of uninterrupted top ten country singles during the 1960s, launched by 1964's "Once a Day". The song topped the country songs chart for eight weeks and launched her career. In 1968, Smith became a Christian, which had a profound impact on her musical output during her time with RCA Victor. She began incorporating more gospel songs into her regular studio albums, which would reflect in Smith's 1969 album. Smith went into recording sessions to make her next album, Connie's Country in 1968. Biographer Barry Mazor notes that "despite the title" the sort of pop music that "Ms. Smith found most agreeable".

== Recording and content ==
The recordings for Connie's Country were taken from sessions held between February 1967 and December 1968. The sessions took place at RCA Studio A, located in Nashville, Tennessee. The sessions were produced by Bob Ferguson. The album consisted of 12 tracks. With the album's pop influence, there was an emphasis on string instrumentation. Smith sought out direction from Brenton Banks, who led the string instrumentation for her sessions. The album mixed new recordings with covers of previously recorded country and pop material.

One of the covers Smith cut for the album was "Ribbon of Darkness". Although written and first cut by Gordon Lightfoot, Smith recalled first hearing Marty Robbins's 1965 country single version. Smith also covered "Seattle", which was first recorded by Perry Como and appeared as the theme song to the television show Here Come the Brides. She also covered Merle Haggard's country selection "Today I Started Loving You Again". Several new tracks were also part of the album. Of these new songs was "Sound of Different Drums", which was composed by Harlan Howard. Also included was "A Lonely Woman", which was composed by Jean Chapel and Alda Calongne. Smith also cut the Ben Peters-penned "Happy Street", which Mazor described as a "giddy" song as compared to the rest of the album. As part of Smith's vow to record one gospel track per studio album, she cut one of her favorite hymns called "Gathering Flowers for the Master's Bouquet".

== Release and reception ==
Professional ratings
Review scores
Source	Rating
Allmusic	4.5/5 stars

Connie's Country was originally released in April 1969 on the RCA Victor label. It was the twelfth studio collection released in Smith's career. The album was distributed as a vinyl LP, containing six songs on either side of the record. Decades later, the album was re-released on Sony Music Entertainment to digital and streaming sites. The album received a positive review from Billboard magazine, which praised Smith's reading of "Ribbon of Darkness". The magazine also highlighted "The Sound of Different Drums", "Blue Little Girl" and "Got a Lotta Blues to Lose". AllMusic gave it 4.5 out of 5 stars. In its original release, Connie's Country spent 15 weeks on the American Billboard Top Country Albums chart, peaking at number 14 in June 1969. Smith's version of "Ribbon of Darkness" was issued as a single in February 1969 by RCA Victor. The single spent 14 weeks on the Billboard Hot Country Songs chart and peaked at number 13 in October 1969. It was Smith's second top 20 single in her career.

== Track listings ==
=== Vinyl version ===
Side one
No.	Title	Writer(s)	Length
1.	"Seattle"	Jack Keller; Hugo Montenegro; Ernie Sheldon	2:55
2.	"Ribbon of Darkness"	Gordon Lightfoot	2:38
3.	"Gotta Lotta Blues to Lose"	Jimmy Gateley	2:10
4.	"Today I Started Loving You Again"	Merle Haggard; Bonnie Owens	2:13
5.	"You"	Jimmy Holder	3:06
6.	"I'll Love You Enough (For Both of Us)"	Ray Griff	2:03

Side two
No.	Title	Writer(s)	Length
1.	"Sound of Different Drums"	Harlan Howard	2:28
2.	"Happy Street"	Ben Peters	2:32
3.	"Blue Little Girl"	Betty Jean Robinson	3:04
4.	"A Lonely Woman"	Alda Calogne; Jean Chapel	2:57
5.	"You Don't Have Very Far to Go"	Haggard; Red Simpson	2:33
6.	"Gathering Flowers for the Master's Bouquet"	Marvin E. Baumgardner	2:50

=== Digital version ===
Connie's Country (download and streaming)
No.	Title	Writer(s)	Length
1.	"Seattle"	Keller; Montenegro; Sheldon	2:57
2.	"Ribbon of Darkness"	Lightfoot	2:41
3.	"Gotta Lotta Blues to Lose"	Gateley	2:15
4.	"Today I Started Loving You Again"	Haggard; Owens	2:18
5.	"You"	Holder	3:11
6.	"I'll Love You Enough (For Both of Us)"	Griff	2:08
7.	"Sound of Different Drums"	Howard	2:30
8.	"Happy Street"	Peters	2:34
9.	"Blue Little Girl"	Robinson	3:07
10.	"A Lonely Woman"	Calogne; Chapel	2:59
11.	"You Don't Have Very Far to Go"	Haggard; Simpson	2:35
12.	"Gathering Flowers for the Master's Bouquet"	Baumgardner	2:50

== Personnel ==
All credits are adapted from the liner notes of Connie's Country and the biography booklet by Barry Mazor titled Just for What I Am.

Musical personnel

- Byron Bach – cello
- Brenton Banks – violin
- Howard Carpenter – viola
- Jerry Carrigan – drums
- Dorothy Dillard – background vocals
- Ray Edenton – guitar
- Johnny Gimble – fiddle
- Solie Fott – violin
- Buddy Harman – drums
- Priscilla Hubbard – background vocals
- Lillian Hunt – violin
- Roy Huskey – bass
- Charles Justice – fiddle
- Martin Katahn – violin
- John Kline – viola
- Shelly Kurland – violin
- Charlie McCoy – electric bass, harmonica
- Piere Menard – violin
- Weldon Myrick – steel guitar
- Louis Nunley – background vocals
- Dean Porter – guitar
- Hargus "Pig" Robbins – piano
- Connie Smith – lead vocals
- Roby Story – violin
- Leo Taylor – drums
- Gary Vanosdale – viola
- Bill Walker – vibes
- Lamar Watkins – guitar
- Harvey Wolfe – cello
- William Wright – background vocals

Technical personnel

- Brenton Banks – Arranger
- Jesse Burt – Liner Notes
- Bob Ferguson – Producer
- Milton Henderson – Technician
- Al Pachucki – Engineer
- Roy Shockley – Technician
- Bill Walker – Arranger, conductor

== Chart performance ==
Chart (1969)	Peak position
US Top Country Albums (Billboard)	14

== Release history ==
Region	Date	Format	Label	Ref.
North America	April 1969	Vinyl	RCA Victor Records	
North America	2010s	Music download; streaming	Sony Music Entertainment	
