= Where Is My Castle =

Studio album by Connie Smith
- Released: January 1971
- Recorded: September 23 – October 29, 1970
- Studio: RCA Victor Studios
- Genre: Country; traditional country
- Label: RCA Victor
- Producer: Bob Ferguson

Connie Smith chronology
I Never Once Stopped Loving You (1970)	Where Is My Castle (1971)	Just One Time (1971)

Singles from Where Is My Castle
- 1. "Where Is My Castle" Released: December 1970

Where Is My Castle is the fifteenth solo studio album by American country singer Connie Smith, released in January 1971 by RCA Victor. The album was described as a set of a traditional country songs and were considered to be autobiographical of Smith's life at the time. The disc's title track was released as a single in 1970 and reached the top 20 of the North American country charts. The album itself would chart in the top 40 of the American country LP's chart. Following its release, Billboard magazine gave it a positive review.

== Background ==
Connie Smith reached the peak of her commercial success in the mid 1960s with a series of top ten country singles fueled by the eight-week number one song, "Once a Day". In 1968, Smith discovered Christianity and re-evaluated her lifestyle choices. Following this transition, her singles made the top ten with less frequency, but she continued to record several times per year for her record label and remained a popular concert attraction. One single of this period to miss the top ten was a 1970 top 20 recording titled "Where Is My Castle". This would serve as the title to her next studio album. According to biographer Barry Mazor, Smith was emotionally-"sidelined" during the making of Where Is My Castle. Smith herself described the material she chose for the project as autobiographical of her emotions at the time: "Anybody knows, that it's cathartic to be able to sing how you feel about things."

== Recording and content ==
Smith entered the studio to record the selections for Where Is My Castle in the fall of 1970. She cut the album's material over the course of five studio sessions: September 23, September 28, October 6 and October 27. The sessions were recorded at RCA Victor Studios, located in Nashville, Tennessee and were produced by Bob Ferguson. Five overdub sessions were also recorded that featured a vocal chorus performed by four background singers. The album consisted of ten tracks. Billboard magazine described the album as having a "traditional country flavor". Songs recorded for the album featured background instrumentation from fiddle and steel guitar.

Four cuts by songwriter Dallas Frazier were recorded for the project. According to Frazier, many of the album's songs he penned for Smith were reflective of her personal life: "When you're close to people, they always influence your writing," he recounted in 2012. Among the songs by Frazier was the title track, which has been claimed to have been written about Smith's two failed marriages up to that point. Other new recordings included Frazier's "Darling Days", "Too Good to Be True" and the Conway Twitty-penned "I'm So Used to Loving You".

Smith also recorded several covers for the project including Twitty's "Hello Darlin'". According to Mazor, Twitty performed the song to Smith first before releasing his own version as a single. She also covered Roger Miller's "When a House Is Not a Home" and Merle Haggard's gospel selection titled "Jesus Take a Hold". Smith would end up re-recording the track for her 2021 album The Cry of the Heart and explain her reasoning for doing so to The New York Times: "It’s just as relevant today as it was back then, if not more so." A second gospel song was also included titled "Clinging to a Saving Hand". Another cover song Smith cut for the project was "Before I'm Over You", which was originally a top five country single for Loretta Lynn.

== Release and reception ==
Where Is My Castle was released in January 1971 on the RCA Victor label. It became the seventeenth studio project released in Smith's career. The label originally released it as a vinyl LP, with five songs on each side of the record. Decades later, the album was re-released for downloading and streaming through the Sony Music Entertainment label. Following its original release, the album received a positive response by Billboard magazine. Reviewers described "Before I'm Over You", "Clinging to a Saving Hand" and "Hello Darlin" as "outstanding tunes". Where Is My Castle spent five weeks on the American Billboard Top Country Albums chart, peaking at the number 39 position in February 1971. It was Smith's lowest-charting Billboard album up to that point in her career. The title track was the only single included on the disc and was first released by RCA Victor in December 1970. It spent 14 weeks on the Billboard Hot Country Songs chart, peaking at number 11 in March 1971. It was Smith's sixth single to reach the top 20. The single also became her third to enter Canada's RPM Country chart, peaking at number 20.

== Track listings ==
=== Vinyl version ===
Side one
No.	Title	Writer(s)	Length
1.	"I'm So Used to Loving You"	Conway Twitty	2:48
2.	"Too Good to Be True"	Dallas Frazier	2:11
3.	"Before I'm Over You"	Betty Sue Perry	2:40
4.	"When a House Is Not a Home"	Roger Miller	2:17
5.	"Clinging to A Saving Hand"	Bill Mack	2:40

Side two
No.	Title	Writer(s)	Length
1.	"Where Is My Castle"	Frazier	2:38
2.	"Darling Days"	Frazier; Sanger D. Shafer	2:58
3.	"Jesus Take a Hold"	Merle Haggard	2:26
4.	"I Can't Believe That You've Stopped Loving Me"	Frazier; Arthur Leo Owens	2:54
5.	"Hello Darlin'"	Twitty	2:26

=== Digital version ===
Where Is My Castle (download and streaming)
No.	Title	Writer(s)	Length
1.	"I'm So Used to Loving You"	Twitty	2:51
2.	"Too Good to Be True"	Frazier	2:13
3.	"Before I'm Over You"	Perry	2:43
4.	"When a House Is Not a Home"	Miller	2:20
5.	"Clinging to A Saving Hand"	Mack	2:42
6.	"Where Is My Castle"	Frazier	2:41
7.	"Darling Days"	Frazier; Shafer	2:59
8.	"Jesus Take a Hold"	Haggard	2:30
9.	"I Can't Believe That You've Stopped Loving Me"	Frazier; Owens	2:57
10.	"Hello Darlin'"	Twitty	2:29

== Personnel ==
All credits are adapted from the liner notes of Where Is My Castle and the biography booklet by Barry Mazor titled Just for What I Am.

Musical personnel

- Joseph Babcock – backing vocals
- David Briggs – piano
- Kenneth Buttrey – drums
- Jerry Carrigan – drums
- Bobby Dyson – bass
- Ray Edenton – rhythm guitar
- Dolores Edgin – backing vocals
- Johnny Gimble – fiddle, violin
- John Hughey – leader, steel guitar
- Junior Huskey – bass
- Charlie McCoy – electric guitar, harmonica, organ
- Leonard Miller – drums, leader
- Weldon Myrick – steel guitar
- June Page – backing vocals
- Dean Porter – guitar, leader
- Hargus "Pig" Robbins – piano
- Connie Smith – lead vocals
- Pete Wade – electric guitar
- Hurshel Wiginton – backing vocals
- Tommy Williams – fiddle
- Chip Young – rhythm guitar

Technical personnel

- Dick Cobb – cover photo
- Bob Ferguson – producer
- Al Pachucki – recording engineer
- Bill Vandevort – recording engineer

== Chart performance ==
Chart (1971)	Peak position
US Top Country Albums (Billboard)	39

== Release history ==
Region	Date	Format	Label	Ref.
North America	January 1971	Vinyl	RCA Victor	
North America	January 1971	Vinyl	RCA International	
United Kingdom	January 1971	Vinyl	RCA Victor	
North America	2010s	Music download; streaming	Sony Music Entertainment	
