= If It Ain't Love (Let's Leave It Alone) =

Single by Connie Smith

from the album If It Ain't Love and Other Great Dallas Frazier Songs
- B-side: "Living Without You (Is Too Much to Live with)"
- Released: July 1972
- Genre: Country
- Label: RCA Records
- Songwriter(s): Dallas Frazier
- Producer(s): Bob Ferguson

Connie Smith singles chronology
"Just for What I Am" (1972)	"If It Ain't Love (Let's Leave It Alone)" (1972)	"Love Is the Look You're Looking for (song)" (1972)

"If It Ain't Love (Let's Leave It Alone)"

Single by The Whites

from the album Whole New World
- B-side: "I Don't Care (Just as Long as You Love Me)"
- Released: 1985
- Genre: Country
- Label: MCA/Curb
- Songwriter(s): Dallas Frazier
- Producer(s): Ricky Skaggs; Marshall Morgan

The Whites singles chronology
"Pins and Needles" (1984)	"If It Ain't Love (Let's Leave It Alone)" (1985)	"Hometown Gossip" (1985)

"If It Ain't Love (Let's Leave It Alone)" is a single originally recorded by American country music artist Connie Smith. Released in July 1972, the song reached #7 on the Billboard Hot Country Singles chart. The song was issued onto Smith's second studio album of 1972 entitled If It Ain't Love and Other Great Dallas Frazier Songs. In addition, "If It Ain't Love (Let's Leave It Alone)" peaked at #14 on the Canadian RPM Country Tracks chart around the same time.

In 1985, American country group The Whites recorded and released a cover version of "If It Ain't Love (Let's Leave It Alone)". The group's version peaked at #12 on the Billboard Hot Country Songs & Tracks chart. The song was later released on their 1985 album entitled Whole New World. In addition, the single peaked at #22 on the Canadian RPM Country Tracks chart around the same time.

== Chart performance ==
=== Connie Smith ===
Chart (1972)	Peak position
U.S. Billboard Hot Country Singles	7
CAN RPM Country Tracks	14

=== The Whites ===
Chart (1985)	Peak position
U.S. Billboard Hot Country Songs & Tracks	12
CAN RPM Country Tracks	22
