= Ain't We Havin' Us a Good Time =

Studio album by Connie Smith
- Released: April 1972
- Recorded: February 1971 – January 1972
- Studio: RCA Victor Studios
- Genre: Country
- Label: RCA Victor
- Producer: Bob Ferguson

Connie Smith chronology
Come Along and Walk with Me (1971)	Ain't We Havin' Us a Good Time (1972)	If It Ain't Love and Other Great Dallas Frazier Songs (1972)

Singles from Ain't We Havin' Us a Good Time
- 1. "Just for What I Am" Released: February 1972

Ain't We Havin' Us a Good Time is the eighteenth solo studio album by American country singer Connie Smith, released in April 1972 by RCA Victor. The album contained ten tracks which were considered to have a "thicker seventies" sound, according to one biographer. Included on the album was Smith's single, "Just for What I Am". It became a top five single on the North American country songs chart while the album itself reached the American country LP's top 25. Ain't We Havin' Us a Good Time received a favorable review from Billboard magazine following its release.

== Background ==
By 1972, Connie Smith had nearly eight years of commercial country music success. She reached her career zenith in the mid 1960s with a series of top ten hits fueled by her eight-week number one debut single titled "Once a Day". After discovering Christianity in 1968, Smith's commercial momentum slightly dipped after she re-evaluated her personal and professional choices. Yet, she continued having top ten country singles with regularity such as 1970's "I Never Once Stopped Loving You" and 1971's "Just One Time". In 1972, Smith would have three top ten country singles, including "Just for What I Am". The song would appear on Smith's next studio album, which would be titled Ain't We Havin' Us a Good Time. The album's title track would inspire the name of the project.

== Recording and content ==
Smith entered the RCA Victor Studios in Nashville, Tennessee to record the project in late 1971 and early 1972. The album's material was taken from sessions held on December 10, 1971 and January 14, 1972. The track "As Long as We've Got Each Other" was pulled from a recording session on February 25, 1971. Overdub sessions were also included for the project that featured background vocals from the Nashville Edition and The Jordanaires. Smith preferred to have the background singers be overdubbed because she often found "herself phrasing with them rather than singing spontaneously", according to biographer Barry Mazor. The session instrumentation was a departure from Smith's previous material. Mazor described it as having a "thicker seventies sound" that included four rhythm guitarists. "With that rhythm behind me, it made singing so much easier – and a lot more fun," recalled Smith The recording sessions were overseen by Smith's longtime producer at RCA Victor, Bob Ferguson.

Ain't We Havin' Us a Good Time consisted of ten tracks. The title track and "Just for What I Am" were composed by Dallas Frazier. Doodle Owens co-composed these selections. Frazier had become friends with Smith by this point and had written a series of songs she had recorded. Frazier had written both cuts as a reflection on Smith's personal life at the time. "By this time, we were good friends, and she was calling and saying 'You know, I'm cutting, and I need a couple of things' and I'd try to accommodate her directly, as best I could," he recounted. Frazier and Owens also contributed "I Know You're Going Away", "Thank You for Loving Me" and "As Long as We've Got Each Other" for the project. Smith's religious convictions prompted her to included one or two gospel selections on her studio albums. For Ain't We Havin' Us a Good Time, she included the gospel songs "Way Up on the Mountain" and "If God Is Dead (Who's That Living in My Soul)".

== Release and reception ==
Ain't We Havin' Us a Good Time was originally released in April 1972 on the RCA Victor label. It was Smith's twentieth studio album released in her career. The label originally distributed the disc as a vinyl LP, with five songs on each side of the record. Decades later, Sony Music Entertainment re-issued the album to digital platforms including Apple Music. Following its initial release, the disc received a favorable response from Billboard magazine. Reviewers found Smith to have a "seemingly effortless delivery" when singing and highlighted several album cuts including the title track. The album entered the American Billboard Country LP's chart in May 1972 and spent 11 weeks on the chart before reaching number 25 in July 1972. Included on the album was the single "Just for What I Am", which RCA Victor released in February 1972. The single spent 15 weeks on the Billboard Hot Country Songs and peaked at number five in April 1972. The single also became her second-highest charting song on Canada's RPM Country survey, peaking at number four.

== Track listings ==
=== Vinyl version ===
Side one
No.	Title	Writer(s)	Length
1.	"If We Want Love to Last"	L. E. White	2:43
2.	"How Sweet It Is"	Bobby Braddock	2:26
3.	"Just for What I Am"	Dallas Frazier; A.L. "Doodle" Owens	2:25
4.	"As Long as We've Got Each Other"	Frazier; Owens	2:27
5.	"Way Up on the Mountain"	Ira Louvin; Anne Young	2:30

Side two
No.	Title	Writer(s)	Length
1.	"Thank You for Loving Me"	Frazier; Owens	3:10
2.	"I Know You're Going Away"	Frazier	2:52
3.	"Ain't We Havin' Us a Good Time"	Frazier; Owens	2:10
4.	"Precious Love"	Byron R. Walls	2:13
5.	"If God Is Dead (Who's That Living in My Soul)"	Lawrence Reynolds	2:48

=== Digital version ===
Ain't We Havin' Us a Good Time (download and streaming)
No.	Title	Writer(s)	Length
1.	"If We Want Love to Last"	White	2:45
2.	"How Sweet It Is"	Braddock	2:29
3.	"Just for What I Am"	Frazier; Owens	2:26
4.	"As Long as We've Got Each Other"	Frazier; Owens	2:30
5.	"Way Up on the Mountain"	Louvin; Young	2:33
6.	"Thank You for Loving Me"	Frazier; Owens	3:13
7.	"I Know You're Going Away"	Frazier	2:55
8.	"Ain't We Havin' Us a Good Time"	Frazier; Owens	2:14
9.	"Precious Love"	Walls	2:16
10.	"If God Is Dead (Who's That Living in My Soul)"	Reynolds	2:51

== Personnel ==
All credits are adapted from the liner notes of Ain't We Havin' Us a Good Time and the biography booklet by Barry Mazor titled Just for What I Am.

Musical personnel

- Jerry Carrigan – drums
- Larry Butler – piano
- Johnny Gimble – fiddle
- John Hughey – steel guitar
- Roy Huskey Jr. – electric bass
- Jim Isbell – drums
- The Jordanaires – backing vocals
- David Kirby – electric guitar
- Billy Linneman – bass
- Snuff Miller – drums
- Bob Moore – bass, leader
- Weldon Myrick – steel guitar
- The Nashville Edition – backing vocals
- Dean Porter – electric guitar, leader
- Hargus "Pig" Robbins – piano
- Carol Rodgers-Snow – organ
- Billy Sanford – rhythm guitar
- Connie Smith – lead vocals
- Pete Wade – electric guitar
- Chip Young – rhythm guitar

Technical personnel

- Ray Butler – recording engineer
- Dick Cobb – cover photo
- Bob Ferguson – producer
- Bill Goodman – liner photo
- Al Pachucki – recording engineer
- Roy Shockley – recording technician
- Bill Vandevort – recording engineer

== Chart performance ==
Chart (1972)	Peak position
US Top Country Albums (Billboard)	25

== Release history ==
Region	Date	Format	Label	Ref.
North America	April 1972	Vinyl	RCA Victor	
North America	2010s	Music download; streaming	Sony Music Entertainment	
