= Where Is My Castle (song) =

Single by Connie Smith

from the album Where Is My Castle
- B-side: "Clinging to a Saving Hand"
- Released: December 1970
- Genre: Country
- Label: RCA Records
- Songwriter(s): Dallas Frazier
- Producer(s): Bob Ferguson

Connie Smith singles chronology
"Louisiana Man" (1970)	"Where Is My Castle" (1970)	"Just One Time" (1971)

"Where Is My Castle" is a single by American country music artist Connie Smith. Released in December 1970, the song reached #11 on the Billboard Hot Country Singles chart. An album of the same name was later issued in early 1971 to go along with the single. Additionally, "Where Is My Castle" peaked at #20 on the Canadian RPM Country Tracks chart.

== Chart performance ==
Chart (1970–71)	Peak position
U.S. Billboard Hot Country Singles	11
CAN RPM Country Tracks	20
