= God Is Abundant =

Studio album by Connie Smith
- Released: November 1973
- Recorded: May 15 – June 28, 1973
- Studio: Columbia Studio B
- Genre: Religious; gospel
- Label: Columbia
- Producer: George Richey

Connie Smith chronology
Connie Smith's Greatest Hits, Vol. I (1973)	God Is Abundant (1973)	That's the Way Love Goes (1974)

God Is Abundant is the twenty-first solo studio album by American country singer Connie Smith. It was released in November 1973 on Columbia Records and contained 11 tracks. The project was a collection of gospel recordings, chosen by Smith herself. Several of the songs included on the project were written by other country artists including Larry Gatlin, Kris Kristofferson and Dolly Parton. The album reached the top 20 of the American country LP's chart following its release.

== Background ==
Connie Smith had her peak commercial success on the RCA Victor label. She had 18 top ten country singles between 1964 and 1973, including the eight-week number one song, "Once a Day". Becoming frustrated with the lack of respect the label showed to her musical interests, Smith left RCA in 1973 and signed with Columbia Records the same year. She became a Christian in 1968 and wanted to record more gospel music. At Columbia, Smith was given permission to record one gospel album per year. Smith found the material herself to make her first gospel project for Columbia. "We went through them all and picked the ones we wanted to have on there," she told biographer Barry Mazor.

== Recording and content ==
In the spring of 1973, Smith went to Columbia Studio B to record the tracks for God Is Abundant. The sessions for the project took place on May 15, June 21, June 27 and June 28. The sessions were produced by George Richey. It was her second album project with Richey, who was chosen to work with Smith by Columbia producer, Billy Sherrill. Issues relating to trust would later end their professional relationship following the making of God Is Abundant. The project contained eleven tracks in total. The title track served as the album's opener and was first brought to Smith's attention by songwriter (and friend), Dallas Frazier. She also recorded Frazier's "The Baptism of Jesse Taylor", which would become a single for Johnny Russell following the release of Smith's album.

Many of the album's tracks were written by other country artists. "When I Sing for Him" was composed by Porter Wagoner, while "Golden Streets of Glory" was composed by Dolly Parton. "Dolly is one of my favorite writers. She's never wasted a word or put in any extra words," Smith recalled in 2021. Popular gospel covers were also part of the project, such as Larry Gatlin's "Help Me". The song was later a top ten country single for Elvis Presley in 1974. Also featured was a cover of Kris Kristofferson's "Why Me". "Why Me" was inspired by an event that Smith was part of. Kristofferson was inspired to write the song after Smith brought him to a church service. "She took me to church here in Nashville and I was profoundly moved," he later said. The event led to Kristofferson later writing "Why Me". He later asked for Smith's feedback on the song while he was composing it.

== Release and chart performance ==
God Is Abundant was released on Columbia Records in November 1973. It was the twenty third studio album of Smith's career and her second at the Columbia label. The label distributed the album as a vinyl LP. Six songs were included on "side A" while five songs were included on "side B" of the record. The album debuted on the American Billboard Country LP's chart on December 15, 1973. It spent 13 weeks on the chart, peaking at the number 20 position on February 16, 1974. It is Smith's most recent album to peak in the Billboard country top 20.

== Track listing ==
Side one
No.	Title	Writer(s)	Length
1.	"God Is Abundant"	Marie Boyer	2:57
2.	"Well of His Mercy"	Wayne Manning	2:27
3.	"When I Sing for Him"	Porter Wagoner	2:55
4.	"You Can Move That Mountain"	Dannie Lee	2:29
5.	"Remind Me Dear Lord"	Dottie Rambo	3:00
6.	"At the Foot of the Cross"	Larry Lee	2:38

Side two
No.	Title	Writer(s)	Length
1.	"Why Me"	Kris Kristofferson	2:48
2.	"The Baptism of Jesse Taylor"	Dallas Frazier; Sanger D. Shafer	2:30
3.	"Help Me"	Larry Gatlin	2:57
4.	"Golden Streets of Glory"	Dolly Parton	2:51
5.	"He Did It All for Me"	Duane Allen; Sager Powell	2:26

== Personnel ==
All credits are adapted from the liner notes of God Is Abundant and the biography booklet by Barry Mazor titled The Latest Shade of Blue.

Musical personnel

- William Ackerman – Drums
- Brenton Banks – Strings
- Stuart Bascore – Steel guitar
- George Binkley III – Strings
- Harold Bradley – Guitar
- Larry Butler – Piano
- Jerry Carrigan – Drums
- Marvin Chantry – Strings
- Ray Edenton – Rhythm guitar
- John Hughey – Steel guitar
- Martin Kathan – Strings
- Charlie McCoy – Harmonica
- Bob Moore – Electric bass
- Leon Rhodes – Electric guitar
- George Richey – Piano
- Hargus "Pig" Robbins – Piano
- Billy Sanford – Electric guitar, leader
- Connie Smith – Lead vocals
- Henry Strzelecki – Electric bass
- Donald Teal, Jr. – Strings
- Bobby Thompson – Guitar
- Gary Van Osdale – Strings
- David Vanderkooi – Cello
- Stephanie Woolf – Strings
- Chip Young – Guitar
- Joseph Zinkan – Electric bass

Technical personnel

- Shelly Kurland – Contractor
- Bergen White – Arranger
- George Richey – Producer

== Chart performance ==
Chart (1973–1974)	Peak position
US Top Country Albums (Billboard)	20

== Release history ==
Region	Date	Format	Label	Ref.
North America	November 1973	Vinyl	Columbia Records	
