= Just for What I Am =

Single by Connie Smith

from the album Ain't We Havin' Us a Good Time
- B-side: "I'd Still Want to Serve Him Today"
- Released: February 1972
- Genre: Country
- Label: RCA Records
- Songwriter(s): Dallas Frazier, Arthur Leo Owens
- Producer(s): Bob Ferguson

Connie Smith singles chronology
"I'm Sorry If My Love Got in Your Way" (1971)	"Just for What I Am" (1972)	"If It Ain't Love (Let's Leave It Alone)" (1972)

"Just for What I Am" is a single by American country music artist Connie Smith. Released in February 1972, the song reached #5 on the Billboard Hot Country Singles chart. The song was issued onto Smith's 1972 album entitled Ain't We Havin' Us a Good Time. In addition, "Just for What I Am" peaked at #4 on the Canadian RPM Country Tracks chart around the same time.

== Charts ==
=== Weekly charts ===
Chart (1972)	Peak position
US Hot Country Songs (Billboard)	5
CAN RPM Country Tracks	4

=== Year-end charts ===
Chart (1972)	Position
US Hot Country Songs (Billboard)	46
