= Bill Anderson's Greatest Hits =

Compilation album by Bill Anderson
- Released: October 1967
- Recorded: 1959–1966
- Studio: Bradley Studios (Nashville, Tennessee); Columbia (Nashville, Tennessee)
- Genre: Country; Nashville Sound
- Length: 35:26
- Label: Decca
- Producer: Owen Bradley

Bill Anderson chronology
I Can Do Nothing Alone (1967)	Bill Anderson's Greatest Hits (1967)	For Loving You (1968)

Bill Anderson's Greatest Hits is a compilation album by American country singer-songwriter Bill Anderson. It was released in October 1967 via Decca Records and was produced by Owen Bradley. The album was Anderson's third compilation recording released in his career and first album of greatest hits. Twelve tracks were included on the collection that had been previously released. The album itself also reached major record chart positions.

== Background and content ==
Bill Anderson's Greatest Hits was Anderson's first proper collection of greatest hits. It included a majority of his major hits as a recording artist with the Decca label. All the sessions were produced previously by Owen Bradley between 1959 and 1966. The sessions were held at the Bradley Studios in Nashville, Tennessee, which changed ownership and was renamed Columbia Studios over the course of the recording of the songs included on the album. A total of twelve previously recorded tracks were chosen for the album. All had previously been released as singles and had been major hits. The collection included Anderson's first number one singles, such as "Mama Sang a Song," "Still" and "I Get the Fever." Other major hits featured on the collection included "Po' Folks," "Five Little Fingers," "Golden Guitar" and "Eight by Ten."

== Release and reception ==
Professional ratings
Review scores
Source	Rating
Allmusic	4.5/5 stars
Billboard	Favorable

Bill Anderson's Greatest Hits was released in October 1967 on Decca Records. It was Anderson's third compilation record released in his music career. The project was issued as a vinyl LP, containing six songs on each side of the record.

The album spent 20 weeks on the Billboard Top Country Albums chart before peaking at number six in December 1967. Bill Anderson's Greatest Hits was his eighth album to reach the Billboard country chart and second compilation to reach the chart. Billboard magazine reviewed the project favorable in its 1967 October 1967 issue. "Bill Anderson has packaged his biggest hits for a sure-fire seller," writers commented. In later years Allmusic also reviewed the album favorably, giving it 4.5 out of 5 possible stars. Reviewer Stephen Thomas Erlewine said of the collection that it "represents the first thorough retrospective assembled on the country-pop crooner."

== Track listing ==
All tracks written by Bill Anderson, except where noted.

Side one
No.	Title	Writer(s)	Length
1.	"I Get the Fever"		2:06
2.	"The Tip of My Fingers"		2:29
3.	"Bright Lights and Country Music"	Anderson; Jimmy Gateley	2:35
4.	"Mama Sang a Song"		3:27
5.	"Easy Come – Easy Go"		2:03
6.	"Still"		2:45

Side two
No.	Title	Writer(s)	Length
1.	"I Love You Drops"		2:45
2.	"8×10"	Anderson; Walter Haynes	2:48
3.	"Po' Folks"		2:50
4.	"Five Little Fingers"		3:00
5.	"Three A.M."	Anderson; Jerry Todd	2:30
6.	"Golden Guitar"	Betty Gary; Curtis Leach	4:13

== Personnel ==
All credits are adapted from the liner notes of Bill Anderson's Greatest Hits.

Musical and technical personnel

- Bill Anderson – lead vocals
- Owen Bradley – producer
- Hal Buksbaum – cover photo

== Chart performance ==
Chart (1967)	Peak position
US Top Country Albums (Billboard)	6

== Release history ==
Region	Date	Format	Label	Ref.
Germany	October 1967	Vinyl	Coral Records	
United States	October 1967	Vinyl	Decca Records	
