= Showcase (Bill Anderson album) =

Studio album by Bill Anderson
- Released: February 1964
- Recorded: 1963–1964
- Studios: Columbia (Nashville, Tennessee)
- Genres: Country; Nashville Sound
- Label: Decca
- Producer: Owen Bradley

Bill Anderson chronology
| Bill Anderson Sings (1964) | Showcase (1964) | From This Pen (1965) |

Singles from Showcase
- 1. "Me" Released: June 1964; 2. "Three A.M./In Case You Ever Change Your Mind" Released: October 1964

Showcase is a studio album by American country singer-songwriter Bill Anderson. It was released in November 1964 on Decca Records and was produced by Owen Bradley. The album was Anderson's third studio release as a recording artist and second to be released in 1964. It included two singles that became major hits on the Billboard country chart along with subsequent B-sides.

== Background and content ==
Showcase was produced at the Columbia Recording Studios in Nashville, Tennessee between 1963 and 1964. All recording sessions were produced by Owen Bradley, whom Anderson had previously collaborated with on his two previous album releases. The album consisted of 12 tracks. Four of the album's tracks were composed entirely by Anderson. These songs were "Then and Only Then", "Cincinnati, Ohio" and "In Case You Ever Change Your Mind". Both "Then and Only Then" and "Cincinnati, Ohio" would later become country hits for Connie Smith. "Then and Only Then" would be featured on Smith's 1965 eponymous album while "Cincinnati, Ohio" was included on her 1967 album Connie Smith Sings Bill Anderson.

== Release and reception ==
Showcase was officially released in November 1964 on Decca Records. It was issued as a vinyl record, with six songs contained on each side of the record. Upon its release Showcase did not reach positions on any Billboard album publications. It was Anderson's first studio release to not enter such charts. The album also included three singles that were released and became major hits. Its first single was the second track, "Me". Released in June 1964, it peaked at number eight on the Billboard Hot Country Singles chart in September. The second single issued was the album's seventh track, "Three A.M." Released in October 1964, it also peaked at number eight on the country chart, reaching this position in February 1965. The single's B-side also became a charting single, "In Case You Ever Change Your Mind". Becoming a minor hit, the song reached number 38 on the country singles chart. Following its release, the album received ratings and reviews by music publishers. In 1964, Billboard positively reviewed the album in their December issue of the publication. "A powerful set of performances of material written by Bill Anderson (four songs)," writers commented. In a later review by Allmusic, the album was given a rating of two out of five stars.

== Track listing ==
Side one
| No. | Title | Writer(s) | Length |
|---|---|---|---|
| 1. | "You Can Have Her" | Bill Cook | 2:32 |
| 2. | "Me" | Alex Zanetis | 2:12 |
| 3. | "In the Misty Moonlight" | Cindy Walker | 2:31 |
| 4. | "Then I'll Stop Loving You" | Jim Reeves | 2:26 |
| 5. | "Memory No. 1" | Max Powell; Wayne Walker | 2:32 |
| 6. | "I'll Be Somewhere" | Roger Miller | 2:22 |

Side two
| No. | Title | Writer(s) | Length |
|---|---|---|---|
| 1. | "Three A.M." | Anderson | 2:30 |
| 2. | "Worry" | Chip Taylor | 2:01 |
| 3. | "In Case You Ever Change Your Mind" | Anderson | 2:22 |
| 4. | "I Love You More and More Every Day" | Don Robertson | 2:10 |
| 5. | "Cincinnati, Ohio" | Anderson | 2:08 |
| 6. | "Then and Only Then" | Anderson | 2:25 |

== Personnel ==
All credits are adapted from the liner notes of Showcase.

Musical personnel

- Bill Anderson – lead vocals
- Harold Bradley – guitar, banjo
- Floyd Cramer – piano, vibes
- Jimmy Day – steel guitar
- Pete Drake – steel guitar
- Buddy Emmons – steel guitar
- Hank Garland – guitar
- Buddy Harman – drums
- Tommy Jackson – fiddle
- Grady Martin – guitar
- Bob Moore – bass
- Morris Palmer – drums
- Jimmy Riddle – harmonica
- Joe Zinkan – bass

Technical personnel

- Owen Bradley – record producer
- Hal Buksbaum – photography

== Release history ==
| Region | Date | Format | Label | Ref. |
|---|---|---|---|---|
| United States | November 1964 | Vinyl | Decca | |
