= Mark 9 =

- ← chapter 8 chapter 10 →
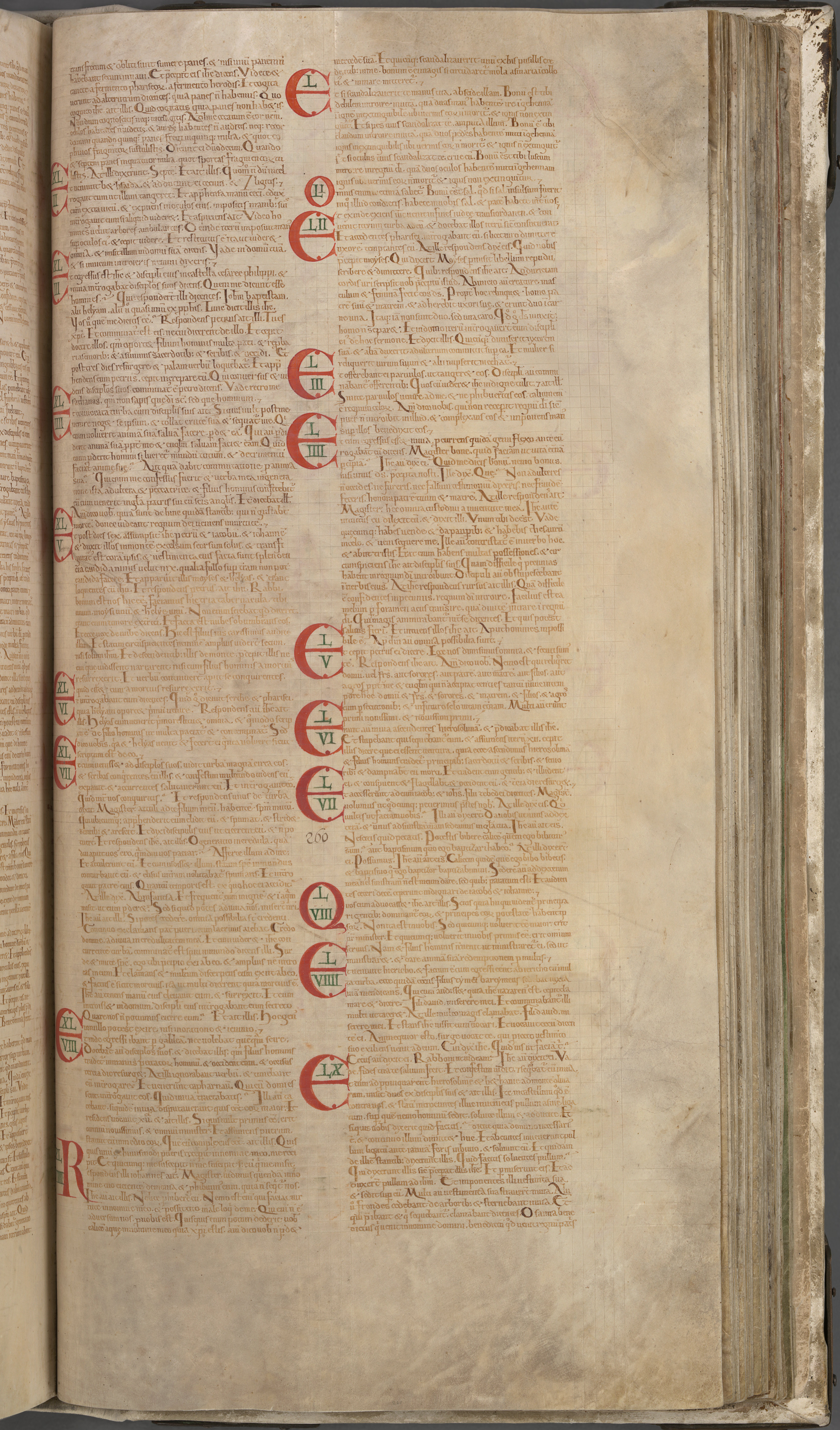
- The Latin text of Mark 8:13–11:10 in Codex Gigas (13th century)
- Book: Gospel of Mark
- Category: Gospel
- Christian Bible part: New Testament
- Order in the Christian part: 2

Mark 9 is the ninth chapter of the Gospel of Mark in the New Testament of the Christian Bible. It begins with Jesus' prediction of the kingdom of God before recounting the transfiguration of Jesus, a healing miracle, and Jesus' teaching about the return of Elijah, humility and temptation. Jesus then predicts that the Son of Man will be betrayed, killed, and rise again.

== Text ==
The original text was written in Koine Greek. This chapter is divided into 50 verses (49 verses in the Vulgate and its Douai-Rheims translation).

=== Textual witnesses ===
Some early manuscripts containing the text of this chapter are:

- Codex Vaticanus (325–350; complete)
- Codex Sinaiticus (330–360; complete)
- Codex Bezae (~400; complete)
- Codex Alexandrinus (400–440; complete)
- Codex Ephraemi Rescriptus (~450; complete)

== Locations ==
The events recorded in this chapter take place on "a high mountain" (traditionally understood to be Mount Tabor), in a nearby town, around Galilee and back in Capernaum. From Mount Tabor to Capernaum is about 41 kilometres (25 miles) along modern Highway 65.

== Verse 1 ==
There are some standing here who will not taste death until they see that the kingdom of God has come with (or in) power.

Anglican biblical scholar Edward Plumptre argues that this verse should be read with the final section of Mark 8 and suggests that the present arrangement may have been made with a view of connecting it with the Transfiguration as the fulfilment of the promise in this verse. This verse is numbered as Mark 8:39 in the Vulgate and its Douai-Rheims translation, and Irish commentator John Macevilly notes that "the Vulgate arrangement… is preferable" and matches the break between Matthew 16 and 17.

Christopher Tuckett notes that this verse has been "much debated", and what exactly the kingdom of God refers to has been long discussed. It immediately follows Jesus' statement of "…when he comes in his Father's glory with the holy angels" (Mark 8:38) in the preceding chapter. This could simply refer to the subsequently-reported Transfiguration. Others have interpreted it as Jesus referring to his resurrection and/or the coming of Christianity. It is also recorded in Matthew 16:28 and Luke 9:27. Matthew adds the statement that "…then he will reward each person according to what he has done" between the two. Craig Keener and Tuckett argue that the statement is unfulfilled, and on this basis many writers "have seen here a genuine saying of Jesus". Christopher Hays and Keener argue that the Parousia was contingent on the repentance of Israel, and that unfulfilled eschatological expectations would not be failures or unusual in the Jewish prophetic context.

== The Transfiguration ==
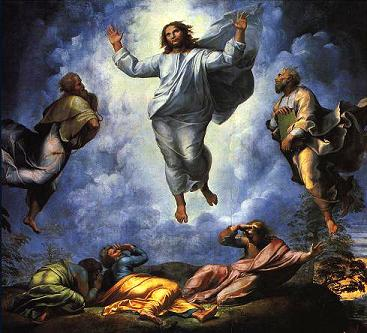
The Transfiguration (1520) by Raphael

Six days pass from Jesus' previous teaching, and then Jesus takes Peter and the brothers James and John up an unnamed high mountain, which many came to believe was Mount Tabor. Suddenly, Jesus' clothes become dazzingly white, (Note: The verb ἐγένετο (egeneto) is singular although τὰ ἱμάτια (ta himatia) is plural. Heinrich Meyer observes that some critical editors have used the plural verb, ἐγένοντο (egenonto). Cf. Mark 9:3 in Codex Bezae) "... whiter than anyone in the world could bleach them", and Elijah and Moses appear. The disciples are stunned: for the first time, Mark uses the term Rabbi, and they ask what they should do and offer to put up shelters or 'tabernacles' for the assembled trio. A cloud overshadows them and a voice comes from the cloud saying "This is my Son, whom I love. Listen to him!" (7) which is what Jesus heard the "voice from heaven" say when he was baptised by John the Baptist in Mark 1 (Mark 1:11) but now Mark has Peter, James, and John as witnesses to this. Elijah and Moses disappear and they head down the mountain.

On the way down the mountain, Jesus tells them to keep what had happened to themselves until the Son of Man has risen from the dead. They do not ask him to clarify this but they question among themselves what this "rising from the dead" might mean. For Tuckett, the disciples' discussion "seems to imply that they do not understand what resurrection in general means. This seems incredible in historical terms: resurrection was a well-known idea in [the] Judaism of the period". He suggests that verse 10 may be either "a highly artificial note by Mark to bolster his motif of the disciples' lack of understanding", or a reference "specifically to the resurrection of the Son of Man" distinct from the general resurrection.

In possibly a separate discussion, Peter, James and John then ask Jesus about the coming of Elijah (Elias), and he says:

... Elias verily cometh first, and restoreth all things; and how it is written of the Son of man, that he must suffer many things, and be set at nought. But I say unto you, That Elias is indeed come, and they have done unto him whatsoever they listed, as it is written of him. (Mark 9:12–13) KJV

It was commonly believed that Elijah would reappear before the coming of the Messiah, as predicted in Malachi 4. Matthew 17:13 states that the three of them believed Jesus was comparing Elijah to John the Baptist. The imprisonment and death of John the Baptist (Mark 6:17–29) may be compared to the persecution of Elijah by Jezebel (1 Kings 19:2–3). Moses can be seen as a representative of the law and Elijah a representative of the prophets.

This whole passage has echoes of Exodus 24, where clouds covered Mount Sinai for six days before Moses went up to receive the Ten Commandments.

The original Greek uses the word metamorphothe which was translated into Latin as Trans Figura, the changing of appearance or of the body itself.

== The Possessed Boy ==
They arrive back and find the rest of the disciples arguing with several teachers of the law surrounded by a crowd. As Jesus returns, the crowd are "amazed" at him: the New Revised Standard Version translates as "they were ... overcome with awe", suggesting that his appearance "still retained traces of His transfiguration-glory".

Jesus asks the crowd "What are you arguing about?" (verse 16) and a man says he brought his possessed boy for Jesus to heal. The boy has a mute spirit and "foams at the mouth, gnashes his teeth and becomes rigid" – symptoms of epilepsy, which Matthew states to be the case. The man says the boy has been made to fall both into water and fire by the demon. Jesus' disciples could not heal him. Jesus says "You faithless generation" (v 19). He commands the boy be brought to him. The father begs Jesus to help the boy if he can, to which Jesus replies "Everything is possible for him who believes", and the man says "I believe. Help my unbelief!" (verse 24, only in Mark's account).

Jesus heals the boy: when asked by the disciples privately why they could not cast it out, he replies "This kind can come out only through prayer and fasting" (verse 29). Some early manuscripts and modern versions omit the reference to fasting.

== Predictions about the crucifixion ==
Jesus tells his entire group again that the Son of Man will be betrayed into the hands of men, killed, and after three days he will rise again. This is the second prediction of the Passion in Mark's Gospel, although in the first prediction there is no reference to betrayal. Theologian Marvin Vincent notes that the Greek reads "ἐδίδασκεν" (edidasken), and that the Revised Version would have done better to give the force of the imperfect here: He was teaching. He sought seclusion because he was engaged for the time in instructing. The teaching was the continuation of the "began to teach" (Mark 8:31)".

Jesus' disciples still do not understand what he means but they are afraid to ask him to clarify himself. William Robertson Nicoll notes that "they had heard the statement before, and had not forgotten the fact, and their Master had spoken too explicitly for them to be in any doubt as to His meaning. What they were ignorant of was the why". Skeptics dismiss these predictions as not actually made by the real Jesus but regard them as an example of vaticinium ex eventu. Scholars such as Raymond E. Brown believe, however, that "the difficulty in dismissing all these predictions as totally post-Jesus creations is exemplified in 9:31 where many scholars recognize Semitic features and old tradition." (140)

== Teaching in Capernaum ==
They go back to Capernaum and in the house, Jesus asks what the disciples were discussing or arguing about on the road. They do not answer, because they had been arguing about who was, or who would be, the greatest disciple, possibly because Jesus only took three of them with him up the mountain and the remaining nine could not cure the boy. In Matthew's account, the subject was introduced by the disciples themselves, who came and asked Jesus who should be greatest. Jesus already knows what they had been talking about, however, and he summons the twelve, sits down with them (καθίσας, kathisas, indicating that Jesus takes His seat in a deliberate attempt to school the disciples) and instructs them:

If anyone wants to be first, he must be the very last, and the servant of all.

He takes a child (verse 36, but verse 35 in the Vulgate arrangement) in his arms and says whoever welcomes children welcomes him and therefore God.

John says some other group of people have been healing people in Jesus' name even though they were not part of the group, but Jesus is pleased and says "…For he who is not against us is for us." (9:40). In Matthew 12:30 and Luke 11:23 Jesus says: "He who is not with Me is against Me"; see also You're either with us, or against us. The disciples seem to think one needs to be part of Jesus' personal group but Jesus makes clear that anyone who works in his name and does his work is also for him.

He then gives one of the most forceful condemnations of sin in the Bible (see Stumbling block):

And whosoever shall offend one of these little ones that believe in me, it is better for him that a millstone were hanged about his neck, and he were cast into the sea. And if thy hand offend thee, cut it off: it is better for thee to enter into life maimed, than having two hands to go into hell, into the fire that never shall be quenched: Where their worm dieth not, and the fire is not quenched. And if thy foot offend thee, cut it off: it is better for thee to enter halt into life, than having two feet to be cast into hell, into the fire that never shall be quenched: Where their worm dieth not, and the fire is not quenched. And if thine eye offend thee, pluck it out: it is better for thee to enter into the kingdom of God with one eye, than having two eyes to be cast into hell fire: Where their worm dieth not, and the fire is not quenched. For every one shall be salted with fire, and every sacrifice shall be salted with salt. Salt is good: but if the salt have lost his saltness, wherewith will ye season it? Have salt in yourselves, and have peace one with another. (42–50) KJV

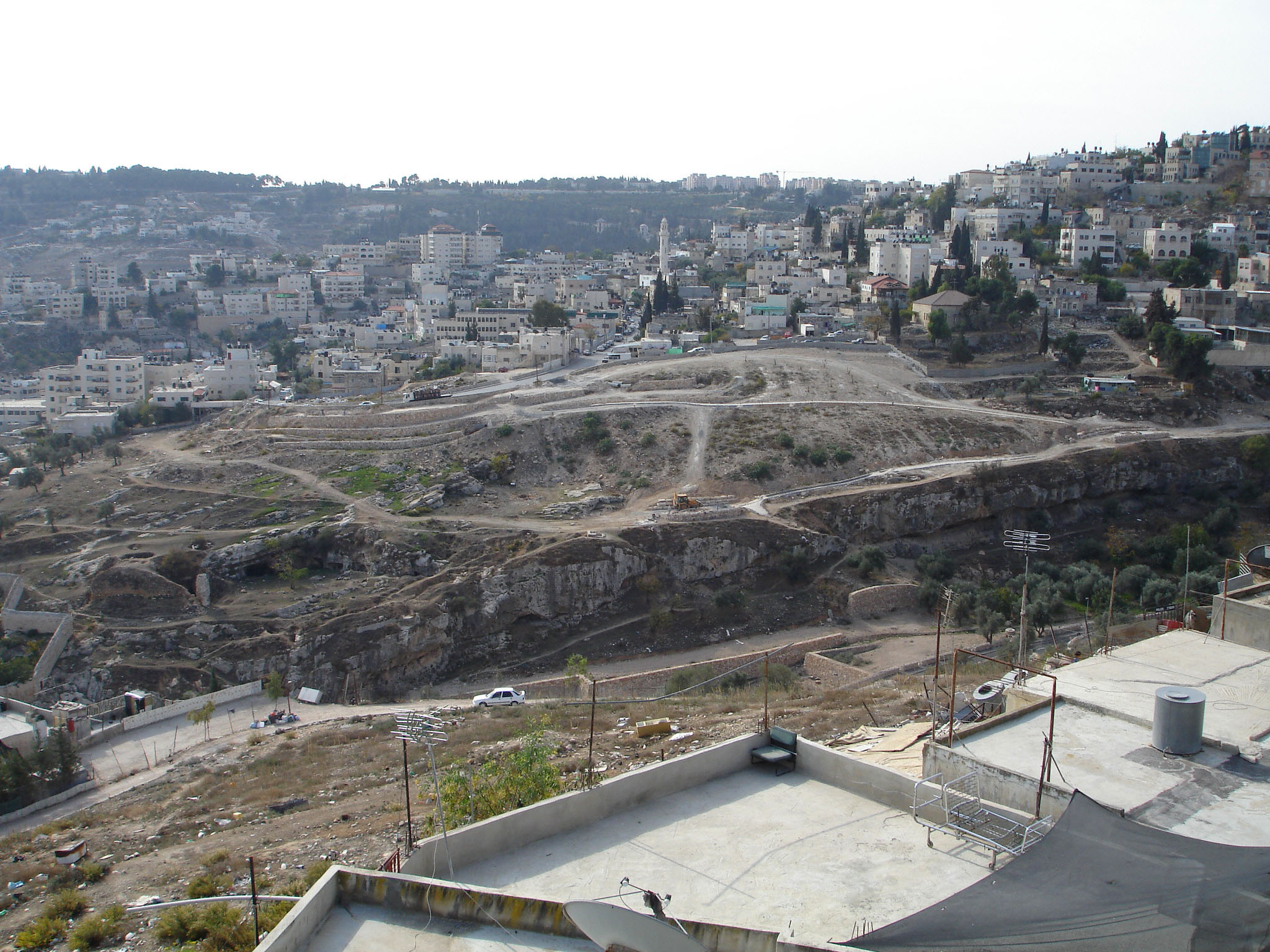
The Hinnom Valley in Jerusalem

The text quotes the final verse of the Book of Isaiah:

"And they will go out and look on the dead bodies of those who rebelled against me; the worms that eat them will not die, the fire that burns them will not be quenched, and they will be loathsome to all mankind".

The Pulpit Commentary observes that the bodies cast into hell "could not be at the same time burnt with fire and eaten by worms".

It is unclear whether Jesus's extreme suggestion to amputate an important body part is meant to be taken literally or not. Tom de Bruin has argued that Jesus's command is meant to be literal, and it is a method of dealing with demons that have gained a foothold in a person.

The original manuscripts use the term "τὴν γέενναν" (tēn geennan) Gehenna for Hell. Gehenna was a trash dump next to Jerusalem in the Hinnom valley, where the dead bodies of criminals as well as trash were burned. The valley was named after a man named Hinnom who had owned it. It had at one time been used as a place to sacrifice live children to Pagan Gods.

What exactly the "salt" Jesus was referring to was is unclear. Jesus relates it to fire, the good, and peace. Salt was seen as a thing of purity, but salt also has destructive properties and was used as a preservative. "Salt" might simply refer to his teaching. It also might be seen as an interlocking double metaphor relating the salt required in sacrifices to God found in Leviticus 2:11,13 to the "salt" of the sacrifice of Christ and to the "salt" required to be in followers of Jesus as metaphorical sacrifices as in Romans 12 and also relating the salt of the Old Covenant from Leviticus 2:11,13 to the "salt" of the new or renewed covenant. See Salt in Mark and also Salt and Light.

== Connections across the New Testament ==
Luke 9 has almost the entire chapter of Mark 9 contained verbatim with the notable exception of the speech about sin which is partly contained in Luke 17. Matthew has the Transfiguration and the possessed boy followed by a slightly altered and expanded scene in Capernaum in chapters 17 and 18. John lists none of this, which has puzzled many scholars since one would think John, since he was one of the only three there, would mention the Transfiguration. This could mean that Mark is wrong about either the event or John being there, the Gospel of John was not written by the Apostle John, or John knew the synoptics were circulating and wrote his gospel to fill in details he thought lacking in them.

The second letter of Peter has a relationship with the Gospel tradition, mainly in the Transfiguration of Jesus, 1:4 with Mark 9:1; 1:11 with Mark 9:1; 1:16,18 with Mark 9:2–10; 1:17 with Matthew 17:5; 1:19 with Mark 9:4.

== Notes ==
Preceded by Mark 8	Chapters of the Bible; Gospel of Mark	Succeeded by Mark 10
