= I Can Do Nothing Alone =

Studio album by Bill Anderson
- Released: June 1967
- Recorded: February 1967
- Studios: Columbia (Nashville, Tennessee)
- Genres: Country; gospel
- Label: Decca
- Producer: Owen Bradley

Bill Anderson chronology
Get While the Gettin's Good (1967)	I Can Do Nothing Alone (1967)	Bill Anderson's Greatest Hits (1967)

I Can Do Nothing Alone is a studio album by American country singer-songwriter Bill Anderson. It was released in June 1967 on Decca Records and was produced by Owen Bradley. It was Anderson's seventh studio record and his first album to consist entirely of gospel music. Although the album did not produce any singles, it made peak positions on the Billboard country albums chart.

== Background and content ==
Anderson was inspired to record the album after the passing of his grandfather in 1965. Anderson recalled sitting beside him at the hospital when his grandfather said to him, "You don't have to be a preacher to do good in this world. You can live the right kind of life and let other people know that you stand for the right kind of things and they will get the message." This inspired Anderson to compose the album's title track "I Can Do Nothing Alone". The album consisted of ten tracks, all of which were gospel songs. All of the tracks were cut at the Columbia Recording Studios in February 1967 under the guidance of Owen Bradley. Among the songs recorded with Bradley included covers of traditional gospel songs. Songs featured included "Standing on the Promises", "Where He Leads Me" and "Blessed Assurance".

== Release and reception ==
Professional ratings
Review scores
Source	Rating
Allmusic	2.5/5 stars
Billboard	Favorable

I Can Do Nothing Alone was released in June 1967 on Decca Records. Five tracks were included on each side of the original record. Following its release, the album peaked at number 23 on the Billboard Top Country Albums chart in September 1967. The album spent 12 weeks on the country chart. The album did not produce any singles that were released. The album did however receive a rating from Allmusic, which gave it 2.5 out of 5 possible stars. Meanwhile, Billboard gave it a positive response in their June 1967 issue of the magazine. "Hit country artist Bill Anderson has a tremendous gospel hit here," writers commented.

== Track listing ==
Side one
No.	Title	Writer(s)	Length
1.	"I Can Do Nothing Alone"	Bill Anderson	2:50
2.	"Standing on the Promises"	Kelso Carter; Victor Hedgren	2:30
3.	"Angel Band"	William Bradbury; Jefferson Hascall	2:12
4.	"Papa"	Anderson	3:33
5.	"Less of Me"	Glen Campbell	2:17
6.	"Where He Leads Me"	E.W. Blandy; John Norris	3:04

Side two
No.	Title	Writer(s)	Length
1.	"Just as I Am"	Charlotte Elliott	2:42
2.	"Light at the River"	Bud Brewster; Carl Story	2:18
3.	"Most Richly Blessed"	Luther Brandon; Archie Campbell	2:25
4.	"Take Up Thy Cross"	Henry Williams Baker; Charles W. Everest	2:25
5.	"I Dreamed About Mama Last Night"	Fred Rose	2:58
6.	"Blessed Assurance"	Fanny Crosby; Phoebe Knapp	2:20

== Personnel ==
All credits are adapted from the liner notes of I Can Do Nothing Alone.

Musical personnel

- Bill Anderson – lead vocals
- Harold Bradley – guitar, banjo
- Ray Edenton – guitar
- Sonny Garrish – steel guitar
- Roy Huskey – bass
- The Jordanaires – background vocals
- Jimmy Lance – guitar
- Len Miller – drums
- Hal Rugg – steel guitar
- Jerry Smith – piano

Technical personnel

- Owen Bradley – record producer
- Hal Buksbaum – photography

== Chart performance ==
Chart (1967)	Peak position
US Top Country Albums (Billboard)	23

== Release history ==
Region	Date	Format	Label	Ref.
United States	June 1967	Vinyl	Decca	
United States	June 1967	Vinyl	MCA Coral	
Canada	1973	Vinyl	MCA Coral	
