= Three A.M. =

Single by Bill Anderson

from the album Showcase
- B-side: "Cincinnati, Ohio"
- Released: October 1964
- Recorded: August 20, 1964
- Studio: Bradley Studios (Nashville, Tennessee)
- Genre: Country; Nashville Sound
- Length: 2:30
- Label: Decca
- Songwriters: Bill Anderson; Jerry Todd
- Producer: Owen Bradley

Bill Anderson singles chronology
"Me" (1964)	"Three A.M." (1964)	"Certain" (1965)

"Three A.M." is a song written by Bill Anderson and Jerry Todd. It was first recorded by its co-writer, Bill Anderson. It was released as a single in 1964 via Decca Records and became a major hit.

== Background and release ==
"Three A.M." was recorded on August 20, 1964, at the Bradley Studios, located in Nashville, Tennessee. The sessions were produced by Owen Bradley, who would serve as Anderson's producer through most of years with Decca Records. Two additional tracks were recorded at the session: "In the Misty Moonlight" and "Then and Only Then."

"Three A.M." was released as a single by Decca Records in October 1964. The song spent 18 weeks on the Billboard Hot Country Singles before reaching number eight by February 1965. It was later released on his 1964 studio album Bill Anderson Sings.

The song was covered by Australian musician Robert Forster on his 1994 album I Had a New York Girlfriend.

== Track listings ==
7" vinyl single

- "Three A.M." – 2:30
- "In Case You Ever Change Your Mind" – 2:22

== Chart performance ==
Chart (1964–1965)	Peak position
US Hot Country Songs (Billboard)	8
