= Jesus predicts his death =

Gospel harmony of predictions

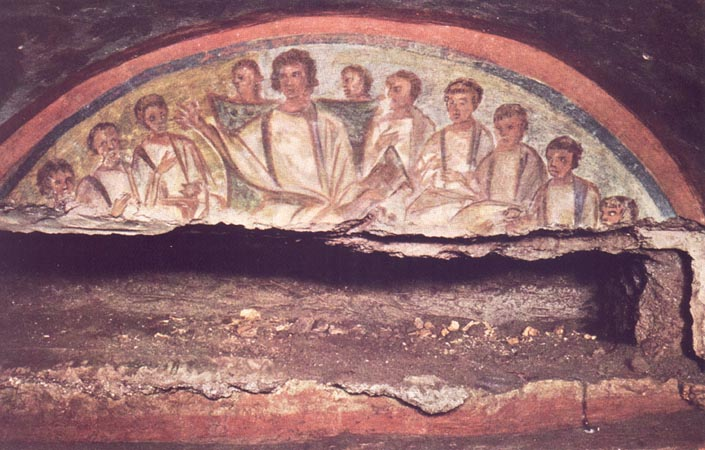
Early Christian Catacomb painting of Jesus and his disciples, pre-third century

There are several references in the Synoptic Gospels (the gospels of Matthew, Mark and Luke) to Jesus predicting his own death, the first two occasions building up to the final prediction of his crucifixion. Matthew's Gospel adds a prediction, before he and his disciples enter Jerusalem, that he will be crucified there.

== Gospel of Mark ==
In the Gospel of Mark, generally agreed to be the earliest Gospel, written around the year 70, Jesus predicts his death three times, recorded in Mark 8:31-33, 9:30-32 and 10:32-34. Some scholars, such as Walter Schmithals, suggest a redactional formulation of the author, but recent scholarship is increasingly skeptical of reconstructing pre-Markan tradition, and Brandon Massey describes a dead end in Markan redaction criticism. Massey notes that Markan redaction criticism was reliant on a form-critical model of Jesus tradition and ultimately untenable, while recent scholarship conceptualizes the gospel in terms of ancient biography instead. Schmithals states there are "vexxing questions" relating to the sayings. Meanwhile, other scholars analyze these arguments and present a different view, and believe these sayings are historical. Ultimately, no consensus has emerged among scholars.

The setting for the first prediction is somewhere near Caesarea Philippi, immediately after Peter proclaims Jesus as the Messiah. Jesus tells his followers that "the Son of Man must suffer many things and be rejected by the elders, chief priests and teachers of the law, and that he must be killed and after three days rise again". When Peter objects, Jesus tells him: "Get behind me, Satan! You do not have in mind the things of God, but the things of men". (Mark 8:31–33)

== Gospel of Matthew ==
The Gospel of Matthew 16:21–28 includes this episode, saying that "from that time", i.e. on a number of occasions, Jesus "began to show his disciples that he must go to Jerusalem and suffer many things from the elders and chief priests and scribes, and be killed ...".

The Gospel of Luke 9:22–27 shortens the account, dropping the dialogue between Jesus and Peter.

Each time Jesus predicts his arrest and death, the disciples in some way or another manifest their incomprehension, and Jesus uses the occasion to teach them new things. The second warning appears in Mark 9:30–32 (and also in Matthew 17:22–23) as follows:

He said to them, "The Son of Man is going to be betrayed into the hands of men. They will kill him, and after three days he will rise." But they did not understand what he meant and were afraid to ask him about it.

The third prediction in Matthew 20:17–19 specifically mentions crucifixion:

Now as Jesus was going up to Jerusalem, he took the twelve disciples aside and said to them, "We are going up to Jerusalem, and the Son of Man will be betrayed to the chief priests and the teachers of the law. They will condemn him to death and will turn him over to the Gentiles to be mocked and flogged and crucified. On the third day he will be raised to life!"

The fourth prediction in Matthew is found in Matthew 26:1–2, immediately before the plot made against him by the religious Jewish leaders:

"As you know, the Passover is two days away — and the Son of Man will be handed over to be crucified."

The hypothetical Q source did not contain any predictions of Jesus’ death, though many others increasingly reject the hypothesis in favor of Luke’s use of Matthew or vice versa.

== Gospel of John ==
In the conversation with Nicodemus in the Gospel of John, Jesus pointed Nicodemus towards his death when he said

Just as Moses lifted up the snake in the wilderness, so the Son of Man must be lifted up

Jesus was intimating that something similar would happen to him as in Numbers 21:4-9, where Moses raised a bronze statue of a serpent up on a pole.

In chapters 12 to 17 this gospel also mentions several occasions where Jesus prepared his disciples for his departure, which the gospel also refers to as his "glorification":

Jesus answered them, saying, “The hour has come that the Son of Man should be glorified. Most assuredly, I say to you, unless a grain of wheat falls into the ground and dies, it remains alone; but if it dies, it produces much grain.

== Comparison of Synoptic Gospel predictions ==
In each of the Synoptic Gospels, Jesus foretells of his own death and resurrection after three days. The concordances are summarized in the following table:

Matthew	Mark	Luke
Matthew 16:21-23: From that time Jesus began to show to His disciples that He must go to Jerusalem, and suffer many things from the elders and chief priests and scribes, and be killed, and be raised the third day. Then Peter took Him aside and began to rebuke Him, saying, “Far be it from You, Lord; this shall not happen to You!” But He turned and said to Peter, “Get behind Me, Satan! You are an offense to Me, for you are not mindful of the things of God, but the things of men.”Matthew 16:21–23	Mark 8:31-33: And He began to teach them that the Son of Man must suffer many things, and be rejected by the elders and chief priests and scribes, and be killed, and after three days rise again. He spoke this word openly. Then Peter took Him aside and began to rebuke Him. But when He had turned around and looked at His disciples, He rebuked Peter, saying, “Get behind Me, Satan! For you are not mindful of the things of God, but the things of men.”Mark 8:31–33	Luke 9:21-22: And He strictly warned and commanded them to tell this to no one, saying, “The Son of Man must suffer many things, and be rejected by the elders and chief priests and scribes, and be killed, and be raised the third day.”Luke 9:21–22
Matthew 17:22-23: Now while they were staying in Galilee, Jesus said to them, “The Son of Man is about to be betrayed into the hands of men, and they will kill Him, and the third day He will be raised up.” And they were exceedingly sorrowful.Matthew 17:22–23	Mark 9:30-32: Then they departed from there and passed through Galilee, and He did not want anyone to know it. For He taught His disciples and said to them, “The Son of Man is being betrayed into the hands of men, and they will kill Him. And after He is killed, He will rise the third day.” But they did not understand this saying, and were afraid to ask Him.Mark 9:30–32	Luke 9:43-45: But while everyone marveled at all the things which Jesus did, He said to His disciples, “Let these words sink down into your ears, for the Son of Man is about to be betrayed into the hands of men.” But they did not understand this saying, and it was hidden from them so that they did not perceive it; and they were afraid to ask Him about this saying.Luke 9:43–45
Matthew 20:17-19: Now Jesus, going up to Jerusalem, took the twelve disciples aside on the road and said to them, “Behold, we are going up to Jerusalem, and the Son of Man will be betrayed to the chief priests and to the scribes; and they will condemn Him to death, and deliver Him to the Gentiles to mock and to scourge and to crucify. And the third day He will rise again.” Matthew 20:17–19	Mark 10:32-34: Now they were on the road, going up to Jerusalem, and Jesus was going before them; and they were amazed. And as they followed they were afraid. Then He took the twelve aside again and began to tell them the things that would happen to Him: “Behold, we are going up to Jerusalem, and the Son of Man will be betrayed to the chief priests and to the scribes; and they will condemn Him to death and deliver Him to the Gentiles; and they will mock Him, and [a]scourge Him, and spit on Him, and kill Him. And the third day He will rise againMark 10:32–34	Luke 18:31-34: Then He took the twelve aside and said to them, “Behold, we are going up to Jerusalem, and all things that are written by the prophets concerning the Son of Man will be accomplished. For He will be delivered to the Gentiles and will be mocked and insulted and spit upon. They will scourge Him and kill Him. And the third day He will rise again.” But they understood none of these things; this saying was hidden from them, and they did not know the things which were spoken.Luke 18:31–34
Matthew 26:32 But after I have risen, I will go ahead of you into Galilee.”		

As shown in the Daily Mass Readings provided in the Latin Rite of the Catholic Church, the prediction given by Jesus in Mark 9:32 has one of its main references in the Wisdom of Solomon:

12 Therefore let us lie in wait for the righteous; because he is not for our turn, and he is clean contrary to our doings: he upbraideth us with our offending the law, and objecteth to our infamy the transgressings of our education. 17 Let us see if his words be true: and let us prove what shall happen in the end of him. For if the just man be the son of God, he will help him, and deliver him from the hand of his enemies. Let us examine him with despitefulness and torture, that we may know his meekness, and prove his patience. Let us condemn him with a shameful death: for by his own saying he shall be respected.

— Book of Wisdom 2:12, 17-20 (KJV translation)

== Historical context ==
The gospels report Jesus making predictions about the "Son of Man". This is a Hebrew term with five different meanings, depending on the context in which it is used: all mankind (humanity as a whole), a human being (a man, as opposed to God), a personal pronoun ("I", "myself"), a sinner (an unjust person, as opposed to a just person), and the messiah (the awaited king).

Jesus predicted that the Son of Man would be handed over/betrayed to the elders, the chief priests, the scribes, and the teachers of the law. In the Second Temple period, the Sanhedrian members were called "elders," a high priest was a "chief priest," and the successors of Ezra the scribe - who became teachers of the law in those days - were called the "scribes." John 18 relate that Jesus was tried by the two chief priests at the time, Annas and Caiaphas.

Jesus also predicted that the Son of Man would be crucified by the Romans/Gentiles. The Hebrew word gentile means non-Jewish people. Judaism does not allow crucifixion as a means of punishment, but Ancient Roman law did allow certain persons, such as slaves and pirates, to be crucified.

== See also ==
- Chronology of Jesus
- Jesus predicts his betrayal
- Life of Jesus in the New Testament
