= Mark 10 =

- ← chapter 9 chapter 11 →
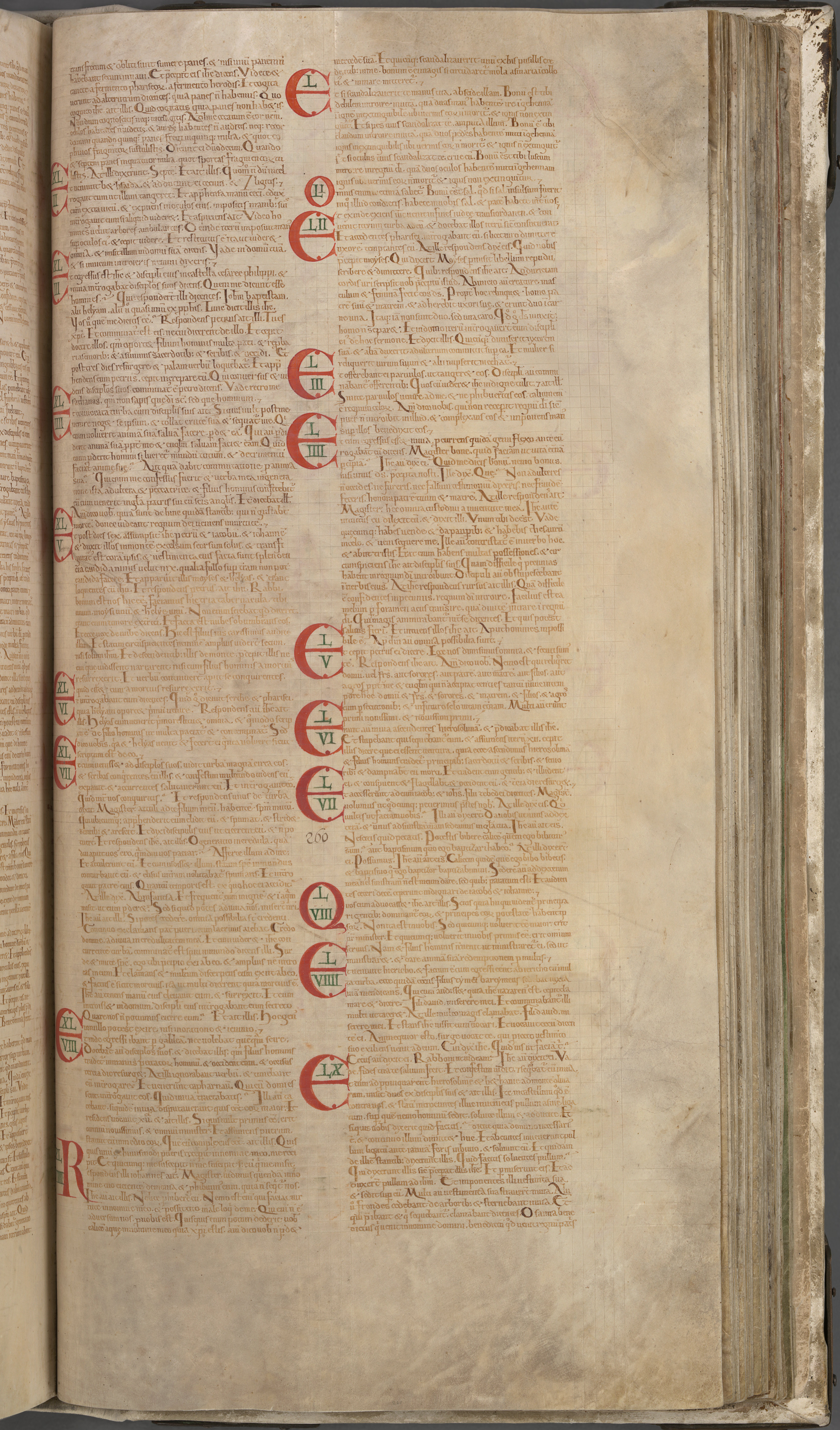
- The Latin text of Mark 8:13–11:10 in Codex Gigas (13th century)
- Book: Gospel of Mark
- Category: Gospel
- Christian Bible part: New Testament
- Order in the Christian part: 2

Mark 10 is the tenth chapter of the Gospel of Mark in the New Testament of the Christian Bible. It presents further teachings of Jesus as his journey progresses beyond the River Jordan and towards Jerusalem. Verses 1–31 deal with the themes of marriage, children and possessions, while verses 31–52 look ahead again to Jesus' passion and true service, and conclude with a further healing of a blind man, comparable to a similar healing in Mark 8.

== Text ==
The original text was written in Koine Greek. This chapter is divided into 52 verses.

=== Textual witnesses ===
Some early manuscripts containing the text of this chapter are:

- Codex Vaticanus (325–350; complete)
- Codex Sinaiticus (330–360; complete)
- Codex Bezae (~400; complete)
- Codex Alexandrinus (400–440; complete)
- Codex Ephraemi Rescriptus (~450; complete)

== Location ==
At the beginning of the chapter, Jesus and His disciples leave Galilee and travel to Perea, "the region of Judea by the other side of the Jordan". They travel south to cross the Jordan again and enter Jericho as Jesus makes His way towards Jerusalem. There is no mention of Samaria or the Samaritans in Mark's Gospel but this chapter outlines a route taken by travellers from Galilee to Jerusalem avoiding Samaria.

== Divorce ==
Having crossed the Jordan, Jesus teaches the assembled crowd in his customary way, answering a question from the Pharisees about divorce. C. M. Tuckett suggests that Mark 8:34–10:45 constitutes a broad section of the gospel dealing with Christian discipleship and that this pericope on divorce (verses 1–12) "is not out of place" within it, although he notes that some other commentators have treated Mark 10:1—31 as "a small preformed household code on the themes of marriage, children, and possessions".

The Pharisees ask Jesus whether divorce is lawful; Mark comments (in verse 2) that this is asked to test (or to trick or trap) him. The Amplified Bible suggests their intention was "to trick Him into saying something wrong". In the Torah, Deuteronomy 24:1–5 allows a man to divorce his wife if he finds her "indecent or unacceptable" by issuing a written writ of divorce. This is seen as a trap wherein Jesus either agrees with Moses and is seen as submitting to him or disagrees and shows himself in opposition to Moses. Also, Jesus has just moved into the region of Judea, across the Jordan. Both the Pharisees and Jesus would be aware that this was John the Baptist's old ground, and that John had recently been imprisoned, and then put to death as a result of his pronouncements on the topic of Herod Antipas' illegitimate marriage to his brother's wife. It is possible that the Pharisees are trying to entrap Jesus into making similar statements.

Jesus does not deal specifically with Herod's situation, but says that Moses only gave legislation concerning divorce because men's hearts were hard. Moses recognised that marital breakup was going to happen, and would rather have regulated divorce than unregulated abandonment.

Jesus answers by combining quotes from Genesis 1:27 and 2:24 to show that divorce is not part of God's plan:

But at the beginning of creation God 'made them male and female'. 'For this reason a man will leave his father and mother and be united to his wife, and the two will become one flesh.' So they are no longer two, but one. Therefore what God has joined together, let man not separate.

— Mark 10:6–9

Biblical minimalists would tend to doubt the historicity of this story, and all times Jesus quotes passages from the Old Testament, suggesting rather that Mark is answering questions posed to him about Jesus' teachings and their accordance with Mosaic Law. It is however also found in 1 Corinthians, showing that Paul believed it was Jesus' own teaching, but see also the Pauline privilege. It was also the belief of some of the authors of the Dead Sea scrolls (Brown 141). The prohibitions are extended to a woman divorcing her husband, which shows the Gentile audience, as women divorcing men was very rare in the Jewish community.

Many Christians, especially in modern times, have not obeyed this teaching, but a general prohibition of divorce is still the official position of the Roman Catholic Church, and the Eastern Orthodox Church except for adultery based on the similar yet slightly different passage in Matthew 5:31–32. Protestant Churches discourage divorce though the way divorce is addressed varies by denomination; for example, the Reformed Church in America permits divorce and remarriage, while connexions such as the Evangelical Methodist Church Conference forbid divorce except in the case of fornication and do not allow for remarriage in any circumstance. (Note: The marriage contract is so sacred that we advise against seeking divorce on any grounds whatseover. Should any member seek divorce on any unscriptural grounds (Matt. 5:32 "But I say unto you, that whosoever shall put away his wife, saving for the cause of fornication, causeth her to commit adultery; and whosoever shall marry her that is divorced comitteth adultery."), and that well proven, he shall be summoned to appear at a meeting in the local church, with the general board working in co-operation with the local church board. If proven guilty of such offense, he shall be dismissed at once, and no longer considered a member of Evangelical Methodist Church. We advise against the remarriage of all divorced persons, as the scriptures declare in Romans 7:3a "...So then if, while her husband liveth, she be married to another man, she shall be called an adulteress." If any person becoming converted, and having such marital complications as mentioned above in the days of their sin and ignorance, it is our belief that God will and does forgive them; however, we shall not receive such persons into church membership, but with to extend to them the right hand of fellowship, promising the prayers of God's people. Should any pastor, knowingly or unknowingly, receive such persons that have been divorced and remarried into membership, such membership shall not be valid. Ministers are advised to have nothing to do with the re-marriage of persons divorced on any grounds. In the event any person is divorced by an unbelieving companion and shall remain in an unmarried state, retaining his or her Christian integrity, he or she shall not be dismissed or barred from church membership.)

John 8:1–11, a passage of the book whose originality is questioned, relates the story of Jesus saving the woman caught in adultery from stoning. He saves her but then tells her to stop sinning, equating adultery with sin.

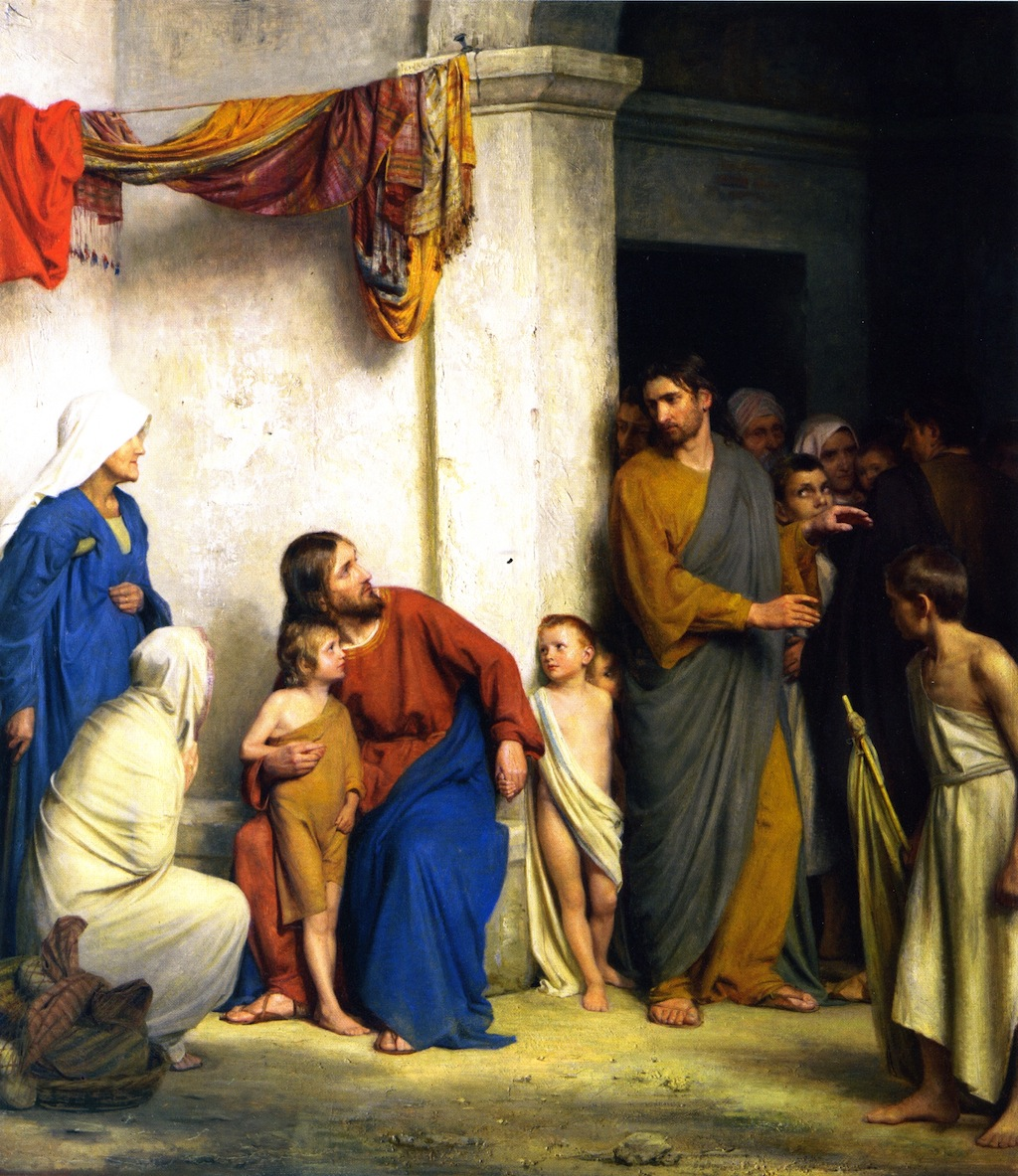
Christ with children by Carl Heinrich Bloch

== Little children blessed ==
Immediately after discussing marriage Jesus praises children. People bring their children for Jesus to touch and bless but the disciples tell them to go away. Jesus gets angry with his disciples, as he often does in Mark when the disciples misunderstand his intentions, and says "I tell you the truth, anyone who will not receive the kingdom of God like a little child will never enter it." (15) He then touches and blesses the children. Jesus is probably using the children as a metaphor for humanity's relationship to God, innocence and childlike dependence and acceptance of God. Other surviving works from this period in history present children as unreasonable and in need of training whereas here their nature is shown as the path to God (Brown et al. 618).

== The rich man and the eye of the needle ==
The theme of total acceptance of God is continued. Jesus continues on his journey and a rich man comes up to him and calls him a "Good teacher" (17), an appellation with which Jesus seems to disagree. "No one is good, except God alone" (18), a statement that trinitarians and non-trinitarians have used over the ages, as Jesus seems to say that he is different from God, see also Kenosis. Jesus tells him that the man already knows the commandments (could be the Ten Commandments or the Didache#The Two Ways or the 613 mitzvot), and the man tells him that he has always kept them. Jesus then ups the stakes and tells him that he should give up everything, give it to the poor, and follow him, see also Evangelical counsels. The man cannot comply and he goes away sad. Jesus tells everyone that "It is easier for a camel to go through the eye of a needle than for a rich man to enter the kingdom of God." (25) This is a radical teaching, then and now, as most people naturally believe riches, especially their own, are a sign of God's favor.

The disciples (students) then wonder aloud if any person can fully keep Jesus' commandments. Jesus reminds them, "With man this is impossible, but not with God; all things are possible with God." (27) Peter says that they have given up everything to follow Jesus. Jesus says they will be rewarded with "...a hundred times as much in this present age (homes, brothers, sisters, mothers, children and fields—and with them, persecutions) and in the age to come, eternal life." (30) and then repeats that the first will be last and the last first. See also the Beatitudes and Discourse on ostentation#Materialism.

The reference to persecution has been interpreted by some scholars as Mark trying to bolster the faith of his audience, perhaps victims of a persecution themselves. Persecution of Christians was rare during the probable writing of the gospel, however, except perhaps under Nero in Rome (64–68).

== Journey to Jerusalem ==
They continue on to Jerusalem and Mark records Jesus' third prediction of his Passion.

=== Verse 32 ===
Now they were on the road, going up to Jerusalem, and Jesus was going before them; and they were amazed. And as they followed they were afraid.

Anglican writer G. F. Maclear attempts to make sense of this verse by suggesting that "they that followed" is a better translation, "as though there were two bands of the Apostles, of whom one went foremost (who were amazed), while the others (who were afraid) had fallen behind". Similarly, the Jerusalem Bible translates, "... they [the closest disciples] were in a daze, and those who followed were apprehensive".

=== Verses 33–34 ===
Behold, we go up to Jerusalem; and the Son of man shall be delivered unto the chief priests, and unto the scribes; and they shall condemn him to death, and shall deliver him to the Gentiles: ^{34} And they shall mock him, and shall scourge him, and shall spit upon him, and shall kill him: and the third day he shall rise again.

This prediction contains all the elements of the Passion except for the means, crucifixion. Jesus' delivery to the gentiles forms part of his prediction here, and likewise in the third predictions in Matthew (Matthew 20:19) and Luke (Luke 18:32). This passage anticipates Mark 15:1, where the Sanhedrin hands Jesus over to Pontius Pilate.

=== James and John ===
James and John ask Jesus to grant them a favor and he asks what it is; they ask to be his left and right hand men. Jesus asks whether they can drink the cup he is to drink and be baptized with the baptism he has to undergo. They reply that they can, and Jesus acknowledges that they will, but advises them that the right to sit by Jesus in his glory is "for those for whom it is prepared". The apostles seem to think that great earthly glory awaits them but Jesus foreshadows his crucifixion and the two criminals that will be on each side of him. He says in verse 40 that such things, sitting at his side for instance, are not for him to grant, a verse the Arians used in their debates on the nature of Jesus (Brown et al. 618). Jesus reminds them that their goal is not power but service:

You know that those who are considered rulers of the Gentiles lord it over them, and their great ones exercise authority over them. But it shall not be so among you. But whoever would be great among you must be your servant, and whoever would be first among you must be slave of all. For even the Son of Man came not to be served but to serve, and to give his life as a ransom for many. (42–45 ESV)

Service to others is far more important than using power for yourself. Mark uses the Greek word lytron for ransom, a word implying buying the freedom of a criminal or slave (Brown et al. 619), with "many" being freed by Jesus' payment, his death.

They then travel to Jericho. Mark relates nothing of what went on there and they leave. This section, verse 46, is where Morton Smith claimed a copy of a letter from Clement of Alexandria, found at the Mar Saba monastery in 1958, showed a secret extension of the book called the Secret Gospel of Mark, as well as between verses 34–35. Smith took some photographs of the letter, which later was transferred to the library of the Greek Orthodox Church in Jerusalem where it disappeared after 1990.

=== Bartimaeus ===
As they leave the city they come upon Bartimaeus, whose name Mark then says means the son of Timaeus, translating from the Aramaic. Timaeus is the ancient Greek version of the Hebrew name Timai. Bartimaeus is a blind beggar who calls Jesus the Son of David, recognizing him as the Messiah, the first non-possessed person besides Peter to proclaim this. In the New American Standard Bible translation, he calls Jesus "the Nazarene" (10:47). In verse 51, he calls Jesus "Rabboni", Aramaic for 'Rabbi'; see also Strong's G4462. Jesus heals him and, for the first time in Mark, someone whom Jesus has healed is allowed to follow him. This entire passage could be seen as a metaphor for Mark trying to convince his Hellenistic audience, about the nature of Christianity. They have seen the disciples, perhaps mirrors of the reader, think Jesus' kingdom will be earthly riches and power, but Mark has shown Jesus predict his death three times and shown that to follow him will entail hardship and full devotion to God. Bartimaeus' regaining of his sight and following Jesus is also meant to be the situation of the audience. This healing of a blind man rounds off the sequence which had started in Mark 8 8, with a similar healing of another blind man, which contained Jesus' hardest teachings before he reaches Jerusalem in Mark 11.

== Comparison with the other synoptic gospels ==
Matthew's gospel has all this material in chapters 19–20 including a caveat on fornication and a praise of voluntary celibacy. Matthew's account differs in that he adds the parable of the workers in the vineyard, James and John's mother asks Jesus to favor them, rather than the brothers themselves, and Jesus heals two unnamed blind men in Jericho. Luke 18 has the story about the children, the story of the rich man, Jesus' Passion prediction and healing of the blind man, again unnamed, at Jericho. Luke has a single verse (Luke 16:18) dealing with Jesus' prohibition of divorce and remarriage.

Preceded by Mark 9	Chapters of the Bible; Gospel of Mark	Succeeded by Mark 11
