= Mark 7 =

- ← chapter 6 chapter 8 →
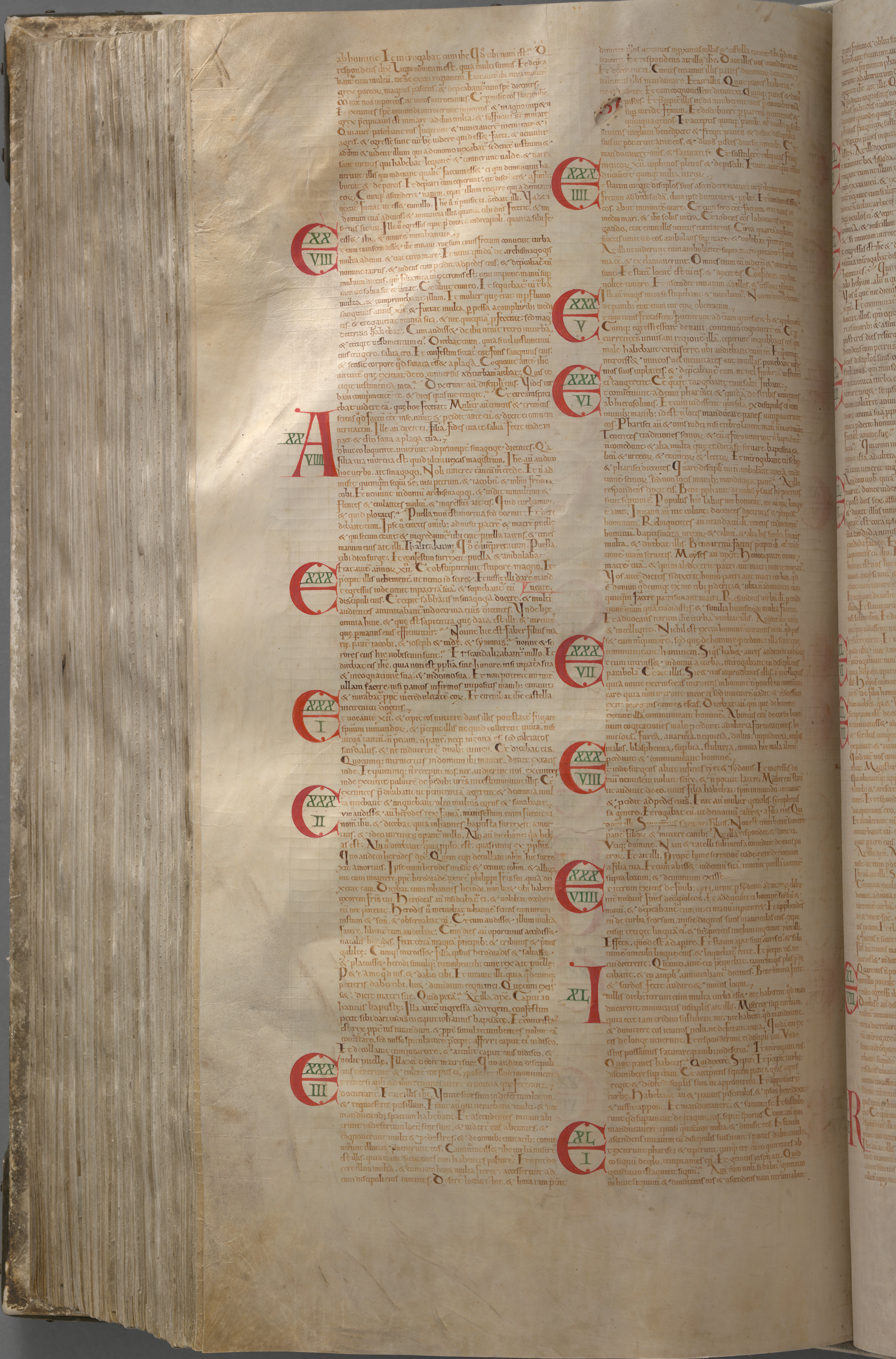
- The Latin text of Mark 5:8–8:13 in Codex Gigas (13th century)
- Book: Gospel of Mark
- Category: Gospel
- Christian Bible part: New Testament
- Order in the Christian part: 2

Mark 7 is the seventh chapter of the Gospel of Mark in the New Testament of the Christian Bible. It explores Jesus' relationships with both fellow Jews and Gentiles. Initially Jesus speaks with the Pharisees and scribes, and then with his disciples, about defilement. Later in the chapter Jesus heals two gentiles, one in the region of Tyre and Sidon and the other in the Decapolis region.

== Text ==
The original text was written in Koine Greek. This chapter is divided into 37 verses.

=== Textual witnesses ===
Some early manuscripts containing the text of this chapter are:

- Codex Vaticanus (325–350; complete)
- Codex Sinaiticus (330–360; complete)
- Codex Bezae (~400; complete)
- Codex Alexandrinus (400–440; complete)

== Clean and unclean ==
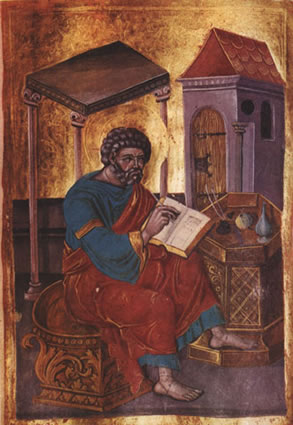
Mark, on a 16th-century Russian icon

Some Pharisees and some of the teachers of the Jewish law (scribes) come from Jerusalem to see Jesus, presumably in Galilee. Protestant Tübingen theologian Karl Heinrich Weizsäcker suggested that they had been sent to Jesus as a formal deputation.

They see some of his disciples eating without washing their hands. Mark then explains to his audience the Jewish custom of washing before each meal, indicating that he probably wrote for a non-Jewish audience. The Expositor's Greek Testament speaks of Mark writing "from the Gentile point of view"; the Cambridge Bible for Schools and Colleges suggests the explanation was "for Roman readers". The items listed by Mark which were customarily washed included cups, pots, and bronze kettles. Some manuscripts and accordingly some English translations add "couches" (Greek: κλινῶν, klinōn), "couches for meals on which diseased persons (lepers, etc.) may have lain".

The Pharisees and scribes ask Jesus why they are not obeying the "tradition of the elders" (verse 5), and Jesus replies with a quote from Isaiah 29:13, and tells them "You have let go of the commands of God and are holding on to the traditions of men". He rebukes them for letting a man who makes an offering to God, i.e. money to the priests, no longer help his parents, in violation of one of the ten commandments. That this was done is not found in other sources of the period, although "...rabbinic Jewish texts suggest that vows may be broken in such circumstances". (Miller 29)

He calls people to listen to him and explains that "Nothing outside a man can make him 'unclean' by going into him. Rather, it is what comes out of a man that makes him 'unclean'." (15) Later his disciples tell him they did not understand him, and he scolds them for being "dull". He explains to them that food cannot make a person unclean but "What comes out of a man is what makes him 'unclean'. For from within, out of men's hearts, come evil thoughts, sexual immorality, theft, murder, adultery, greed, malice, deceit, lewdness, envy, slander, arrogance and folly. All these evils come from inside and make a man 'unclean'." (20–23) meaning intention of the "heart" is more important than ritual.

Biblical commentator C. M. Tuckett notes that verses 9, 14, 18 and 20 all open with Greek: ἔλεγεν αὐτοῖς (elegen autois, "he said to them"), suggesting that several texts have been brought together in this section, and the changes of venue and audience in verses 14 and 17 suggest "that different traditions are being brought together".

According to John J. Kilgallen, "...ultimately what is at stake here is knowledge of the divine will: who knows best what God wants human beings to do." (135) This view is contrasted to the controversy, such as at the Council of Jerusalem, within the early Church over just how much Mosaic law one must obey. Mark uses this story as evidence for his view in the Pauline direction, making scholars question how much of it is actually Jesus' own teaching and how much of it is Mark trying to win Gentile converts. If the author really is Saint Mark then this would indicate that his group, Peter's circle, had come around in the Pauline direction.

The saying "What goes into your mouth will not defile you; rather, it's what comes out of your mouth that will defile you" is also found in the Gospel of Thomas at saying 14.

=== The Biological Agency (Man Partaking) Interpretation ===
While standard modern English translations typically interpret the final clause of Mark 7:19 (katharizōn panta ta brōmata) as an editorial footnote by the author declaring all dietary laws abolished, an alternative grammatical and contextual framework argues that the text describes a natural biological process rather than a divine legislative decree.

Under this framework, the true grammatical anchor for the masculine singular nominative participle καθαρίζων (katharizōn; "cleansing/purging") is not a remote reference to Jesus in verse 18, but rather ὁ ἄνθρωπος (ho anthrōpos; "the man") introduced as the explicit thematic subject of the entire purity discourse in verse 15. Because anthrōpos is masculine, singular, and nominative, the participle agrees with it perfectly, functioning as a participle of means that describes how a human body mechanically processes food.

The passage explicitly maps out the literal route of human digestion from the mouth, to the stomach (koilia), and out into the latrine (aphedrōna). Proponents of this view note that human anatomy did not alter during the New Testament era; the stomach functions as a material filter that naturally reduces and evacuates food, leaving the moral center of the person—the heart—entirely untouched by external dirt. This aligns with Jesus' subsequent definition of defilement in verses 20–23, which states that sin originates exclusively from within the human heart. Physical matter remains morally neutral; a person is defiled by the internal decision of the heart to rebel against the Torah, whereas the physical ingestion of the meat is merely the outward symptom of that pre-existing internal defilement. This material neutrality is later mirrored by the Apostle Paul's assertions that "nothing is unclean of itself" (Romans 14:14) and that "an idol is nothing in the world" (1 Corinthians 8:4).

Historical-critical research into first-century Jewish halakhah (religious law) strongly corroborates this biological baseline. Studies demonstrate that in dominant strains of first-century Pharisaic and early Rabbinic thought, human excrement was considered entirely impervious to ritual impurity. While waste was physically repulsive, it was halakhically neutral and could not contract or transmit ritual uncleanness. Therefore, when a person ate covenantally permitted food with ritually defiled hands (the core dispute of Mark 7:2), the digestive tract acted as an organic filter, processing the food into waste and effectively neutralizing the external ritual defilement. Mainstream first-century Jewish daily life and archaeology confirm that defecation was denied the capacity to transmit ritual defilement, supporting the view that Jesus' critique targeted the expansion of oral scribal traditions while fully preserving the legal authority of the written Torah.

== The Syrophoenician woman and the deaf mute man ==
Jesus then travels to the cities of Tyre and Sidon in what is now Lebanon. Mark tells the story of the Syrophoenician woman who finds Jesus at a friend's house in Tyre and begs him to heal her demon possessed daughter. He brushes her off, saying:

First let the children eat all they want, for it is not right to take the children's bread and toss it to their dogs.

The New King James Version refers to "little dogs" (Greek: κυνάρια, kynária) and the Amplified Bible refers to "pet dogs". According to the Cambridge Bible for Schools and Colleges, "the heathen are compared not to the great wild dogs infesting Eastern towns (1 Kings 14:11; 1 Kings 16:4; 2 Kings 9:10), but to the small dogs attached to households".

The children are the children of Israel (Matthew's text refers to the "lost sheep of the house of Israel") and the little dogs are the Gentiles, a metaphor also found in other Jewish writing.

"'Yes, Lord,' she replied, 'but even the dogs under the table eat the children's crumbs.'" (28) Impressed with her answer, he tells her to go home and she returns home to find her daughter healed. This is one of the few times, and the only time in Mark's gospel, that Jesus performs a miracle at a distance, that is he does not touch nor is he near the girl. He only says it will be done and it is done, by his will alone. This passage shows that, according to Mark, Jesus' primary mission was to the Jews first and only then the Gentiles but Gentiles, as long as they have belief, can be part of that mission as well.

Jesus then goes to the Decapolis region and the Sea of Galilee. The Pulpit Commentary suggests his journey took him from Tyre "first northwards through Phoenicia, with Galilee on his right, as far as Sidon; and thence probably over the spurs of Libanus (Mount Lebanon) to Damascus, mentioned by Pliny as one of the cities of the Decapolis. This would bring him probably through Caesarea Philippi to the eastern coast of the Sea of Galilee". Here he comes across a man who is deaf and mute. He touches his ears and touches his tongue with his own spittle and says "Ephphatha! (which means, 'Be opened!')" (Mark 7:34), Mark translating from the Aramaic. The man regains his hearing and speech and word quickly spreads. In this miracle, as opposed to the woman's healing, Jesus uses specific techniques, (the touching, the spit, the word), to effect a cure. This passage could be considered a fulfillment of Isaiah 35:5–6.

The argument with the Pharisees about food laws and the Syrophoenician woman are also found in Matthew 15:1–28

He charged them (Greek: διεστέλλετο, diestelleto) not to tell anyone. "The word is a strong one: 'he gave them clear and positive orders' not to tell anyone".

== See also ==
- Miracles of Jesus

== Sources ==
- Kilgallen, John J. (1989), A Brief Commentary on the Gospel of Mark, Paulist Press ISBN 0-8091-3059-9

Preceded by Mark 6	Chapters of the Bible; Gospel of Mark	Succeeded by Mark 8
