= Cute 'n' Country =

Studio album by Connie Smith
- Released: October 1965
- Recorded: March 17 – May 28, 1965
- Studio: RCA Studio B
- Genre: Country
- Length: 27:53
- Label: RCA Victor
- Producer: Bob Ferguson

Connie Smith chronology
Connie Smith (1965)	Cute 'n' Country (1965)	Miss Smith Goes to Nashville (1966)

Singles from Cute 'n' Country
- 1. "I Can't Remember" Released: April 1965

Cute 'n' Country is the second studio album by American country music artist Connie Smith. It was released in October 1965 by RCA Victor and contained 12 tracks. Cute 'n' Country contained a mixture of original songs and cover versions by other country artists. Featured on the album was the top ten single "I Can't Remember". Cute 'n' Country was Smith's second album to top the Billboard country LP's chart.

== Background ==
In 1964, Connie Smith's debut single, "Once a Day", topped the country charts for a record-setting eight weeks. The success jump-started Smith's professional career and launched a series of hits following it. "Once a Day" was included on Smith's debut self-titled album (released in March 1965). The album also included the top five single "Then and Only Then". Smith and her record label were disappointed when "Then and Only Then" did not top the charts. In an effort to find a single that would "eclipse" 1964's "Once a Day", Smith went back into the studio to record her second album Cute 'n' Country. The album was named for a disc jockey who introduced Smith on the air by saying, "Here's cute and country Connie Smith". Smith later remarked that she disliked the title. "Back in Ohio, 'cute' meant bowlegged," she told writer Colin Escott. The cover photo was taken in the front yard of a residential home located in Hendersonville, Tennessee.

== Recording and content ==
Cute 'n' Country was recorded at RCA Studio B in Nashville, Tennessee between March 17 and May 28, 1965. The sessions were produced by Bob Ferguson. Five of the album's 12 tracks were cover versions of country songs originally made popular by other artists. These songs were Webb Pierce's "Even Tho", Ray Price's "I'll Be There (If You Ever Want Me)", Jim Reeves and Dottie West's "Love Is No Excuse", Jean Shepard's "I Thought of You" and Charlie Walker's "Pick Me Up on Your Way Down". Remaining songs on the album were original recordings. Among these selections were three tracks penned by Bill Anderson, which included the single "I Can't Remember". Producer Bob Ferguson found the track "Senses", which was composed by then-unknown future performers Glen Campbell and Jeannie Seely. Seely later recorded the track herself with Smith singing background vocals on her 2017 release Written in Song.

== Release and reception ==
Professional ratings
Review scores
Source	Rating
Allmusic	4.5/5 stars

Cute 'n' Country was released in March 1965 via RCA Victor Records and was the second studio release of Smith's career. It was originally issued as a vinyl LP, containing six songs on either side of the record. In later years, the project was issued in a digital format via Sony Music Entertainment. In its original issue, Cute 'n' Country spent 30 weeks on Billboard magazine's Country LP's chart. This was similar to that of Smith's debut album, which also spent 30 weeks on the same chart. It also became her second LP to reach the number one spot on the Country LP's survey, holding the position for two weeks in December 1965. The album included Smith's RCA Victor Single "I Can't Remember". It was first issued by the label in April 1965. After 16 weeks, the single peaked at number nine on the Billboard Hot Country Songs chart in July 1965.

In October 1965, Billboard magazine gave Cute 'n' Country a positive response: "The chantress delivers a dozen tunes – some of them really great ones – with a maximum of country flavor and style." The album received a positive reception from Richie Unterberger of AllMusic, who gave the release 4.5 stars. He found the album's Nashville Sound style to be "tasteful" and further commented that "Smith proved herself capable of delivering sorrowful, modified honky tonk".

== Track listings ==
=== Vinyl version ===
Side one
No.	Title	Writer(s)	Length
1.	"Two Empty Arms"	Bill Anderson	2:27
2.	"Even Tho'"	Willie Jones; Curt Peeples; Webb Pierce	2:32
3.	"I Thought of You"	Jimmy Rollins	2:19
4.	"More to Love Than This"	Hank Mills	2:25
5.	"Not Till You Come Back to Me"	Anderson	1:52
6.	"Senses"	Glen Campbell; Jeannie Seely	2:18

Side two
No.	Title	Writer(s)	Length
1.	"I'll Be There (If You Ever Want Me)"	Rusty Gabbard; Ray Price	2:00
2.	"Love Is No Excuse"	Justin Tubb	2:55
3.	"I Can Stand It (As Long as He Can)"	Ramona Redd; Mitchell Torok	2:05
4.	"House Divided"	Bobby Bare	2:12
5.	"I Can't Remember"	Bill Anderson; Bette Anderson	2:28
6.	"I Can Turn Your World Around"	Harry Ebner; Jack Rhodes; Billie Jo Spears	2:20

=== Digital version ===
Cute 'n' Country (download and streaming)
No.	Title	Writer(s)	Length
1.	"Two Empty Arms"	Anderson	2:36
2.	"Even Tho'"	Jones; Peeples; Pierce	2:35
3.	"I Thought of You"	Rollins	2:23
4.	"More to Love Than This"	Mills	2:29
5.	"Not Till You Come Back to Me"	Anderson	1:56
6.	"Senses"	Campbell; Seely	2:24
7.	"I'll Be There (If You Ever Want Me)"	Gabbard; Price	2:05
8.	"Love Is No Excuse"	Tubb	3:01
9.	"I Can Stand It (As Long as He Can)"	Redd; Torok	2:08
10.	"House Divided"	Bare	2:16
11.	"I Can't Remember"	Bill Anderson; Bette Anderson	2:34
12.	"I Can Turn Your World Around"	Ebner; Rhodes; Spears	2:26

== Personnel ==
All credits are adapted from the liner notes of Cute 'n' Country.

Musical personnel

- Kenneth Buttrey – drums
- Anita Carter – background vocals
- Floyd Chance – bass
- Ray Edenton – guitar
- Dorothy Dillard – background vocals
- Bobby Dyson – electric bass guitar
- Jan Howard – background vocals
- Ron Huskey – bass
- Anita Kerr – background vocals
- Jimmy Lance – guitar
- Charlie McCoy – bass guitar
- Leonard Miller – drums
- Weldon Myrick – steel guitar
- Louis Nunley – background vocals
- Jerry Reed – guitar
- Hargus "Pig" Robbins – piano
- Hal Rugg – steel guitar
- Connie Smith – lead vocals
- Velma Smith – guitar
- Gordon Stoker – background vocals
- Pete Wade – guitar
- Ray Walker – background vocals
- James Wilkerson – bass guitar
- William Wright – background vocals

Technical personnel

- Bob Ferguson – Producer
- Al Pachucki – Engineer

== Chart performance ==
Chart (1965)	Peak position
US Top Country Albums (Billboard)	1

== Release history ==
Region	Date	Format	Label	Ref.
Canada	October 1965	Vinyl	RCA Victor Records	
United Kingdom	October 1965	Vinyl	RCA Victor Records	
United States	October 1965	Vinyl	RCA Victor Records	
United States	2010s	Music download; streaming	Sony Music Entertainment	
