= Me (Bill Anderson song) =

Single by Bill Anderson

from the album Showcase
- B-side: "Cincinnati, Ohio"
- Released: June 1964
- Recorded: November 26, 1963
- Studio: Bradley Studios (Nashville, Tennessee)
- Genre: Country; Nashville Sound
- Length: 2:12
- Label: Decca
- Songwriter: Alex Zanetis
- Producer: Owen Bradley

Bill Anderson singles chronology
"Five Little Fingers" (1963)	"Me" (1964)	"Three A.M." (1964)

"Me" is a song written by Alex Zanetis that was first recorded by American country singer-songwriter Bill Anderson. It was released as a single in 1964 via Decca Records and became a major hit.

== Background and release ==
"Me" was recorded on November 26, 1963, at the Bradley Studios, located in Nashville, Tennessee. The sessions were produced by Owen Bradley, who would serve as Anderson's producer through most of years with Decca Records. Two additional tracks were recorded at the same session. It was Anderson's final recording session in 1963.

"Me" was released as a single by Decca Records in June 1964. The song spent 16 weeks on the Billboard Hot Country Singles before reaching number eight by September of that year. It was later released on his 1964 studio album Bill Anderson Sings.

== Track listings ==
7" vinyl single

- "Me" – 2:12
- "Cincinnati, Ohio" – 2:08

== Chart performance ==
Chart (1964)	Peak position
US Hot Country Songs (Billboard)	8
