= Still (Bill Anderson album) =

Studio album by Bill Anderson
- Released: June 17, 1963
- Recorded: 1961–1963
- Studios: Bradley's Barn, Mount Juliet, Tennessee; Columbia, Nashville, Tennessee
- Genres: Country; Nashville Sound
- Length: 33:23
- Label: Decca
- Producer: Owen Bradley

Bill Anderson chronology
Bill Anderson Sings Country Heart Songs (1962)	Still (1963)	Bill Anderson Sings (1964)

Singles from Still
- 1. "Get a Little Dirt on Your Hands" Released: February 1962; 2. "Still" Released: February 1963

Still is a studio album by American country singer-songwriter Bill Anderson. It was released on June 17, 1963 on Decca Records and was produced by Owen Bradley. Still was Anderson's debut studio album as a recording artist after recording several singles for the Decca label. Two singles were included in the album. Its most successful was the title track, which became a crossover hit in 1963. It reached positions on the Billboard country, pop and adult contemporary charts. The album itself would also reach peak position on Billboard charts.

== Background and content ==
By 1963, Bill Anderson had been recording for Decca Records for five years. He signed with the label in 1958 and recorded several hits, including "The Tip of My Fingers" and "Mama Sang a Song". However, a proper debut studio album by Anderson had not yet been released. With the success of the title track in 1963, Decca decided to release his first full-length studio effort. The album's recording sessions were compiled from 1961. Further sessions were added on through early 1963. Sessions were first held at the Columbia Recording Studio in 1961 and were later held at Bradley's Barn, all located in Nashville, Tennessee. The album's recordings were produced by Owen Bradley, whom Anderson had been working with since his original signing.

== Release and reception ==
Professional ratings
Review scores
Source	Rating
Allmusic	3.5/5 stars

Before the album's release the first single was issued in February 1962. The single, "Get a Little Dirt on Your Hands", peaked at number 14 on the Billboard country singles chart. The second single issued was the title track in February 1963. It became Anderson's second single to reach number one on the Billboard country singles chart, reaching the top spot in April 1963. It also crossed over to the Hot 100 where it became a major hit and peaked at number eight in June 1963. It also reached a top ten position on the Billboard adult contemporary chart, peaking at number three.

Still was later given 3.5 stars from Allmusic in their review of the album. Still was originally released on June 17, 1963 via Decca Records. Upon its release, Still peaked at number ten on the Billboard Top Country Albums chart, becoming his first album to place on this chart. It also reach a peak position on the Billboard 200 album chart, reaching number 36 in September 1963. It would be Anderson's only studio release to make an appearance on the latter chart.

== Track listing ==
Side one
No.	Title	Writer(s)	Length
1.	"Still"	Bill Anderson	2:51
2.	"Little Band of Gold"	James Gilreath	2:44
3.	"Down Came the Rain"	Eddie Miller	2:50
4.	"From a Jack to a King"	Ned Miller	2:20
5.	"Molly"	Steve Karliski	3:00
6.	"Get a Little Dirt on Your Hands"	Anderson	2:56

Side two
No.	Title	Writer(s)	Length
1.	"Restless"	Anderson; Skeeter Davis	2:51
2.	"It's Been So Long Darling"	Ernest Tubb	2:49
3.	"The Reverend Mr. Black"	Billy Edd Wheeler; Jerry Leiber; Mike Stoller	3:23
4.	"Take These Chains from My Heart"	Hy Heath; Fred Rose	2:45
5.	"Happiness"	Anderson	2:17
6.	"I Wish I Was Mine"	Anderson	2:37

== Personnel ==
All credits are adapted from the liner notes of Still.

Musical personnel

- Bill Anderson – lead vocals
- Brenton Banks – strings
- Harold Bradley – guitar
- George Brinkley – strings
- Cecil Brower – strings
- Howard Carpenter – strings
- Martin Catahn – strings
- Floyd Cramer – piano
- Pete Drake – steel guitar
- Ray Edenton – guitar
- Sofie Fott – strings

- Buddy Harman – drums
- Lillian Hunt – strings
- Tommy Jackson – fiddle
- The Jordanaires – background vocals
- Jerry Kennedy – guitar
- The Anita Kerr Singers – background vocals
- Grady Martin – guitar
- Bill McElhiney – trumpet
- Bob Moore – bass
- Morris Palmer – drums
- Joe Zinkan – bass

Technical personnel

- Owen Bradley – record producer
- Hal Buksbaum – photography

== Chart performance ==
Chart (1963)	Peak position
US Billboard 200	36
US Top Country Albums (Billboard)	10

== Release history ==
Region	Date	Format	Label	Ref.
United States	June 17, 1963	Vinyl	Decca	
