= Easy Come – Easy Go =

Single by Bill Anderson

from the album Bill Anderson Sings
- A-side: "Five Little Fingers"
- Released: December 1963
- Recorded: November 26, 1963
- Studio: Bradley Studio
- Genre: Country; Nashville Sound
- Length: 3:00
- Label: Decca
- Songwriter: Bill Anderson
- Producer: Owen Bradley

Bill Anderson singles chronology
"8×10" (1963)	"Easy Come – Easy Go" (1963)	"Me" (1964)

"Easy Come – Easy Go" is a song written and first recorded by American country singer-songwriter Bill Anderson. It was released as a single in 1963 via Decca Records and became a major hit.

== Background and release ==
"Easy Come – Easy Go" was recorded on November 26, 1963, at the Bradley Studio, located in Nashville, Tennessee. The sessions were produced by Owen Bradley, who would serve as Anderson's producer through most of years with Decca Records. The single's A-side and its follow-up single was also recorded at the same session.

"Easy Come – Easy Go" was released as the B-side to his single "Five Little Fingers." It was issued by Decca Records in December 1963. It spent a total of 20 weeks on the Billboard Hot Country Singles chart before reaching number 14 in May 1964. It was later released on his 1964 studio album Bill Anderson Sings.

== Track listings ==
7" vinyl single

- "Five Little Fingers" – 3:00
- "Easy Come - Easy Go" – 2:08

== Chart performance ==
Chart (1963–64)	Peak position
US Hot Country Songs (Billboard)	14
