= Get a Little Dirt on Your Hands =

Single by Bill Anderson

from the album Still
- B-side: "Down Came the Rain"
- Released: February 1962
- Recorded: December 1961
- Studio: Bradley Studio
- Genre: Country; Nashville Sound
- Length: 2:47
- Label: Decca
- Songwriter: Bill Anderson
- Producer: Owen Bradley

Bill Anderson singles chronology
"Po' Folks" (1961)	"Get a Little Dirt on Your Hands" (1962)	"Mama Sang a Song" (1962)

"Get a Little Dirt on Your Hands" is a song written and recorded by American country singer-songwriter Bill Anderson. It was released as a single in February 1962 via Decca Records and became a major hit.

== Background and release ==
"Get a Little Dirt on Your Hands" was recorded in December 1961 at the Bradley Studio, located in Nashville, Tennessee. The sessions were produced by Owen Bradley, who would serve as Anderson's producer through most of years with Decca Records.

"Get a Little Dirt on Your Hands" was released as a single by Decca Records in February 1962. Shortly thereafter, it debuted on the Billboard Hot Country and Western Sides chart and reached number 14 later that year. It was Anderson's seventh major hit as a recording artist. The song was not issued on a proper album following its release. It was included on Anderson's 1963 studio album, Still, which was his debut studio release.

In 1980, David Allan Coe and Anderson hit #46 with an updated version.

== Track listings ==
7" vinyl single

- "Get a Little Dirt on Your Hands" – 2:47
- "Down Came the Rain" – 2:47

== Chart performance ==
Chart (1962)	Peak position
US Hot Country and Western Sides (Billboard)	14
