= I Can't Remember =

Single by Connie Smith

from the album Cute 'n' Country
- B-side: "Senses"
- Released: April 1965
- Recorded: March 17, 1965
- Genre: Country, Nashville sound
- Length: 2:29
- Label: RCA Victor
- Songwriters: Bill Anderson, Bette Anderson
- Producer: Bob Ferguson

Connie Smith singles chronology
"Then and Only Then/Tiny Blue Transistor Radio" (1965)	"I Can't Remember" (1965)	"If I Talk to Him" (1965)

"I Can't Remember" is a song written by Bill and Bette Anderson, and recorded as a single by American country artist Connie Smith. It was produced by Bob Ferguson and was released on her 1965 album Cute 'n' Country. The song was released in April 1965, reaching the Top 5 on the Billboard country music chart and becoming her third Top 10 hit. It was Smith's third single released under the RCA Victor label.

== Background and content ==
"I Can't Remember" was the third single written by Bill Anderson. This song, however, was co-written with his first wife, Bette Anderson. It was recorded in Nashville, Tennessee March 17, 1965 at RCA Victor's Studio B. The session was produced by Bob Ferguson (who also produced her three other singles) and was backed by Nashville's "A-Team" of musicians, which included Charlie McCoy on bass guitar, Hargus "Pig" Robbins on piano, and part of Anderson's touring band, The Po' Boys. The song's female narrator explains how her lover called her late at night explaining he must leave town. Although he had told her where he was going, the woman could not remember "but can't forget he's gone." The song's first chorus explains its storyline:

Did he say Sunday noon or one day soon
I think he left with Dan, but what if he said Ann
Did they go to meet a train or leave to catch a plane
I can't remember but I can't forget he's gone

Like her previous two singles released, "I Can't Remember" featured Smith performing the song's guitar accompaniment as well as singing lead vocals.

== Chart performance ==
"I Can't Remember" was released in April 1965, one month after its recording session, as her third single on RCA Victor Records. The song became Smith's third Top 10 hit in a row, peaking at #9 on the Billboard Magazine Hot Country Songs chart and also on the Bubbling Under Hot 100. It was issued on Smith's second RCA Victor album, Cute 'n' Country in October 1965 and was the only single from the album. The song was a series of singles written by Bill Anderson, who had written Smith's prior hits "Once a Day" and "Then and Only Then."

=== Charts ===
Chart (1965)	Peak position
U.S. Billboard Hot Country Songs	9
U.S. Billboard Bubbling Under Hot 100	30
