= Mark 8 =

- ← chapter 7 chapter 9 →
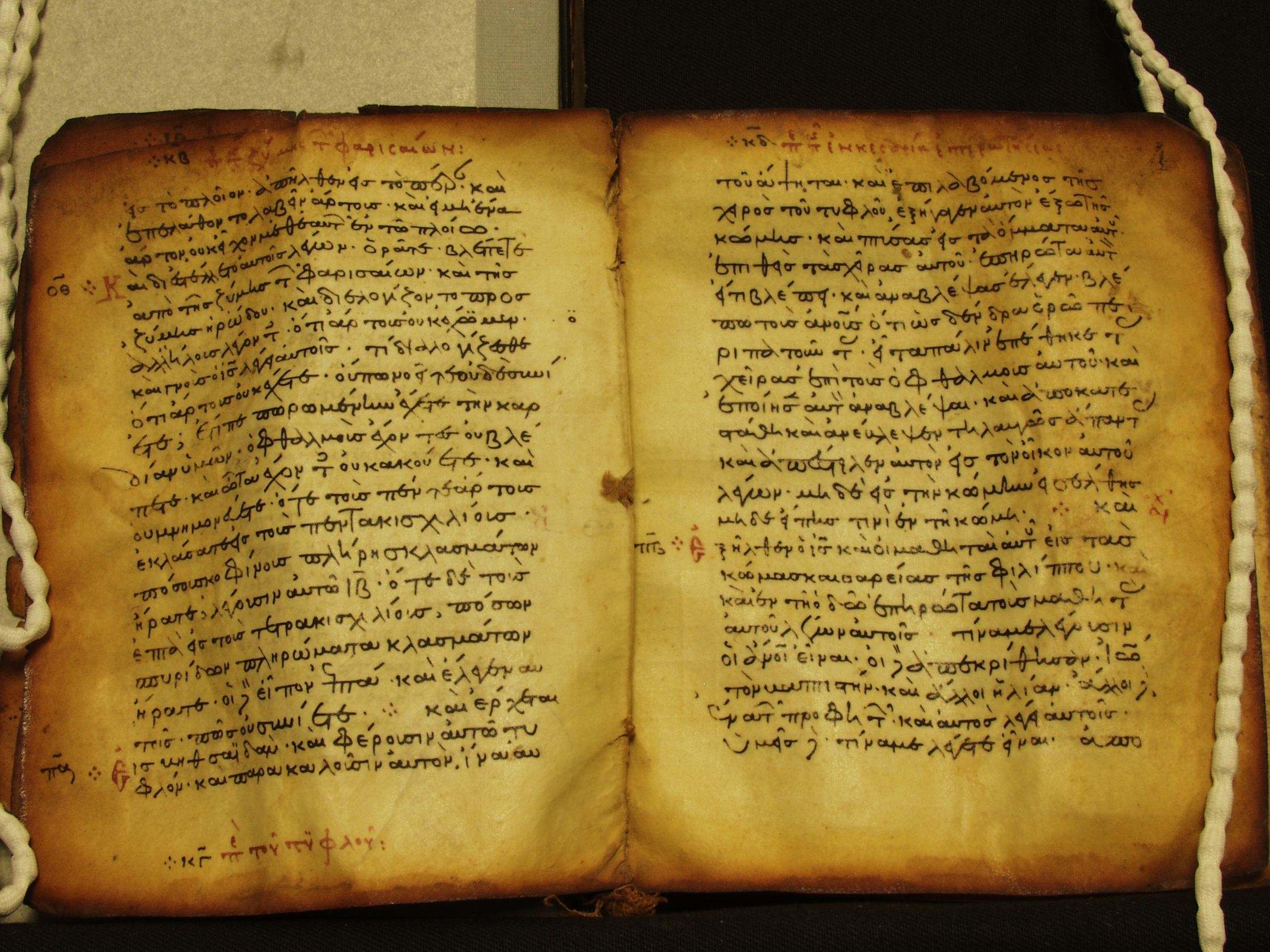
- The Greek text of Mark 8:13–29 in minuscule script on two pages of Minuscule 2445 from the 12th century
- Book: Gospel of Mark
- Category: Gospel
- Christian Bible part: New Testament
- Order in the Christian part: 2

Mark 8 is the eighth chapter of the Gospel of Mark in the New Testament of the Christian Bible. It contains two miracles of Jesus, Peter's confession that he believes Jesus is the Messiah, and Jesus' first prediction of his own death and resurrection. It is the middle chapter of the gospel but its significance is variously understood: for example the Jamieson-Fausset-Brown Bible Commentary calls it a "section of miscellaneous matter", whereas many commentators treat it as a turning point where Mark's description of Jesus as teacher and miracle worker gives way to his focus on the role of Jesus' death and the difficult nature of his teachings.

== Text ==
The original text was written in Koine Greek. This chapter is divided into 38 verses. There are 39 verses in the Douai-Rheims version. (Note: Mark 9:1 appears as Mark 8:39 in the Douai-Rheims version.)

=== Textual witnesses ===
Some early manuscripts containing the text of this chapter are:

- Codex Vaticanus (325–350; complete)
- Codex Sinaiticus (330–360; complete)
- Codex Bezae (~400; complete)
- Codex Alexandrinus (400–440; complete)
- Codex Ephraemi Rescriptus (~450; extant verses 6–38)

== Locations ==
The events recorded in this chapter take place in the Galilean wilderness and around the Sea of Galilee, at Dalmanutha, an unknown location sometimes thought to be in the vicinity of Magdala, Bethsaida, and the towns (Greek: τὰς κώμας, tas komas, also translated as "villages") around Caesarea Philippi. The latter location was 25–30 miles to the north of Bethsaida. Scottish Free Church minister William Robertson Nicoll suggests that Jesus' enquiry, "Who do people say that I am?", is asked "on the way to Caesarea Philippi, probably when the city ... came into view".

== Verse 1 ==
In those days, the multitude being very great and having nothing to eat, Jesus called His disciples to Him and said to them, ...

Mark also begins his account of Jesus' journey from Nazareth to the Jordan, to be baptised, with the words "in those days". The multitude is noted as being "very great again" (Greek: πάλιν, palin) in some versions, as the critical Westcott-Hort edition of Mark uses this word. However, the Textus Receptus has another word, Greek: παμπόλλου, pampollou, meaning "very many", which is not used elsewhere in the New Testament. Protestant theologian Heinrich Meyer suggests that "παμπόλλου ... might very easily have been changed into πάλιν πολλοῦ, as πάλιν was used in Mark so frequently", and therefore παμπόλλου is more likely to have been the original word. The New International Version speaks of "another large crowd", and similarly American pastor Nate Holdridge calls this group "a new crowd".

== The feeding of the 4,000 and the healing of the blind man at Bethsaida ==
Like Mark 6:30–44, verses 1–9 here recount Jesus feeding a large crowd with hardly any food at all. He is teaching a large and loyal crowd, "about four thousand men", in a remote place; they have been with him for three days, and everyone is hungry; they only have seven loaves of bread and an imprecise number of small fish. Jesus takes the bread, gives thanks to God, and breaks the bread, and the disciples then distribute it. The text in Greek uses the word εὐχαριστήσας, eucharistesas, to describe his actions. He also blesses the fish and commands that these be set before the crowd. To theologian John Gill, "it looks, by this account, as if the fishes were blessed, and brake, and distributed separately, alter [sic] the blessing, breaking, and distribution of the bread; and so the Syriac version renders it, 'upon whom also he blessed'; and the Persic thus, 'and he also blessed the fishes'". After everyone has eaten they fill seven baskets of leftover food. Matthew also records this in chapter 15:29–39 but neither Luke nor John have this, yet both record the preceding feeding of the 5000. Luke progresses straight from the feeding of the 5000 to Peter's confession. Skeptical scholars have concluded that this is just a doubling of the story in Mark 6 with only a few details changed, such as the number of loaves and baskets, although in the subsequent passage, Mark 8:19–21, Jesus refers to both events during a dialogue with his disciples about their lack of understanding.

They leave in a boat and go to Dalmanutha, which is listed in Matthew as Magadan and some early manuscripts of Mark as Magdala, home of Mary Magdalene. There Jesus encounters the Pharisees, who ask him to perform a miracle for them. "He sighed deeply in his spirit" (verse 12, cf. Mark 2:8), words not included in Matthew's account. Nicoll picks up "a sense of irreconcilable enmity, invincible unbelief, and coming doom" in the phrase. Jesus then asks, "Why does this generation ask for a miraculous sign? I tell you the truth, no sign will be given to it." Matthew and Luke say that only the Sign of Jonah will be given (Matthew 12:38–39, 16:1–4, Luke 11:29–30). See also Signs Gospel. They leave in a boat. On the other side of the lake, presumably the Sea of Galilee, they find they have only brought one loaf of bread. Jesus tells his disciples to be careful and to "watch out for the yeast of the Pharisees and that of Herod" (15), criticizing the Pharisees after his last encounter with them. His disciples think he is scolding them for not having enough bread, but Jesus instead scolds them for not understanding him:

Why are you talking about having no bread? Do you still not see or understand? Are your hearts hardened? Do you have eyes but fail to see, and ears but fail to hear? And don't you remember? When I broke the five loaves for the five thousand, how many basketfuls of pieces did you pick up?" "Twelve," they replied. "And when I broke the seven loaves for the four thousand, how many basketfuls of pieces did you pick up?" They answered, "Seven." He said to them, "Do you still not understand?" (Mark 8:17–21).

"Eyes which do not see, and ears which do not hear" recalls a similar expression in Ezekiel 12:2; the hardened hearts reflect the same expression in Mark 6:52.

Jesus does not explain any further, and they travel to Bethsaida, where they come upon a blind man. He puts spittle on the man's eyes and the man can partially see; then he touches his eyes again and he is totally healed. This miracle is only related in Mark.

This entire sequence, along with the preceding chapter, shows Jesus' work with gentiles. Jesus fed Jewish listeners in Mark 6 and he most probably feeds a gentile crowd here, although C. M. Tuckett argues that it is not certain that the crowd in chapter 8 is a gentile gathering. Jesus refuses to perform a miracle for the Pharisees, who ask for one, but performs miracles for the Gentiles, who do not. Jesus' enigmatic explaining of the meaning of the miracles and the disciples' confusion is contrasted with Jesus restoring a Gentile man's sight, perhaps symbolically showing Jesus' effort, and Mark's, to get his listeners to see what he is trying to tell them. Matthew unambiguously states in 16:12 that Jesus was saying stay away from the teachings of the Pharisees, yet in 23:1–3 Jesus says to do what the Pharisees say because of their authority but still labels them as hypocrites. "The scribes and the Pharisees sit in Moses' seat: All therefore whatsoever they bid you observe, that observe and do; but do not ye after their works: for they say, and do not."

The Jewish Encyclopedia article on Jesus argues that the Halakah ["Jewish Law"] was not in so definite a form at this period due to the disputes between those of Hillel the Elder and those of Shammai. The twelve of the first feeding might be a reference to the twelve tribes of Israel and the seven of the second feeding the seven pagan nations originally surrounding Israel. It is possible that Jesus was also using this to remind his disciples about the abundant care of God as shown by the contrast between the hunger of the disciples and the abundance of food left over after each of the miracles.

== Peter's confession and Jesus' prediction ==
Mark begins the second half of his book with Jesus and the disciples traveling to Caesarea Philippi. Jesus asks them who people think he is. John the Baptist or Elijah, they reply. Jesus asks them what they think. Peter declares that Jesus is "the Christ", the Anointed One. Jesus tells them to keep this a secret.

Jesus tells them that he must be persecuted by the priests and teachers and killed, and after three days rise again. Peter takes Jesus to one side and begins to rebuke him; Jesus turns back to look at his disciples and rebukes Peter in return (both verses 32 and 33 use the Greek: ἐπιτιμάω, epitimaó, "to rebuke"):

Get thee behind me, Satan: for thou savourest not the things that be of God, but the things that be of men.

Peter has just said that Jesus is the Anointed One and then Jesus tells him that he has to die, which Peter cannot believe.

== Instructions for followers ==
Mark then states that Jesus called a crowd to listen to him, which assumes they had arrived at the city, or it may show that Jesus' reply to Peter applies to everyone else, including the reader, as well. He says:

^{34}If anyone would come after me, he must deny himself and take up his cross and follow me. ^{35}For whoever wants to save his life (or soul) will lose it, but whoever loses his life for me and for the gospel will save it. ^{36}What good is it for a man to gain the whole world, yet forfeit his soul? ^{37}Or what can a man give in exchange for his soul? ^{38}If anyone is ashamed of me and my words in this adulterous and sinful generation, the Son of Man will be ashamed of him when he comes in his Father's glory with the holy angels. ^{9:1}And he said to them, "Truly I tell you, some who are standing here will not taste death before they see that the kingdom of God has come with power."

Mark 9:1 should be read with this section, according to Anglican biblical scholar Edward Plumptre, who states that the division between chapter 8 and chapter 9 "is obviously wrong".

Matthew has the same sequence of stories as this chapter in chapters 15 and 16.

== See also ==
- Bethsaida
- Dalmanutha
- Pharisees
- Saint Peter
- Other related Bible parts: Matthew 15, Matthew 16, Luke 9
- Take Up Thy Cross, The Saviour Said, based on Mark 8:34

== Notes ==
Preceded by Mark 7	Chapters of the Bible; Gospel of Mark	Succeeded by Mark 9
