= Tiny Blue Transistor Radio =

Single by Connie Smith

from the album Connie Smith
- A-side: "Then and Only Then"
- Released: January 1965
- Recorded: November 1964
- Studio: RCA Studio B, Nashville
- Genre: Country
- Length: 2:30
- Label: RCA Victor
- Songwriter: Bill Anderson
- Producer: Bob Ferguson

Connie Smith singles chronology
"Once a Day" (1964)	"Tiny Blue Transistor Radio" (1965)	"I Can't Remember" (1965)

"Tiny Blue Transistor Radio" is a song written by Bill Anderson that was originally recorded by American country music singer Connie Smith. It was released as the B-side to her 1965 single, "Then and Only Then". "Tiny Blue Transistor Radio" also became a charting country single, peaking within the top 40 of the national country survey in 1965.

== Background, release and chart performance ==
In 1964, Connie Smith broke through into the mainstream with the hit single "Once a Day". The song (penned by Bill Anderson) reached the top of the country music charts and spent eight weeks there before declining. Her follow-up singles would also prove successful, which would include "Tiny Blue Transistor Radio". It was also composed by Bill Anderson as well, and was originally intended to be recorded by Skeeter Davis. The song was recorded in November 1964 at RCA Studio B, located in Nashville, Tennessee. The session was produced by Bob Ferguson. Three additional sides were cut during the same recording session.

"Tiny Blue Transistor Radio" was originally released as the flip side to Smith's A-side single, "Then and Only Then". The single was released in January 1965 on RCA Victor Records. The A-side would become a top five country hit, while "Tiny Blue Transistor Radio" would reach the top 40. The song spent 17 weeks on the Billboard Hot Country Songs chart and peaked at number 25 in March 1965. The song was later released on Smith's debut self-titled album.

== Track listing ==
7" vinyl single

- "Then and Only Then" – 2:23
- "Tiny Blue Transistor Radio" – 2:30

== Charts ==
Chart (1965)	Peak position
US Hot Country Songs (Billboard)	25
