= Connie Smith (1965 album) =

Studio album by Connie Smith
- Released: March 1965
- Recorded: July – November 1964
- Studios: RCA Studio B, Nashville
- Genre: Country
- Length: 28:23
- Label: RCA Victor
- Producer: Bob Ferguson

Connie Smith chronology
Connie Smith (1965)	Cute 'n' Country (1965)

Singles from Connie Smith
- 1. "Once a Day" Released: August 1964; 2. "Then and Only Then/Tiny Blue Transistor Radio" Released: January 1965

Professional ratings
Review scores
Source	Rating
Allmusic	5/5 stars

Connie Smith is the debut studio album by American country music artist Connie Smith. It was released in March 1965 by RCA Victor and was produced by Bob Ferguson. The album included Smith's debut single, "Once a Day". The song became her signature recording and biggest hit, reaching number one on the Billboard country songs chart.

The album would also reach the top spot of the Top Country Albums chart in 1965, spending multiple weeks at the top of the chart.

== Background and content ==
Connie Smith rose to country music stardom with the 1964 song "Once a Day". Penned by Bill Anderson, the disc topped the country chart and prompted her record label to release her debut studio album. The album was recorded at RCA Studio B in Nashville, Tennessee. Sessions were held between July and November 1964. The production for the album was performed by Bob Ferguson. It featured the background vocalists, The Anita Kerr Singers. Six of the songs on the album were written by singer-songwriter, Bill Anderson, including "Once a Day" and "Then and Only Then." Also included was Smith's cover of Charlie Louvin's "I Don't Love You Anymore". Additionally, singer and songwriter Willie Nelson composed the album's track, "Darling, Are You Ever Coming Home".

== Release and reception ==
Smith's eponymous album was released in March 1965 on RCA Victor Records. It was the debut album in her career. It was issued as a vinyl LP album, with six tracks on each side of the record. Connie Smith peaked at number one on the Top Country Albums chart, spending 7 weeks on top of the albums chart, and 30 weeks overall. "Once a Day" was released in August 1964, and peaked at number one on November 28, spending eight weeks at the top spot. "Then and Only Then" was released as the follow-up single in early 1965, peaking within the Top 5 on the country charts. In addition, both songs also placed in the Bubbling Under Hot 100. A digital version of the original album was released in later years by Sony Music Entertainment.

The album was reviewed by AllMusic and received five out of five stars. Reviewer, Dan Cooper called Smith's voice to be, "blowing through the Nashville Sound production like a down-home Streisand fronting The Lennon Sisters." Slipcue.com reviewed the album and gave it a positive review, calling the sound, "Nashville Girl Group at its best." The songs "Once a Day," "Tiny Blue Transistor Radio," and "I Don't Love You Anymore" as "classic examples of the style." The website later concluded by stating, "Them folks at the label could make a lot of people really happy if they just reissued this album whole, as is, and let us hear what Smith sounded like coming out the gate. A doozy."

== Track listings ==
=== Original version ===
All tracks written by Bill Anderson, except where noted.

Side one
No.	Title	Writer(s)	Length
1.	"The Other Side of You"	William Broadwell Morgan	2:39
2.	"Tiny Blue Transistor Radio"		2:30
3.	"Once a Day"		2:17
4.	"Hinges on the Door"	Baker Knight	2:23
5.	"Don't Forget I Still Love You"	Guy Louis	2:02
6.	"Darling, Are You Ever Coming Home"	Hank Cochran; Willie Nelson	2:07

Side two
No.	Title	Writer(s)	Length
1.	"Then and Only Then"		2:23
2.	"The Threshold"		2:16
3.	"It's Just My Luck"	Betty Sue Perry	2:02
4.	"I'm Ashamed of You"		2:37
5.	"I Don't Love You Anymore"		2:35
6.	"Tell Another Lie"	Christian Bruhn; Randy Starr; Fred Wise	2:32

=== Digital version ===
Connie Smith (download and streaming)
No.	Title	Writer(s)	Length
1.	"The Other Side of You"	Morgan	2:43
2.	"Tiny Blue Transistor Radio"		2:33
3.	"Once a Day"		2:20
4.	"Hinges on the Door"	Knight	2:27
5.	"Don't Forget (I Still Love You)"	Louis	2:06
6.	"Darling, Are You Ever Coming Home"	Cochran; Nelson	2:11
7.	"Then and Only Then"		2:27
8.	"The Threshold"		2:21
9.	"It's Just My Luck"	Perry	2:06
10.	"I'm Ashamed of You"		2:41
11.	"I Don't Love You Anymore"		2:38
12.	"Tell Another Lie"	Bruhn; Starr; Wise	2:34

== Personnel ==
All credits are adapted from the liner notes of Connie Smith.

Musical personnel

- Harold Bradley – guitar
- Floyd Chance – bass
- Dorothy Dillard – background vocals
- Ray Edenton – guitar
- Dolores Edgin – background vocals
- Karl Garvin – background vocals
- Priscilla Hubbard – background vocals
- Jerry Kennedy – guitar
- Anita Kerr – background vocals
- Jimmy Lance – guitar
- Leonard Miller – drums
- Weldon Myrick – steel guitar
- Louis Nunley – background vocals
- Harold Ragsdale – background vocals
- Hargus "Pig" Robbins – piano
- Connie Smith - lead vocals, harmony vocals
- William Wright – background vocals

== Chart performance ==
Chart (1965)	Peak position
US Billboard 200	105
US Top Country Albums (Billboard)	1

== Release history ==
Region	Date	Format	Label	Ref.
Canada	March 1965	Vinyl	RCA Victor Records	
United Kingdom	March 1965	Vinyl	RCA Victor Records	
United States	March 1965	Vinyl	RCA Victor Records	
United States	2010s	Music download; streaming	Sony Music Entertainment	
