= Luther Brandon =

American guitarist

Luke Brandon (February 1, 1925 – February 15, 2012) was an American guitarist from Roane County, Tennessee. He played on several major records throughout his career as a guitarist. Noted artists that feature Brandon's guitar work are the Everly Brothers, Bobby Bare, Fats Domino, Frankie Avalon, and Sgt. Barry Sadler. Perhaps his career peak was a stint in Ohio at Fraternity Records fronting the house band known as "Luther Brandon and His All-American Boys Orchestra". He returned to East Tennessee where he worked at Ciderville Music in Powell and gigging locally.

Brandon died on February 15, 2012, at the age of 87.
