= Take Up Thy Cross, The Saviour Said =

- by Charles W. Everest
- Genre: Hymn
- Written: 1833
- Based on: Matthew 16:24
- Meter: 8.8.8.8
- Melody: "Breslau"; "Quebec" by Henry Baker

Jesus carrying the cross

"Take Up Thy Cross, The Saviour Said" is an American Christian hymn written by Charles W. Everest. It was originally a poem published in 1833 but was later altered to become a hymn. It was then edited by English hymnwriter Sir Henry Baker for inclusion in the Church of England's Hymns Ancient and Modern hymnal.

== History ==
"Take Up Thy Cross, The Saviour Said" was written by American clergyman Charles William Everest (1814–1877) and was included in the Episcopal Watchman magazine titled "Visions of Death" in 1833. It was published in the United Kingdom a year later in The Tract magazine. It was first published as a hymn in the Union Sabbath-School Hymns hymnal in 1835. This hymn version of the poem later went back to the United Kingdom where it was published with alterations in the Salisbury Hymn Book in 1857. "Take Up Thy Cross, The Saviour Said" was eventually included in the Church of England's Hymns Ancient and Modern, being one of only two American hymns to make it into the first edition of the hymnal in 1861 (the other was "Thou Art The Way" by George Washington Doane). During editing of "Hymns Ancient and Modern", the editor Henry Baker made a number of alterations and added an extra verse to the hymn before inclusion. As a result, a majority of Baker's alterations continued to be used as the hymn crossed denominations including into the Methodist Church's United Methodist Hymnal.

== Analysis ==
"Take Up Thy Cross, The Saviour Said" was written based upon Mark 8:34 where Jesus said "Whosoe'er will come after me, let him deny himself and take up his cross and follow me". It has been viewed as a "young man's hymn" because of vagueness in the wording. The hymn has commonly been used on Good Friday.

== Music ==
A widely used tune is Breslau, a 15th-century German folk melody. Felix Mendelssohn wrote a choral arrangement of the tune for his 1836 oratorio, St Paul, and this harmony, or simplified versions of it, are frequently used. Another commonly used tune is Quebec, also known as Quebec (Baker) and Hesperus, composed in 1854 by English engineer and composer Henry Baker (1835–1910; not to be confused with Sir Henry Baker).
