= Jesus predicts his betrayal =

Christian biblical narrative

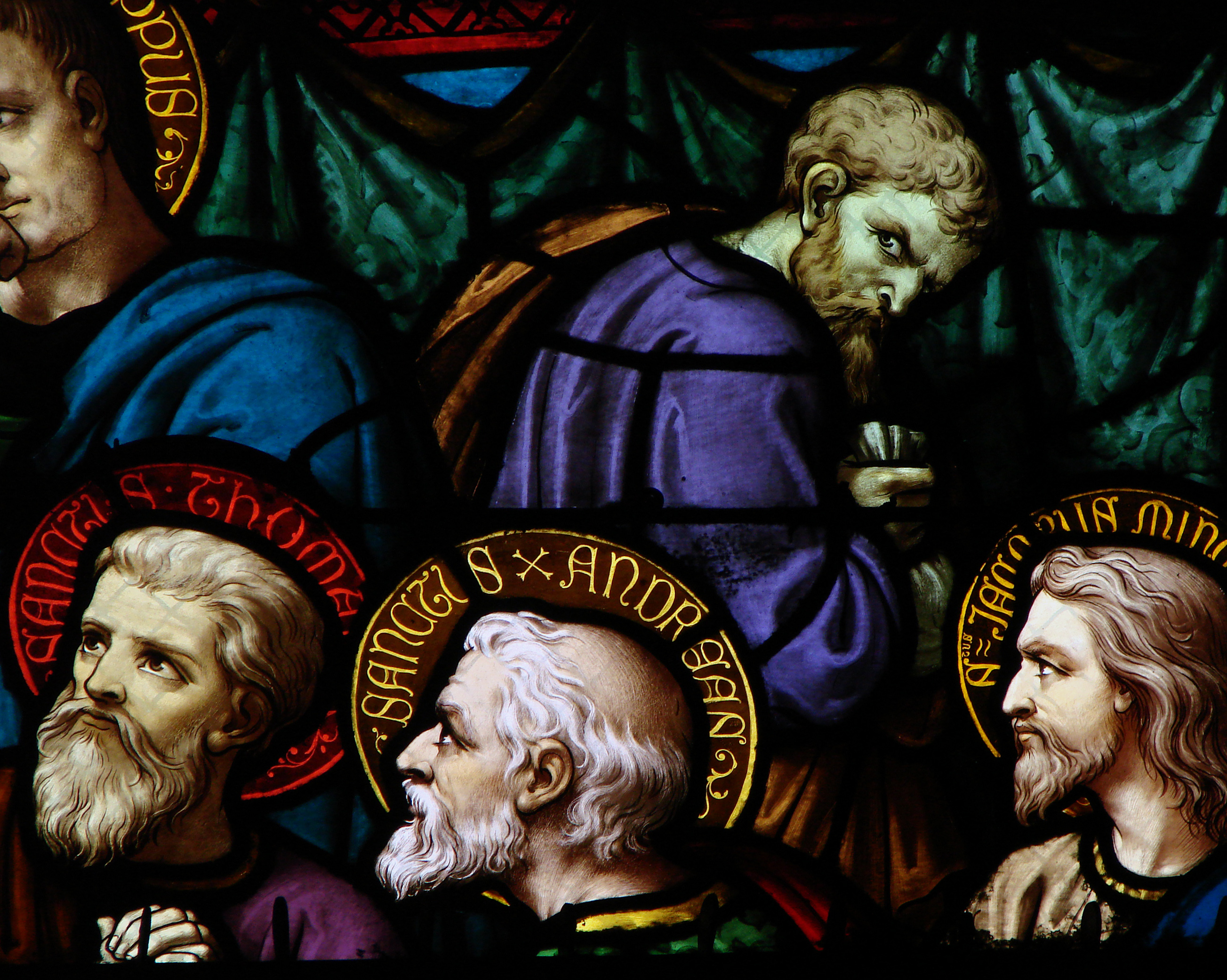
Detail of stained glass window depicting Judas Iscariot turning away from the Last Supper, Moulins Cathedral, France

Jesus predicts his betrayal three times in the New Testament, a narrative which is included in all four Canonical Gospels. This prediction takes place during the Last Supper in Matthew 26:24–25, Mark 14:18–21, Luke 22:21–23, and John 13:21–30.

Before that, in John 6:70, Jesus warns his disciples that one among them is "a devil". In the next verse, the author affirms that Jesus is talking about Judas Iscariot.

== Biblical narrative ==
In the Gospel of John, the prediction is preceded by the assertion in 13:17–18 that Jesus knew that Judas Iscariot would betray him: "If you know these things, blessed are you if you do them. I speak not of you all: I know whom I have chosen: but that the scripture may be fulfilled: He who eats my bread lifted up his heel against me." The blessing in John 13:17 is thus not directed at the Iscariot.

In Matthew 26:23–25, Jesus confirms the identity of the traitor:

"The Son of Man goes, even as it is written of him, but woe to that man through whom the Son of Man is betrayed! It would be better for that man if he had not been born." Judas, who betrayed him, answered: "It isn't me, is it, Rabbi?" He said to him: "You said it."

The attribution of the title Rabbi to Jesus by the Iscariot in this episode is unique to him, for one after another the other Apostles say "Surely it is not I, Lord", using the Lord (Kyrios) title. The Iscariot again calls Jesus Rabbi in Matthew 26:49 when he betrays him to the Sanhedrin in the Kiss of Judas episode.

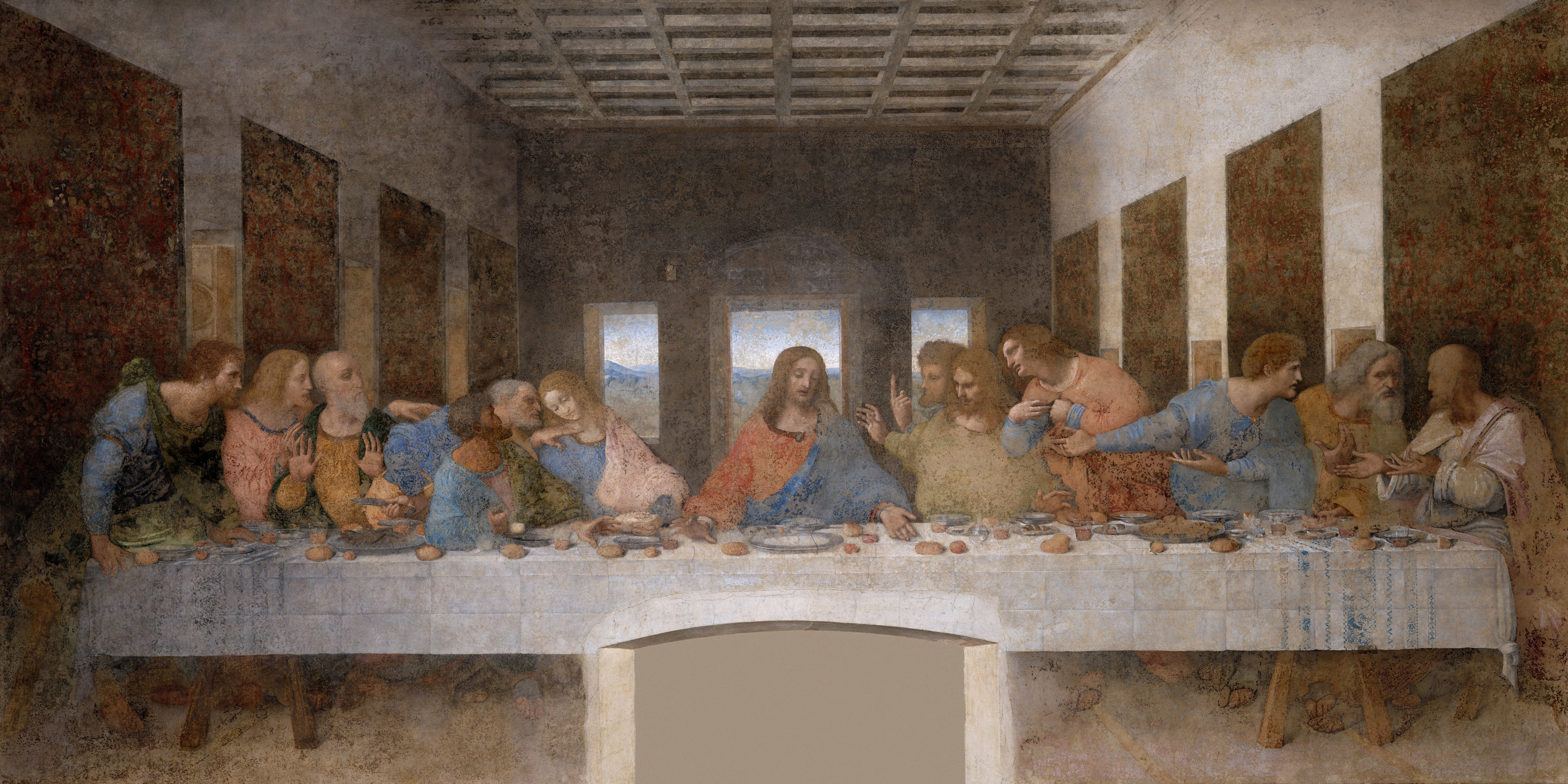
The Last Supper by Leonardo da Vinci

== In popular culture ==
Italian Renaissance artist Leonardo da Vinci's The Last Supper depicts the precise moment following Jesus's dinner prediction. According to art historian Helen Gardner, this artwork is the most reproduced religious painting of all time.

== See also ==
- Bargain of Judas
- Gospel harmony
- Jesus predicts his death
- Life of Jesus in the New Testament
- Thirty pieces of silver
