= Five Little Fingers =

Single by Bill Anderson

from the album Bill Anderson Sings
- B-side: "Easy Come – Easy Go"
- Released: December 1963
- Recorded: November 26, 1963
- Studio: Bradley Studios (Nashville, Tennessee)
- Genre: Country; Nashville Sound
- Length: 3:00
- Label: Decca
- Songwriter: Bill Anderson
- Producer: Owen Bradley

Bill Anderson singles chronology
"8×10" (1963)	"Five Little Fingers" (1963)	"Me" (1964)

"Five Little Fingers" is a song written and first recorded by American country singer-songwriter Bill Anderson. It was released as a single in 1963 via Decca Records and became a major hit.

== Background and release ==
"Five Little Fingers" was recorded on November 26, 1963, at the Bradley Studios, located in Nashville, Tennessee. The sessions were produced by Owen Bradley, who would serve as Anderson's producer through most of years with Decca Records. The single's B-side and its follow-up single was also recorded at the same session.

"Five Little Fingers" was released as a single by Decca Records in December 1963. It spent a total of 18 weeks on the Billboard Hot Country Singles chart before reaching number five in February 1964. "Five Little Fingers" was Anderson's seventh top ten hit on the country songs survey at the time of its release. It was later released on his 1964 studio album Bill Anderson Sings.

== Track listings ==
7" vinyl single

- "Five Little Fingers" – 3:00
- "Easy Come – Easy Go" – 2:08

== Chart performance ==
Chart (1963–64)	Peak position
US Hot Country Songs (Billboard)	5
US Bubbling Under Hot 100 (Billboard)	14
