= Still (Bill Anderson song) =

Single by Bill Anderson

from the album Still
- B-side: "You Made It Easy"
- Released: January 28, 1963
- Genre: Country
- Length: 2:51
- Label: Decca
- Songwriter: Bill Anderson
- Producer: Owen Bradley

Bill Anderson singles chronology
"Mama Sang a Song" (1962)	"Still" (1963)	"8×10" (1963)

"Still" is a 1963 country music single by Bill Anderson. "Still" was Anderson's second number one on the country chart, staying at the top spot for seven non-consecutive weeks. The song crossed over to the pop chart, peaking at number eight. Anderson performed this song on the finale of the 1977-1978 ABC game show The Better Sex which he co-hosted with Sarah Purcell.

This song is mostly spoken in the two verses, rather than sung, except for the repeated refrains, that are done with a female chorus. The narrator misses his girl, since she went away, and hopes to have her back again someday soon, saying that he is still here.

== Chart performance ==
Chart (1963)	Peak position
Australia	32
Canada (CHUM Hit Parade)	23
New Zealand (Lever Hit Parade)	8
U.S. Billboard Hot Country Singles	1
U.S. Billboard Hot 100	8
U.S. Billboard Easy Listening	3

== Other recordings ==
- 1963 Al Martino included in his album I Love You Because.
- 1963 Bing Crosby for his album Bing Crosby Sings the Great Country Hits.
- 1963 Karl Denver - this spent 13 weeks in the UK charts peaking at No. 15.
- 1963 Ken Dodd - this spent ten weeks in the UK charts peaking at No. 35.
