= Get behind me, Satan =

Words said by Jesus in the New Testament

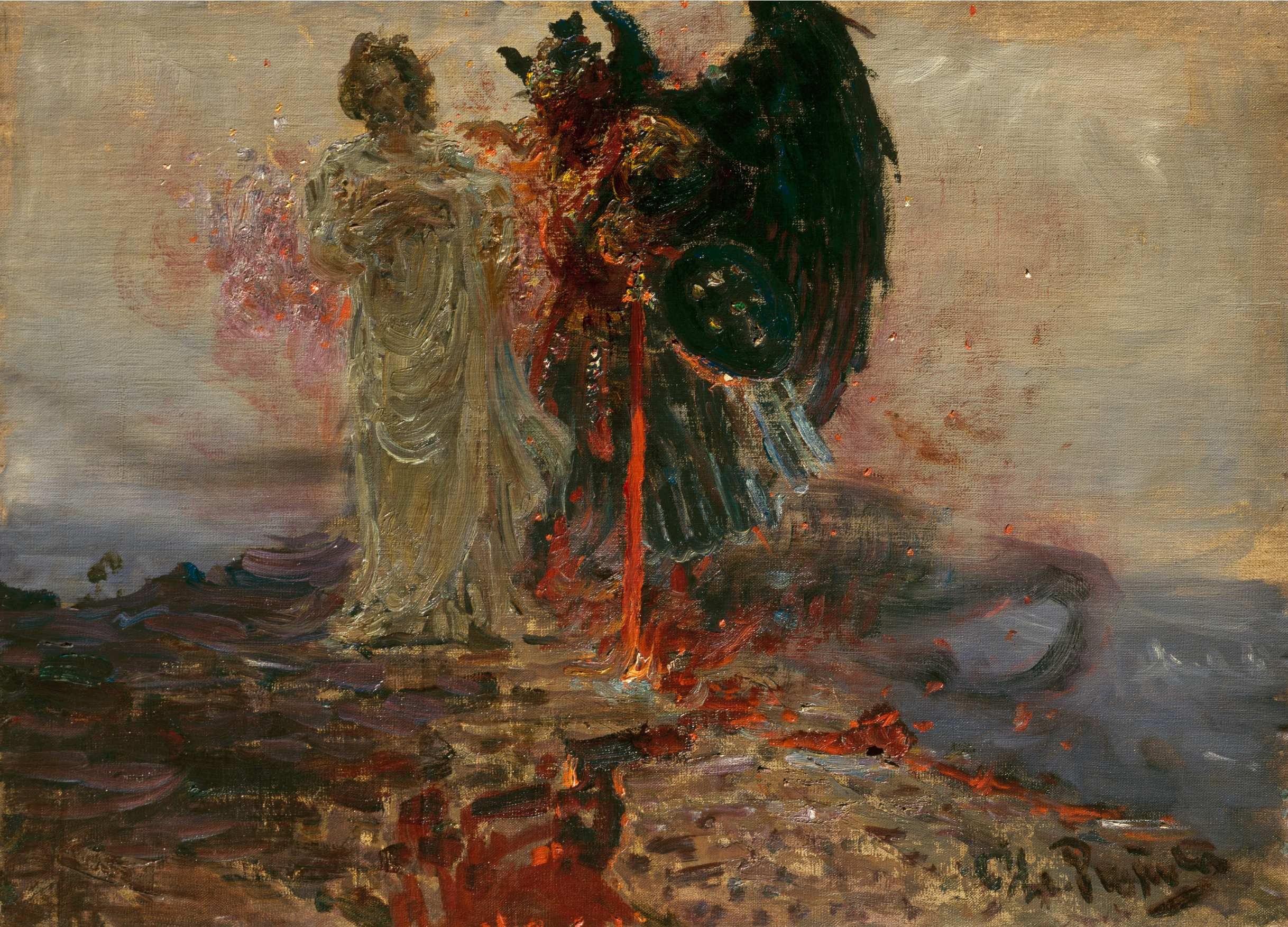
Get Thee Behind Me, Satan by Ilya Repin; 1895, oil on canvas, 46 × 62 cm, Russian Museum.

"Get behind me, Satan", or "Go away, Satan", and in older translations such as the King James Version "Get thee behind me, Satan", is a saying of Jesus in the New Testament. It is first attested in Mark 8:33, where Jesus is addressing Peter; this is retold in Matthew 16:23 (Greek: Ὕπαγε ὀπίσω μου, Σατανᾶ, Hypage opisō mou, Satana). In the temptation of Jesus, in Matthew 4 and Luke 4:8, Jesus rebukes "the tempter" (Greek: ὁ πειραζῶν, ho peirazōn) or "the devil" (Greek: ὁ διάβολος, ho diabolos) with the same phrase.

== See also ==
- Vade retro satana
