= Bill Anderson Sings =

Studio album by Bill Anderson
- Released: February 1964
- Recorded: 1960–1963
- Studios: Bradley Studios (Nashville, Tennessee); Columbia (Nashville, Tennessee)
- Genres: Country; Nashville Sound
- Label: Decca
- Producer: Owen Bradley

Bill Anderson chronology
Still (1963)	Bill Anderson Sings (1964)	Showcase (1964)

Singles from Bill Anderson Sings
- 1. "8×10" Released: August 1963; 2. "Five Little Fingers/Easy Come – Easy Go" Released: December 1963

Bill Anderson Sings is a studio album by American country singer-songwriter Bill Anderson. It was released in February 1964 on Decca Records and was produced by Owen Bradley. The album was Anderson's second studio release as a recording artist and included two singles that became major hits on the Billboard country chart. The album itself would also reach positions on the Billboard charts following its release.

== Background and content ==
Bill Anderson Sings was recorded between 1960 and 1963 at Bradley Studios in Nashville, Tennessee, which changed ownership and were renamed Columbia Recording Studios during the album's recording. All sessions were produced by Owen Bradley, who also collaborated with Anderson for his previous studio album, among other recordings. The album consisted of 12 tracks. Five of the record's songs were written or co-written by Anderson. Some recordings were remakes of originals recorded by other artists. The second track, "Abilene", was first recorded by George Hamilton IV. The third track, "I'm Leaving It Up to You", was originally cut by the duo Dale & Grace. Additionally, the seventh track, "500 Miles Away from Home", was recorded at the time by Bobby Bare.

== Release and chart performance ==
Bill Anderson Sings was officially released in February 1964 and was his second studio album for the Decca label. It was issued as a vinyl record, containing six songs on each side of the record. Upon its release, the album peaked at number 7 in April 1964 on the Billboard Top Country Albums chart. It became Anderson's second album to place on this chart. Bill Anderson Sings also included two singles that were released in 1963. The first single, "8x10", was released in August 1963 and peaked at number 2 on the Billboard Hot Country Singles chart. The single also became Anderson's third single to place on the Billboard Hot 100, peaking at number 53 in September. Also that September, the single reached number 18 on the adult contemporary chart. The second single issued was "Five Little Fingers" was released in December 1963. The song also became a major hit, reaching number 5 on the country chart in February 1964. Additionally, the single's B-side charted on the same Billboard country chart, peaking at number 15 in May 1964.

== Track listing ==
Side one
No.	Title	Writer(s)	Length
1.	"Easy Come – Easy Go"	Bill Anderson	2:03
2.	"Abilene"	Bob Gibson; John D. Loudermilk	2:10
3.	"I'm Leaving It Up to You"	Don F. Harris; Dewey Terry	2:12
4.	"Green, Green"	Randy Sparks; Barry McGuire	2:09
5.	"Five Little Fingers"	Anderson	3:00
6.	"Take Me Home"	Jack Clement; Allen Reynolds	2:28

Side two
No.	Title	Writer(s)	Length
1.	"8×10"	Anderson; Walter Haynes	2:48
2.	"500 Miles Away from Home"	Bobby Bare; Charlie Williams	2:42
3.	"You Don't Have to Be a Baby to Cry"	Bob Merrill; Terry Shand	2:04
4.	"Candy Apple Red"	Houston Turner	3:02
5.	"The Best of Strangers"	Anderson; Buddy Killen	1:57
6.	"One Mile Over, Two Miles Back"	Anderson	2:17

== Personnel ==
All credits are adapted from the liner notes of Bill Anderson Sings.

Musical personnel

- Bill Anderson – lead vocals
- Brenton Banks – strings
- Harold Bradley – guitar
- George Brinkley – strings
- Cecil Brower – strings
- Howard Carpenter – strings
- Floyd Cramer – piano
- Pete Drake – steel guitar
- Ray Edenton – guitar
- Sofie Fott – strings
- Hank Garland – guitar
- Michael Gattozzi – strings
- Buddy Harman – drums

- Lillian Hunt – strings
- Bob Johnson – banjo
- The Jordanaires – background vocals
- Jerry Kennedy – guitar
- The Anita Kerr Singers – background vocals
- Douglas Kirkham – drums
- Grady Martin – guitar
- Bill McElhiney – trumpet
- Bob Moore – bass
- Hargus "Pig" Robbins – piano
- Joe Zinkan – bass

Technical personnel

- Owen Bradley – record producer

== Chart performance ==
Chart (1964)	Peak position
US Top Country Albums (Billboard)	7

== Release history ==
Region	Date	Format	Label	Ref.
United States	February 1964	Vinyl	Decca	
