= 8×10 (song) =

Single by Bill Anderson

from the album Bill Anderson Sings
- B-side: "One Mile Over - Two Miles Back"
- Released: August 1963
- Recorded: July 1, 1963
- Studio: Bradley Studios (Nashville, Tennessee)
- Genre: Country; Nashville Sound
- Length: 2:48
- Label: Decca
- Songwriters: Bill Anderson; Walter Haynes
- Producer: Owen Bradley

Bill Anderson singles chronology
| "Still" (1963) | "8×10" (1963) | "Five Little Fingers" (1963) |

"8×10" is a song written by Bill Anderson and Walter Haynes. It was first recorded by American country singer-songwriter Bill Anderson. It was released as a single in 1963 via Decca Records and became a major hit.

== Background and release ==
"8×10" was recorded on July 1, 1963, at Bradley Studios, located in Nashville, Tennessee. The sessions were produced by Owen Bradley, who would serve as Anderson's producer through most of years with Decca Records.

"8×10" was released as a single by Decca Records in August 1963. The single spent 23 weeks on the Billboard Hot Country Singles chart, peaking at number two in October 1963. It was Anderson's third single to place on the Billboard Hot 100, reaching number 53 around the same time frame. "8x10" was also his second (and final) single release to chart on the Billboard Adult Contemporary chart, where it reached number 18 in September 1963. It was later released on his 1964 studio album Bill Anderson Sings.

== Track listings ==
7" vinyl single

- "8x10" – 2:48
- "One Mile Over - Two Miles Back" – 2:17

== Chart performance ==
| Chart (1963) | Peak position |
|---|---|
| US Adult Contemporary (Billboard) | 18 |
| US Billboard Hot 100 | 53 |
| US Hot Country Songs (Billboard) | 2 |
