= Then and Only Then =

- German release picture sleeve

Single by Connie Smith

from the album Connie Smith
- B-side: "Tiny Blue Transistor Radio"
- Released: January 1965
- Recorded: November 18, 1964
- Studio: RCA Studio B, Nashville
- Genre: Country; Nashville sound
- Length: 2:25
- Label: RCA Victor
- Songwriter: Bill Anderson
- Producer: Bob Ferguson

Connie Smith singles chronology
"Once a Day" (1964)	"Then and Only Then" (1965)	"I Can't Remember" (1965)

"Then and Only Then" is a song written by Bill Anderson and recorded by the American country artist, Connie Smith, on her Connie Smith album. It was produced by Bob Ferguson and released in January 1965, reaching the Top 5 on the Billboard country music chart in early 1965, becoming her second major hit. It was her follow-up single to her multi-week number one hit, "Once a Day", which was released the previous year.

== Background and content ==
"Then and Only Then" was one of a series of hit songs written by Anderson for Smith. (Others included "Nobody But a Fool (Would Love You)" and "Cincinnati, Ohio".)

It was recorded at RCA Victor Records' Studio B in Nashville, Tennessee, on November 18, 1964. Produced by Ferguson, the session featured Nashville's "A-Team" of musicians, including members of Anderson's backing band, The Po' Boys. The storyline of "Then and Only Then" describes how a woman's lover has temporarily left her, saying that he will return. The female narrator forgets when he will be returning and says that when he returns, "then and only then" she will stop crying. The song's chorus further explains the storyline:

For then and only then will I stop cryin'
And this achin', breakin' heart of mine will mend
Not until I feel your arms around me
Will I be happy and I live for then and only then

In the song's original recording, Smith is featured not only singing the lead vocals, but also playing the guitar accompaniment, as she did for her previous single.

"Then and Only Then" has since been recorded by the American country singer, Loretta Lynn, for her 1965 studio album, Blue Kentucky Girl.

== Chart performance ==
"Then and Only Then" was Smith's second single released on RCA Victor Records. The song was issued to radio in January 1965, becoming a major hit shortly thereafter, reaching #4 on the Billboard Hot Country Songs chart, while peaking outside the Billboard Top Pop 100, reaching #116. The B-side, "Tiny Blue Transistor Radio", also charted the country music list, peaking at #25 during the same time.

=== Charts ===
Chart (1965)	Peak position
U.S. Billboard Hot Country Songs	4
U.S. Billboard Bubbling Under Hot 100	16
