= Mama Sang a Song =

Single by Bill Anderson

from the album Bill Anderson Sings Country Heart Songs
- B-side: "On And On And On"
- Released: July 1962
- Recorded: June 5, 1961
- Studio: Bradley Studios (Nashville, Tennessee)
- Genre: Country
- Length: 3:26
- Label: Decca Records
- Songwriter: Bill Anderson
- Producer: Owen Bradley

Bill Anderson singles chronology
| "Get a Little Dirt on Your Hands" (1962) | "Mama Sang a Song" (1962) | "Still" (1963) |

"Mama Sang a Song" is a country music song written and recorded by Bill Anderson.

Released in 1962, this recitation — prominently featuring a backing choir singing Christian hymns — was Bill Anderson's first No. 1 hit on the Billboard Hot C&W Sides chart that fall. The song spent seven non-consecutive weeks atop the chart, spanning from October 27 through December 22, and 27 weeks total in the country chart's top 40 from the summer of 1962 through early 1963.

== Background ==
"Mama Sang a Song" is a sentimental reminiscence of a sharecropper's childhood, specifically about his mother. The protagonist recalls that, although his family grew up dirt poor and that his father sometimes cried in frustration over being unable to afford better things for his children, love, patience and virtue always reigned in their household. The youngster felt particular comfort when, in times of trial and yearning, his mother would take a hymnal from the shelf and sing a song to comfort the family and affirm their strong Christian faith.

Many nights, the family would go to sleep hearing the mother sing "What a Friend We Have in Jesus," and awaken to "Rock of Ages." The protagonist's father would then remove the Bible from the shelf and read before requesting his wife to sing another song.

Time then begins to shift, when the protagonist's older siblings (a sister only referred to as "Sister," then brothers Bob, Tommy and Dan) leave home and his father begins developing physical ailments that render him unable to work; the main character now has to be his mother's "little man" and do most of the work. Despite these new and continued hardships, the family's Christian faith remains strong.

The scene then turns to the present, where the protagonist is now a young man who has since left home and gotten a better life. He muses that he doesn't get to return to his childhood home anymore; he thinks the house is still standing, if not surely abandoned. He then reveals that his mother has since died, and that her voice now sings in Heaven, "around God's golden throne." He then ties up the song by sharing his belief that the world is a better place because "one time, my mama sang a song."

Throughout the song, the choir backs the recitation with several bars each of "What a Friend We Have in Jesus" and "Rock of Ages."

== Chart performance ==
| Chart (1962) | Peak position |
|---|---|
| U.S. Billboard Hot Country Singles | 1 |
| U.S. Billboard Hot 100 | 89 |
| Canada | 26 |

== Cover versions ==
Several country and popular performers recorded their own versions of "Mama Sang a Song," including:

- Stan Kenton (U.S. Billboard Hot 100 #32, 1962)
- Walter Brennan (U.S. Billboard Hot 100 #38, AC #14, 1962); at age 68, Brennan became the oldest living person with a Top 40 hit (he was surpassed by 75-year-old Moms Mabley in 1969)
- Jimmy Dean.
- Faron Young.
- Irish singer Crawford Bell also recorded a version of the song.
