= Cincinnati, Ohio (song) =

Single by Connie Smith

from the album Connie Smith Sings Bill Anderson
- B-side: "Don't Feel Sorry for Me"
- Released: June 1967
- Recorded: October 28, 1966
- Studio: RCA Victor Studio, Nashville, Tennessee
- Genre: Country
- Length: 2:10
- Label: RCA Victor
- Songwriter: Bill Anderson
- Producer: Chet Atkins

Connie Smith singles chronology
"I'll Come Runnin'" (1967)	"Cincinnati, Ohio" (1967)	"Burning a Hole in My Mind" (1967)

"Cincinnati, Ohio" is a song written and released by Bill Anderson and later covered by Connie Smith in 1967.

The song, composed and originally recorded by Anderson in 1964, told of a tired woman attempting to move from Louisville, Kentucky, to her hometown of Cincinnati, Ohio. The song rose to #4 on the country charts, becoming one of her many top ten hits she had in the 1960s, and also becoming one of her signature songs.

A cover version exists, done by the Osborne Brothers from the 1990 release "Hillbilly Fever".

During the 7th innings at Cincinnati Reds home games Smith's version is played, with the words across the stadium screens.

== Chart performance ==
Chart (1967)	Peak position
U.S. Billboard Hot Country Singles	4
