= Christopher M. Tuckett =

British New Testament scholar

Christopher Mark Tuckett
- Born: 1948 (age 77–78)
- Citizenship: British
- Awards: Burkitt Medal (2012)

Academic background
- Education: University of Lancaster
- Doctoral advisor: David R. Catchpole

Academic work
- Discipline: Theology
- Sub-discipline: New Testament; Early Christianity
- Institutions: Queens' College, Cambridge; Victoria University of Manchester; University of Oxford; Pembroke College, Oxford

Christopher Mark Tuckett is a British biblical scholar and Anglican priest. He holds the Title of Distinction of professor of New Testament studies at the University of Oxford and is a fellow of Pembroke College, Oxford.

== Early life ==
Tuckett finished the Cambridge Mathematical Tripos (with first class honours in both parts 1 and 2) at Queens' College, Cambridge, and then took first class honours in both parts of the Cambridge Theology Tripos.

== Career ==
Tuckett was ordained a deacon in the Church of England in 1975 and priest a year later. He served for two years as assistant curate at the Priory Church in Lancaster, followed by two years as Chaplain and Bye-Fellow back at Queens'. Here he was awarded his doctoral degree for his dissertation "The Revival of the Griesbach Hypothesis: Analysis and Appraisal". The Griesbach hypothesis relates to the origins of the synoptic gospels.

He was then lecturer in New Testament studies at the Victoria University of Manchester from 1979 until 1991 and Rylands Professor of Biblical Criticism and Exegesis until 1996. At Manchester, Tuckett served as dean of the faculty and head of the newly formed Department of Religions and Theology. From Manchester, he moved to the University of Oxford, where he was lecturer in New Testament studies until 2001 before being awarded the Title of Distinction of professor of New Testament studies. He taught at Oxford from 1996 to 2013.

Tuckett was the president of the Studiorum Novi Testamenti Societas (SNTS), from 2013 to 2014.

== Honours ==
- 2011: New Studies in the Synoptic Problem, Oxford Conference, April 2008: Essays in Honour of Christopher M. Tuckett. Leuven: Peeters
- 2012: Burkitt Medal by the British Academy 'in recognition of special service to Biblical Studies'.

== Works ==
=== Books ===
- Tuckett, Christopher M. (1983). The Messianic secret. Issues in Religion and Theology. Vol. 1. London: SPCK. ISBN 9780800617677. OCLC 9392300.
- ——— (1983). The Revival of the Griesbach Hypothesis: an analysis and appraisal. Society for New Testament Studies - Monography Series. Vol. 44. Cambridge: Cambridge University Press. ISBN 9780521238038. OCLC 7464607.
- ——— (1986). Riches, John Kenneth (ed.). Nag Hammadi and the Gospel Tradition: synoptic tradition in the Nag Hammadi library. Studies of the New Testament and its World. Edinburgh: T&T Clark. ISBN 9780567093646. OCLC 15714162.
- ——— (1987). Reading the New Testament: methods of interpretation. London: SPCK. ISBN 9780281042593. OCLC 850818173.
- ——— (1996). Q and the History of Early Christianity: studies on Q. Edinburgh: T&T Clark. ISBN 9780567085849. OCLC 845490530.
- ——— (1996). Luke. New Testament Guides. Sheffield, England: Sheffield Academic Press. ISBN 9781850757511. OCLC 34787394.
- ——— (2001). Christology and the New Testament: Jesus and His earliest followers. Edinburgh: Edinburgh University Press. ISBN 9780748608690. OCLC 464067743.
- ——— (2007). The Gospel of Mary. Oxford Early Christian Gospel Texts. Oxford: Oxford University Press. ISBN 9780191549731. OCLC 181737962.

=== Chapters ===
- Mark in Barton, J. and Muddiman, J. (2001), The Oxford Bible Commentary.

=== As editor ===
- ———, ed. (1984). Synoptic Studies: the Ampleforth conferences of 1982 and 1983. Journal for the study of the New Testament - Supplement series. Vol. 7. Sheffield, England: JSOT Press. ISBN 9780567250513. OCLC 747544392.
- ———, ed. (1995). Luke's literary achievement: collected essays. Journal for the study of the New Testament - Supplement series. Vol. 116. Sheffield, England: Sheffield Academic Press. ISBN 9780567501073. OCLC 747260223.
- ———; Rowland, Christopher, eds. (2006). The Nature of New Testament Theology: essays in honour of Robert Morgan. Oxford: Blackwell. ISBN 9781405111751. OCLC 60741978.
- ———, ed. (2012). 2 Clement: Introduction, Text, and Commentary. Oxford: Oxford University Press. ISBN 9780199694600.

=== Journal articles ===
- ——— (December 1983). "1 Corinthians and Q". Journal of Biblical Literature. 102 (4): 607–619. doi:10.2307/3260868. JSTOR 3260868.
- ——— (April 1984). "Synoptic tradition in the Gospel of Truth and the Testimony of Truth". Journal of Theological Studies. New Series. 35 (1): 131–145. doi:10.1093/jts/35.1.131.
- ——— (October 1989). "Q, prayer, and the kingdom". Journal of Theological Studies. New Series. 40 (2): 367–376. doi:10.1093/jts/40.2.367.
