= Connie Smith singles discography =

Connie Smith discography
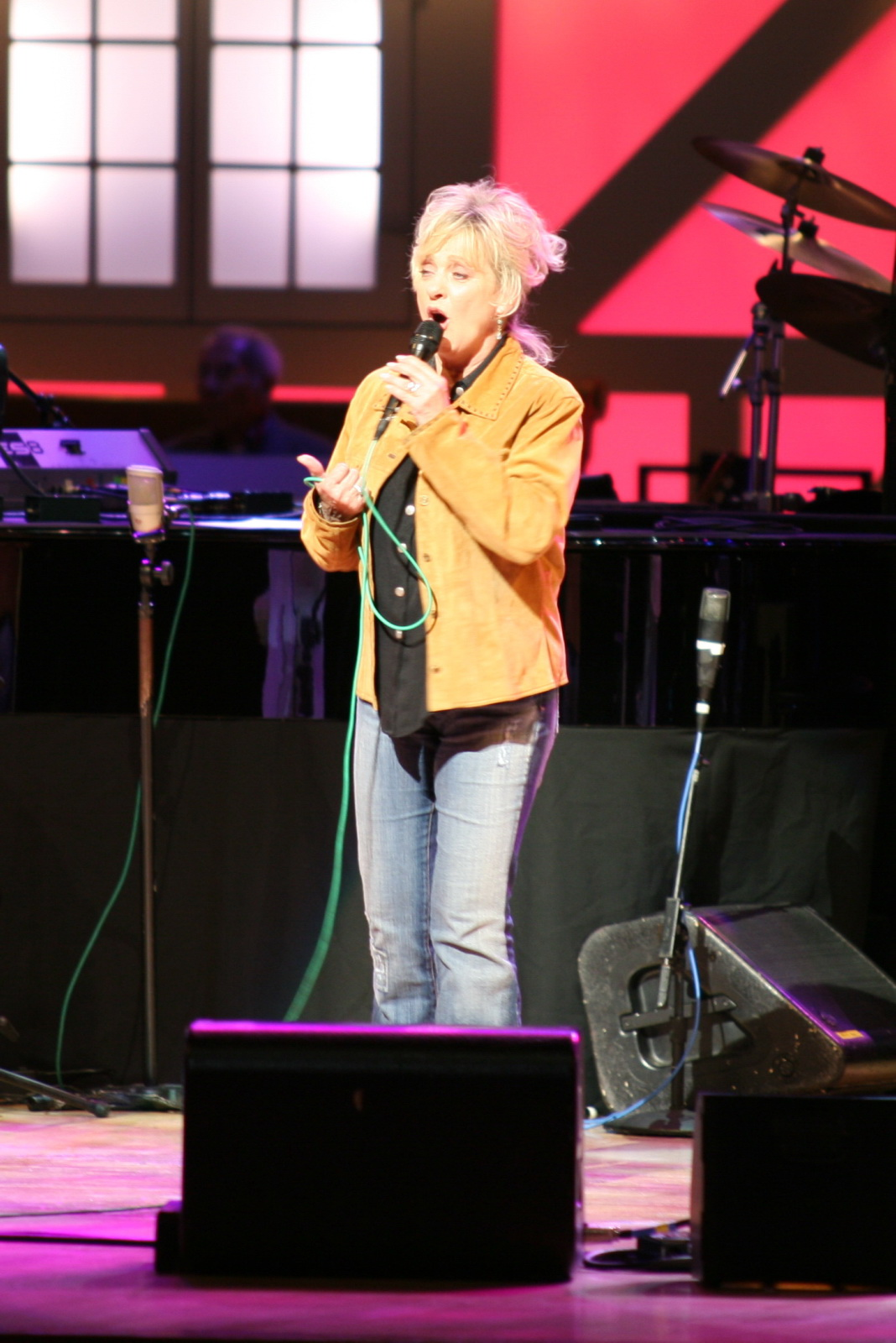
- Connie Smith performing at the Grand Ole Opry (2007).
- Singles: 48
- Music videos: 1
- Other charted songs: 1

The singles discography of Connie Smith, an American country artist, consists of 48 singles, one music video and one additional charting song. After signing with RCA Victor Records in 1964, Smith released her debut single in August entitled "Once a Day". The song topped the Billboard Magazine Hot Country Singles chart by November and held the position for eight weeks, for many years being the longest running song at number one by a female country artist. The single's success launched Smith into stardom, making Smith one of the decade's most successful female artists. The follow-up single, "Then and Only Then", reached number 4 on the country singles chart, while its flip side ("Tiny Blue Transistor Radio") went to number 25 on the same chart. All of Smith's singles released between 1965 and 1968 reached the top 10 on the Billboard country songs chart, including "If I Talk to Him", "Ain't Had No Lovin'", and "Cincinnati, Ohio". By 1969, Smith felt highly pressured by her career and cut back on promoting singles. Smith's chart success slightly declined because of this, with songs like "Ribbon of Darkness" (1969) and "Louisiana Man" (1970) only reaching the top 20. Other singles continued to peak within the top 10, including "I Never Once Stopped Loving You" (1970) and "Just One Time" (1971).

In 1972, all three of Smith's singles reached the top 10 on the Billboard Hot Country Singles chart: "Just for What I Am" (number 5), "If It Ain't Love (Let's Leave It Alone)" (number 7), and "Love Is the Look You're Looking for" (number 8). After signing with Columbia Records in 1973, Smith incorporated more Gospel music into her albums, and her chart success declined slightly. Many of her singles continued to remain in the top 20, including "Ain't Love a Good Thing" (1973) and "I Never Knew (What That Song Meant Before)" (1974). The following year Smith released a cover version of Hank Williams' "Why Don't You Love Me" (number 15) and in 1976 covered The Everly Brothers' "(Till) I Kissed You" (number 10). In 1977, Smith signed with Monument Records, which updated her to a country pop-focused sound. In 1978, her cover of Andy Gibb's number one single "I Just Want to Be Your Everything" became Smith's only single to become a major hit under Monument, reaching number 14 on the Billboard country singles list. The remainder of her singles reached progressively-lower positions on the country chart, and in 1979, Smith left Monument. In 1985 Smith returned on Epic Records with the single "A Far Cry from You", which peaked at number 71 and became her final chart appearance.

== Singles ==
=== As lead artist ===
List of singles, with selected chart positions, showing other relevant details
Title	Year	Peak chart positions			Album
Title	Year	US Bub.	US Cou.	CAN Cou.	Album
"Once a Day"	1964	1	1	—	Connie Smith
"Then and Only Then"	1965	16	4	—	Connie Smith
"I Can't Remember"	1965	30	9	—	Cute 'n' Country
"If I Talk to Him"	1965	—	4	—	Miss Smith Goes to Nashville
"Nobody But a Fool (Would Love You)"	1966	—	4	—	Miss Smith Goes to Nashville
"Ain't Had No Lovin'"	1966	—	2	—	Born to Sing
"The Hurtin's All Over"	1966	—	3	—	Downtown Country
"Pas Souvent" (Note: "Pas Souvent" was released as a single in France only.)	1966	—	—	—	Non-album single
"I'll Come Runnin'"	1967	—	10	—	The Best of Connie Smith
"Cincinnati, Ohio"	1967	—	4	—	Connie Smith Sings Bill Anderson
"Burning a Hole in My Mind"	1967	—	5	—	I Love Charley Brown
"Baby's Back Again"	1967	—	7	7	I Love Charley Brown
"Run Away Little Tears"	1968	—	10	—	I Love Charley Brown
"Cry, Cry, Cry"	1968	—	20	—	Connie in the Country
"Ribbon of Darkness"	1969	—	13	1	Connie's Country
"You and Your Sweet Love"	1969	—	6	—	The Best of Connie Smith Volume II
"I Never Once Stopped Loving You"	1970	—	5	17	I Never Once Stopped Loving You
"Louisiana Man"	1970	—	14	—	I Never Once Stopped Loving You
"Where Is My Castle"	1970	—	11	20	Where Is My Castle
"Just One Time"	1971	19	2	2	Just One Time
"I'm Sorry If My Love Got in Your Way"	1971	—	14	—	Non-album single
"Just for What I Am"	1972	—	5	4	Ain't We Havin' Us a Good Time
"If It Ain't Love (Let's Leave It Alone)"	1972	—	7	14	If It Ain't Love and Other Great Dallas Frazier Songs
"Love Is the Look You're Looking For"	1972	—	8	6	Love Is the Look You're Looking For
"You've Got Me (Right Where You Want Me)"	1973	—	21	—	A Lady Named Smith
"Dream Painter"	1973	—	23	39	Dream Painter
"Ain't Love a Good Thing"	1973	—	10	12	That's the Way Love Goes
"Dallas"	1974	—	35	—	That's the Way Love Goes
"I Never Knew (What That Song Meant Before)"	1974	—	13	—	I Never Knew What That Song Meant Before
"I've Got My Baby on My Mind"	1974	—	13	31	I Got a Lot of Hurtin' Done Today/ I've Got My Baby on My Mind
"I Got a Lot of Hurtin' Done Today"	1975	—	30	45	I Got a Lot of Hurtin' Done Today/ I've Got My Baby on My Mind
"Why Don't You Love Me"	1975	—	15	20	I Got a Lot of Hurtin' Done Today/ I've Got My Baby on My Mind
"The Song We Fell in Love To"	1975	—	29	—	The Song We Fell in Love To
"(Till) I Kissed You"	1976	—	10	1	The Song We Fell in Love To
"So Sad (To Watch Good Love Go Bad)"	1976	—	31	—	I Don't Wanna Talk It Over Anymore
"I Don't Wanna Talk It Over Anymore"	1976	—	13	—	I Don't Wanna Talk It Over Anymore
"The Latest Shade of Blue"	1977	—	42	—	I Don't Wanna Talk It Over Anymore
"Coming Around"	1977	—	58	—	Pure Connie Smith
"I Just Want to Be Your Everything"	1977	—	14	23	New Horizons
"Lovin' You Baby"	1978	—	34	—	New Horizons
"There'll Never Be Another for Me"	1978	—	68	—	New Horizons
"Smooth Sailin'"	1978	—	68	—	Non-album singles
"Lovin' You, Lovin' Me" (Note: "Lovin' You, Lovin' Me" and "Ten Thousand and One" were both counted by Billboard as a double A-sided single.)	1979	—	88	—	Non-album singles
"Ten Thousand and One" (Note: "Lovin' You, Lovin' Me" and "Ten Thousand and One" were both counted by Billboard as a double A-sided single.)	1979	—	88	—	Non-album singles
"Don't Say Love"	1979	—	93	—	Non-album singles
"Don't Make Me Dream"	1983	—	—	—	Non-album singles
"Rough at the Edges"	1983	—	—	—	Non-album singles
"A Far Cry from You"	1985	—	71	—	Non-album singles
"Hold Me Back"	1986	—	—	—	Non-album singles
"Look Out Heart"	2021	—	—	—	The Cry of the Heart
"Here Comes My Baby Back Again"	2021	—	—	—	The Cry of the Heart
"—" denotes a recording that did not chart or was not released in that territory.

=== As a collaborative artist ===
List of singles, with selected chart positions, showing other relevant details
Title	Year	Peak chart positions	Album
Title	Year	US Country	Album
"Chet's Tune" (as Some of Chet's Friends)	1967	38	Non-album single
"Young Love" (with Nat Stuckey)	1969	20	Young Love
"If God Is Dead (Who's That Living in My Soul)" (with Nat Stuckey)	1970	59	Sunday Morning with Nat Stuckey and Connie Smith
"—" denotes a recording that did not chart or was not released in that territory.

== Other charted songs ==
List of songs, with selected chart positions, showing other relevant details
Title	Year	Peak chart positions	Album	Notes
Title	Year	US Country	Album	Notes
"Tiny Blue Transistor Radio"	1965	25	Connie Smith	(Note: B-side to "Then and Only Then".)

== Music videos ==
Year	Video
1984	"Once a Day"

== See also ==
- Connie Smith albums discography
- List of artists who reached number one on the U.S. country chart
- List of number-one country hits (United States)
- List of years in country music
