= Connie Smith albums discography =

Connie Smith discography
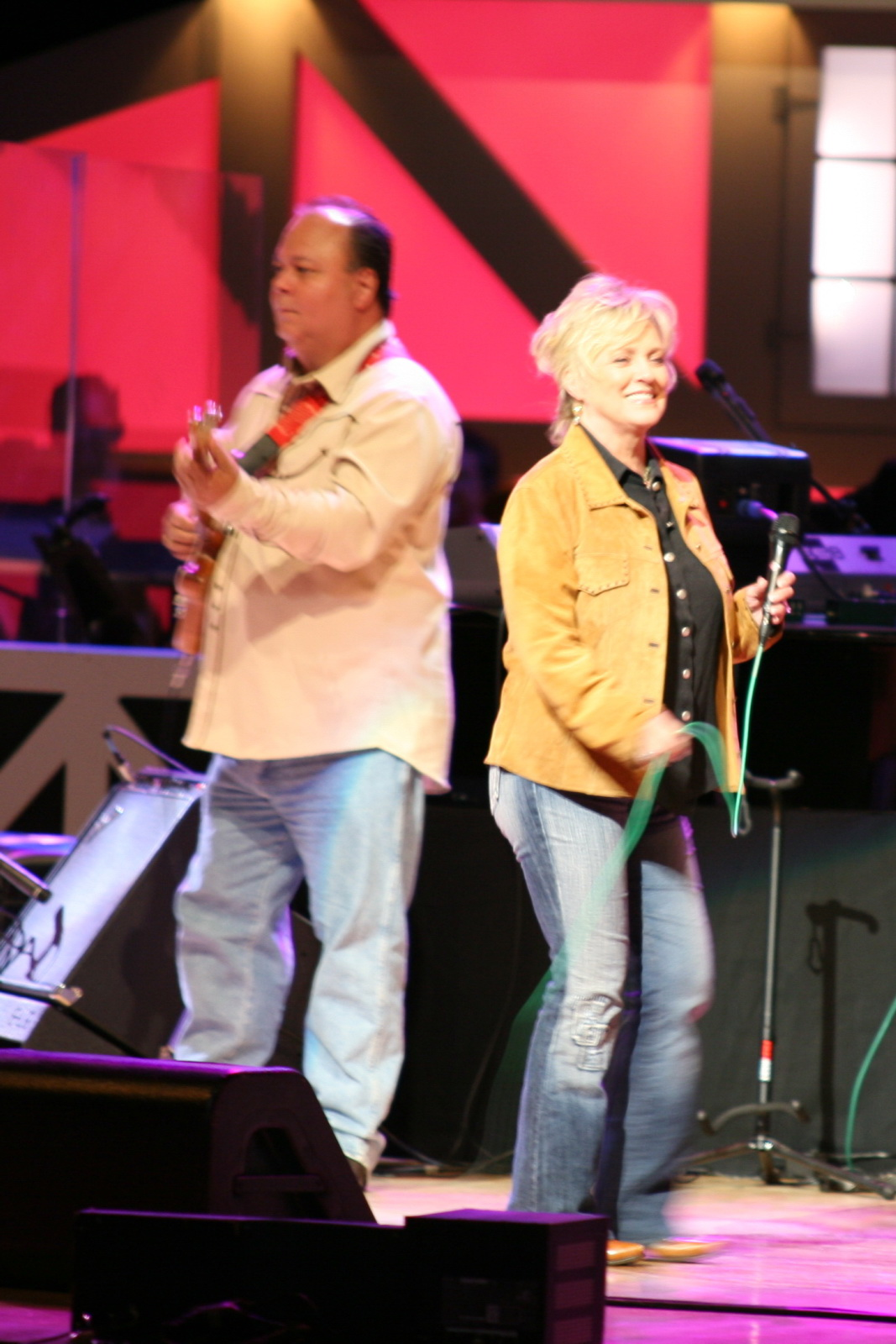
- Connie Smith at the Grand Ole Opry (2007).
- Studio albums: 40
- Live albums: 1
- Compilation albums: 14
- Box sets: 3
- Other appearances: 26

The albums discography of Connie Smith, an American country artist, consists of 40 studio albums, one live album, 14 compilation albums, three box sets, and 26 other appearances. After the success of her 1964 single "Once a Day", Smith's self-titled debut album was released in March 1965 on RCA Victor Records. The album reached number one on the Billboard Top Country Albums, spending thirty weeks on the chart, while also becoming her only album to reach the Billboard 200 list (#105). Smith's next two secular albums, Cute 'n' Country and Miss Smith Goes to Nashville went to number one and number two respectively between 1965 and 1966. In September 1966 Smith released her fifth studio album, Born to Sing, which was her third album to reach the top spot on the Billboard country albums chart. Due to Smith's popularity, RCA Victor issued five albums between 1967 and 1968 including Downtown Country (1967), Connie Smith Sings Bill Anderson (1967), and I Love Charley Brown (1968). In 1969, Smith collaborated with country artist Nat Stuckey on the album Young Love.

In the early 70s, Smith released a series of albums including I Never Once Stopped Loving You (1970), Just One Time (1971), Ain't We Havin' Us a Good Time (1972), and If It Ain't Love and Other Great Dallas Frazier Songs. In addition, Smith released her third Gospel album in 1971 entitled Come Along and Walk with Me. After signing with Columbia Records in 1973, Smith released A Lady Named Smith, which peaked at #31 on the Billboard Top Country Albums chart. In 1974 she released the albums That's the Way Love Goes and I Never Knew (What That Song Meant Before), the latter of which went to #22 on the Billboard country albums chart. Before departing Columbia in 1977, Smith released three more studio releases including 1975's Connie Smith Sings Hank Williams Gospel and 1976's I Don't Wanna Talk It Over Anymore. In 1977 Smith moved to Monument Records where she recorded two albums. Taking a twenty-year break to raise her five children, Smith returned in 1998 with a self-titled album on Warner Bros. Records. In 2003 she collaborated with Barbara Fairchild and Sharon White on the Gospel album Love Never Fails. In August 2011, Smith released her thirty-sixth solo studio album on the Sugar Hill label entitled Long Line of Heartaches.

== Studio albums ==
=== As lead artist ===
List of albums, with selected chart positions, showing other relevant details
Title	Album details	Peak chart positions	
Title	Album details	US	US Cou.
Connie Smith	Released: March 1965; Label: RCA Victor; Formats: LP	105	1
Cute 'n' Country	Released: October 1965; Label: RCA Victor; Formats: LP	—	1
Miss Smith Goes to Nashville	Released: March 1966; Label: RCA Victor; Formats: LP	—	2
Connie Smith Sings Great Sacred Songs	Released: June 1966; Label: RCA Victor; Formats: LP	—	19
Born to Sing	Released: September 1966; Label: RCA Victor; Formats: LP	—	1
Downtown Country	Released: February 1967; Label: RCA Victor; Formats: LP	—	5
Connie in the Country	Released: February 1967; Label: RCA Camden; Formats: LP	—	—
Connie Smith Sings Bill Anderson	Released: May 1967; Label: RCA Victor; Formats: LP	—	11
Soul of Country Music	Released: December 1967; Label: RCA Victor; Formats: LP	—	7
I Love Charley Brown	Released: April 1968; Label: RCA Victor; Formats: LP	—	14
Sunshine and Rain	Released: October 1968; Label: RCA Victor; Formats: LP	—	32
Connie's Country	Released: April 1969; Label: RCA Victor; Formats: LP	—	14
Back in Baby's Arms	Released: October 1969; Label: RCA Victor; Formats: LP	—	12
I Never Once Stopped Loving You	Released: September 1970; Label: RCA Victor; Formats: LP	—	15
Where Is My Castle	Released: January 1971; Label: RCA Victor; Formats: LP	—	39
Just One Time	Released: June 1971; Label: RCA Victor; Formats: LP	—	20
Come Along and Walk with Me	Released: October 1971; Label: RCA Victor; Formats: LP	—	—
Ain't We Havin' Us a Good Time	Released: April 1972; Label: RCA Victor; Formats: LP	—	25
If It Ain't Love and Other Great Dallas Frazier Songs	Released: July 1972; Label: RCA Victor; Formats: LP	—	14
A Lady Named Smith	Released: May 1973; Label: Columbia; Formats: LP	—	31
God Is Abundant	Released: November 1973; Label: Columbia; Formats: LP	—	20
That's the Way Love Goes	Released: March 1974; Label: Columbia; Formats: LP	—	41
I Never Knew (What That Song Meant Before)	Released: August 1974; Label: Columbia; Formats: LP	—	22
I Got a Lot of Hurtin' Done Today/ I Got My Baby on My Mind	Released: January 1975; Label: Columbia; Formats: LP	—	30
Connie Smith Sings Hank Williams Gospel	Released: May 1975; Label: Columbia; Formats: LP	—	47
Joy to the World	Released: October 1975; Label: Columbia; Formats: LP	—	—
The Song We Fell in Love To	Released: March 1976; Label: Columbia; Formats: LP	—	34
I Don't Wanna Talk It Over Anymore	Released: October 1976; Label: Columbia; Formats: LP	—	33
Pure Connie Smith	Released: November 1977; Label: Monument; Formats: LP	—	—
New Horizons	Released: March 1978; Label: Monument; Formats: LP	—	—
The Best of Connie Smith	Released: 1989; Label: Dominion; Formats: LP, CD, cassette	—	—
By Request	Released: 1995; Label: Self-released; Formats: CD	—	—
Clinging to a Saving Hand	Released: 1995; Label: Self-released; Formats: CD	—	—
Connie Smith	Released: October 6, 1998; Label: Warner Bros. Nashville; Formats: CD, Cassette	—	—
Long Line of Heartaches	Released: August 23, 2011; Label: Sugar Hill; Formats: CD, music download	—	—
The Cry of the Heart	Released: August 21, 2021; Label: Fat Possum; Formats: LP, CD, music download	— (Note: The Cry of the Heart did reach the Billboard 200 chart, but it did peak at number 92 on the Billboard Current Albums Sales chart.)	—
Love, Prison, Wisdom and Heartaches	Release: April 11, 2024; Label: Fat Possum; Formats: LP, CD, music download	—	—
"—" denotes a recording that did not chart or was not released in that territory.

=== As a collaborative artist ===
List of albums, with selected chart positions, showing other relevant details
Title	Album details	Peak chart positions
Title	Album details	US Country
Young Love (with Nat Stuckey)	Released: July 1969; Label: RCA Victor; Formats: LP	29
Sunday Morning with Nat Stuckey and Connie Smith (with Nat Stuckey) (Note: In 2002, the album was re-released by Music Row Talent Records with a different track listing under the title, God Will.)	Released: January 1970; Label: RCA Victor; Formats: LP	—
Love Never Fails (with Barbara Fairchild and Sharon White)	Released: August 12, 2003; Label: Daywind; Formats: CD	—
"—" denotes a recording that did not chart or was not released in that territory.

== Compilation albums ==
List of albums, with selected chart positions, showing other relevant details
Title	Album details	Peak chart positions
Title	Album details	US Country
The Best of Connie Smith	Released: September 1967; Label: RCA Victor; Formats: LP	22
The Best of Connie Smith Volume II	Released: March 1970; Label: RCA Victor; Formats: LP	26
My Heart Has a Mind of Its Own	Released: May 1971; Label: RCA Camden; Formats: LP	—
City Lights: Country Favorites	Released: April 1972; Label: RCA Camden; Formats: LP	—
Love Is the Look You're Looking For	Released: February 1973; Label: RCA Victor; Formats: LP	24
Dream Painter	Released: July 1973; Label: RCA Victor; Formats: LP	39
Connie Smith's Greatest Hits, Vol. I	Released: October 1973; Label: RCA Victor; Formats: LP	39
Connie Smith Now	Released: July 1974; Label: RCA Victor; Formats: LP	40
The Best of Connie Smith	Released: April 1977; Label: Columbia; Formats: LP	—
Greatest Hits on Monument	Released: March 9, 1993; Label: Sony; Formats: Cassette, CD	—
The Essential Connie Smith	Released: April 1996; Label: RCA; Formats: Cassette, CD, music download	—
Connie Smith Sings Her Hits	Released: 1997; Label: Sony Special Products; Formats: Cassette, CD	—
All American Country	Released: October 24, 2003; Label: BMG; Formats: Cassette, CD	—
The Lost Tapes	Released: May 19, 2015; Label: Country Rewind; Formats: CD, digital download	—
The RCA Sessions (1965-1972)	Released: June 1, 2018; Label: RCA Victor; Formats: CD, digital download	—
The Essential Connie Smith	Released: August 31, 2018; Label: Legacy; Formats: Music download	—
"—" denotes a recording that did not chart or was not released in that territory.

== Live albums ==
List of box sets, showing relevant ideals
Title	Album details
Live in Branson, MO, USA	Released: 1993; Label: Laserlight; Formats: Cassette, CD

== Box sets ==
List of box sets, showing relevant ideals
Title	Album details
Born to Sing	Released: May 8, 2001; Label: Bear Family; Formats: CD
Just for What I Am	Released: February 27, 2012; Label: Bear Family; Formats: CD
The Latest Shade of Blue: The Columbia Recordings 1973–1976	Released: November 5, 2021; Label: Bear Family; Formats: CD

== Other appearances ==
List of non-single guest appearances, with other performing artists, showing year released and album name
Title	Year	Other artist(s)	Album
"Silent Night, Holy Night"	1986	Willie Nelson	The Nashville Christmas Album
"We've Got Love"	1991	Tommy Cash	The 25th Anniversary Album
"What Child Is This" (live)	1995	—N/a	Christmas in Branson
"Beautiful Star of Bethlehem"	1998	Ralph Stanley	Clinch Mountain Country
"So Sad (To Watch Good Love Go Bad)"	1999	John Prine	In Spite of Ourselves
"Loose Talk"	1999	John Prine	In Spite of Ourselves
"Unmitigated Gall"	2002	Dawn Sears	Dawn Sears
"Meet Me in Heaven"	2002	Janette Carter, Johnny Cash, June Carter Cash, Earl Scruggs, Marty Stuart, Darrin Vincent	Kindred Spirits: A Tribute to the Songs of Johnny Cash
"I Love You So Much It Hurts Me"	2003	Floyd Tillman	The Influence
"It Ain't That Way"	2004	George Hamilton IV	Songs of Faith and Inspiration
"Big Foot"	2005	Marty Stuart	Badlands: Ballads of the Lakota
"Over the Next Hill We'll Be Home"	2006	—N/a	Voice of the Spirit, Gospel of the South
"The Prayer of Drunkard's Little Girl"	2007	—N/a	Always Life Him Up: A Tribute to Blind Alfred Reed
"A Good Place to Turn Around"	2007	Gene Watson	In a Perfect World
"Hearts Like Ours"	2007	Marty Stuart	Compadres: An Anthology of Duets
"Happy Birthday"	2008	Loretta Lynn	Loretta Lynn Singing Her Early Hits, Live!
"What Would You Give in Exchange for Your Soul"	2009	Bobby Osborne, Marty Stuart	Bluegrass & Beyond
"I Run to You"	2010	Marty Stuart	Ghost Train: The Studio B Sessions
"Workin' on a Road"	2010	Jeff & Sheri Easter, Marty Start, Eddie Stubbs	Expecting Good Things
"Talk to Me Lonesome Heart"	2010	Larry Stephenson, Marty Stuart	20th Anniversary
"Just for What I Am"	2011	Anna Wilson	Countrypolitan Duets
"Didn't We Shine"	2011	George Jones, Lorrie Morgan, Joe Stampley, Randy Travis, Gene Watson	Anniversary Celebration
"There Will Be Peace in the Valley for Me"	2012	—N/a	Opry Legends: Gospel Favorites
"Great Judgement Morning"	2013	Jessi Colter, George Jones, Ricky Skaggs, Marty Stuart, Travis Tritt	Amazing Grace
"Walking Up My Lord to Calvary's Hill" (live)	2014	Marty Stuart	The Gospel Music of Marty Stuart
"Senses"	2017	Jeannie Seely; Marty Stuart	Written in Song

== See also ==
- Connie Smith singles discography
- List of years in country music
