= The Best of Connie Smith (1967 album) =

Greatest hits album by Connie Smith
- Released: September 1967
- Recorded: 1964 – 1966
- Studio: RCA Studio A; RCA Studio B
- Genre: Country; Nashville Sound
- Label: RCA Victor
- Producer: Bob Ferguson

Connie Smith chronology
Connie Smith Sings Bill Anderson (1967)	The Best of Connie Smith (1967)	Soul of Country Music (1967)

Singles from The Best of Connie Smith
- 1. "I'll Come Runnin'" Released: February 1967

The Best of Connie Smith is a compilation album by American country singer Connie Smith. It was released in September 1967 by RCA Victor and featured 12 tracks. The disc was Smith's first compilation project released in her career and featured her most popular singles made commercially successful between 1964 and 1967. It also featured one new recording titled "I'll Come Runnin'". Penned by Smith herself and released as a single, the song became a top ten hit on the American country songs chart in 1967.

== Background and content ==
Three years prior to the compilation's release, Connie Smith had reached the peak of her commercial success with 1964's "Once a Day". The song spent eight weeks at the number one spot on the country songs chart and brought a series of follow-up singles into the top ten. RCA Victor had previously issued seven studio albums of her material between 1965 and 1967, sometimes releasing three studio albums per year. The Best of Connie Smith would be her first compilation with the label. It consisted of 12 tracks, all recorded between 1964 and 1966. Nine of these tracks were previously released as singles and reached the top ten of the country chart: "Once a Day" (which topped the chart), "Then and Only Then", "I Can't Remember", "If I Talk to Him", "Nobody But a Fool (Would Love You)", "Ain't Had No Lovin'", "The Hurtin's All Over", "I'll Come Runnin'" and "Cincinnati, Ohio".

The track, "I Saw a Man", was included on Smith's 1966 gospel album called Connie Smith Sings Great Sacred Songs. However, it was not originally released as a single. Another track titled "Darling, Are You Ever Coming Home" first appeared on Smith's eponymous debut studio album but was also not issued as a single. "I'll Come Runnin'" was a new track, penned by Smith. She had attempted to record the track twice with string instrumentation. On a third session done in a traditional country style (and with steel guitarist Weldon Myrick), the song was put on the compilation.

== Release and reception ==
Professional ratings
Review scores
Source	Rating
Allmusic	2.5/5 stars

The Best of Connie Smith was released in September 1967 and would mark Smith's first compilation album in her career. It was originally released as a vinyl LP, with six songs on each side of the record. In 1969, RCA Victor issued the album on cassette. The compilation spent 16 weeks on the American Billboard Top Country Albums chart, peaking at number 22 by December 1967. It was Smith's first LP to chart outside the top 20. The album received mixed reception from reviewers. "Dealers shouldn't have any fears about stocking this one," wrote Billboard magazine in October 1967. "The Best of Connie Smith is a much-too-brief sampling of Connie Smith's biggest hits," wrote Thom Owens of AllMusic. He only gave the album two out of five stars. The only new single included was "I'll Come Runnin'", originally issued by RCA Victor in February 1967. Spending 15 weeks on the Billboard Hot Country Songs chart, it peaked at number ten in May 1967.

== Track listings ==
=== Vinyl version ===
Side one
No.	Title	Writer(s)	Original album	Length
1.	"Once a Day"	Bill Anderson	Connie Smith	2:17
2.	"I Can't Remember"	Bill Anderson; Bette Anderson	Cute 'n' Country	2:31
3.	"Tiny Blue Transistor Radio"	Bill Anderson	Connie Smith	2:30
4.	"I'll Come Runnin'"	Connie Smith	—	2:03
5.	"I Saw a Man"	Arthur Q. Smith	Connie Smith Sings Great Sacred Songs	2:42
6.	"If I Talk to Him"	Dolores Edgin; Priscilla Mitchell	Miss Smith Goes to Nashville	2:25

Side two
No.	Title	Writer(s)	Original album	Length
1.	"Then and Only Then"	Bill Anderson	Connie Smith	2:23
2.	"Ain't Had No Lovin'"	Dallas Frazier	Born to Sing	2:17
3.	"Darling, Are You Ever Coming Home"	Hank Cochran; Willie Nelson	Connie Smith	2:10
4.	"The Hurtin's All Over"	Harlan Howard	Downtown Country	2:50
5.	"Cincinnati, Ohio"	Bill Anderson	Connie Smith Sings Bill Anderson	2:10
6.	"Nobody But a Fool (Would Love You)"	Bill Anderson	Miss Smith Goes to Nashville	2:28

=== Cassette version ===
Side one
No.	Title	Writer(s)	Original album	Length
1.	"Once a Day"	Bill Anderson	Connie Smith	2:17
2.	"I Can't Remember"	Bill Anderson; Bette Anderson	Cute 'n' Country	2:31
3.	"Cincinnati, Ohio"	Bill Anderson	Connie Smith Sings Bill Anderson	2:10
4.	"Tiny Blue Transistor Radio"	Bill Anderson	Connie Smith	2:30
5.	"I'll Come Runnin'"	C. Smith	—	2:03
6.	"I Saw a Man"	A. Smith	Connie Smith Sings Great Sacred Songs	2:42

Side two
No.	Title	Writer(s)	Original album	Length
1.	"If I Talk to Him"	Edgin; Mitchell	Miss Smith Goes to Nashville	2:25
2.	"Then and Only Then"	Bill Anderson	Connie Smith	2:23
3.	"Nobody But a Fool (Would Love You)"	Bill Anderson	Miss Smith Goes to Nashville	2:28
4.	"Ain't Had No Lovin'"	Frazier	Born to Sing	2:17
5.	"Darling, Are You Ever Coming Home"	Cochran; Nelson	Connie Smith	2:17
6.	"The Hurtin's All Over"	Howard	Downtown Country	2:50

== Chart performance ==
Chart (1967)	Peak position
US Top Country Albums (Billboard)	22

== Release history ==
Region	Date	Format	Label	Ref.
North America	September 1967	Vinyl	RCA Victor Records	
North America	1969	Cassette	RCA Victor Records	
Japan	1969	Vinyl	RCA Records	
United Kingdom	1972	Vinyl	RCA Victor Records	
