= The Essential Connie Smith =

Compilation album by Connie Smith
- Released: April 1996
- Recorded: July 16, 1964 – April 11, 1972
- Genre: Country, Nashville sound
- Length: 50:41
- Label: RCA Records
- Producer: Bob Ferguson (original sessions); Ethel Gabriel; Steve Lindsey

Connie Smith chronology
Live in Branson, MO, USA (1993)	The Essential Connie Smith (1996)	Connie Smith (1998)

The Essential Connie Smith is a compilation album by the American country artist Connie Smith. It was released in April 1996 by RCA Records and was produced by Bob Ferguson and Ethel Gabriel. The album is a collection of Smith's major hits between 1964 and 1972.

== Background ==
The Essential Connie Smith contains twenty tracks of material that Smith had recorded for RCA Records. Of the tracks, nineteen were singles ("How Great Thou Art" was the only exception), including Smith's biggest hit, "Once a Day", which spent eight weeks at #1 on the Billboard Country Chart in 1964 and 1965. The album also includes Smith's other well-known hits such as, "Cry, Cry, Cry", "Burning a Hole in My Mind", "Just One Time", "I Never Once Stopped Loving You", "The Hurtin's All Over", "If It Ain't Love (Let's Leave It Alone)" and her cover version of Marty Robbins's "Ribbon of Darkness". The Allmusic critic, Thom Jurek, called the album's production "classic" and credited Smith's original producer, Bob Ferguson and country artist, Bill Anderson for making the compilation, "One of the best collections in the RCA Essential series to come down the pike".

== Critical reception ==
Professional ratings
Review scores
Source	Rating
Allmusic	5/5 stars

Allmusic reviewer Thom Jurek gave the compilation five out of five stars, giving it the "album pick" from Smith's other compilations. Jurek praised Smith's voice, stating, "Connie Smith is perhaps the only female singer in the history of country music who can truly claim to be the heiress to Patsy Cline's throne. It's not that there aren't many amazing vocalists in the field, and plenty of legends among them. But in terms of the pure gift of interpretation of taking virtually any song and making it a country song of class and distinction, Smith is it." Jurek further said that all of the album's tracks were "pure honey and silk".

The album received a less positive review from Slipcue.com, which called it a "tepid retrospective". The reviewer said, "Yeah, it's got a few of the good ones on it, but not enough. If you've never heard Connie Smith before, and you're curious -- yes, this is pretty much the place to start."

== Track listing ==
No.	Title	Writer(s)	Length
1.	"Once a Day"	Bill Anderson	2:17
2.	"Nobody But a Fool (Would Love You)"	Anderson	2:30
3.	"I Can't Remember"	Anderson, Becki Anderson	2:29
4.	"Cry, Cry, Cry"	Shirley Wood	2:33
5.	"Then and Only Then"	Anderson	2:33
6.	"If I Talk to Him"	Dolores Edgin, Priscilla Mitchell	2:26
7.	"Ain't Had No Lovin'"	Dallas Frazier	2:27
8.	"The Hurtin's All Over"	Harlan Howard	2:49
9.	"I Never Once Stopped Loving You"	Anderson, Jan Howard	2:50
10.	"You and Your Sweet Love"	Anderson	2:54
11.	"Cincinnati, Ohio"	Anderson	2:11
12.	"I'll Come Runnin'"	Connie Smith	2:06
13.	"Burning a Hole in My Mind"	Cy Coben	2:23
14.	"Run Away Little Tears"	Frazier	2:29
15.	"Ribbon of Darkness"	Gordon Lightfoot	2:40
16.	"Just One Time"	Don Gibson	2:30
17.	"Just for What I Am"	Frazier, Arthur Leo Owens	2:26
18.	"Love Is the Look You're Looking for"	Rose Lee Maphis	2:11
19.	"If It Ain't Love (Let's Leave It Alone)"	Frazier	2:29
20.	"How Great Thou Art"	Stuart K. Hine	4:14

== Personnel ==
- Connie Smith – guitar, lead vocals

Technical personnel

- Wade Jessen – liner notes
- Deb Mahalannobis – design
- Benny Quinn – digital remastering
