= Soul of Country Music =

Studio album by Connie Smith
- Released: December 1967
- Recorded: May 24–26, 1967
- Studio: RCA Victor Studio
- Genre: Country
- Length: 31:33
- Label: RCA Victor
- Producer: Bob Ferguson

Connie Smith chronology
The Best of Connie Smith (1967)	Soul of Country Music (1967)	I Love Charley Brown (1968)

Soul of Country Music is the ninth studio album by American country singer Connie Smith. It was released in December 1967 by RCA Victor and contained 12 tracks. The album included mostly covers of previously recorded songs. It received mixed reviews from critics following its release and reached the top ten of the American country albums chart.

== Background ==
Prior to the Soul of Country Music, Connie Smith had reached peak career success with a series of top ten country singles like "Then and Only Then" (1965), "If I Talk to Him" (1965), "Ain't Had No Lovin'" (1966) and "The Hurtin's All Over" (1967). These songs were fueled by the success of Smith's 1964 debut single "Once a Day", which spent eight weeks at the top of the country chart. The RCA Victor and Camden labels had previously released eight studio albums and one compilation album of her material. The sessions held for these projects between 1966 and 1967 were backed by string instrumentation to provide a "middle of the road" pop-inspired sound. For the Soul of Country Music, RCA chose to bring Smith back to a "small group context again", according to writer Colin Escott. For the project, strings were removed and replaced by traditional country instrumentation, including the fiddle.

== Recording and content ==
The sessions for the Soul of Country Music were held over the course of three days: May 24, May 25, and May 26, 1967. The recording sessions took place at the RCA Victor Studio, located in Nashville, Tennessee and were overseen by producer Bob Ferguson. The liner notes for the album were written by George Jones. A total of 12 tracks comprised the project. The album contained cover versions of songs first recorded by other performers. Its country covers were George Jones's "Walk Through This World with Me, Jack Greene's "There Goes My Everything", Glen Campbell's "Burning Bridges", Rex Griffin's "The Last Letter", Jean Shepard's "If Teardrops Were Silver", Warner Mack's "Surely" and Claude Gray's "Family Bible". It also included a cover of the Ames Brothers's "It Only Hurts for a Little While". Wynn Stewart reached the top of country chart a week after Smith cut his single "It's Such a Pretty World Today".

== Release and reception ==
Professional ratings
Review scores
Source	Rating
Allmusic	3/5 stars

Soul of the Country Music was first released in December 1967 on the RCA Victor label. It was the ninth studio collection of Smith's music career and her eighth with RCA Victor (RCA Camden had issued one studio album of her songs). The project was originally distributed as a vinyl LP, containing six songs on both sides of the record. Decades later, it was re-released to digital and streaming sites through Sony Music Entertainment. Soul of Country Music spent eighteen weeks on the American Billboard Top Country Albums chart, peaking at the number seven position in April 1968. It was Smith's final LP to place on the chart in her career.

The album received mixed reviews following its release. Billboard magazine criticized Smith's delivery and the album's production. "Except for one song–"It Only Hurts for a Little While"–the rest of the songs on this album sound sound as if Connie Smith wasn't too interested in them when she recorded them. Perhaps one should blame her producer for not demanding her best effort," the publication commented. Dan Cooper of AllMusic gave the album three out of five stars. "More of the same unearthly sound, but this has Smith covering -- at times burying -- other singers' hits. Her version of Rex Griffin's 'The Last Letter' is almost literally to die for," he stated.

== Track listings ==
=== Vinyl version ===
Side one
No.	Title	Writer(s)	Original artist	Length
1.	"Don't Keep Me Lonely Too Long"	Melba Montgomery	Melba Montgomery	2:29
2.	"Surely"	Peggy Whittington	Warner Mack	2:19
3.	"The Last Letter"	Rex Griffin	Rex Griffin	4:00
4.	"Burning Bridges"	Walter Scott	Jack Scott	2:31
5.	"I'm Your Woman"	Jean Chapel	Jean Chapel	2:41
6.	"There Goes My Everything"	Dallas Frazier	Jack Greene	2:54

Side two
No.	Title	Writer(s)	Original artist	Length
1.	"It Only Hurts for a Little While"	Mack David; Fred Spielman	Ames Brothers	2:08
2.	"Family Bible"	Walt Breeland; Paul Buskirk; Claude Gray	Claude Gray	3:16
3.	"If Teardrops Were Silver"	Don Wayne	Jean Shepard	2:09
4.	"Walk Through This World with Me"	Kay Savage; Sandy Seamons	George Jones	2:20
5.	"It's Such a Pretty World Today"	Dale Noe	Wynn Stewart	2:22
6.	"Touch My Heart"	Aubrey Mayhew; Johnny Paycheck	Ray Price	2:13

=== Digital version ===
Soul of Country Music (download and streaming)
No.	Title	Writer(s)	Original artist	Length
1.	"Don't Keep Me Lonely Too Long"	Montgomery	Melba Montgomery	2:32
2.	"Surely"	Peggy Whittington	Warner Mack	2:23
3.	"The Last Letter"	Griffin	Rex Griffin	4:04
4.	"Burning Bridges"	Walter Scott	Jack Scott	2:35
5.	"I'm Your Woman"	Chapel	Jean Chapel	2:45
6.	"There Goes My Everything"	Frazier	Jack Greene	2:57
7.	"It Only Hurts for a Little While"	David; Spielman	Ames Brothers	2:12
8.	"Family Bible"	Breeland; Buskirk; Gray	Claude Gray	3:20
9.	"If Teardrops Were Silver"	Don Wayne	Jean Shepard	2:13
10.	"Walk Through This World with Me"	Savage; Seamons	George Jones	2:23
11.	"It's Such a Pretty World Today"	Noe	Wynn Stewart	2:26
12.	"Touch My Heart"	Mayhew; Paycheck	Ray Price	2:14

== Personnel ==
All credits are adapted from the liner notes of Soul of Country Music and the biography booklet by Colin Escott titled Born to Sing.

Musical personnel

- Dorothy Dillard – background vocals
- Ray Edenton – guitar
- Buddy Harman – drums
- Russ Hicks – steel guitar
- Priscilla Hubbard – background vocals
- Roy Huskey Jr. – bass
- Louis Nunley – background vocals
- Charles Justice – fiddle
- Dean Porter – guitar
- Hargus "Pig" Robbins – piano
- Connie Smith – lead vocals
- Lamar Watkins – guitar
- William Wright – background vocals

Technical personnel

- Bob Ferguson – Producer
- George Jones – Liner Notes
- Jim Malloy – Engineer

== Chart performance ==
Chart (1967–1968)	Peak position
US Top Country Albums (Billboard)	7

== Release history ==
Region	Date	Format	Label	Ref.
North America	December 1967	Vinyl	RCA Victor Records	
North America	2010s	Music download; streaming	Sony Music Entertainment	
