= The Best of Connie Smith (1989 album) =

Studio album (re-recording) by Connie Smith
- Released: 1989
- Recorded: 1983
- Genre: Country
- Label: Dominion

Connie Smith chronology
New Horizons (1978)	The Best of Connie Smith (1989)	Greatest Hits on Monument (1993)

The Best of Connie Smith is the thirty-first solo studio album by American country artist Connie Smith. It was released in 1989 via Dominion Entertainment and contained 12 tracks. The album was a re-recording of Smith's best-known singles, including "Once a Day" and "Ain't Had No Lovin'". The album was issued in several formats in its original release.

== Background ==
Connie Smith rose to stardom in 1964 with her debut single "Once a Day". The song spent eight weeks at number one on the American country chart and launched a series of commercially successful singles over the next ten years. She departed her recording company in 1979 and went into semi-retirement to raise a family. She returned in 1985 and briefly recorded with Epic Records. From there, Smith continued her career. The Best of Connie Smith had actually been recorded in 1983 in Nashville, Tennessee. It was a collection of 12 re-recordings containing some of Smith's most well-known songs.

== Content, release and reception ==
The Best of Connie Smith included remakes of the singles "Once a Day", "Ain't Had No Lovin'", "Then and Only Then", "The Hurtin's All Over", "Cincinnati, Ohio" and "If I Talk to Him". Two songs on the album were new recordings. The first was the gospel tune "Jesus Is Your Ticket to Heaven". The second was the country selection "I'd Rather Believe in You". The album was released in 1989 on Dominion Entertainment. It was offered as a vinyl LP, a cassette and a compact disc. In 2006, the American Legends label released the songs on the album in their compilation The Queen of Broken Hearts. Although no formal review was given in the album's original issue, the 2006 re-release was given a negative reception from AllMusic: "The ten tracks that make up Connie Smith's Queen of the Broken Hearts should be avoided as these are re-recorded versions of her most popular songs," wrote reviewer Al Campbell.

== Track listings ==
=== Vinyl version ===
Side one
No.	Title	Length
1.	"Once a Day"	2:14
2.	"Ain't Had No Lovin'"	2:20
3.	"Then and Only Then"	2:24
4.	"I Never Once Stopped Loving You"	2:50
5.	"Just for What I Am"	2:21
6.	"I'd Rather Believe in You"	3:31

Side two
No.	Title	Length
1.	"Just One Time"	2:27
2.	"The Hurtin's All Over"	2:46
3.	"Nobody But a Fool (Would Love You)"	2:25
4.	"Cincinnati, Ohio"	2:03
5.	"If I Talk to Him"	2:27
6.	"Jesus Is Your Ticket to Heaven"	3:11

=== Compact disc version ===
The Best of Connie Smith
No.	Title	Length
1.	"Once a Day"	2:14
2.	"Ain't Had No Lovin'"	2:20
3.	"Then and Only Then"	2:24
4.	"I Never Once Stopped Loving You"	2:50
5.	"Just for What I Am"	2:21
6.	"I'd Rather Believe in You"	3:31
7.	"Just One Time"	2:27
8.	"The Hurtin's All Over"	2:46
9.	"Nobody But a Fool (Would Love You)"	2:25
10.	"Cincinnati, Ohio"	2:03
11.	"If I Talk to Him"	2:27
12.	"Jesus Is Your Ticket to Heaven"	3:11

== Release history ==
Region	Date	Format	Label	Ref.
Canada; United States	1989	Vinyl	Dominion Entertainment	
Canada; United States	1989	Cassette	Dominion Entertainment	
Canada; United States	1989	Compact disc	Dominion Entertainment	
