= Edgin =

Edgin is a surname. Notable people with the name include:

- Delores Edgin, writer of If I Talk to Him, a song by Connie Smith
- Max Edgin, member of Final Cut, a techno-industrial band
- Josh Edgin, American former professional baseball pitcher
