= Connie in the Country =

Studio album by Connie Smith
- Released: February 1967
- Recorded: August 22–23, 1966
- Studio: RCA Studio B
- Genre: Country
- Length: 22:24
- Label: RCA Camden
- Producer: Bob Ferguson; Ethel Gabriel

Connie Smith chronology
| Downtown Country (1967) | Connie in the Country (1967) | Connie Smith Sings Bill Anderson (1967) |

Singles from Connie in the Country
- 1. "Cry, Cry, Cry" Released: September 1968

Connie in the Country is the seventh studio album by American country singer Connie Smith. It was released in February 1967 on RCA Camden and contained ten tracks. It was her first to be released on RCA's budget Camden label. Unlike most RCA Camden albums which often contained previously issued material, the album consisted of new recordings for Smith's catalog. This included the single, "Cry, Cry, Cry", which was a top 20 hit on the American country songs chart in 1968.

== Background and content ==
Connie Smith had first signed with the RCA label in 1964 and released her first single the same year. That single, "Once a Day", reached number one on the country chart for eight weeks and brought forth a series of top ten singles during the decade. Smith had released six studio albums with RCA Victor between 1965 and 1967. Connie in the Country would be her first studio recording with RCA Camden, a budget subdivision of RCA Victor. Prior to Smith, only country artist Jim Reeves had recorded a studio album with RCA Camden. Smith's RCA Camden project would be a traditionally-influenced country album. According to biographer Colin Escott, "The underlying assumption seemed to be that people who liked hardcore country music wouldn't or couldn't pay full-price."

Smith entered the studio to record the album's tracks between August 22 and August 23 of 1966. The sessions were held at RCA Studio B, located in Nashville, Tennessee. The project was produced by Bob Ferguson and Ethel Gabriel. It was Smith's first recording sessions with Gabriel (she had previously worked alongside Bob Ferguson). A total of ten tracks comprised the album. The album's opening track was a new recording titled "Cry, Cry, Cry". The remaining nine tracks were covers of country music songs. Among these covers were two covers by Loretta Lynn: "You Ain't Woman Enough (To Take My Man)" and "World of Forgotten People". It also featured two songs originally made popular by Buck Owens: "Foolin' Around" and "Love's Gonna Live Here".

== Release and reception ==
Connie in the Country was released in February 1967 on the RCA Camden label. It was the seventh studio album released in Smith's career and first album with RCA Camden. The disc was originally distributed as a vinyl LP, containing five songs on either side of the record. Decades later, the album was re-issued to digital and streaming markets, which included Apple Music. Although the album did not receive a review from AllMusic, its lead track ("Cry, Cry, Cry"), was named an "album pick". "Cry, Cry, Cry" was the only single spawned from the project and was released in September 1968. The single became the first in Smith's career to chart outside the top ten, peaking at number 20 in November 1968.

== Track listings ==
=== Vinyl version ===
Side one
| No. | Title | Writer(s) | Length |
|---|---|---|---|
| 1. | "Cry, Cry, Cry" | Shirley Wood | 2:29 |
| 2. | "Foolin' Around" | Harlan Howard; Buck Owens | 2:12 |
| 3. | "World of Forgotten People" | Loretta Lynn | 2:04 |
| 4. | "I'm Little But I'm Loud" | Boudleaux Bryant; Jimmy Dickens | 2:27 |
| 5. | "Slowly" | Tommy Hill; Webb Pierce | 2:01 |

Side two
| No. | Title | Writer(s) | Length |
|---|---|---|---|
| 1. | "I Overlooked an Orchid (While Searching for a Rose)" | Shirley Lyn; Carl Smith; Carl Story | 2:42 |
| 2. | "A-Sleepin' at the Foot of the Bed" | Luther Patrick; Happy Wilson | 2:07 |
| 3. | "You Ain't Woman Enough (To Take My Man)" | Lynn | 2:17 |
| 4. | "Y'all Come" | Arlie Duff | 2:16 |
| 5. | "Love's Gonna Live Here" | Owens | 1:49 |

=== Digital version ===
Connie in the Country (download and streaming)
| No. | Title | Writer(s) | Length |
|---|---|---|---|
| 1. | "Cry, Cry, Cry" | Wood | 2:35 |
| 2. | "Foolin' Around" | Howard; Owens | 2:17 |
| 3. | "World of Forgotten People" | Lynn | 2:09 |
| 4. | "I'm Little But I'm Loud" | Bryant; Dickens | 2:34 |
| 5. | "Slowly" | Hill; Pierce | 2:06 |
| 6. | "I Overlooked an Orchid (While Searching for a Rose)" | Lyn; Smith; Story | 2:47 |
| 7. | "A-Sleepin' at the Foot of the Bed" | Patrick; Wilson | 2:14 |
| 8. | "You Ain't Woman Enough (To Take My Man)" | Lynn | 2:24 |
| 9. | "Y'all Come Home" | Duff | 2:22 |
| 10. | "Love's Gonna Live Here" | Owens | 1:55 |

== Personnel ==
All credits are adapted from the liner notes of Connie in the Country and the biography booklet by Colin Escott titled Born to Sing.

Musical personnel

- Anita Carter – background vocals
- Dorothy Dillard – background vocals
- Dolores Edgin – background vocals
- Buddy Harman – drums
- Walter Haynes – bass guitar, guitar
- Priscilla Hubbard – background vocals
- Ron Huskey – bass
- Charles Justice – fiddle
- Leonard Miller – drums
- Weldon Myrick – steel guitar
- Louis Nunley – background vocals
- Dean Porter – guitar
- Hargus "Pig" Robbins – piano
- Connie Smith – lead vocals
- Velma Smith – guitar
- William Wright – background vocals

Technical personnel

- Bob Ferguson – Producer
- Ethel Gabriel – Producer
- Al Pachucki – Engineer
- Chuck Seitz – Engineer
- Bill Walker – Contractor

== Release history ==
| Region | Date | Format | Label | Ref. |
|---|---|---|---|---|
| North America | February 1967 | Vinyl | RCA Camden | |
| Japan | 1972 | Vinyl | RCA | |
| North America | 2010s | Music download; streaming | Sony Music Entertainment | |
