= Born to Sing (Connie Smith album) =

Studio album by Connie Smith
- Released: September 1966
- Recorded: April – May 11, 1966
- Studio: RCA Studio A (Nashville, Tennessee)
- Genre: Country; Nashville Sound
- Length: 29:41
- Label: RCA Victor
- Producer: Bob Ferguson

Connie Smith chronology
Connie Smith Sings Great Sacred Songs (1966)	Born to Sing (1966)	Downtown Country (1967)

Singles from Born to Sing
- 1. "Ain't Had No Lovin'" Released: May 1966

Born to Sing is the fifth studio album by American country singer Connie Smith. It was released in September 1966 by RCA Victor and contained 12 tracks. The album was her first to include string instrumentation. It reached the top five of the Billboard Country LP's chart and included the single "Ain't Had No Lovin'".

== Background ==
In 1964, Connie Smith emerged with the number one single titled "Once a Day". The song jump started her career and helped bring the singles "Then and Only Then" and "If I Talk to Him" into the country top ten. During the mid 1960s, country music record producers saw potential to expand into pop markets. They encouraged several artists to record music tailored in this direction. RCA Victor producers Chet Atkins and Bob Ferguson (the latter was Smith's producer) saw crossover potential in her music. In 1966, they organized Smith's sessions for her next album to be recorded with more pop influences. Ferguson brought in arranger Bill Walker to include string instrumentation. This would be Smith's first album to have a string section. This decisions crafted Smith's next studio album Born to Sing. The album was named for the title track, which was composed by Cy Coben.

== Recording and content ==
Smith went into the studio to record the tracks for Born to Sing between April 7 and May 11, 1966. The sessions were produced by Bob Ferguson and took place at RCA Studio A in Nashville, Tennessee. Smith told writer Colin Escott that she was uncomfortable recording in Studio A because of its size. "In Studio B I could judge from the walls what my voice was doing. I controlled it by what I heard and what I felt in the room. The singer loses control in the big studio and the studio takes over." The album's title track was intended for Hank Williams Jr. but was instead cut by Smith. Also included were two selections composed by Dallas Frazier: "A Touch of Yesterday" and "Ain't Had No Lovin'". Three tracks were covers of pop selections: Dean Martin's "I Will" along with Anita Bryant's "Paper Roses" and "In My Little Corner of the World". The track "Gone" was first a country hit by Ferlin Husky. Remaining tracks were original recordings composed by June Carter, Cy Coben, Liz Anderson and several others.

== Release and reception ==
Professional ratings
Review scores
Source	Rating
Allmusic	4.5/5 stars

Born to Sing was first released in September 1966 on the RCA Victor label. It was Smith's fifth studio album in her career. It was distributed as a vinyl LP, containing six songs on both side of the record. Several decades later, Born to Sing was reissued to digital and streaming sites which included Apple Music. In its original release, the album spent 25 weeks on the Billboard magazine Country LP's chart. It became her third and final album to reach the number one spot on the LP's chart, peaking there in December 1966. The album received a 4.5 star rating from AllMusic. Born to Sing included the single "Ain't Had No Lovin'", which was released by RCA Victor in May 1966. It became her highest-peaking song on the Billboard Hot Country Songs chart since "Once a Day", climbing to the number two position.

== Track listings ==
=== Vinyl version ===
Side one
No.	Title	Writer(s)	Length
1.	"Strange"	Curly Fox; Pat White	2:10
2.	"Ain't Had No Lovin'"	Dallas Frazier	2:16
3.	"Five Fingers to Spare"	Liz Anderson	2:17
4.	"Paper Roses"	Fred Spielman; Janice Torre	2:24
5.	"My Little Corner of the World"	Bob Hilliard; Lee Pockriss	2:32
6.	"Gone"	Smokey Rodgers	2:06

Side two
No.	Title	Writer(s)	Length
1.	"Go Away Stranger"	June Carter	2:50
2.	"I Don't Know Why I Keep Loving You"	Fred Carter, Jr.	2:35
3.	"Born to Sing"	Cy Coben	2:05
4.	"Invisible Tears"	Ned Miller; Sue Miller	2:17
5.	"I Will"	Dick Glasser	2:13
6.	"A Touch of Yesterday"	Frazier; Arthur Leo Owens	2:08

=== Digital version ===
Born to Sing (download and streaming)
No.	Title	Writer(s)	Length
1.	"Strange"	Fox; White	2:12
2.	"Ain't Had No Lovin'"	Frazier	2:19
3.	"Five Fingers to Spare"	Anderson	2:21
4.	"Paper Roses"	Spielman; Torre	2:25
5.	"My Little Corner of the World"	Hilliard; Pockriss	2:36
6.	"Gone"	Rodgers	2:09
7.	"Go Away Stranger"	J. Carter	2:54
8.	"I Don't Know Why I Keep Loving You"	F. Carter	2:37
9.	"Born to Sing"	Coben	2:09
10.	"Invisible Tears"	N. Miller; S. Miller	2:20
11.	"I Will"	Glasser	2:18
12.	"A Touch of Yesterday"	Frazier; Owens	2:10

== Personnel ==
All credits are adapted from the liner notes of Born to Sing and the biography booklet by Colin Escott also titled Born to Sing.

Musical personnel

- Byron Bache – cello
- Brenton Banks – violin
- Howard Carpenter – violin
- Jerry Carrigan – drums
- Dorothy Dillard – background vocals
- Ray Edenton – guitar
- Dolores D. Edgin – background vocals
- Solie Fott – viola
- Kenneth Goldsmith – violin
- Buddy Harman – drums
- Priscilla Hubbard – background vocals
- Lillian Hunt – violin
- Roy Huskey – Bass
- Martin Katahn – viola
- Shelly Kurland – violin
- Piere Menard – violin
- Louis Nunley – background vocals
- Jimmy Lance – guitar
- Len Miller – drums
- Wayne Moss – electric guitar
- Weldon Myrick – steel guitar
- Earl Porter – electric guitar
- Connie Smith – lead vocals
- Jerry Smith – piano
- Dorothy Walker – viola
- Pete Wade – guitar
- Harvey Wolfe – cello
- William Guilford Wright, Jr. – background vocals

Technical personnel

- Bob Ferguson – Producer
- Bill Walker – Contractor

== Chart performance ==
Chart (1966–1967)	Peak position
US Top Country Albums (Billboard)	1

== Release history ==
Region	Date	Format	Label	Ref.
North America	September 1966	Vinyl	RCA Victor Records	
North America	2010s	Music download; streaming	Sony Music Entertainment	
