= Connie Smith Sings Bill Anderson =

Studio album by Connie Smith
- Released: May 1967
- Recorded: October 24, 1966 – February 27, 1967
- Studio: RCA Studio A (Nashville, Tennessee)
- Genre: Country
- Label: RCA Victor
- Producer: Bob Ferguson

Connie Smith chronology
Connie in the Country (1967)	Connie Smith Sings Bill Anderson (1967)	The Best of Connie Smith (1967)

Singles from Connie Smith Sings Bill Anderson
- 1. "Cincinnati, Ohio" Released: June 1967

Connie Smith Sings Bill Anderson is the eighth studio album by American country singer Connie Smith. It was released in May 1967 by RCA Victor and featured 12 tracks. The album was dedicated to her mentor, Bill Anderson. It contained several songs made popular by Anderson himself, along with several tracks made popular by other performers. It also included the newly-recorded "Cincinnati, Ohio". Smith released her version as a single, which climbed into the top five of the American country songs charts. The album received favorable reviews following its release.

== Background ==
Connie Smith reached peak career success several years prior with her 1964 debut single titled "Once a Day". Spending eight weeks at the top of the country songs chart, the song launched her career and set forth a series of top ten singles during the decade. Smith had previously recorded seven studio albums released by the RCA Victor and Camden labels between 1965 and 1967. Most of these projects were recorded at RCA Studio B, where she recorded in a traditional country style.

Smith started recording at RCA Studio A in 1966 as the label encouraged her to record more "middle of the road" pop material. Studio A allowed for more string and orchestral instrumentation. Although Smith disliked the new studio, she did favor an album project cut there, which would later be titled Connie Smith Sings Bill Anderson. Bill Anderson had discovered Smith and helped her sign a recording contract with RCA in 1964. Anderson also wrote many of her early singles. Her professional relationship with Anderson prompted the album's creation. Smith later commented that, "It was an honor, not favor" to make the project.

== Recording and content ==
Connie Smith Sings Bill Anderson was recorded in sessions held between October 24, 1966 and February 27, 1967. The recording sessions were produced by Bob Ferguson and were held at RCA Studio A in Nashville, Tennessee. A total of 12 tracks comprised the collection, all of which were self-penned by Bill Anderson. One exception was the track "My Whole World Is Falling Down", which was co-written by Anderson and Jerry Crutchfield. Four of the album's songs had been hit singles by Anderson himself: "That's What It's Like to Be Lonesome", "Walk Out Backwards", "Easy Come – Easy Go" and "I Love You Drops". Anderson had first sung "I Love You Drops" to Smith. She had originally asked Anderson to release her own version as a single, but he declined and instead made his own single version.

Two tracks on the album had been made commercially-successful for other artists. Ray Price had originally reached number one on the country chart in 1958 with "City Lights". Brenda Lee had reached the top 30 of the Hot 100 in 1963 with "My Whole World Is Falling Down". Two of the album's cuts had previously appeared on Anderson's own projects. "In Case You Ever Change Your Mind" and "Cincinnati, Ohio" first appeared on Anderson's 1964 Showcase LP. "On and On and On", "It Comes and Goes" and "It's Not the End of Everything" were new recordings. "That's What Lonesome Is" was first pitched to Jean Shepard.

== Release and reception ==
Professional ratings
Review scores
Source	Rating
Allmusic	3/5 stars

Connie Smith Sings Bill Anderson was originally released in May 1967 on the RCA Victor label. It was first distributed as a vinyl LP, containing six songs on either side of the record. Decades later, the album was re-issued to digital and streaming sites including Apple Music. The disc spent 17 weeks on America's Billboard Top Country Albums chart, climbing to the number 11 position by August 1967. It was Smith's second LP to chart outside the top ten. The record received positive reception from Billboard magazine in June 1967: "Connie Smith honors Bill Anderson's songs and her renditions do them honor." The magazine concluded by stating that Smith has an "imitable style" while keeping "Anderson's lyric intent". Years later, AllMusic rated the album three out of five stars. The project's only single was Smith's version of "Cincinnati, Ohio", which was released by RCA Victor in June 1967. It became Smith's ninth top ten single on the Billboard Hot Country Songs chart, climbing to the number four position by August 1967.

== Track listings ==
All songs composed by Bill Anderson, except where noted.

=== Vinyl version ===
Side one
No.	Title	Writer(s)	Length
1.	"It Comes and Goes"		1:54
2.	"I Love You Drops"		2:43
3.	"City Lights"		2:35
4.	"Cincinnati, Ohio"		2:09
5.	"It' Not the End of Everything"		2:35
6.	"My Whole World Is Falling Down"	Bill Anderson; Jerry Crutchfield	2:26

Side two
No.	Title	Length
1.	"Easy Come – Easy Go"	1:52
2.	"That's What Lonesome Is"	2:40
3.	"Walk Out Backwards"	2:35
4.	"In Case You Ever Change Your Mind"	2:20
5.	"On and on and On"	2:18
6.	"That's What It's Like to Be Lonesome"	2:45

=== Digital version ===
Connie Smith Sings Bill Anderson (download and streaming)
No.	Title	Writer(s)	Length
1.	"It Comes and Goes"		1:56
2.	"I Love You Drops"		2:45
3.	"City Lights"		2:37
4.	"Cincinnati, Ohio"		2:11
5.	"It' Not the End of Everything"		2:39
6.	"My Whole World Is Falling Down"	Anderson; Crutchfield	2:29
7.	"Easy Come – Easy Go"		1:54
8.	"That's What Lonesome Is"		2:41
9.	"Walk Out Backwards"		2:35
10.	"In Case You Ever Change Your Mind"		2:20
11.	"On and on and On"		2:17
12.	"That's What It's Like to Be Lonesome"		2:48

== Personnel ==
All credits are adapted from the liner notes of Connie Smith Sings Bill Anderson and the biography booklet by Colin Escott titled Born to Sing.

Musical personnel

- Brenton Banks – violin
- Byron Bach – cello
- Howard Carpenter – viola
- Dorothy Dillard – background vocals
- Ray Edenton – guitar
- Dolores Edgin – background vocals
- Solie Fott – viola
- Buddy Harman – drums
- Lillian Hunt – violin
- Roy Huskey – bass
- Shelly Kurland – violin
- Martin Katahn – viola
- John Kline – viola
- Piere Menard – violin
- Wayne Moss – bass guitar, guitar
- Weldon Myrick – steel guitar
- Priscilla Hubbard – background vocals
- Dean Porter – guitar
- Harold Ragsdale – harpsichord, vibes
- Hargus "Pig" Robbins – piano
- Connie Smith – lead vocals
- Leo Taylor – drums
- Gary Vanosdale – viola
- Pete Wade – guitar
- Bill Walker – vibes
- Lamar Watkins – guitar
- William Wright – background vocals
- Harvey Wolfe – cello

Technical personnel

- Bob Ferguson – producer
- Jim Malloy – engineer
- Bill Walker – conductor, contractor

== Chart performance ==
Chart (1967)	Peak position
US Top Country Albums (Billboard)	11

== Release history ==
Region	Date	Format	Label	Ref.
North America	May 1967	Vinyl	RCA Victor Records	
North America	2010s	Music download; streaming	Sony Music Entertainment	
