= Connie Smith Sings Great Sacred Songs =

Studio album by Connie Smith
- Released: June 1966
- Recorded: February 24–28, 1966
- Studio: RCA Studio B
- Genres: Country; gospel
- Length: 29:06
- Label: RCA Victor
- Producer: Bob Ferguson

Connie Smith chronology
Miss Smith Goes to Nashville (1966)	Connie Smith Sings Great Sacred Songs (1966)	Born to Sing (1966)

Connie Smith Sings Great Sacred Songs is the fourth studio album by American country singer Connie Smith. It was released in June 1966 by RCA Victor and contained 12 tracks. It was also her first collection of gospel songs. The project included covers of popular gospel selections including "Father Along" and "Just a Closer Walk with Thee". The disc reached the top 20 of Billboard country albums chart in 1966.

== Background, recording and content ==
Connie Smith launched her career in 1964 with her debut single called "Once a Day", which topped the American country songs chart for eight weeks. With three commercially-successful country music albums, Smith went into RCA Studio B in February 1966 to record her first album of gospel songs. The album was named Connie Smith Sings Great Sacred Songs because Smith wanted to avoid recording songs with gospel-style piano. "The way it turned out was country songs with sacred words and that's why it's called 'Great Sacred Songs'," she told author Colin Escott. Later in her career, Smith would become more religious and record more gospel material. Reflecting on her first gospel project, Smith said, "At that point I'd say I believed in God, but I was not a Christian."

The project was recorded between February 24 and February 28, 1966 with producer Bob Ferguson. A total of twelve tracks comprised the album. The album mainly included covers of gospel selections and hymns. Among these songs was "I Saw a Man", which originally appeared on Johnny Cash's 1959 LP Hymns by Johnny Cash. Also included was Ferguson's self-penned "Wings of a Dove". According to writer Colin Escott, Smith was "the first to sing all three verses" of the song. Also included on the album were the original gospel hymns "Just a Closer Walk with Thee" and "Wayfaring Pilgrim".

== Release and reception ==
Professional ratings
Review scores
Source	Rating
Allmusic	4/5 stars

Connie Smith Sings Great Sacred Songs was originally released in June 1966 on RCA Victor Records. It was Smith's fourth studio album issued in her career. The disc was first issued as a vinyl LP containing six songs on either side of the record. Decades later, the album was re-issued to digital and streaming sites such as Apple Music. Following its original release, the disc spent 12 weeks on the Billboard magazine Country LP's and peaked at number 19 in October 1966. The album was received positively by Billboard magazine who commented, "The spirit is with her when she does these sides, some of which have Jake Hess and the Imperials, big sellers in the religious field." AllMusic rated the album four out of five possible stars.

== Track listings ==
=== Vinyl version ===
Side one
No.	Title	Writer(s)	Length
1.	"Satisfied"	Martha Carson	2:12
2.	"When God Dips His Love in My Heart"	Cleavant Derricks; W.S. Stevenson	2:19
3.	"Farther Along"	Jesse R. Baxter; W.B. Stevens	2:45
4.	"Where Could I Go But to the Lord"	James B. Coats	2:17
5.	"I Wouldn't Take Nothing for My Journey Now"	Jimmie Davis; Charles R. Goodman	1:51
6.	"I Saw a Man"	Arthur Q. Smith	2:42

Side two
No.	Title	Writer(s)	Length
1.	"Wayfaring Pilgrim"	Traditional	3:19
2.	"In the Garden"	Robert Hebble; Austin C. Miles	2:41
3.	"Wings of a Dove"	Bob Ferguson	1:52
4.	"Keep on Holding to Those Nail Scarred Hands"	Henry Slaughter	2:21
5.	"He Set Me Free"	Albert E. Brumley	2:09
6.	"Just a Closer Walk with Thee"	Traditional	2:38

=== Digital version ===
Sings Great Sacred Songs (download and streaming)
No.	Title	Writer(s)	Length
1.	"Satisfied"	Carson	2:12
2.	"When God Dips His Love in My Heart"	Derricks; Stevenson	2:19
3.	"Farther Along"	Baxter; Stevens	2:45
4.	"Where Could I Go But to the Lord"	James B. Coats	2:17
5.	"I Wouldn't Take Nothing for My Journey Now"	Davis; Goodman	1:51
6.	"I Saw a Man"	Arthur Q. Smith	2:42
7.	"Wayfaring Pilgrim"	Traditional	3:19
8.	"In the Garden"	Hebble; Miles	2:41
9.	"Wings of a Dove"	Bob Ferguson	1:52
10.	"Keep on Holding to Those Nail Scarred Hands"	Henry Slaughter	2:21
11.	"He Set Me Free"	Brumley	2:09
12.	"Just a Closer Walk with Thee"	Traditional	2:38

== Personnel ==
All credits are adapted from the liner notes of Connie Smith Sings Great Sacred Songs.

Musical personnel

- Willie Ackerman – drums
- Anita Carter – background vocals
- Ray Edenton – guitar
- Dolores Edgin – background vocals
- Jake Hess – background vocals
- Roy Huskey – bass
- Millie Kirkham – background vocals
- Jimmy Lance – guitar
- Gary McSpadden – background vocals
- Leonard Miller – drums
- Armond Morales – background vocals
- Weldon Myrick – steel guitar
- Charles Nelsen – background vocals
- Dean Porter – guitar
- Hargus "Pig" Robbins – piano
- Henry Slaughter – harpsichord
- Connie Smith – lead vocals
- Jerry Smith – organ, vibes
- Gordon Stokey – background vocals
- Pete Wade – guitar
- Raymond Walker – background vocals

== Chart performance ==
Chart (1966)	Peak position
US Top Country Albums (Billboard)	19

== Release history ==
Region	Date	Format	Label	Ref.
North America	June 1966	Vinyl	RCA Victor Records	
North America	2010s	Music download; streaming	Sony Music Entertainment	
