= Miss Smith Goes to Nashville =

Studio album by Connie Smith
- Released: March 1966
- Recorded: March 17 – November 2, 1965
- Studio: RCA Studio B
- Genre: Country
- Length: 29:26
- Label: RCA Victor
- Producer: Bob Ferguson

Connie Smith chronology
Cute 'n' Country (1965)	Miss Smith Goes to Nashville (1966)	Connie Smith Sings Great Sacred Songs (1966)

Singles from Miss Smith Goes to Nashville
- 1. "If I Talk to Him" Released: August 1965; 2. "Nobody But a Fool (Would Love You)" Released: January 1966

Miss Smith Goes to Nashville is the third studio album by American country singer Connie Smith. It was released in March 1966 by RCA Victor and contained 12 tracks. The album contained original material including several tracks penned by Smith's mentor Bill Anderson. Miss Smith Goes to Nashville reached number two on the country LP's chart in 1966 and included the top five singles "Nobody But a Fool (Would Love You)" and "If I Talk to Him".

== Background ==
In 1964, Connie Smith's debut single titled "Once a Day" reached number one on the American country songs chart for eight weeks. The song propelled Smith's career and would be followed by a series of top ten country singles during the decade. RCA Victor had issued two studio albums of Smith's material prior to the release of Miss Smith Goes to Nashville. Smith and producer Bob Ferguson began the process of creating her next album project in August 1965. Ferguson named the album Miss Smith Goes to Nashville after the Jimmy Stewart film Mr. Smith Goes to Washington.

== Recording and content ==
Miss Smith Goes to Nashville was recorded at RCA Studio B, located in Nashville, Tennessee. All sessions were produced by Bob Ferguson and took place between March 17 and November 2, 1965. The album contained a total of 12 tracks. Smith's future record producer, Ray Baker, brought a demo of the song "If You Won't Tell" by songwriter Dallas Frazier. Smith liked the track and recorded it for the project. She has since recorded more than 50 songs by Frazier. Singer and musician Jerry Reed pitched Smith the track "If I Talk to Him". The song had been co-written by his wife Priscilla Mitchell. Ferguson believed the song had potential to be a single and had Smith include it on the album.

Three tracks composed by Bill Anderson also appeared on the record, including the single "Nobody But a Fool (Would Love You)". Anderson had originally discovered Smith and composed "Once a Day" for her. Miss Smith Goes to Nashville also featured Smith's first self-penned track called "I'll Never Get Over Loving You". "I'd had a publisher tell me it wasn't good enough to record, but then I played it for Bob Ferguson and he liked it well enough," Smith said of the self-composed song.

== Release and chart performance ==
Professional ratings
Review scores
Source	Rating
Allmusic	4.5/5 stars

Miss Smith Goes to Nashville was originally released in March 1966 on the RCA Victor label. It was the third studio offering of Smith's career. The album was originally distributed as a vinyl LP, containing six songs on both sides of the record. Decades later, the original LP was re-issued to digital and streaming markets including Apple Music. In its original release, Miss Smith Goes to Nashville spent 20 weeks on the Billboard Country LP's chart, peaking at number two in May 1966. The disc included two singles. "If I Talk to Him" was first released as a single by RCA Victor in August 1965. The song climbed to the number four position on the Billboard Hot Country Songs chart in November 1965. It was followed by "Nobody But a Fool (Would Love You)" in January 1966. The single also reached number four on the country songs chart. The album was given four out of five stars from AllMusic.

== Track listings ==
=== Vinyl version ===
Side one
No.	Title	Writer(s)	Length
1.	"In My Baby's Arms Again"	Dallas Frazier; Arthur Leo Owens	2:32
2.	"Go Ahead and Make Me Cry"	Leslie Lyle	2:48
3.	"Same as Mine"	Marge Barton	2:12
4.	"If I Talk to Him"	Dolores Edgin; Priscilla Mitchell	2:25
5.	"Ain't Nothin' Shakin' (But the Leaves)"	Frazier; Owens	1:55
6.	"I Don't Have Anyplace to Go"	Bill Anderson	2:25

Side two
No.	Title	Writer(s)	Length
1.	"I'll Never Get Over Loving You"	Connie Smith	2:38
2.	"Holdin' On"	Lee Emerson	2:12
3.	"Nobody But a Fool (Would Love You)"	Bill Anderson	2:29
4.	"For Better or for Worse"	Anderson; Moneen Carpenter	2:35
5.	"Will the Real Me Please Stop Crying"	Bob Tubert	2:36
6.	"If You Won't Tell"	Frazier	2:39

=== Digital version ===
Miss Smith Goes to Nashville (download and streaming)
No.	Title	Writer(s)	Length
1.	"In My Baby's Arms Again"	Frazier; Owens	2:35
2.	"Go Ahead and Make Me Cry"	Lyle	2:50
3.	"Same as Mine"	Barton	2:16
4.	"If I Talk to Him"	Edgin; Mitchell	2:28
5.	"Ain't Nothin' Shakin' (But the Leaves)"	Frazier; Owens	1:58
6.	"I Don't Have Anyplace to Go"	Anderson	2:28
7.	"I'll Never Get Over Loving You"	Smith	2:41
8.	"Holdin' On"	Emerson	2:15
9.	"Nobody But a Fool (Would Love You)"	Anderson	2:31
10.	"For Better or for Worse"	Anderson; Carpenter	2:39
11.	"Will the Real Me Please Stop Crying"	Tubert	2:33
12.	"If You Won't Tell"	Frazier	2:38

== Personnel ==
All credits are adapted from the liner notes of Miss Smith Goes to Nashville.

Musical personnel

- Kenneth Buttrey – drums
- Dorothy Dillard – background vocals
- Ray Edenton – guitar
- Dolores Edgin – background vocals
- Walter Haynes – bass guitar, guitar
- Kelso Herston – guitar
- Priscilla Hubbard – background vocals
- Roy Huskey – bass
- Millie Kirkham – background vocals
- Jimmy Lance – guitar
- Leonard Miller – drums
- Weldon Myrick – steel guitar
- Louis Nunley – background vocals
- Jerry Reed – guitar
- Hargus "Pig" Robbins – piano
- Connie Smith – lead vocals
- Gordon Stoker – background vocals
- Henry Strzelecki – bass
- Ray Walker – background vocals
- William Wright – background vocals

Technical personnel

- Bob Ferguson – Producer
- Al Pachucki – Engineer

== Chart performance ==
Chart (1966)	Peak position
US Top Country Albums (Billboard)	2

== Release history ==
Region	Date	Format	Label	Ref.
North America	March 1966	Vinyl	RCA Victor Records	
North America	2010s	Music download; streaming	Sony Music Entertainment	
