= Downtown Country =

Studio album by Connie Smith
- Released: January 1967
- Recorded: August 25 – October 27, 1966
- Studio: RCA Studio A (Nashville, Tennessee)
- Genre: Country; Nashville Sound
- Length: 31:01
- Label: RCA Victor
- Producer: Bob Ferguson

Connie Smith chronology
Born to Sing (1966)	Downtown Country (1967)	Connie in the Country (1967)

Singles from Downtown Country
- 1. "The Hurtin's All Over" Released: September 1966

Downtown Country is the sixth studio album by American country singer Connie Smith. It was released in January 1967 by RCA Victor. Downtown Country was the second of Smith's albums to include string instrumentation to help create a pop-influenced sound. The album also featured the single "The Hurtin's All Over", which reached the top five of the Billboard country chart. The album itself reached the top five of Country LP's chart following its initial release.

== Background ==
Connie Smith first reached a commercial breakthrough with 1964's "Once a Day", which topped the country songs chart for eight weeks. It brought several more follow-up singles into the top five including "If I Talk to Him" (1965) and "Then and Only Then" (1965). RCA Victor producers Chet Atkins and Bob Ferguson (the former was Smith's producer) saw opportunities in crossover pop music. This prompted the pair to encourage several artists to record softer pop material, including Smith. Bob Ferguson arranged for conductor Bill Walker to create a string section that would be included on Smith's recording sessions. Together, they would craft 1966's Born to Sing and 1967's Downtown Country. It was Ferguson's idea to name the album, basing his decision on the album's pop production. "I thought it would be an expansion move," he told writer Colin Escott. The cover for the album was shot at the Madison Square Shopping Center in Gallatin, Tennessee.

== Recording and content ==
Smith entered the studio to record the sessions for Downtown Country between August 25 and October 27, 1966. The sessions were produced by Bob Ferguson and conducted by Bill Walker. The sessions were held at RCA Studio A located in Nashville, Tennessee. Smith was used to recording at the smaller RCA Studio B and recalled being upset about recording at the much larger Studio A. "In Studio B I could judge from the walls what my voice was doing. I controlled it by what I heard and what I felt in the room. The singer loses control in the big studio and the studio takes over." The album was Smith's second to include a string section, backed by violins and violas. Downtown Country consisted of 12 tracks. Five of the tracks were original recordings, including "The Hurtin's All Over", "It'll Be Easy" and "Your Mem'ry Comes Along". The remaining selections were cover versions of pop songs: Petula Clark's "Downtown", Dean Martin's "Everybody Loves Somebody", Connie Francis's "My Heart Has a Mind of Its Own" and Bobby Vee's "The Night Has a Thousand Eyes".

== Release and reception ==
Professional ratings
Review scores
Source	Rating
Allmusic	4/5 stars

Downtown Country was originally released in January 1967 on the RCA Victor label. It marked the sixth studio collection of Smith's career. The disc was issued as a vinyl LP, containing six songs on both sides of the record. Decades later, the album was reissued to digital and streaming sites including Apple Music. At the time of its original release, Downtown Country spent 15 weeks on the Billboard magazine Country LP's chart, peaking at the number five position in April 1967. It was Smith's fifth studio disc to chart in the top five. Billboard magazine reviewed the project and gave it a positive response. Reviewers called Smith's covers "Downtown" and "My Heart Has a Mind of Its Own" as "exceptional". They described her reading of Sandy Posey's "Born a Woman" to be a "powerful rendition". The album was later rated four out of five stars from Allmusic. The album's only single was the track "The Hurtin's All Over", which was issued by RCA Victor in September 1966. The single peaked at number three on the Billboard Hot Country Songs chart in December 1966.

== Track listings ==
=== Vinyl version ===
Side one
No.	Title	Writer(s)	Length
1.	"Ride, Ride, Ride"	Liz Anderson	1:47
2.	"Downtown"	Tony Hatch	2:50
3.	"It's Now or Never"	Wally Gold; Aaron Schroeder	3:13
4.	"Born a Woman"	Martha Sharp	2:28
5.	"Everybody Loves Somebody"	Ken Lane; Irving Taylor	2:53
6.	"The Night Has a Thousand Eyes"	Marilyn Garret; Dorothy Wayne; Ben Weisman	2:27

Side two
No.	Title	Writer(s)	Length
1.	"It's Gonna Rain Today"	Dallas Frazier	2:32
2.	"My Heart Has a Mind of Its Own"	Howard Greenfield; Jack Keller	2:29
3.	"The Hurtin's All Over"	Harlan Howard	2:45
4.	"Your Mem'ry Comes Along"	Paul Tannen; Johnny Tillotson	2:08
5.	"It'll Be Easy"	Jan Crutchfield	2:35
6.	"My Own Peculiar Way"	Willie Nelson	2:54

=== Digital version ===
Downtown Country (download and streaming)
No.	Title	Writer(s)	Length
1.	"Ride, Ride, Ride"	Anderson	1:49
2.	"Downtown"	Hatch	2:53
3.	"It's Now or Never"	Gold; Schroeder	3:18
4.	"Born a Woman"	Sharp	2:30
5.	"Everybody Loves Somebody"	Lane; Taylor	2:57
6.	"The Night Has a Thousand Eyes"	Garret; Wayne; Weisman	2:31
7.	"It's Gonna Rain Today"	Frazier	2:33
8.	"My Heart Has a Mind of Its Own"	Greenfield; Keller	2:32
9.	"The Hurtin's All Over"	Howard	2:50
10.	"Your Mem'ry Comes Along"	Tannen; Tillotson	2:10
11.	"It'll Be Easy"	Crutchfield	2:38
12.	"My Own Peculiar Way"	Nelson	2:58

== Personnel ==
All credits are adapted from the liner notes of Downtown Country and the biography booklet by Colin Escott titled Born to Sing.

Musical personnel

- Brenton Banks – violin
- Byron Bach – cello
- Howard Carpenter – viola
- Jerry Carrigan – drums
- Dorothy Dillard – background vocals
- Ray Edenton – guitar
- Dolores Edgin – background vocals
- Solie Fott – viola
- Buddy Harman – drums
- Lillian Hunt – violin
- Roy Huskey – bass
- Shelly Kurland – violin
- Martin Katahn – viola
- Pierre Menard – violin
- Wayne Moss – bass guitar, guitar
- Weldon Myrick – steel guitar
- Priscilla Hubbard – background vocals
- Dean Porter – guitar
- Harold Ragsdale – harpsichord, vibes
- Hargus "Pig" Robbins – piano
- Connie Smith – lead vocals
- Leo Taylor – drums
- Gary Vanosdale – viola
- Pete Wade – guitar
- Bill Walker – harpsichord
- Lamar Watkins – guitar
- William Wright – background vocals
- Harvey Wolfe – cello

Technical personnel

- Bob Ferguson – Producer
- Bill Walker – Contractor

== Chart performance ==
Chart (1967)	Peak position
US Top Country Albums (Billboard)	5

== Release history ==
Region	Date	Format	Label	Ref.
North America	January 1967	Vinyl	RCA Victor Records	
North America	2010s	Music download; streaming	Sony Music Entertainment	
