= Cry, Cry, Cry (Connie Smith song) =

Single by Connie Smith

from the album Connie in the Country
- B-side: "The Hurt Goes On"
- Released: September 1968
- Genre: Country
- Label: RCA Camden
- Songwriter(s): Shirley Wood
- Producer(s): Bob Ferguson

Connie Smith singles chronology
"Run Away Little Tears" (1968)	"Cry, Cry, Cry" (1968)	"Ribbon of Darkness" (1969)

"Cry, Cry, Cry" is a single by American country music artist Connie Smith. Released in September 1968, the song reached #20 on the Billboard Hot Country Singles chart. The single was later released on Smith's 1968 album entitled Connie in the Country. The song became Smith's first single to peak outside the top ten.

== Chart performance ==
Chart (1968)	Peak position
U.S. Billboard Hot Country Singles	20
