= I'll Come Runnin' (Connie Smith song) =

Single by Connie Smith

from the album The Best of Connie Smith
- B-side: "It's Now or Never"
- Released: February 1967
- Genre: Country
- Label: RCA Victor
- Songwriter(s): Connie Smith
- Producer(s): Bob Ferguson

Connie Smith singles chronology
"The Hurtin's All Over" (1966)	"I'll Come Runnin'" (1967)	"Cincinnati, Ohio" (1967)

"I'll Come Runnin" is a single by American country music artist Connie Smith. Released in February 1967, the song reached #10 on the Billboard Hot Country Singles chart. The single was later released on Smith's first compilation album The Best of Connie Smith (1967). "I'll Come Runnin'" was the first single written entirely by Smith herself.

== Chart performance ==
Chart (1967)	Peak position
U.S. Billboard Hot Country Singles	10
