= Connie Smith =

American country music artist (born 1941)

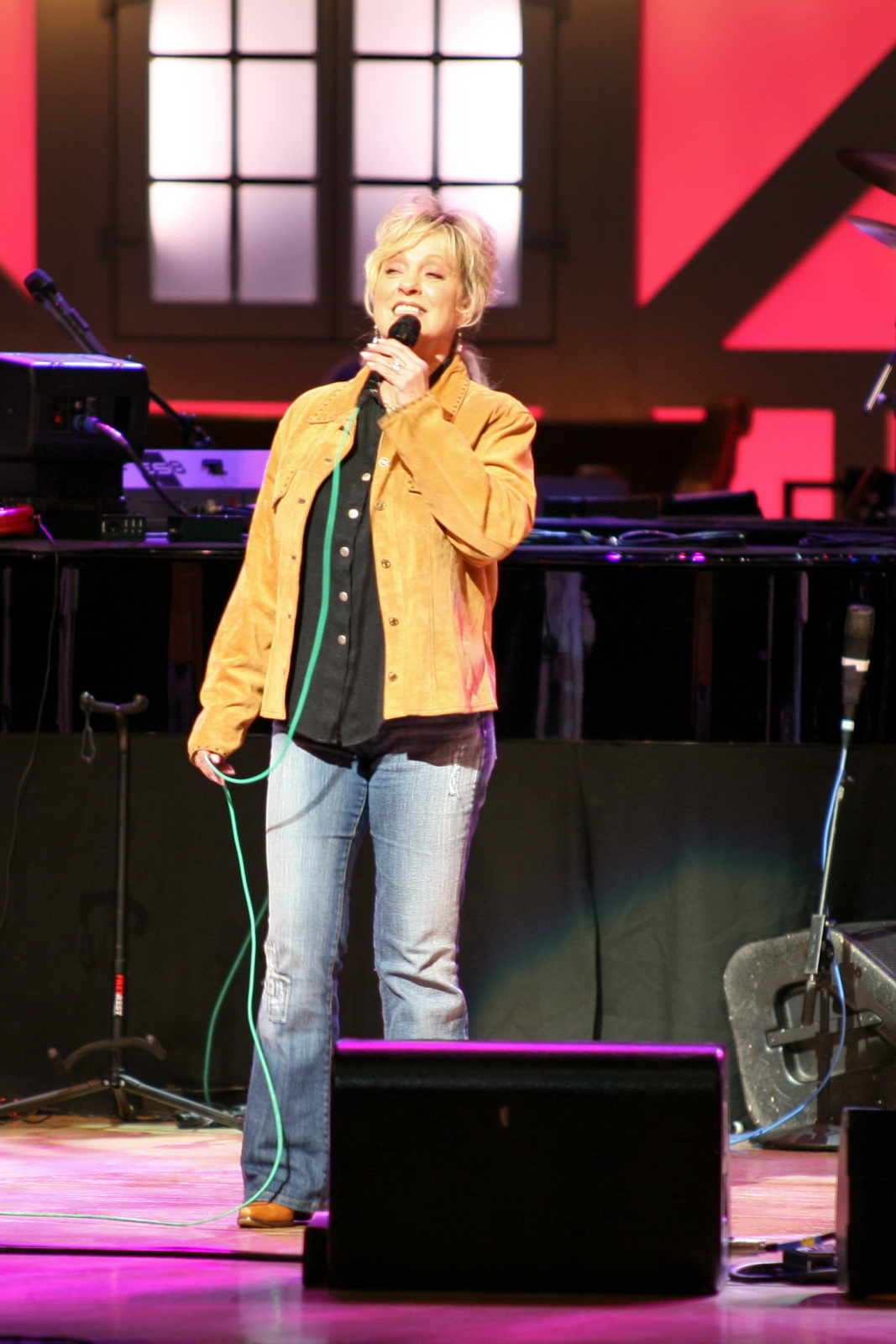
- Smith performing live at the Grand Ole Opry in 2007
- Born: Constance June Meador; August 14, 1941 (age 85); Elkhart, Indiana, U.S.
- Occupations: Singer; songwriter
- Years active: 1964–present
- Known for: "Once a Day"
- Spouses: Jerry Smith (m. 1961; div. 1966); Jack Watkins (m. 1966; div. 1967); Marshall Haynes (m. 1972; div. 1992); Marty Stuart (m. 1997)
- Children: 5
- Musical career
- Genres: Country; Nashville sound; gospel
- Instruments: Vocals; guitar
- Labels: RCA Victor; Columbia; Monument; Epic; Warner Bros.; Daywind; Sugar Hill; Fat Possum

Constance June Stuart (née Meador; born August 14, 1941), known professionally as Connie Smith, is an American country music singer and songwriter. Her contralto vocals have been described by music writers as significant and influential to the women of country music.

Discovered in 1963, Smith signed with RCA Victor Records the following year and remained with the label until 1973. Her debut single "Once a Day" was nominated at the Grammy Awards for Best Female Country Vocal Performance and reached number one on the Billboard Hot Country Songs chart in November 1964 and remained at the top position for eight weeks. In 1991, Trisha Yearwood's debut single went to number one for two weeks, but Smith still held the record for the most number of weeks at number one by any female country artist in history. Taylor Swift's "We Are Never Ever Getting Back Together" broke Smith's 48-year record in 2012. Smith's success continued through 1960s and mid-1970s, with 19 more top-10 hits (including "Then and Only Then", "Ain't Had No Lovin'", "Cincinnati, Ohio", "I Never Once Stopped Loving You", and "Ain't Love a Good Thing") on the country songs chart.

In the early 1970s, Smith began to record gospel music more frequently as she became more serious in her Christianity. As she focused more heavily on religion, Smith became known for her outspoken religious demeanor at concerts and music venues. At the same time, she spent more time raising her five children than focusing on music. She eventually went into semiretirement in 1979 and returned to recording briefly in the mid-1980s with Epic Records. In the 1990s, though, she returned to music permanently with her collaboration with Marty Stuart. Their musical friendship became romantic, leading to their marriage in 1997, and to Connie Smith, her first studio album in 20 years. Critically acclaimed, Smith began performing again and has recorded two more studio albums.

Smith has been nominated for 11 Grammy Awards, including eight nominations for Best Female Country Vocal Performance. She has also been nominated for one Academy of Country Music award and three Country Music Association awards. Rolling Stone included her on its list of the 100 greatest country music artists and CMT ranked her among the top 10 in its list of the 40 greatest women of country music. She has been a member of the Grand Ole Opry cast since 1965. In 2012, Smith was inducted into the Country Music Hall of Fame.

== Early life ==
Constance June Meador was born to Wilma and Hobart Meador in Elkhart, Indiana. Her parents were originally from West Virginia, and the family returned there when Smith was five months old. They later moved to Dungannon, Ohio. Her biological father was an abusive alcoholic. "There were some tough times that I went through as a young child," she told an interviewer. Wilma Meador eventually divorced Hobart Meador and remarried to Tom Clark, who brought eight children into the marriage to join Meador's five; the couple had two children, totaling 15 children.

Smith was influenced by music in her childhood. Her stepfather played mandolin, one brother played fiddle, and another brother played guitar. On Saturday nights, the family tuned into the Grand Ole Opry radio broadcast. She took up the guitar following a lawnmower accident that nearly cut off her leg. While she was recovering in the hospital, she was given a guitar and learned how to play different chords. Smith did not perform publicly until high school, when a friend invited her to sing Connie Francis's pop hit "My Happiness".

With only one-tenth of a point behind the valedictorian, Smith graduated from Salem-Liberty High School in 1959 as the class salutatorian. Following graduation, she worked as telephone operator in Lowell, Ohio. She also worked in a grocery store, as a drugstore clerk, and as a dental assistant. At the age of 19, she married her first husband, Jerry Smith, who encouraged her singing, and she began performing with more frequency. Her first professional performance was at the 1962 Washington County Fair. She then briefly joined the cast of Saturday Night Jamboree, a local country-music television program, but was fired after her first performance, later theorizing it was because she was pregnant. She then successfully auditioned for and landed a spot on a similar program for WSAZ-TV.

Despite performance opportunities, Smith intended to remain a homemaker and mother. In August 1963, Smith entered a talent contest at the Frontier Ranch country music park near Columbus, Ohio. Performing Jean Shepard's "I Thought of You", she won the talent contest and five silver dollars. Judging the contest was country singer-songwriter Bill Anderson, who was instantly impressed by her voice. "At first I thought they were playing a record and she was lip sync'ing it," he later explained.

In January 1964, Smith ran into Anderson again at a country-music package concert in Canton, Ohio. He invited her to perform with him on Ernest Tubb's Midnite Jamboree program in Nashville, Tennessee. When Smith performed on the program in March 1964, she found out that she would not be performing with Anderson, but with Tubb. Impressed by her performance, Loretta Lynn introduced herself after the show and gave her career advice. After performing on the program, Smith returned to Nashville that May to make demonstration records by Anderson that he planned on pitching to other country artists. Anderson's manager, Hubert Long, brought the demo to the RCA Victor label, where producer Chet Atkins heard it. Also impressed by her vocals, Atkins offered Smith a recording contract, and she signed on June 24, 1964.

== Career ==
=== 1964–1967: "Once a Day" and peak success ===
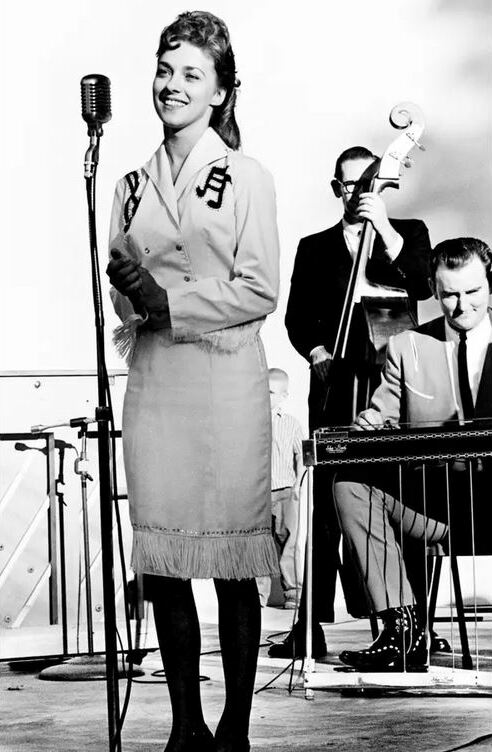
Smith performed for a crowd of 5,000 people, August 1964.

After signing Smith to RCA, Atkins found himself too busy with other artists. Instead, he enlisted Bob Ferguson to act as Smith's producer. The pair developed a close professional relationship, and Ferguson remained her producer until she departed from RCA. "I couldn't have asked for a better person to work with. He is one of the finest men I've ever known," Smith later said. Smith's first session took place on July 16, 1964, where she recorded four songs. Three of these tracks were written by Bill Anderson, who agreed to write material for Smith. Two days later, Smith made her debut on the Grand Ole Opry. One of the four songs recorded on July 16 was "Once a Day", which was chosen to be Smith's debut single. "Once a Day" was released in August 1964 and reached number one on the Billboard Hot Country Singles chart on November 28. It remained at the number-one position for eight weeks in late 1964 and early 1965. "Once a Day" became the first debut single by a female country artist to reach number one. For nearly 50 years, the single held the record for the most weeks spent at number one on the Billboard country chart by a female artist.

Smith started performing more regularly with "Once a Day"'s success. Bill Anderson briefly served as her manager, but was replaced by Charlie Lamb. Smith made her first network-television appearance in October 1964 on ABC's The Jimmy Dean Show. In March 1965, RCA Victor released her self-titled debut album It also reached the number-one spot, spending a total of seven weeks at the top of the Billboard Top Country Albums chart. Dan Cooper of Allmusic gave the disc a positive reception and described Smith as "a down-home Streisand fronting the Lennon Sisters."

Bill Anderson fulfilled his promise to RCA Victor and continued writing Smith's next single releases. Producer Bob Ferguson and steel guitar player Weldon Myrick created a "high" and "punchy" production that Ferguson thought would sound pleasing on car radios. "I thought it was an awfully thin sound, but it wound up being very popular," Myrick recalled. In 1965, RCA issued Smith's follow-up single written by Anderson titled "Then and Only Then", which reached number four on the Billboard country songs chart. It was followed by another Anderson-written top-10 single titled "I Can't Remember". In October 1965, the latter song appeared on Cute 'n' Country, Smith's second studio album. Although she disliked the name of the LP, it became her second disc to top the Billboard country albums chart. She had additional top-five Billboard country singles through early 1966 with Anderson's "Nobody But a Fool (Would Love You)" and Priscilla Mitchell's "If I Talk to Him". In 1965, Smith became a member of the Grand Ole Opry.

In 1966, Ferguson felt pressured from RCA headquarters to market Smith's sound toward "middle-of-the-road" country pop material. Smith was against the pop production, but nevertheless agreed to try it. The pair did several sessions featuring a string instrumentation. The style appeared on her next studio releases Born to Sing (1966) and Downtown Country (1967). Both albums featured full orchestras in the background and cover versions of singles by pop artists of the time. Featured on the LPs were the singles "Ain't Had No Lovin'" and "The Hurtin's All Over", which both reached the Billboard country top five. During this time, Smith appeared in several country music vehicle films, where she performed many of her current hit recordings. In 1966, she appeared in the films Second Fiddle to a Steel Guitar and The Las Vegas Hillbillys, the latter of which starred Jayne Mansfield. In 1967, she appeared in The Road to Nashville and Hell on Wheels. Smith's touring schedule also increased. In 1966, she formed her own touring band named the Sundowners and later married the band's guitar player, Jack Watkins.

In February 1967, RCA's subsidiary budget label Camden released Smith's next studio LP titled Connie in the Country. The LP included covers of popular country recordings of the era and "Cry, Cry, Cry", a single by Smith that reached the top 20. In May 1967, RCA released an album of songs written solely by Bill Anderson titled Connie Smith Sings Bill Anderson. Smith later commented, "it was an honor, not a favor" to record an album of all Anderson tunes. It included covers of Anderson's hits such as "City Lights" and "That's What It's Like to Be Lonesome". Included on the album was "Cincinnati, Ohio", which Smith released as a single and brought the song to the Billboard country top five. Its success later inspired the city of Cincinnati to declare its own Connie Smith Day in June 1967. Smith remained at her commercial zenith through 1967 with a continued series of top-10 recordings. Her further hits included the "I'll Come Runnin'", "Burning a Hole in My Mind", "Baby's Back Again", and "Run Away Little Tears". Three of these recordings were included on Smith's 1967 album I Love Charley Brown, which reached the country LPs top 20.

=== 1968–1972: Setbacks, gospel music and continued country music success ===
By 1968, Smith had reached the height of her career. She was making multiple appearances on film and television, while attempting to balance touring with family life. The pressures of various responsibilities stressed Smith to a point where she nearly left her career. In 1968, she discovered Christianity, which brought solace to her personal and professional life. Ultimately, she chose to continue with her career and recorded for RCA every few months, but she reduced her touring schedule. She devoted the remainder of her time to family life and made efforts to appear on more Christian music programs. She worked alongside ministers Billy Graham and Rex Humbard. She also appeared on several Christian television shows.

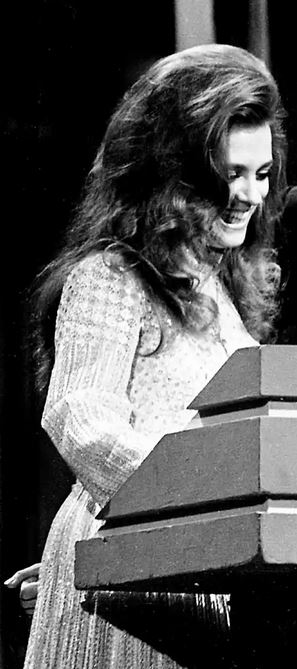
Smith presenting "Instrumentalist of the Year" at the 1972 Country Music Association Awards

With Smith's commitment to RCA, the label continued releasing new albums and singles with regularity. With her new religious convictions, Smith also prioritized including gospel recordings on her secular albums. This remained a theme throughout her career. In 1968 and 1969, RCA Victor released the studio LPs Sunshine and Rain, Back in Baby's Arms, and Connie's Country. These recordings yielded a cover of Marty Robbins's hit Ribbon of Darkness, a song written by Canadian singer/songwriter Gordon Lightfoot. Smith's version reached the top 20 of the Billboard country singles chart. In Canada, "Ribbon of Darkness" became her first song to top their RPM Country chart. Entering the 1970s, Smith made the top 10 of the North American country charts with less frequency, but continued having commercial success. The singles "You and Your Sweet Love" and "I Never Once Stopped Loving You" (both written by Bill Anderson) made the Billboard country top 10 in 1970. Her 15th studio LP of the same name was released in 1970 and made the top 20 of the Billboard country albums chart.

During this period, Smith also teamed with country singer-songwriter Nat Stuckey to record two duet studio albums. The idea was crafted by Smith's producer (Bob Ferguson) and Stuckey's producer (Felton Jarvis). Both men thought the artists' voices would "blend well". The duo's first duet sessions produced a cover of Sonny James's "Young Love", which reached the top 20 of the Billboard country songs chart. Their first album of the same name featured covers of country and pop songs of the era. In an effort for Smith to record more gospel music, the duo cut a spiritual-themed LP in 1970 titled Sunday Morning with Nat Stuckey and Connie Smith. Christian radio programs often opened their shows with the duo's gospel music, which influenced RCA to release "If God Is Dead (Who's That Living in My Soul)" as a single in 1970. The song peaked in the lower reaches of the Billboard country chart.

Journalists and writers took notice of Smith's RCA work following 1968. Biographer and writer Barry Mazor found that Smith's recordings had "a new delicacy of phrasing that shows itself". Mazor also found her albums to have more distinctive qualities, calling 1970's I Never Once Stopped Loving You to be "one of her most consistent and strongest albums". AllMusic's Stephen Thomas Erlewine praised Smith's recordings from 1968 to 1972, highlighting the strength of her vocals: "She may have been given some of the best songs, but the thing is, she deserved them; few others could give them grace and soul, as this always entertaining box amply proves." Authors Mary A. Bufwack and Robert K. Oermann commented that her later RCA singles "stand the test of time as among the most powerful country female vocal performances of the 1970s."

In the early 1970s, Smith started recording more songs penned by Dallas Frazier. The pair had become close friends, which prompted Frazier to write songs for Smith that reflected situations in her personal life. Both Smith and Frazier described her 1970 single "Where Is My Castle" as being autobiographical of her recent marital troubles. "Anybody knows that its cathartic to sing how you feel about things," Smith later said. "Where Is My Castle" reached the top 20 of both the Billboard and RPM country singles charts. In 1971, RCA released Smith's cover of Don Gibson's "Just One Time". Backed by a large rhythm section, the recording reached number two on the Billboard and RPM country charts, becoming her most commercially successful single of the 1970s. Her 18th studio LP of the same name reached number 14 on the Billboard country albums chart and featured liner notes written by Loretta Lynn.

With Smith being among RCA's top-selling recording artists, she had enough leverage to coax executives to let her record another gospel album. The result was 1971's Come Along and Walk with Me. The studio album featured gospel tracks written by spiritual writers such as Dottie Rambo. In 1972, Smith had three back-to-back top singles on the Billboard country chart: "Just for What I Am", "If It Ain't Love (Let's Leave It Alone)", and "Love Is the Look You're Looking For". RCA released the singles on three separate LPs: Ain't We Havin' Us a Good Time (1972), If It Ain't Love and Other Great Dallas Frazier Songs (1972), and Love Is the Look You're Looking For (1973). Her most commercially successful album was If It Ain't Love and Other Great Dallas Frazier Songs, which reached number 14 on the Billboard country albums chart. The studio project was recorded as a tribute to Dallas Frazier and featured 10 songs written by him. Frazier also sang several duets with Smith on the project. Before leaving her contract with RCA, the label released more LPs, including the compilation Dream Painter (1973). Its title track charted in the Billboard top 40.

=== 1973–1979: Record label switches, pop music incorporation and semi-retirement ===
In 1973, RCA promised to give Smith a better royalty and more creative control if she renewed her contract. In an updated contract, these terms were not met. Upon hiring a lawyer, she left RCA and was offered a contract by Columbia Records. In 1973, Smith signed a new recording contract with Columbia. The label gave her more creative control, including the opportunity to record one gospel album per year. At Columbia, she met with Clive Davis, who agreed to produce her work, but the label dismissed Davis before they could work together. Instead, producer Billy Sherrill chose to work with Smith. A disagreement about religion, though, ended the pairing before it began. She started recording alongside producer George Richey, who recently had success writing material for George Jones and Tammy Wynette.

At Columbia, Smith was pressured into recording with more pop production than before. "From Day One at the new label, even more than before, it was a constant tussle, because I just am who I am," recalled Smith. She remained active in song selection and the recording process. Smith's first Columbia LP titled A Lady Named Smith (1973) included pop production such as string instrumentation and overdubbed background vocals. The LP reached number 31 on the Billboard country albums chart. Richey agreed to release "Ain't Love a Good Thing" as her first Columbia single. Instead, the Richey-Smith co-written song "You've Got Me (Right Where You Want Me)" proved to be the first label single. The decision disappointed Smith enough that she chose to end their professional relationship. The last Richey-produced project was Smith's first Columbia gospel LP, titled God Is Abundant. The album of religious material climbed to number 20 on the Billboard country albums chart.

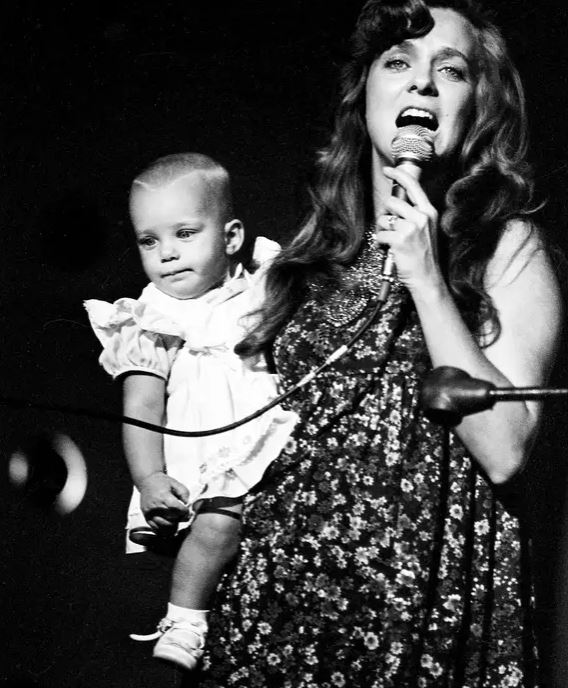
Smith performed on the Grand Ole Opry with her daughter on her arm, 1974.

Smith chose Ray Baker to serve as her next producer. Baker had operated a publishing company and produced several song demos that prompted Smith to choose him. The pair had a more agreeable relationship and recorded together throughout the decade. Baker produced Smith's next Columbia album, titled That's the Way Love Goes (1974). The LP featured several original recordings and cover tunes. The album included "Ain't Love a Good Thing", which was released as a single and became her 18th top-10 song on the Billboard country chart. Although she recorded two gospel projects in 1974, the label waited until 1975 to release both LPs. Instead, Columbia released a secular project titled I Never Knew (What That Song Meant Before) (1974). Its title track became a top-20 Billboard country single, peaking at number 13. It was followed in 1975 by the traditional country LP I Got a Lot of Hurtin' Done Today/I've Got My Baby On My Mind. Both "I've Got My Baby on My Mind" and Smith's cover of Hank Williams's "Why Don't You Love Me" reached the country top 20.

Music critics noticed a change in Smith's vocals following her Columbia switch. When reviewing the compilation, Connie Smith Sings Her Hits, Thom Jurek of Allmusic commented that she lost the "grain" in her voice: "It could be said, that regardless of the material, she never made a bad record; the tunes were carefully chosen, it's true, but she never tried to hide the hardcore twang in her vocal style." Smith's biographer, Barry Mazor, found her voice to "lower in range by this point" and saw evidence of Columbia attempting to "push her recorded vocal into the upper end of her range". Other critics noticed stylistic changes, but observed no change in her singing. NPR's Ken Tucker found her recordings in this era to feature more pop instrumentation, but did not "obscure the passion and pain she communicated so fearlessly".

In 1975, Columbia released both of her 1974 gospel projects. The first was Connie Smith Sings Hank Williams Gospel. For the album, Smith and Baker went through the Hank Williams catalog, where they came across a series of never-before-released gospel songs. The result was the first album of Hank Williams gospel material recorded by another artist. In 1976, the project was nominated by the Grammy Awards for Best Gospel Performance. The second 1975 religious LP was the gospel-influenced Christmas album titled Joy to the World. In 1976, Columbia issued two more country albums of Smith's material: The Song We Fell in Love To and I Don't Wanna Talk It Over Anymore. Both LPs peaked in the Billboard country albums top 40. The albums included the number-13 country single "I Don't Wanna Talk It Over Anymore" and her 20th top 10, a remake of the Everly Brothers's "(Till) I Kissed You". The latter was Smith's second single to top Canada's RPM country chart.

In 1977, Smith moved to Fred Foster's Nashville label Monument Records. She was pressured into recording more country pop material than before and was given singing lessons by a songwriter. "He [Fred Foster] wanted to mold me into something that I wasn't comfortable with," Smith commented. "That's why that never worked." AllMusic's Stephen Thomas Erlewine found her Monument music to have "state-of-the-art production that dates instantly, walks the line between crossover pop and country-pop rather clumsily, and lacks good material." Monument released two LPs of Smith's material between 1977 and 1978. Her only commercially successful Monument single was a cover of Andy Gibb's "I Just Want to Be Your Everything". The single climbed to number 14 on the Billboard country chart. Yet, her other Monument releases reached progressively lower positions on the country chart between 1978 and 1979. Furthermore, Smith had five children by this point and felt pressured to be at home with her family. Ultimately, Smith decided to leave her country music career entirely to focus on raising her children and tending to her religious needs.

=== 1983–2003: Semi-retirement and return to music ===
For three years, Smith remained in semi-retirement, committing only to occasional performances at the Grand Ole Opry, where she remained a member. At the Opry, she only performed gospel songs. She decided to return to her career, though, in 1983. She resigned with Monument Records, but left after the label filed for bankruptcy. Instead, singer and songwriter Ricky Skaggs helped her secure a new recording contract with Epic Records. The first single, "A Far Cry from You" (1985), was written by alternative country artist Steve Earle. It reached number 71 on the Hot Country Songs chart.

One day in the mid-1990s, Smith was at her home talking to one of her daughters on the phone. After telling her mother what she was going to do that night, her daughter asked Smith what her plans for that night were. Because she did not have anything fun planned, Smith lied so her daughter would not have to worry about her. After the conversation ended, Smith realized that she did not need her own children worrying about her at the start of their adult lives, and decided that it was time to return to her career. With country artist Marty Stuart (whom she later married in 1997) acting as the album's main producer, Smith signed a recording contract with Warner Bros. Records in 1996. Although the label preferred her to record an album of duets, Smith decided to go by her own terms and record a solo studio album. In October 1998, she released her second self-titled studio album. It consisted of 10 tracks, nine of them co-written by Stuart and her.

Smith's 1998 project attracted limited commercial attention, but was given critical praise for its traditional and contemporary style. Kurt Wolff, in the book Country Music: The Rough Guide, commented that the album sounded "far gutsier than anything in the Reba and Garth mainstream". Thom Jurek of Allmusic gave the release four out of five stars, calling it "a solid effort" and commenting, "it stands head and shoulders over most of the stuff that's come out of Nash Vegas in over a decade. Even if it doesn't sell a copy, it's a triumphant return for Smith. She hasn't lost a whit of her gift as a singer or as a writer." Also in 1998, Smith made a second cameo appearance in a film, portraying a "Singer at the Rodeo Dance" in The Hi-Lo Country starring Woody Harrelson and Billy Crudup.

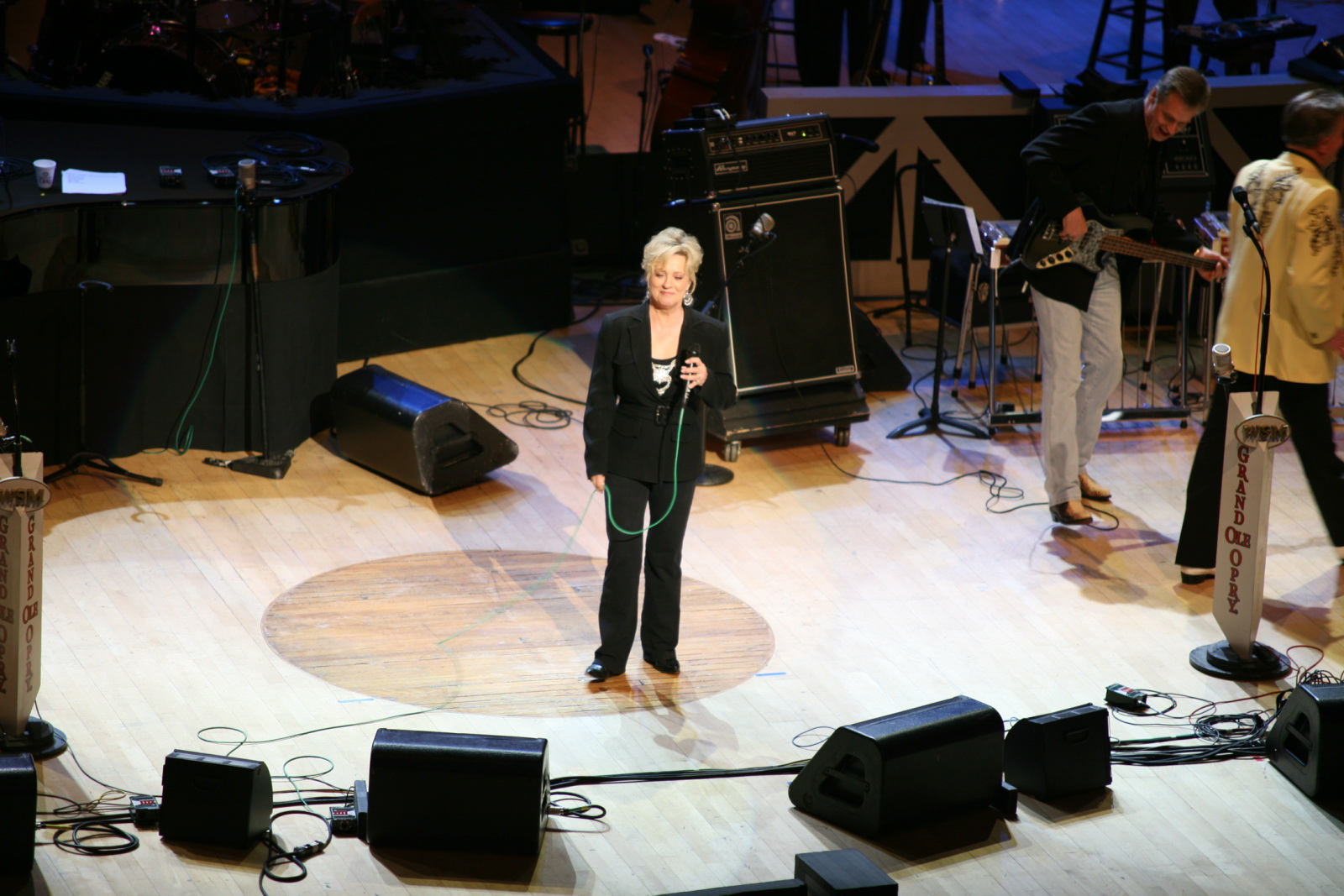
Smith on stage at the Grand Ole Opry

In August 2003, she released a gospel album with country artists Barbara Fairchild and Sharon White titled Love Never Fails on Daywind Records. In an interview with Country Stars Central, Smith said that she was ill with the stomach flu while recording the album, but still enjoyed making the record. Produced by country and bluegrass performer Ricky Skaggs (White's husband), the album received a nomination from the Dove Awards. Website Slipcue.com reviewed the release and stated, "[Love Never Fails] is probably too rowdy for most Southern gospel fans (who really like tinkly pianos and less-twangy vocals), and while it probably won't wow many country listeners, for folks who are fans any of these three singers, this is kind of a treat".

=== 2004–present: The Marty Stuart Show and new music releases ===
In November 2008, Smith joined the cast of Marty Stuart's television series The Marty Stuart Show, which aired on the RFD-TV network every Saturday night. The 30-minute program featured traditional country music performed by both Stuart and Smith, as well as radio personality Eddie Stubbs. The show stopped airing on RFD-TV in 2014. In August 2011, Smith released her first new solo recording in 13 years, titled Long Line of Heartaches, via Sugar Hill Records. The record was produced by Marty Stuart and included five songs written by the pair. Harlan Howard, Kostas, Johnny Russell, and Dallas Frazier also wrote tracks that were included on the disc. The album was reviewed positively by AllMusic's Steve Leggett, who gave it four stars. "It wouldn't be quite right to call this a throwback album, but it does sound like vintage traditional country given just a bit of a polished edge," he concluded. Andrew Mueller of BBC also gave it a positive response, calling it "classic and classicist country songs".

In August 2021, Smith's next studio album was released on the Fat Possum label titled The Cry of the Heart. It was the third project produced by Stuart and her first album of new material in 10 years. The New York Times described The Cry of the Heart as evoking traditional styles that "recall Smith's '60s-era recordings". It was Smith's first album since 1976 to reach a charting position on Billboard, peaking on the Current Album Sales chart following its release. PopMatters gave the album an 8/10 rating and concluded: "If you wanted to understand what traditional country is, you could go to the same place today as you could have 50 years ago: a Connie Smith record." In April 2024, the Fat Possum label surprise-released Smith's next studio project, Love, Prison, Wisdom and Heartaches. Although an album of covers, Smith herself did not describe it that way: "I'm singing on behalf of my friends. Hoping to share them while passing along their songs."

== Personal life ==
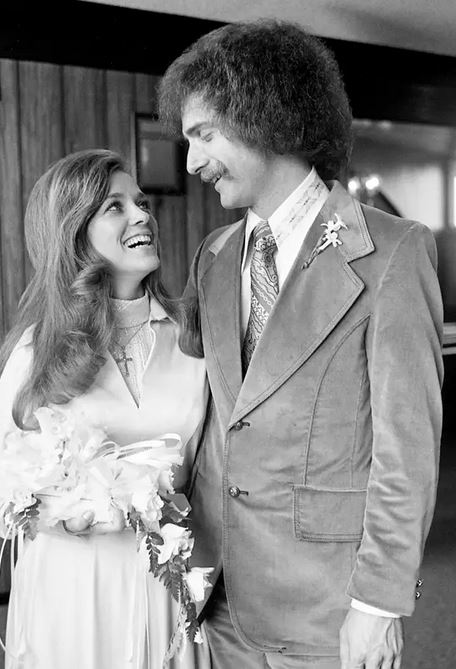
Smith on the day of her wedding to third husband, Marshall Haynes, 1972

Smith has been married four times. In 1961, she married Jerry Smith, a ferro-analyst at the Inter-Lake Iron Corporation in Beverly, Ohio. They had one child together, born on March 9, 1963, named Darren Justin. (In the late 1970s, Darren went to Europe to become a missionary; he is currently a psychologist.) In the mid-1960s, the couple divorced and Smith married the guitarist in her touring band, Jack Watkins. They had a son before separating nearly a year after marrying. Shortly afterward, Smith married telephone repairman Marshall Haynes. In the early 1970s, Haynes frequently toured with Connie on her road show. The couple had three daughters.

After divorcing Haynes in the early 1990s, Smith stated that she never would marry again. However, on July 8, 1997, she married for the fourth time, this time to her producer, country artist Marty Stuart, who began producing her after writing songs for Smith's 1998 comeback album. Stuart described encountering Smith 26 years earlier, after attending her concert: "I met Connie when I was 12 years old. She came to the Indian reservation in my hometown of Philadelphia, Mississippi, to work at a fair. She hasn't changed a bit. She looked great then and she looks great now." Stuart said he told his mother then that he was going to marry Connie Smith. Smith explains how they have sustained their marriage : "Make the Lord the center...and commit."

Smith revealed in a New York Times interview that she had been diagnosed with COVID-19 in February 2021. She was hospitalized, developing sepsis and pneumonia. She eventually made a full recovery. "They asked me if my heart stopped, did I want to be revived, and I said, 'Of course, I don't want to be a COVID statistic,'" she told the Nashville Scene.

== Musical styles and vocal ability ==
Connie Smith's sound is defined by the Nashville sound musical style, primarily during her breakthrough years in the 1960s. While most Nashville sound recordings of the time mainly included full orchestras, Smith's sound remained more traditional with its use of steel guitar and her twangy vocals, while still featuring some pop-influenced instrumentation to provide urban pop appeal. Critics have largely praised Smith's use of the steel guitar, which have often been described as "sharp" and "prominent". Her steel guitar player Weldon Myrick is often credited with creating what Smith has called "The Connie Smith Sound". In an interview with Colin Escott in his book Born to Sing, Myrick recalls how Smith's producer (Bob Ferguson) wanted the guitar to sound: "He came out and said he wanted a bright sound, and he adjusted my controls. I thought it was an awfully thin sound, but it wound up being very popular."

Smith's vocal delivery has also been considered to be part of her musical style. Writer Stephen Thomas Erlewine noted in 2012 that Smith sings with a "cool, authoritative ease, a skill that brought her to the attention of some of Nashville's finest songwriters." Mary A. Bufwack and Robert K. Oermann called her singing "a pillar-of-fire delivery sobbed with desolation." Thom Jurek of AllMusic stated that Smith's vocals offer "sophisticated emotional delivery" and that "her control and phrasing remain a high-water mark today."

== Legacy and honors ==
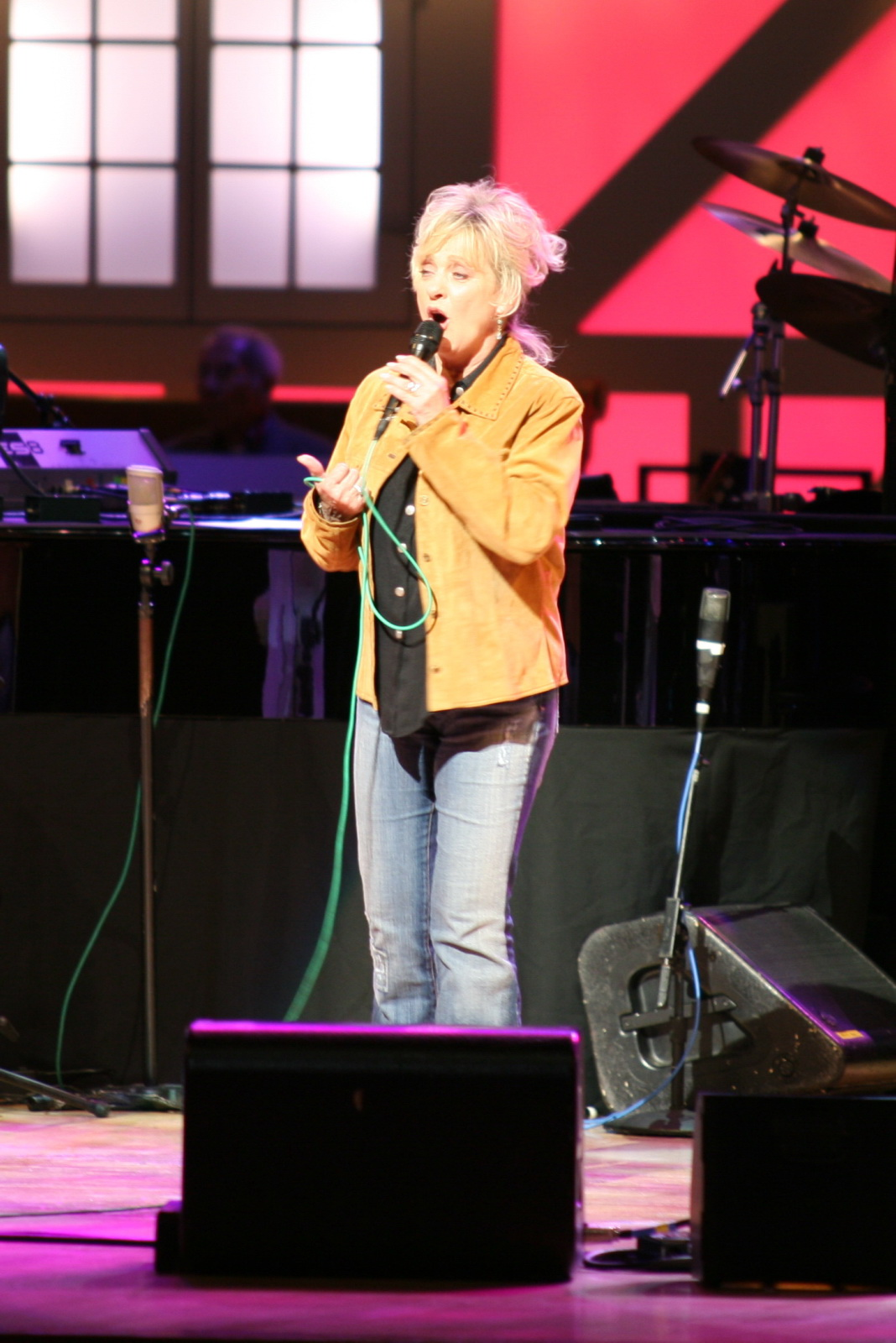
Smith at the Grand Ole Opry, 2007

Smith is considered by many critics and historians to be one of country music's more celebrated and respected artists. In his review of Smith's 1996 compilation The Essential Connie Smith, Jurek explained why Smith's vocals are usually compared to Cline's: "Connie Smith is perhaps the only female singer in the history of country music who can truly claim to be the heiress to Patsy Cline's throne. It's not that there aren't many amazing vocalists in the field, and plenty of legends among them. But in terms of the pure gift of interpretation of taking virtually any song and making it a country song of class and distinction, Smith is it."

Writers and journalists have also cited Smith as an integral piece of country-music history. Mary A. Bufwack and Robert K. Oermann categorized her as one of country's "heroines of heartbreak" due to her emotional vocal delivery. Bufwack and Oermann further stated that, along with Tammy Wynette, Smith was among the genre's "most towering country voices of the 1960s and 1970s", who "sang from the depths of despair" and "spoke for conservative Middle America in both music and life."

Many artists in the country-music industry have cited Smith as a significant musical influence or one of their favorite musical artists. George Jones cited Smith as his favorite female singer in his 1995 autobiography. Elvis Presley had many of Smith's albums in his record collection at his Graceland home and intended to record Smith's version of "The Wonders You Perform" but never got around to doing so. In a discussion with country songwriter Fred Foster, Dolly Parton famously said: "You know, there's really only three female singers in the world: Barbra Streisand, Linda Ronstadt, and Connie Smith. The rest of us are only pretending."

Smith has been given honors and achievements as part of her legacy. In 2002, she was ranked in the top 10 on CMT's televised special of the 40 Greatest Women of Country Music. In 2011, she was inducted into the West Virginia Music Hall of Fame. Alongside Garth Brooks, Smith was inducted into the Country Music Hall of Fame in 2012. "Just to be in the company of the great Kitty Wells is enough," she commented after hearing the news. In 2015, she celebrated 50 years as a member of the Grand Ole Opry radio broadcast. Her celebration was honored in a performance joined by Alison Krauss and Mel Tillis, among others. In 2017, she was ranked on Rolling Stone's list of the "100 Greatest Country Artists of All Time".

In March 2021, Smith's legacy was further cemented by the Library of Congress, which added "Once a Day" to the National Recording Registry. In April 2021, Smith's husband, Marty Stuart, announced a documentary to be released about her life and career titled Connie: The Cry of the Heart. "Studying the depth of what Marty and Connie have achieved in the industry and then discovering their ability to predict the business trends around their legacy makes me very excited to be part of what they are doing," said Nick Kontonicolas, who will help broadcast the documentary on his network.

== Discography ==
Studio albums

- Connie Smith (1965)
- Cute 'n' Country (1965)
- Miss Smith Goes to Nashville (1966)
- Connie Smith Sings Great Sacred Songs (1966)
- Born to Sing (1966)
- Downtown Country (1967)
- Connie in the Country (1967)
- Connie Smith Sings Bill Anderson (1967)
- Soul of Country Music (1967)
- I Love Charley Brown (1968)
- Sunshine and Rain (1968)
- Connie's Country (1969)
- Young Love (with Nat Stuckey) (1969)
- Back in Baby's Arms (1969)
- Sunday Morning with Nat Stuckey and Connie Smith (with Nat Stuckey) (1970)
- I Never Once Stopped Loving You (1970)
- Where Is My Castle (1971)
- Just One Time (1971)
- Come Along and Walk with Me (1971)
- Ain't We Havin' Us a Good Time (1972)
- If It Ain't Love and Other Great Dallas Frazier Songs (1972)
- A Lady Named Smith (1973)
- God Is Abundant (1973)
- That's the Way Love Goes (1974)
- I Never Knew (What That Song Meant Before) (1974)
- I Got a Lot of Hurtin' Done Today/I've Got My Baby On My Mind (1975)
- Connie Smith Sings Hank Williams Gospel (1975)
- Joy to the World (1975)
- The Song We Fell in Love To (1976)
- I Don't Wanna Talk It Over Anymore (1976)
- Pure Connie Smith (1977)
- New Horizons (1978)
- The Best of Connie Smith (1989)
- By Request (1995)
- Clinging to a Saving Hand (1995)
- Connie Smith (1998)
- Love Never Fails (with Barbara Fairchild and Sharon White) (2003)
- Long Line of Heartaches (2011)
- The Cry of the Heart (2021)
- Love, Prison, Wisdom and Heartaches (2024)

== Filmography ==
Year	Title	Role	Notes	Ref.
1966	The Las Vegas Hillbillys	Herself	cameo	
1966	Second Fiddle to a Steel Guitar	Herself	cameo	
1967	The Road to Nashville	Herself	cameo	
1967	Hell on Wheels	Herself	cameo	
1998	The Hi-Lo Country	Singer at rodeo dance		
2008–2014	The Marty Stuart Show	Herself	153 episodes	

== Awards, nominations and honors ==
Year	Nominee / work	Award	Result	Ref.
1964	Billboard Magazine	Most Promising Female Country Artist	Won	
1965	Grammy Awards	Best Country and Western Single – "Once a Day"	Nominated	
1965	Grammy Awards	Best New Country and Western Artist	Nominated	
1965	Grammy Awards	Best Country & Western Vocal Performance, Female – "Once a Day"	Nominated	
1965	Billboard Magazine	Most Promising Female Country Artist	Won	
1965	Billboard Magazine	Favorite Female Country Performer	Nominated	
1965	Billboard Magazine	Favorite Album (1964–1965) – Connie Smith	Nominated	
1965	Cash Box	Most Promising Female Country Vocalist	Won	
1965	Country Music Review	Most Promising Female Singer	Won	
1966	Grammy Awards	Best Sacred Recording – Connie Smith Sings Great Sacred Songs	Nominated	
1966	Grammy Awards	Best Country and Western Vocal Performance, Female – "Ain't Had No Lovin'"	Nominated	
1966	Billboard Magazine	Favorite Female Country Performer	Nominated	
1966	Billboard Magazine	Favorite Country Album – Cute 'n' Country	Nominated	
1966	Cash Box	Most Programmed Female Artist	Won	
1966	Country Music Life Award	Favorite Female Artist	Won	
1966	Record World	Top Female Vocalist	Won	
1966	Record World	Most Outstanding Female Country and Western Vocalist	Won	
1967	Billboard Magazine	Top Country Artist, Female Vocalist	Nominated	
1967	Cash Box	Most Programmed Female Artist	Nominated	
1967	Record World	Top Female Vocalist	Nominated	
1967	Country Music Association Awards	Female Vocalist of the Year	Nominated	
1968	Grammy Awards	Best Country & Western Solo Vocal Performance, Female – "Cincinnati, Ohio"	Nominated	
1969	Academy of Country Music	Top Female Vocalist	Nominated	
1969	Grammy Awards	Best Country Vocal Performance, Female – "Ribbon of Darkness"	Nominated	
1970	Country Music Association	Female Vocalist of the Year	Nominated	
1970	Record World	Top Female Vocalist	Nominated	
1971	Grammy Awards	Best Sacred Performance – "Whispering Hope" (with Nat Stuckey)	Nominated	
1972	Music City News Awards	Top Female Vocalist	Nominated	
1972	Country Music Association	Female Vocalist of the Year	Nominated	
1974	Grammy Awards	Best Inspirational Performance – "All the Praises"	Nominated	
1974	Music City News Awards	Top Female Vocalist	Nominated	
1975	Music City News Awards	Top Female Vocalist	Nominated	
1976	Grammy Awards	Best Gospel Performance – Connie Smith Sings Hank Williams Gospel	Nominated	
1979	Music City News Awards	Gospel Group/Act of the Year	Won	
2002	Country Music Television	40 Greatest Women of Country Music	Won	
2007	Country Universe	100 Greatest Women – Rank (number 24)	Won	
2010	Grammy Awards	Best Country Collaboration with Vocals – "Run to You" (with Marty Stuart)	Nominated	
2011	West Virginia Music Hall of Fame	Inducted	Won	
2012	Country Music Association	Country Music Hall of Fame induction	Won	
2017	Rolling Stone	100 Greatest Country Artists of All Time – Rank (number 69)	Won	
