= Nobody but a Fool (Would Love You) =

"Nobody But a Fool (Would Love You)"

Single by Connie Smith

from the album Miss Smith Goes to Nashville
- B-side: "I'll Never Get Over Loving You"
- Released: January 1966
- Recorded: October 14, 1965
- Genre: Country, Nashville sound
- Length: 2:30
- Label: RCA Victor
- Songwriter: Bill Anderson
- Producer: Bob Ferguson

Connie Smith singles chronology
"If I Talk to Him" (1965)	"Nobody But a Fool (Would Love You)" (1966)	"Ain't Had No Lovin'" (1966)

"Nobody But a Fool (Would Love You)" is a song written by Bill Anderson and released as a single by American country artist Connie Smith. It was the second single spawned from her 1966 album Miss Smith Goes to Nashville and was produced by Bob Ferguson. The single was released in January 1966 by RCA Victor and peaked within the Top 5 on the Billboard Magazine country music singles chart, becoming her fifth Top 10 hit in a row.

== Background and content ==
"Nobody But a Fool (Would Love You)" was the fourth single Smith recorded by Bill Anderson. The song was recorded October 14, 1965 along with the songs, "Same as Mine", "I'll Never Get Over Loving You", and "Holdin' On". The recording sessions featured The Nashville A-Team of musicians, including Hargus "Pig" Robbins, Kenneth Buttrey, and Walter Haynes. The song's lyrics describes how a woman is angered how her lover has cheated on her and she angrily says back to him, "nobody but a fool would love you". The song's chorus further describes the setting and situation:

Nobody but a fool would love you after the way you done me
Broke ev'ry vow you made me broke ev'ry rule
Who'd lie awake all night cry till you were out of sight
Lovin' you with all of her might nobody but a fool

"Nobody But a Fool (Would Love You)" has been covered by other artists. In June 1966 country artist Kitty Wells recorded the song for her 1966 album, Country All the Way. In August 1966, Traditional Pop artist Dean Martin recorded a version of the song as well. Smith also is featured performing guitar on the background of the song. "Nobody But a Fool (Would Love You)" was reviewed by About.com and was given a positive review. The website considered the song to have an "interesting melody" and the tempo to be "brisk". It later states, "Although it has a fast beat, the words are very sad. Nothing is like having your heart ripped open and feeling like you will never love again, but Connie makes it sound easy." No review was provided by other websites.

== Chart performance ==
"Nobody But a Fool (Would Love You)" was Connie Smith's fifth single released. It was issued in January 1966 and debuted on the charts shortly afterward, becoming a Top 10 hit, peaking at #4 on the Billboard Magazine Hot Country Songs chart later in the year. It became Smith's fifth Top 10 hit in a row and also her fourth Top 10 hit written by Bill Anderson. It would be a series of Top 10 country hits in a row between 1964 and 1968.

=== Charts ===
Chart (1966)	Peak position
U.S. Billboard Hot Country Songs	4
