= Ain't Had No Lovin' =

Single by Connie Smith

from the album Born to Sing
- B-side: "Five Fingers to Spare"
- Released: May 1966
- Genre: Country
- Label: RCA Victor
- Songwriter(s): Dallas Frazier
- Producer(s): Bob Ferguson

Connie Smith singles chronology
"Nobody But a Fool (Would Love You)" (1966)	"Ain't Had No Lovin'" (1966)	"The Hurtin's All Over" (1966)

"Ain't Had No Lovin'" is a single by American country music artist Connie Smith. Released in May 1966, the song reached #2 on the Billboard Hot Country Singles chart. The single was later issued onto Smith's second album of the year, Born to Sing.

== Chart performance ==
Chart (1966)	Peak position
U.S. Billboard Hot Country Singles	2
