= The Hurtin's All Over =

Single by Connie Smith

from the album Downtown Country
- B-side: "Invisible Tears"
- Released: September 1966
- Genre: Country
- Label: RCA Victor
- Songwriter(s): Harlan Howard
- Producer(s): Bob Ferguson

Connie Smith singles chronology
"Ain't Had No Lovin'" (1966)	"The Hurtin's All Over" (1966)	"I'll Come Runnin'" (1967)

"The Hurtin's All Over" is a single by American country music artist Connie Smith. Released in September 1966, the song reached #3 on the Billboard Hot Country Singles chart. The single was later released on Smith's 1967 album entitled Downtown Country. Wanda Jackson covered the song on her 1968 album Cream of the Crop.

== Chart performance ==
Chart (1966)	Peak position
U.S. Billboard Hot Country Singles	3
