= If I Talk to Him =

Single by Connie Smith

from the album Miss Smith Goes to Nashville
- B-side: "I Don't Have Anyplace to Go"
- Released: August 1965
- Recorded: August 5, 1965
- Genre: Country
- Length: 2:26
- Label: RCA Victor
- Songwriter(s): Dolores Edgin; Priscilla Mitchell
- Producer(s): Bob Ferguson

Connie Smith singles chronology
"I Can't Remember" (1965)	"If I Talk to Him" (1965)	"Nobody But a Fool (Would Love You)" (1966)

"If I Talk to Him" is a song written by Dolores Edgin and Priscilla Mitchell, and released as a single by American country artist Connie Smith. It was produced by Bob Ferguson and released on her 1966 studio album Miss Smith Goes to Nashville. The song was released in August 1965 and reached the Top 5 on the Billboard Magazine country music chart, becoming her fourth Top 10 single. The song was recorded under RCA Victor Records.

== Background and content ==
"If I Talk to Him" was the first single Smith recorded that was not written by Bill Anderson. The song was instead written by Dolores Edgin and Priscilla Mitchell, the latter was the wife country artist Jerry Reed. It was recorded at RCA Victor Studio B on August 5, 1965, along with the songs "I Don't Have Anyplace to Go" and "If You Won't Tell on Me". The recording session was produced by Bob Ferguson, who had previously produced Smith's "Once a Day", "Then and Only Then", and "I Can't Remember" singles. The session featured The Nashville A-Team of musicians, including Jerry Reed, Walter Haynes, Kenneth Buttrey, and Hargus "Pig" Robbins. The song's narrator describes how she fears her former lover will call her phone number and wish to speak to her. To avoid the conversation, the narrator says to tell a friend of hers that she is not home. The song's chorus further explains the storyline:

Yes if I talk to him I take him back again
I'm afraid to even answer the phone
Cause if I talk to him I take him back again
So if he calls please tell him I'm not home

Also included playing the guitar accompaniment to "If I Talk to Him" is Smith herself, who had previously played the guitar on her other single sessions.

== Chart performance ==
"If I Talk to Him" was Connie Smith's fourth single released during the course of her career and third single released in 1965. It was released August becoming a major hit, reaching #4 on the Billboard Magazine Hot Country Songs chart in late 1965. Unlike her previous singles, the song did chart among the Billboard Bubbling Under Hot 100 songs list. "If I Talk to Him" one of a series of singles to reach the Billboard country music Top 10 between 1964 and 1968.

=== Charts ===
Chart (1965)	Peak position
U.S. Billboard Hot Country Songs	4
