= Priscilla Mitchell =

American country music singer (1941–2014)

- Born: September 18, 1941
- Origin: Marietta, Georgia, U.S.
- Died: September 24, 2014 (aged 73); Nashville, Tennessee, U.S.
- Genres: Country
- Occupation: Singer
- Years active: 1965–1968
- Labels: Mercury
- Spouse: Jerry Reed (m. 1959)

Priscilla Mitchell (September 18, 1941 – September 24, 2014) was an American country music singer.

== Biography ==
Priscilla Mitchell began as a rock 'n' roll singer in the 1950s, as well as a background singer for NRC Records, and became most popular as a duet performer when she cut a string of duet recordings, in the 1960s, with country singer Roy Drusky. Drusky and Mitchell recorded a series of hits, their best-selling recordings being country music "cheating songs", including their biggest hit together, "Yes, Mr. Peters", released in 1965, becoming number one on the country charts.

Priscilla graduated from Sprayberry High School in Marietta, Georgia, in 1959.

Priscilla Mitchell was married to country singer, songwriter, actor, and session guitarist Jerry Reed from 1959 until his death on September 1, 2008; together, they had two daughters, Seidina Ann Hubbard, and Charlotte Elaine (Lottie) Zavala, who are also country singers.

The songs "It Comes and Goes" and "I Want That Boy" were also recorded by her under the name "Sadina".

Mitchell died on September 24, 2014, following a short illness, six days after her 73rd birthday. She is survived by her daughters, her sister, and her two grandchildren.

== Discography ==
=== Albums ===
Year	Album	US Country	Label
1965	Love's Eternal Triangle (with Roy Drusky)	—	Mercury
1966	Together Again (with Roy Drusky)	14	Mercury

=== Singles ===
Year	Single	US Country	AUS	Album	
1965	"Yes, Mr. Peters" (with Roy Drusky)	1	51	Love's Eternal Triangle	
1965	"Slippin' Around" (with Roy Drusky)	45	—	Love's Eternal Triangle	
1965	"It Comes and Goes"	—	—	singles only	
1965	"I Want That Boy"	—	—	singles only	singles only
1966	"Sweet Talk"	—	—	singles only	singles only
1966	"Acres of Heartaches"	—	—	singles only	singles only
1967	"I'll Never Tell on You" (with Roy Drusky)	61	—	singles only	singles only
1967	"He's Not for Real"	53	—	singles only	singles only
1968	"Your Old Handy Man"	73	—	singles only	singles only
1968	"Natch'illy Ain't No Good"	—	—		singles only
