= Once a Day =

Single by Connie Smith

from the album Connie Smith
- B-side: "The Threshold"
- Released: August 1, 1964
- Recorded: July 16, 1964
- Studio: RCA Studio B, Nashville
- Genre: Country, Nashville sound
- Length: 2:17
- Label: RCA Victor
- Songwriter: Bill Anderson
- Producer: Bob Ferguson

Connie Smith singles chronology
"Once a Day" (1964)	"Then and Only Then/Tiny Blue Transistor Radio" (1965)

"Once a Day" is a song written by Bill Anderson and recorded as the debut single by American country artist Connie Smith. It was produced by Bob Ferguson for her self-titled debut album. The song was released in August 1964, topping the Billboard country music chart for eight weeks between late 1964 and early 1965. It was the first debut single by a female artist to reach number one on the Billboard Hot Country Songs. This song peaked at number one for the week of November 28, 1964, and it stayed at number one for eight consecutive weeks, a record for a female solo artist for nearly 50 years, until it was surpassed by Taylor Swift's "We Are Never Ever Getting Back Together" in December 2012.

In 2020, "Once a Day" was deemed "culturally, historically, or aesthetically significant" by the Library of Congress and selected for preservation in the National Recording Registry.

== Background and content ==
"Once a Day" was written by American country artist, Bill Anderson, especially for Connie Smith. Originally recorded by Smith as a demo, the song was officially recorded at her first session with RCA Victor Records on July 16, 1964 at Studio B in Nashville, Tennessee. Produced by Bob Ferguson, the session was accompanied by Nashville's "A-Team" of musicians, which included members of Anderson's touring band, The Po' Boys. The song itself describes a woman who has not gotten over her previous lover. Although the woman explains that she has limited her grieving to "once a day," it is later found out that she is grieving, "once a day, every day, all day long."

While also singing lead vocals on "Once a Day," Smith was also featured playing the song's guitar accompaniment. The song was re-recorded by Smith in French and was re-titled, "Pas Souvent." That year the song was released as a single to France, and was released seven years later on Smith's compilation, Love Is the Look You're Looking for in 1973. It was re-recorded for a third time for her 1976 studio album, The Song We Fell in Love To on Columbia Records.

== Chart performance ==
"Once a Day" was released as Connie Smith's debut single under RCA Victor Records. It was rush-released as a single August 1, 1964, and moved quickly up the country music chart. The song became Smith's commercial breakthrough recording, reaching No. 1 on the Billboard Magazine Hot Country Songs chart the week of November 28, and remaining at the top spot for eight weeks until January 16, 1965. This longevity record stood unmatched until December 2012, when "We Are Never Ever Getting Back Together" by Taylor Swift overtook the achievement with nine weeks at No. 1. Despite this success, Smith never topped the Billboard country charts again, and this song became her solo number-one song. She did, however, top the country charts twice more in Canada, with her cover of Gordon Lightfoot's Ribbon of Darkness (1969) and the Everly Brothers' ('Til) I Kissed You (1976).

Smith previously held the record of being the only country female to reach number one with a debut single. Trisha Yearwood equalled Smith's record in 1991 with, "She's in Love with the Boy." After it reached No. 1, "Once a Day" became one of the year's biggest songs and was nominated for Best Country Song from the Grammy Awards.

"Once a Day" made Smith a major star in country music, nominating her for a series of Grammy Awards, including Best Female Country Vocal Performance and Best New Country Artist. It was released on Smith's self-titled debut album in March 1965, which also reached number one. The single helped gain Smith a series of major hits under RCA Victor in the 1960s. Her follow-up single, "Then and Only Then" (released in 1965) reached No. 4 on the Billboard Country Chart, and a series of unbated top ten hits continued until mid-1968, including "If I Talk to Him", "Ain't Had No Lovin'", and "The Hurtin's All Over". Smith had nineteen more top ten singles during her career.

=== Charts ===
Chart (1964–1965)	Peak position
U.S. Billboard Hot Country Songs	1
U.S. Billboard Bubbling Under Hot 100	1

== Cover versions ==
Since the song's release, "Once a Day" has been recorded by over 50 different artists. Such artists as:

- Country artist Loretta Lynn recorded a cover of the song for her 1965 album, Songs from My Heart.
- Also in 1965, David Houston recorded "Once a Day" for his studio album, Twelve Great Country Hits.
- In 1966, R&B vocalist, Timi Yuro released her version as single, which peaked at #118 on the Billboard Bubbling Under chart.
- In 1986, Australian rock band the Triffids recorded "Once a Day" for their album, In the Pines.
- Glen Campbell recorded the song for his 1991 album Unconditional Love.
- In 2006, Van Morrison included a cover on his album Pay the Devil.
