= 1970 in country music =

This is a list of notable events in country music that took place in the year 1970.

== Events ==
- April 13 - Marty Robbins is awarded Artist of the Decade for the 1960s by the Academy of Country Music
- September — That Good Ole Nashville Music debuts in syndication. The series will run until 1985.

=== No Dates ===
Early in the year, Marty Robbins suffers a major heart attack which almost takes the life of the country star.

== Top hits of the year ==
=== Number-one hits ===
==== United States ====
(as certified by Billboard)

Date	Single Name	Artist	Wks. No.1	CAN peak	Spec. Note
January 3	Baby, Baby (I Know You're a Lady)	David Houston	4		^{[B]}
January 31	A Week in a Country Jail	Tom T. Hall	2	32	^{[A]}
February 14	It's Just a Matter of Time	Sonny James	4	4	Cover of Brook Benton hit.
March 14	The Fightin' Side of Me	Merle Haggard	3
April 4	Tennessee Bird Walk	Jack Blanchard & Misty Morgan	2		^{[C]}
April 18	Is Anybody Goin' to San Antone	Charley Pride	2
May 2	My Woman My Woman My Wife	Marty Robbins	1
May 9	The Pool Shark	Dave Dudley	1	4	^{[C]}
May 16	My Love	Sonny James	3	3
June 6	Hello Darlin'	Conway Twitty	4	2	^{[1]}
July 4	He Loves Me All the Way	Tammy Wynette	3	2
July 25	Wonder Could I Live There Anymore	Charley Pride	2
August 8	Don't Keep Me Hangin' On	Sonny James	4	17
September 5	All for the Love of Sunshine	Hank Williams, Jr. with The Mike Curb Congregation	2		^{[A] – Hank Williams, Jr.}^{[C] – The Mike Curb Congregation}
September 19	For the Good Times	Ray Price	1	2
September 26	There Must Be More to Love Than This	Jerry Lee Lewis	2
October 10	Sunday Mornin' Comin' Down	Johnny Cash	2
October 24	Run Woman Run	Tammy Wynette	2
November 7	I Can't Believe That You've Stopped Loving Me	Charley Pride	2
November 21	Fifteen Years Ago	Conway Twitty	1
November 28	Endlessly	Sonny James	3	10
December 19	Coal Miner's Daughter	Loretta Lynn	1
December 26	Rose Garden	Lynn Anderson	5		^{[A]}

Notes

- 1 No. 1 song of the year, as determined by Billboard.
- A First Billboard No. 1 hit for that artist.
- B Last Billboard No. 1 hit for that artist.
- C Only Billboard No. 1 hit for that artist to date.

==== Canada ====
(as certified by RPM)

Date	Single Name	Artist	Wks. No.1	U.S. peak	Spec. Note
January 10	Blistered/See Ruby Fall	Johnny Cash	1	4
January 17	Baby, Baby (I Know You're a Lady)	David Houston	1
January 24	Big in Vegas	Buck Owens	1	5
January 31	Six White Horses	Tommy Cash	2	4	^{[C]}
February 14	Fancy	Bobbie Gentry	2	26	^{[B]}
February 28	Brown Eyed Handsome Man	Waylon Jennings	1	3
March 7	If I Were a Carpenter	Johnny Cash and June Carter Cash	1	2	^{[C] – June Carter Cash}
March 14	Honey Come Back	Glen Campbell	1	2
March 21	Welfare Cadillac	Guy Drake	1	6	^{[C]}
March 28	Wayward Woman of the World	Gary Buck	1	—	^{[B]}
April 4	The Fightin' Side of Me	Merle Haggard	1
April 11	Tennessee Bird Walk	Jack Blanchard & Misty Morgan	1		^{[C]}
April 18	Kentucky Rain	Elvis Presley	1	31	^{[A]}
April 25	My Woman My Woman My Wife	Marty Robbins	2
May 9	Is Anybody Goin' to San Antone	Charley Pride	1
May 16	The Way You Play	Merv Smith	1	—	^{[C]}
May 23	Big Joe Mufferaw	Stompin' Tom Connors	2	—	^{[A]}
June 6	What Is Truth	Johnny Cash	3	3
June 27	Street Singer	Merle Haggard	1	9
July 4	She's a Little Bit Country	George Hamilton IV	3	3
July 25	Ketchup Song	Stompin' Tom Connors	2	—
August 8	Wonder Could I Live There Anymore	Charley Pride	2
August 22	Snowbird	Anne Murray	3	10	^{[A]}
September 12	Everything a Man Could Ever Need	Glen Campbell	1	5
September 19	Me and Bobby McGee	Gordon Lightfoot	1	—	^{[A]}
September 26	Countryfied	Dick Damron	3	—	^{[2]}: Fell to #3 on the week of October 10.
October 10	All for the Love of Sunshine	Hank Williams, Jr.	1		^{[A]}
October 17	Sunday Mornin' Comin' Down	Johnny Cash	1
October 24	There Must Be More to Love Than This	Jerry Lee Lewis	1
October 31	Back Where It's At	George Hamilton IV	1	16
November 7	Run Woman Run	Tammy Wynette	1
November 14	Ode to Suburbia	R. Harlan Smith	1	—	^{[A]}
November 28	The Ballad of Muk Tuk Annie	Jimmy Arthur Ordge	1	—	^{[B]}
December 5	I Can't Believe That You've Stopped Loving Me	Charley Pride	1
December 12	Fifteen Years Ago	Conway Twitty	1
December 19	Coal Miner's Daughter	Loretta Lynn	1
December 26	Sweet Dreams of Yesterday	Hank Smith	1	—	^{[A]}

Notes

- 2 Song dropped from No. 1 and later returned to top spot.
- A First RPM No. 1 hit for that artist.
- B Last RPM No. 1 hit for that artist.
- C Only RPM No. 1 hit for that artist.

=== Other major hits ===
==== Singles released by American artists ====
US	CAN	Single	Artist
6	4	After Closing Time	David Houston and Barbara Mandrell
6	2	All I Have to Do Is Dream	Bobbie Gentry and Glen Campbell
9	12	All My Hard Times	Roy Drusky
16	—	Amos Moses	Jerry Reed
34	11	Angel of the Morning	Connie Eaton
4	21	Angels Don't Lie	Jim Reeves
12	—	Another Lonely Night	Jean Shepard
23	9	Big Mama's Medicine Show	Buddy Alan
27	18	Big Wheel Cannonball	Dick Curless
10	19	Biloxi	Kenny Price
10	2	Carmella	Marty Robbins
29	3	Carolina in My Mind	George Hamilton IV
16	10	Charlie Brown	The Compton Brothers
8	14	Commercial Affection	Mel Tillis
7	16	Country Girl	Jeannie C. Riley
19	—	Cowboy Convention	Buddy Alan and Don Rich
7	12	Daddy Was an Old Time Preacher Man	Porter Wagoner and Dolly Parton
20	—	Do It to Someone You Love	Norro Wilson
13	—	Don't Cry Daddy	Elvis Presley
17	31	Don't Take All Your Loving	Don Gibson
37	8	Down in the Boondocks	Penny DeHaven
21	13	Duty Not Desire	Jeannie C. Riley
16	—	Georgia Sunshine	Jerry Reed
5	8	Goin' Steady	Faron Young
41	9	Gotta Get to Oklahoma ('Cause California's Gettin' to Me)	The Hagers
8	9	The Great White Horse	Buck Owens and Susan Raye
15	—	He'd Still Love Me	Lynn Anderson
3	5	Heart Over Mind	Mel Tillis
5	3	Heaven Everyday	Mel Tillis
11	6	Heavenly Sunshine	Ferlin Husky
26	4	Hello I'm a Jukebox	George Kent
14	9	Hello Mary Lou	Bobby Lewis
3	22	How I Got to Memphis	Bobby Bare
20	46	How I Love Them Old Songs	Carl Smith
5	24	Humphrey the Camel	Jack Blanchard & Misty Morgan
3	2	I Can't Be Myself	Merle Haggard
7	4	I Can't Seem to Say Goodbye	Jerry Lee Lewis
3	4	I Do My Swinging at Home	David Houston
4	13	I Know How	Loretta Lynn
5	17	I Never Once Stopped Loving You	Connie Smith
5	2	I Never Picked Cotton	Roy Clark
12	33	I Walked Out on Heaven	Hank Williams, Jr.
22	11	I Wish I Had a Mommy Like You	Patti Page
9	—	I Wouldn't Live in New York City (If They Gave Me the Whole Damn Town)	Buck Owens
11	33	I'll Make Amends	Roy Drusky
2	3	I'll See Him Through	Tammy Wynette
9	7	I'm a Lover (Not a Fighter)	Skeeter Davis
20	37	I'm Alright	Lynn Anderson
18	21	I'm Leaving It Up to You	Johnny & Jonie Mosby
16	21	I've Been Everywhere	Lynn Anderson
17	6	I've Just Been Wasting My Time	John Wesley Ryles
4	2	If I Ever Fall in Love (With a Honky Tonk Girl)	Faron Young
62	13	If I'd Only Come and Gone	Clay Hart
2	8	If It's All the Same to You	Bill Anderson and Jan Howard
13	33	It's a Beautiful Day	Wynn Stewart
3	4	It's Only Make Believe	Glen Campbell
3	3	Jesus, Take a Hold	Merle Haggard
7	7	Jolie Girl	Marty Robbins
2	6	The Kansas City Song	Buck Owens
20	24	Land Mark Tavern	Del Reeves and Penny DeHaven
17	—	Lilacs and Fire	George Morgan
16	24	Live for the Good Times	Warner Mack
23	19	Lodi	Buddy Alan
5	4	Long Long Texas Road	Roy Drusky
16	16	Lord Is That Me	Jack Greene
14	—	Louisiana Man	Connie Smith
19	23	Love Hungry	Warner Mack
5	10	Love Is a Sometimes Thing	Bill Anderson
14	—	A Lover's Question	Del Reeves
13	—	(Lovin' Man) Oh Pretty Woman	Arlene Harden
42	5	Luziana River	Van Trevor
17	27	Marty Gray	Billie Jo Spears
4	2	Morning	Jim Ed Brown
18	—	The Most Uncomplicated Goodbye I've Ever Heard	Henson Cargill
3	4	Mule Skinner Blues	Dolly Parton
15	42	No Love at All	Lynn Anderson
10	4	Nobody's Fool	Jim Reeves
17	6	Northeast Arkansas Mississippi County Bootlegger	Kenny Price
6	15	Occasional Wife	Faron Young
25	11	Oh Happy Day	Glen Campbell
2	17	Once More with Feeling	Jerry Lee Lewis
2	2	One Minute Past Eternity	Jerry Lee Lewis
9	—	One Song Away	Tommy Cash
—	9	Orange Blossom Special	Doug Kershaw
16	—	Perfect Mountain	Don Gibson
18	48	Playin' Around with Love	Barbara Mandrell
18	—	Pull My String and Wind Me Up	Carl Smith
21	16	Right or Left at Oak Street	Roy Clark
9	8	Rise and Shine	Tommy Cash
17	33	Rocky Top	Lynn Anderson
71	12	Roll Over Beethoven	Linda Gail Lewis and Jerry Lee Lewis
20	2	Runnin' Bare	Jim Nesbitt
8	14	Salute to a Switchblade	Tom T. Hall
3	8	She Goes Walking Through My Mind	Billy Walker
10	4	She'll Be Hangin' Around Somewhere	Mel Tillis
6	33	She's Mine	George Jones
8	10	Shoeshine Man	Tom T. Hall
12	11	Singer of Sad Songs	Waylon Jennings
33	16	Sittin' in Atlanta Station	Nat Stuckey
12	10	So Sad (To Watch Good Love Go Bad)	Hank Williams, Jr. and Lois Johnson
4	3	Someday We'll Be Together	Bill Anderson and Jan Howard
18	26	Something to Brag About	Charlie Louvin and Melba Montgomery
36	14	Something to Think About	Luke the Drifter, Jr.
15	17	Something Unseen	Jack Greene
15	24	South	Roger Miller
7	22	Stay There, Till I Get There	Lynn Anderson
8	8	Take a Letter Maria	Anthony Armstrong Jones
5	8	The Taker	Waylon Jennings
14	—	Talk About the Good Times	Jerry Reed
13	10	Tell Me My Lying Eyes Are Wrong	George Jones
6	2	Thank God and Greyhound	Roy Clark
3	4	That's When She Started to Stop Loving You	Conway Twitty
8	27	Then He Touched Me	Jean Shepard
31	12	Then She's a Lover	Roy Clark
7	—	There's a Story (Goin' 'Round)	Dottie West and Don Gibson
9	32	Thinking 'Bout You, Babe	Billy Walker
20	22	This Night (Ain't Fit for Nothing but Drinking)	Dave Dudley
12	18	Togetherness	Buck Owens and Susan Raye
9	34	Tomorrow Is Forever	Porter Wagoner and Dolly Parton
63	3	Wabash Cannon Ball	Danny Davis
56	6	Walk a Mile in My Shoes	Joe South
13	6	We're Gonna Get Together	Buck Owens and Susan Raye
3	—	When a Man Loves a Woman (The Way That I Love You)	Billy Walker
21	6	When You're Hot, You're Hot	Porter Wagoner
6	9	Where Have All Our Heroes Gone	Bill Anderson
14	13	The Whole World Comes to Me	Jack Greene
11	5	Wings Upon Your Horns	Loretta Lynn
2	21	Wish I Didn't Have to Miss You	Jack Greene and Jeannie Seely
17	—	A Woman Lives for Love	Wanda Jackson
37	17	The Wonder of You	Elvis Presley
6	5	Wonders of the Wine	David Houston
15	30	You and Me Against the World	Bobby Lord
6	4	You Wanna Give Me a Lift	Loretta Lynn
8	15	You Wouldn't Know Love	Ray Price
27	11	You've Got Your Troubles (I've Got Mine)	Jack Blanchard & Misty Morgan

==== Singles released by Canadian artists ====
US	CAN	Single	Artist
—	15	The Call	Gene MacLellan
—	6	Cool Green Waters	Donna Ramsay
—	18	Don't Hate, Communicate	Gary Buck
—	12	Don't It Make You Wanna Go Home	Terry Roberts
—	20	Foolin' Around	Chaparrel Brothers
—	12	Fortunate Son	The Rainvilles
—	12	From Pulpit to Prison	Singing Parson
—	18	Hot Wheels	Stan Farlow
—	2	My Song for You	Mercey Brothers
—	19	Newfie Screech	Stevedore Steve
—	14	No Pity for a Fool	Mike Graham
26	13	Patches	Ray Griff
—	4	Pickin' Up the Pieces	Mercey Brothers
—	12	These Things	Mike Graham
—	20	Thorn in My Shoe	Gene MacLellan
—	2	To-Ma-Ray Tom-O-Ray	Billy Charne
—	9	Trucker's Cafe	Great Speckled Bird
—	3	Wait for Sunday	Tommy Hunter
—	4	Walk with Your Neighbour	Tommy Hunter

== Top new album releases ==
Album	Artist	Record Label
Charley Pride's 10th Album	Charley Pride	RCA
Christmas in My Home Town	Charley Pride	RCA
Coal Miner's Daughter	Loretta Lynn	Decca
The Fightin' Side of Me	Merle Haggard	Capitol
For the Good Times	Ray Price	Columbia
Hello Darlin'	Conway Twitty	Decca
Hello, I'm Johnny Cash	Johnny Cash	Columbia
Just Plain Charley	Charley Pride	RCA
Love Is a Sometimes Thing	Bill Anderson	Decca
Okie From Muskogee	Merle Haggard	Capitol
Tammy's Touch	Tammy Wynette	Epic
The Johnny Cash Show	Johnny Cash	Columbia
The World of Tammy Wynette	Tammy Wynette	Epic

=== Other top albums ===
Album	Artist	Record Label
A Real Live Dolly	Dolly Parton	RCA
Color Me Country	Linda Martell	Plantation
Country Boy & Country Girl	Jimmy Dean and Dottie West	RCA
Forever Yours	Dottie West	RCA
Husband Hunting	Liz Anderson	RCA
I'm Alright	Lynn Anderson	Chart
If It's All the Same to You	Bill Anderson and Jan Howard	Decca
Jack Greene, Jeannie Seely	Jack Greene and Jeannie Seely	Decca
Look at Mine	Jody Miller	Epic
No Love at All	Lynn Anderson	Columbia
Rock Me Back to Little Rock	Jan Howard	Decca
Skid Row Joe: Down in the Alley	Porter Wagoner	RCA
Snowbird	Anne Murray	Capitol
Stay There 'Til I Get There	Lynn Anderson	Columbia
Uptown Country Girl	Lynn Anderson	Chart
We're Gonna Get Together	Buck Owens and Susan Raye	Capitol
Where Have All Our Heroes Gone	Bill Anderson	Decca
Here's Loretta Singing "Wings Upon Your Horns"	Loretta Lynn	Decca

== Births ==
- March 14 — Kristian Bush, member of Sugarland
- July 10 — Gary LeVox, lead singer of Rascal Flatts.
- August 22 – George Canyon, country singer from the late 1990s who enjoyed success in the mid 2000s.
- August 24 — Kristyn Osborn, member of SHeDAISY
- August 25 — Jo Dee Messina, female vocalist of the 1990s and 2000s (decade).
- October 5 — Georgette Jones, the only biological child of George Jones and Tammy Wynette.
- October 25 — Chely Wright, country singer of the late 1990s and 2000s (decade).
- November 5 – Heather and Jennifer Kinley, recorded in the late 1990s as the duo The Kinleys
- November 15 — Jack Ingram, rock-styled country singer-songwriter since the mid-2000s (decade).
- December 10 — Kevin Sharp, country singer from the 1990s, best known for "Nobody Knows" (d. 2014)

== Deaths ==
- January 4 – Clayton McMichen, 69, pioneering fiddle player and member of the Skillet Lickers.
- April 1 — Paul Cohen, 61, pioneering record producer at Decca Records.
- September 5 – Curley Williams, 56, songwriter most famous for writing "Half as Much."

== Country Music Hall of Fame Inductees ==
- The Original Carter Family – (A. P. Carter 1891–1960, Sara Carter 1898–1979 and Mother Maybelle Carter 1909–1978)

== Major awards ==
=== Grammy Awards ===
- Best Female Country Vocal Performance — "(I Never Promised You a) Rose Garden", Lynn Anderson
- Best Male Country Vocal Performance — "For the Good Times", Ray Price
- Best Country Performance by a Duo or Group with Vocal — "If I Were a Carpenter", Johnny Cash and June Carter
- Best Country Instrumental Performance — Me & Jerry, Chet Atkins and Jerry Reed
- Best Country Song — "My Woman, My Woman, My Wife", Marty Robbins (Performer: Marty Robbins)

=== Juno Awards ===
- Country Male Vocalist of the Year — Tommy Hunter
- Country Female Vocalist of the Year — Dianne Leigh
- Country Group or Duo of the Year — Mercey Brothers

=== Academy of Country Music ===
- Entertainer of the Year — Merle Haggard
- Song of the Year — "For the Good Times", Kris Kristofferson (Performer: Ray Price)
- Single of the Year — "For the Good Times", Ray Price
- Album of the Year — For the Good Times, Ray Price
- Top Male Vocalist — Merle Haggard
- Top Female Vocalist — Lynn Anderson
- Top Vocal Group — The Kimberleys
- Top New Male Vocalist — Buddy Alan
- Top New Female Vocalist — Sammi Smith

=== Country Music Association ===
- Entertainer of the Year — Merle Haggard
- Song of the Year — "Sunday Mornin' Comin' Down", Kris Kristofferson (Performer: Johnny Cash)
- Single of the Year — "Okie from Muskogee", Merle Haggard
- Album of the Year — Okie from Muskogee, Merle Haggard
- Male Vocalist of the Year — Merle Haggard
- Female Vocalist of the Year — Tammy Wynette
- Vocal Duo of the Year — Porter Wagoner and Dolly Parton
- Vocal Group of the Year — Tompall and the Glaser Brothers
- Instrumentalist of the Year — Jerry Reed
- Instrumental Group of the Year — Danny Davis and the Nashville Brass
- Comedian of the Year — Roy Clark

== Other links ==
- Country Music Association
- Inductees of the Country Music Hall of Fame
