= List of RPM number-one country singles of 1970 =

These are the Canadian number-one country songs of 1970, per the RPM Country Tracks chart.

Issue date	Title	Artist	Ref
January 10	Blistered/See Ruby Fall	Johnny Cash	
January 17	Baby, Baby (I Know You're a Lady)	David Houston	
January 24	Big in Vegas	Buck Owens	
January 31	Six White Horses	Tommy Cash	
February 7	Six White Horses	Tommy Cash	
February 14	Fancy	Bobbie Gentry	
February 21	Fancy	Bobbie Gentry	
February 28	Brown Eyed Handsome Man	Waylon Jennings	
March 7	If I Were a Carpenter	Johnny Cash and June Carter Cash	
March 14	Honey Come Back	Glen Campbell	
March 21	Welfare Cadillac	Guy Drake	
March 28	Wayward Woman of the World	Gary Buck	
April 4	The Fightin' Side of Me	Merle Haggard	
April 11	Tennessee Bird Walk	Jack Blanchard & Misty Morgan	
April 18	Kentucky Rain	Elvis Presley	
April 25	My Woman My Woman My Wife	Marty Robbins	
May 2	My Woman My Woman My Wife	Marty Robbins	
May 9	Is Anybody Goin' to San Antone	Charley Pride	
May 16	The Way You Play	Merv Smith	
May 23	Big Joe Mufferaw	Stompin' Tom Connors	
May 30	Big Joe Mufferaw	Stompin' Tom Connors	
June 6	What Is Truth	Johnny Cash	
June 13	What Is Truth	Johnny Cash	
June 20	What Is Truth	Johnny Cash	
June 27	Street Singer	The Strangers	
July 4	She's a Little Bit Country	George Hamilton IV	
July 11	She's a Little Bit Country	George Hamilton IV	
July 18	She's a Little Bit Country	George Hamilton IV	
July 25	Ketchup Song	Stompin' Tom Connors	
August 1	Ketchup Song	Stompin' Tom Connors	
August 8	Wonder Could I Live There Anymore	Charley Pride	
August 15	Wonder Could I Live There Anymore	Charley Pride	
August 22	Snowbird	Anne Murray	
August 29	Snowbird	Anne Murray	
September 5	Snowbird	Anne Murray	
September 12	Everything a Man Could Ever Need	Glen Campbell	
September 19	Me and Bobby McGee	Gordon Lightfoot	
September 26	Countryfied	Dick Damron	
October 3	Countryfied	Dick Damron	
October 10	All for the Love of Sunshine	Hank Williams, Jr.	
October 17	Sunday Mornin' Comin' Down	Johnny Cash	
October 24	There Must Be More to Love Than This	Jerry Lee Lewis	
October 31	Back Where It's At	George Hamilton IV	
November 7	Run Woman Run	Tammy Wynette	
November 14	Ode to Suburbia	R. Harlan Smith	
November 21	Countryfied	Dick Damron	
November 28	The Ballad of Muk Tuk Annie	Jimmy Arthur Ordge	
December 5	I Can't Believe That You've Stopped Loving Me	Charley Pride	
December 12	Fifteen Years Ago	Conway Twitty	
December 19	Coal Miner's Daughter	Loretta Lynn	
December 26	Sweet Dreams of Yesterday	Hank Smith	

== See also ==
- 1970 in music
- List of number-one country singles of 1970 (U.S.)
