= The First Lady (Tammy Wynette album) =

Studio album by Tammy Wynette
- Released: October 5, 1970
- Recorded: May – June 1970
- Studios: Columbia Studio B (Nashville, Tennessee)
- Genres: Country; Nashville Sound
- Label: Epic
- Producer: Billy Sherrill

Tammy Wynette chronology
Tammy's Touch (1970)	The First Lady (1970)	Christmas with Tammy (1970)

Singles from The First Lady
- 1. "Run, Woman, Run" Released: August 1970

The First Lady is a studio album by American country artist, Tammy Wynette. It was released on October 5, 1970, via Epic Records and contained 11 tracks. It was the ninth studio album in Wynette's career. The disc featured both new material and covers of previously recorded material. Many of the recordings featured on the disc centered around themes about housewives keeping their spouses happy. The First Lady reached positions on both the American country albums and pop albums charts. Its only single, "Run, Woman, Run", topped the country charts. The album was met with mixed reviews following its release.

== Background ==
Tammy Wynette had become one of country music's most popular recording artists by the 1970s decade. She had a series of chart-topping country singles, including 1969's "Stand by Your Man". The song described the devotion women have towards their husbands despite their martial troubles. It became her signature song and crafted an image for Wynette as a working class housewife. Producer Billy Sherrill used "Stand by Your Man" as a foundation for the production and storyline to future chart-topping Tammy Wynette singles. Follow-up releases like "Singing My Song", "I'll See Him Through" and "He Loves Me All the Way" also topped the country charts. Among her successful follow-ups was 1970's "Run, Woman, Run", which also followed a similar story line to that of "Stand by Your Man". The song helped craft the making of Wynette's next studio release, The First Lady.

== Recording and content ==
The recording sessions for The First Lady took place between May and June 1970 at Columbia Studio B (the "Quonset hut studio"), located in Nashville, Tennessee. The sessions were produced entirely by Billy Sherrill. The album contained a total of 11 tracks. The tracks penned and chosen for the album echoed that of "Stand by Your Man's" story line. Many of the tracks followed themes associated with women attempting to keep marriages afloat. In the opening track, "Run, Woman, Run", a woman gives advice to other women about keeping their spouses satisfied. Six of the album's tracks were penned by Billy Sherrill. Among these recordings were the new tracks "Safe in These Loving Arms of Mine", "My Daddy Doll", "The Lovin' Kind" and "He's Still My Man". The Sherrill composition, "Playin' Around with Love", a was cover of the top 20 single by Barbara Mandrell. Also included were covers of Connie Smith's "I Never Once Stopped Loving You" and Patti Page's "I Wish I Had a Mommy Like You".

== Critical reception ==
Professional ratings
Review scores
Source	Rating
Allmusic	2.5/5 stars

The disc received mixed reviews from critics. In October 1970, Billboard magazine gave the album a positive response, highlighting Wynette's "unique touch" to the disc's cover songs. The magazine further commented, "Top material with exceptional performances." Meanwhile, Eugene Chadbourne of AllMusic only rated the album 2.5 out of 5 stars in his review. Chadbourne found the material to be too similar to that of "Stand by Your Man", citing Billy Sherrill for making this occur: "This album gives the impression that producer Billy Sherrill decided to somehow follow or even top "Stand by Your Man" in terms of having a female singer either cooing in submissiveness or pleading to be let back into the arms of a particular man. It proves too daunting a task for the producer in his second role as author or co-author of a good chunk of these songs."

== Release, chart performance and singles ==
The First Lady was released on October 5, 1970 on Epic Records. It was the ninth studio album in Wynette's career. It was originally issued as a vinyl LP, featuring five songs on "side one" and six songs on "side two". Decades later, it was re-released digitally by Sony Music Entertainment. Following its original release, The First Lady entered the American Billboard Top Country Albums chart and peaked at the number two position by December 1970. On the Billboard 200, it peaked at number 119. The only single on the disc was "Run, Woman, Run". It was released as single by Epic Records in August 1970. By October 1970, it reached number one on the Billboard Hot Country Songs chart. It also reached number 92 on the Billboard Hot 100 and topped the RPM Country chart in Canada.

== Track listing ==
Side one
No.	Title	Writer(s)	Length
1.	"Run, Woman, Run"	Ann Booth; Duke Goff; Dan Hoffman	2:25
2.	"I Wish I Had a Mommy Like You"	Billy Sherrill; Danny Walls; Norro Wilson	3:32
3.	"True and Lasting Love"	Carmol Taylor; Agnes Wilson	2:30
4.	"I Never Once Stopped Loving You"	Bill Anderson; Jan Howard	2:55
5.	"Safe in These Loving Arms of Mine"	Emily Mitchell; Sherrill; Wilson	2:10

Side two
No.	Title	Writer(s)	Length
1.	"Sally Trash"	Chet Atkins; Curly Putman	2:26
2.	"My Daddy Doll"	Sherill; Taylor; Tammy Wynette	2:52
3.	"The Lovin' Kind"	Mitchell; Sherrill; Wilson	3:01
4.	"He's Still My Man"	Sherrill	2:32
5.	"Buy Me a Daddy"	Taylor	2:28
6.	"Playin' Around with Love"	Sherrill	2:25

== Technical personnel ==
All credits are adapted from the liner notes of The First Lady.

- Lou Bradley – engineer
- Charlie Bragg – engineer
- The Jordanaires – backing vocals
- John Gabree – liner notes
- The Nashville Edition – backing vocals
- Billy Sherrill – producer

== Charts ==
Chart (1970)	Peak position
US Billboard 200	119
US Top Country Albums (Billboard)	2

== Release history ==
Region	Date	Format	Label	Ref.
Japan	October 5, 1970	Vinyl	CBS Records International; Sony Music	
North America	October 5, 1970	Vinyl	Epic Records	
North America	2010s	Music download; streaming	Sony Music Entertainment	
