= Rock Me Back to Little Rock =

Studio album by Jan Howard
- Released: June 1970
- Genre: Country; country pop
- Label: Decca
- Producer: Owen Bradley

Jan Howard chronology
If It's All the Same to You (1970)	Rock Me Back to Little Rock (1970)	Bill and Jan (Or Jan and Bill) (1972)

Singles from Rock Me Back to Little Rock
- 1. "We Had All the Good Things Going" Released: August 1969; 2. "Rock Me Back to Little Rock" Released: February 1970

Rock Me Back to Little Rock is a studio album by American country artist Jan Howard. It was released by Decca Records in June 1970 and was her tenth studio album. The project contained 11 tracks with a mixture of original tunes and cover songs. Among its tracks were two single releases: "We Had All the Good Things Going" and the title track. Both made appearances on the US country songs chart between 1969 and 1970. The album itself also made the US country chart. Both Billboard and Cash Box magazines reviewed the album following its release.

== Background, recording and content ==
Jan Howard was the former wife of country music songwriter Harlan Howard. With his encouragement, she began her own recording career in the late 1950s and had her first commercially-successful release in 1960 with "The One You Slip Around With". Signing with Decca Records in the middle 1960s, her recording career became more successful with top ten, top 20 and top 40 singles like "Evil on Your Mind", "My Son" and "Rock Me Back to Little Rock". The latter song would serve as the title for Howard's 1970 studio album, which consisted of 11 tracks and was produced by Owen Bradley. Among the new recordings were three songs penned by Howard herself: "Hello Stranger", "Love Is a Sometimes Thing" and "I Never Once Stopped Loving You". The latter was co-written with Bill Anderson. Additional tracks were cover tunes including "Let It Be", "Try a Little Kindness" and "Bridge Over Troubled Water".

== Release and critical reception ==
Rock Me Back to Little Rock was released in June 1970 by Decca Records and was Howard's tenth studio album in her career. It was distributed as both a vinyl LP and a cassette. Both versions had six tracks on "side 1" and five tracks on "side 2". The project was given reviews from music magazines of the era. Billboard found it the production to include country pop elements with a "varied collection" of songs along with "a few mavericks". Cash Box believed the album to sell well in record stores, writing, "Could be a good chart future in the cards for this package. Watch it."

== Chart performance and singles ==
Rock Me Back to Little Rock debuted on the US Billboard Top Country Albums chart on June 27, 1970. It did not rise higher than the number 42 position after three weeks on the chart. It was Howard's lowest charting album in her career and only album to peak outside the Billboard country top 40. A total of two singles were included on the project. Its earliest single was "We Had All the Good Things Going", which was first issued by Decca in August 1969. It later peaked at number 20 on the US country songs chart. The project's title track was issued as the second single in February 1970 by Decca. It rose to number 26 on the US country songs chart later that year.

== Track listing ==
Side one
No.	Title	Writer(s)	Length
1.	"Can You Feel It"	Bobby Goldsboro	2:35
2.	"You and Your Sweet Love"	Bill Anderson	2:45
3.	"We Had All the Good Things Going"	Jerry Monday; Mervin Shiner	2:30
4.	"Hello Stranger"	Jan Howard	2:15
5.	"Journey Goin' Nowhere"	Dee Moeller	2:09
6.	"Let It Be"	Lennon–McCartney	2:37

Side two
No.	Title	Writer(s)	Length
1.	"Rock Me Back to Little Rock"	Lola Jean Dillon	2:19
2.	"Love Is a Sometimes Thing"	Jan Howard	2:53
3.	"Try a Little Kindness"	Bobby Austin; Curt Sapaugh	2:12
4.	"I Never Once Stopped Loving You"	Bill Anderson; Jan Howard	2:54
5.	"Bridge Over Troubled Water"	Art Garfunkel; Roy Halee; Paul Simon	4:11

== Chart performance ==
Chart (1970)	Peak position
US Top Country Albums (Billboard)	42

== Release history ==
Region	Date	Format	Label	Ref.
North America	June 1970	Vinyl LP; cassette	Decca Records	
United Kingdom	1972	Vinyl LP	MCA Records	
