= Shoulder to shoulder =

Shoulder to shoulder may refer to:

- Shoulder to Shoulder, a 1974 BBC television mini-series and book relating the history of the women's suffrage movement
- "Shoulder to Shoulder" (song), a 2012 song by Rebecca Ferguson
- "Shoulder to Shoulder", a 1974 song by Keith Hudson
- "Shoulder to Shoulder (Arm and Arm)", a 1978 song by Roy Clark
- "Shoulder to Shoulder", a 2005 song by Carly Simon from the soundtrack of Disney's Pooh's Heffalump Movie
- Shoulder to Shoulder is a 1985 album by Test Dept with South Wales Striking Miners' Choir.
