= Roy Clark discography =

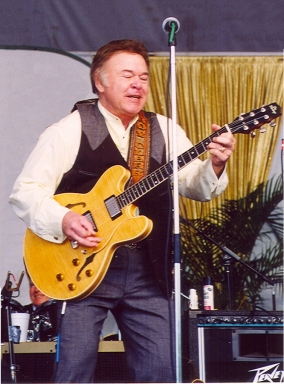
- Studio albums: 37
- Live albums: 9
- Compilation albums: 5
- Singles: 68

This is a detailed discography for American country music artist Roy Clark.

== Studio albums ==
=== 1960s ===
Title	Details	Peak chart positions	
Title	Details	US Country	US
The Lightning Fingers of Roy Clark	Release date: 1962; Label: Capitol Records	—	—
Roy Clark Sings the Tip of My Fingers	Release date: 1963; Label: Capitol Records	—	—
Happy to Be Unhappy	Release date: 1964; Label: Capitol Records	—	—
The Roy Clark Guitar Spectacular!	Release date: 1965; Label: Capitol Records	—	—
Roy Clark Sings Lonesome Love Ballads	Release date: 1966; Label: Capitol Records	21	—
Stringing Along with the Blues	Release date: 1966; Label: Capitol Records	—	—
Roy Clark	Release date: 1967; Label: Hilltop Records	—	—
Do You Believe This Roy Clark	Release date: 1968; Label: Dot Records	34	—
Yesterday, When I Was Young^{[A]}	Release date: 1969; Label: Dot Records	8	50
The Everlovin' Soul of Roy Clark	Release date: 1969; Label: Dot Records	11	129
"—" denotes releases that did not chart

=== 1970s ===
Title	Details	Peak chart positions	
Title	Details	US Country	US
The Other Side of Roy Clark	Release date: 1970; Label: Dot Records	—	—
I Never Picked Cotton	Release date: 1970; Label: Dot Records	8	176
The Incredible Roy Clark	Release date: 1971; Label: Dot Records	14	197
The Magnificent Sanctuary Band	Release date: 1971; Label: Dot Records	39	—
Roy Clark Country!	Release date: 1972; Label: Dot Records	10	112
Come Live with Me	Release date: 1973; Label: Dot Records	4	—
Roy Clark's Family Album	Release date: 1973; Label: Dot Records	2	204
Roy Clark / The Entertainer	Release date: 1974; Label: ABC/Dot Records	4	186
Roy Clark, Family and Friends	Release date: 1974; Label: ABC/Dot Records	27	—
Classic Clark	Release date: 1974; Label: ABC/Dot Records	13	—
Heart to Heart	Release date: 1975; Label: ABC/Dot Records	31	—
My Music & Me / Vocal & Instrumental	Release date: 1977; Label: ABC/Dot Records	38	—
Labor of Love	Release date: 1978; Label: ABC Records	44	—
Makin' Music (with Clarence "Gatemouth" Brown)	Release date: 1979; Label: MCA Records	—	—
My Music^{[B]}	Release date: 1979; Label: MCA Records	—	—
"—" denotes releases that did not chart

=== 1980s–1990s ===
Title	Details	Peak positions
Title	Details	US Country
Back to the Country	Release date: 1980; Label: MCA Records	—
Last Word in Jesus Is Us	Release date: 1981; Label: MCA Records	—
Turned Loose	Release date: 1982; Label: Churchill Records	43
Rockin' in the Country	Release date: 1986; Label: Silver Dollar Records	—
What a Wonderful World	Release date: 1989; Label: Hallmark Records	—
Great Picks and New Tricks	Release date: 1993; Label: BRD Records	—
Roy Clark & Joe Pass Play Hank Williams (with Joe Pass)	Release date: 1994; Label: Buster Ann Records	—
My Favorite Hymns	Release date: 1995; Label: Intersound Records	—
"—" denotes releases that did not chart

== Instrumental albums ==
Title	Details	Peak chart positions	
Title	Details	US Country	US
Urban, Suburban	Release date: 1968; Label: Dot Records	43	—
Roy Clark / Superpicker	Release date: 1973; Label: Dot Records	6	172
A Pair of Fives (Banjos, That Is) (with Buck Trent)	Release date: 1975; Label: ABC/Dot Records	9	—
Banjo Bandits (with Buck Trent)	Release date: 1978; Label: ABC Records	45	—
"—" denotes releases that did not chart

== Live albums ==
Title	Details	Peak positions
Title	Details	US Country
Roy Clark Show Live from Cheyenne Wyoming	Release date: 1962; Label: Capitol Records	—
Roy Clark Live!	Release date: 1967; Label: Tower Records	—
Roy Clark Live!	Release date: 1972; Label: Dot Records	4
Roy Clark in Concert	Release date: 1976; Label: ABC/Dot Records	14
Hookin' It	Release date: 1977; Label: ABC/Dot Records	44
The Roy Clark Show Live from Austin City Limits	Release date: 1982; Label: Churchill Records	49
Live in Branson	Release date: 1993; Label: Delta Records	—
Branson City Limits	Release date: 1998; Label: Page Music	—
Live at Billy Bob's Texas	Release date: 2000; Label: Image Entertainment	—
"—" denotes releases that did not chart

== Compilation albums ==
Title	Details	Peak chart positions	
Title	Details	US Country	US
Roy Clark's Greatest!	Release date: 1969; Label: Capitol Records	—	—
The Best of Roy Clark	Release date: 1971; Label: Dot Records	15	176
The Entertainer of the Year	Release date: 1974; Label: Capitol Records	13	—
Roy Clark's Greatest Hits - Volume 1	Release date: 1975; Label: ABC/Dot Records	15	—
Greatest Hits	Release date: 1995; Label: Varèse Sarabande Records	—	—
"—" denotes releases that did not chart

== Singles ==
=== 1950s–1960s ===
Year	Title	Peak chart positions						Album
Year	Title	US Country	US	US AC	CAN Country	CAN	CAN AC	Album
1954	"Mysteries of Life"	—	—	—	—	—	—	—N/a
1956	"Stepping Stones" (as Roy Clark and His Wranglers)	—	—	—	—	—	—	—N/a
1958	"Please Mr. Mayor"	—	—	—	—	—	—	—N/a
1960	"Rock Maggie Rock" (as Roy Clark and the Versitals)	—	—	—	—	—	—	—N/a
1961	"Under the Double Edge"	—	—	—	—	—	—	—N/a
1961	"Texas Twist"	—	—	—	—	—	—	The Lightning Fingers of Roy Clark
1962	"Talk About a Party"	—	—	—	—	—	—	—N/a
1963	"The Tip of My Fingers"	10	45	19	—	29	—	Roy Clark Sings the Tip of My Fingers
1963	"Application for Love"	—	—	—	—	—	—	—N/a
1964	"Through the Eyes of a Fool"	31	128	—	—	—	—	Happy to Be Unhappy
1964	"Take Me as I Am (Or Let Me Go)"	—	—	—	—	—	—	Happy to Be Unhappy
1964	"It's My Way"	—	—	—	—	—	—	Happy to Be Unhappy
1964	"Alabama Jubilee"	—	—	—	—	—	—	The Roy Clark Guitar Spectacular!
1965	"When the Wind Blows in Chicago"	37	—	—	—	—	—	Happy to Be Unhappy
1965	"Color of Her Love Is Blue"	—	—	—	—	—	—	—N/a
1965	"So Much to Remember"	—	—	—	—	—	—	—N/a
1966	"Malaguena"	—	—	—	—	—	—	The Roy Clark Guitar Spectacular!
1966	"Rose Colored Glasses"	—	—	—	—	—	—	—N/a
1966	"Hey Sweet Thing" (with Mary Taylor)	—	—	—	—	—	—	—N/a
1966	"St. Louis Blues"	—	—	—	—	—	—	Stringing Along with the Blues
1967	"Great Pretender"	—	—	—	—	—	—	—N/a
1968	"Do You Believe This Town"	53	—	—	—	—	—	Do You Believe This Roy Clark
1969	"Love Is Just a State of Mind"	57	—	—	—	—	—	Yesterday, When I Was Young
1969	"Yesterday When I Was Young"	9	19	6	2	7	1	Yesterday, When I Was Young
1969	"September Song"	40	103	12	4	54	11	Yesterday, When I Was Young
1969	"Right or Left at Oak Street"	21	123	—	16	94	50	The Everlovin' Soul of Roy Clark
"—" denotes releases that did not chart

=== 1970s ===
Year	Title	Peak chart positions							Album
Year	Title	US Country	US	US AC	CAN Country	CAN	CAN AC	Australia	Album
1970	"Then She's a Lover"	31	94	29	12	60	32	85	The Everlovin' Soul of Roy Clark
1970	"I Never Picked Cotton"	5	122	—	2	—	—	—	I Never Picked Cotton
1970	"Thank God and Greyhound"	6	90	—	2	—	—	—	I Never Picked Cotton
1971	"(Where Do I Begin) Love Story"	74	—	—	—	—	—	—	Roy Clark / Superpicker
1971	"A Simple Thing as Love"	45	—	—	40	—	—	—	The Best of Roy Clark
1971	"She Cried"	63	—	—	—	—	—	—	The Incredible Roy Clark
1971	"Magnificent Sanctuary Band"	39	—	—	23	—	—	—	The Magnificent Sanctuary Band
1972	"Ode to a Critter"	—	—	—	—	—	—	—	Roy Clark Country!
1972	"The Lawrence Welk - Hee Haw Counter-Revolution Polka"	9	—	—	4	—	—	—	Roy Clark Live!
1973	"Come Live with Me"	1	89	23	1	—	70	—	Come Live with Me
1973	"Riders in the Sky"	27	—	—	31	—	—	—	Roy Clark / Superpicker
1973	"Somewhere Between Love and Tomorrow"	2	81	—	5	92	—	—	Come Live with Me
1974	"Honeymoon Feelin'"	4	—	—	1	—	—	—	Roy Clark / The Entertainer
1974	"The Great Divide"	12	—	—	8	—	—	—	Classic Clark
1975	"Dear God"	64	—	—	—	—	—	—	Classic Clark
1975	"You're Gonna Love Yourself in the Morning"	35	—	—	46	—	—	—	Classic Clark
1975	"Heart to Heart"	16	—	47	8	—	—	—	Heart to Heart
1976	"If I Had to Do It All Over Again"	2	—	—	—	—	—	—	Heart to Heart
1976	"Think Summer"	21	—	20	14	—	—	—	Roy Clark in Concert
1977	"I Have a Dream, I Have a Dream"	26	—	—	—	—	—	—	My Music & Me / Vocal & Instrumental
1977	"Half a Love"	80	—	—	—	—	—	—	My Music & Me / Vocal & Instrumental
1977	"We Can't Build a Fire in the Rain"	40	—	—	24	—	—	—	My Music & Me / Vocal & Instrumental
1977	"Beat the System"	—	—	—	—	—	—	—	Television theme song for The Kallikaks
1978	"Must You Throw Dirt in My Face"	60	—	—	—	—	—	—	Labor of Love
1978	"Where Have You Been All of My Life"	65	—	—	—	—	—	—	Labor of Love
1978	"The Happy Days"	89	—	—	—	—	—	—	Labor of Love
1979	"Shoulder to Shoulder (Arm and Arm)"	34	—	—	46	—	—	—	Labor of Love
1979	"Four O'Clock in the Morning"	—	—	—	—	—	—	—	Makin' Music
"—" denotes releases that did not chart

=== 1980s ===
Year	Title	Peak chart positions		Album
Year	Title	US Country	CAN Country	Album
1980	"Chain Gang of Love"	21	23	My Music
1980	"If There Were Only Time for Love"	48	48	My Music
1980	"For Love's Own Sake"	73	69	My Music
1981	"I Ain't Got Nobody"	60	—	Back to the Country
1981	"She Can't Give It Away"	86	—	Back to the Country
1981	"Love Takes Two"	63	—	Back to the Country
1981	"The Last Word in Jesus Is Us"	73	—	Last Word in Jesus Is Us
1982	"Paradise Knife and Gun Club"	54	—	The Roy Clark Show Live from Austin City Limits
1982	"Tennessee Saturday Night"	85	—	The Roy Clark Show Live from Austin City Limits
1982	"Here We Go Again"	65	—	Turned Loose
1983	"I'm a Booger"	74	—	Turned Loose
1983	"Wildwood Flower"	55	—	—N/a
1984	"Another Lonely Night with You"	48	—	—N/a
1986	"Tobacco Road"	56	—	Rockin' in the Country
1986	"Juke Box Saturday Night"	61	—	Rockin' in the Country
1989	"What a Wonderful World"	73	—	What a Wonderful World
1989	"But, She Loves Me"	68	—	What a Wonderful World
"—" denotes releases that did not chart

== Charted B-sides ==
Year	Title	Peak positions	Original A-side
Year	Title	US Country	Original A-side
1983	"A Way Without Words"	flip	"I'm a Booger"
1986	"Night Life"	flip	"Juke Box Saturday Night"

== Notes ==
- A Yesterday, When I Was Young peaked at number 35 on the RPM Top Albums chart in Canada.
- B My Music peaked at number 22 on the RPM Country Albums chart in Canada.
