= Fade to Black: Memories of Johnny =

Studio album by Tommy Cash
- Released: September 2008
- Genres: Country, country rock
- Length: 38:17
- Label: In-Light
- Producer: Rick Lloyd

Fade to Black is a 2008 album by Tommy Cash. The album includes duets with George Jones, on "Some Kind of a Woman", and Marty Stuart, on "Six White Horses", a new version of Cash's 1970 hit, as well as several Johnny Cash songs in tribute to his late brother.

== Track listing ==
1. "Some Kind of a Woman" (Tommy Cash; Jimmy Peppers) - 2:48
  - duet with George Jones
2. "I Walk the Line" (Johnny Cash) - 2:20
  - duet with his son Mark Cash
3. "Fade to Black" (Tommy Cash, Nathan Whitt) - 3:45
4. "Six White Horses" (Larry Murray) - 2:46
  - duet with Marty Stuart
5. "Folsom Prison Blues" (Johnny Cash) - 2:26
6. "Ring of Fire" (June Carter, Merle Kilgore) - 2:44
7. "Ramblin' Kind" (Tommy Cash) - 2:29
8. "Ballad of a Teenage Queen" (Jack H. Clement) - 2:22
9. "Ragged Old Flag" (Johnny Cash) - 3:30
10. "Ghost Riders in the Sky" (Stan Jones) - 3:44
11. "Get Rhythm" (Johnny Cash) - 2:25
12. "Rise and Shine" (Carl Perkins) - 2:27
13. "San Quentin" (Johnny Cash) - 2:22
14. "Skip a Rope" (Jack Moran/Glenn Douglas Tubb) - 2:38
15. "On the Wings of a Dove" (Bob Ferguson) - 2:51
  - duet with his sister Joanne Cash Yates
