= Tommy Cash =

Tommy Cash may refer to:

- Tommy Cash (country singer) (1940–2024), American country musician
- Tommy Cash (rapper) (born 1991), Estonian rapper
