= Christmas in My Home Town =

Christmas in My Hometown

Studio album by Charley Pride
- Released: November 1970
- Recorded: August 27, 1969
- Studio: RCA, Nashville, Tennessee
- Genre: Country; holiday
- Label: RCA Victor
- Producer: Jack Clement (original)

Charley Pride chronology
Charley Pride's 10th Album (1970)	Christmas in My Hometown (1970)	From Me to You (1971)

Singles from Christmas in My Home Town
- 1. "Christmas in My Home Town" Released: November 1970

Christmas in My Home Town is a studio album by American country artist Charley Pride. It was released in November 1970 via RCA Victor Records and was produced by Jack Clement. It was Pride's first collection of holiday music and his ninth studio recording, overall. It originally contained ten tracks in its initial release, but was re-released with additional tracks in 2013. It received positive reviews from critics following its release.

== Background and content ==
By 1970, Charley Pride had several major hits after becoming country music's first commercially successful African-American artist. He had recently had five number one hits, which heightened his musical popularity: "All I Have to Offer You (Is Me)," "(I'm So) Afraid of Losing You Again," "Is Anybody Goin' to San Antone," "Wonder Could I Live There Anymore" and "I Can't Believe That You've Stopped Loving Me." Pride's commercial success prompted his record label to have him record album of Christmas music. The project was first recorded on August 27, 1969, at the RCA Victor Studio, located in Nashville, Tennessee. The sessions were originally produced by Jack Clement.

Christmas in My Home Town contained a mix of holiday classics and original tunes. The album originally contained ten tracks, but a re-release added three more. Two of the project's tracks were composed by Pride himself: "Santa and the Kids" and "Happy Christmas Day." Other original tracks featured were the title track, composed by Lassaye Van Buren Holmes and "The First Christmas Morn." Holiday covers included "Silent Night," "Little Drummer Boy" and "O Holy Night."

== Critical reception ==
Professional ratings
Review scores
Source	Rating
AllMusic	4.5/5 stars

Christmas in My Home Town has received positive reviews since its initial release in 1970. In a November 1970 issue of Billboard, writers praised Pride's performance on the record. "Country Charley Pride has a sure winner in this top program of new and older Christmas favorites." He called his covers of songs such as "O Holy Night" to be "first rate treatments." They also praised Pride's original material that was also included on the album. The online music publication, Ultimate Twang, reviewed the original LP as well and also gave it a positive reception. Writers commented that it was "an excellent album, by one of the best country singers of all-time." The re-released version of the album was reviewed by AllMusic's David A. Milberg, who wrote, "The title tune was a great Christmas hit. This is mellow C&W for the holidays."

== Release ==
Christmas in My Home Town was originally released in November 1970 on RCA Victor Studios. It was Pride's ninth studio recording in his career. The project was originally distributed as a vinyl LP, containing five songs on either side of the record. The album was then re-released on a compact disc in 2013, and featured three additional holiday tracks that first been recorded for various Christmas compilations. The newer version featured re-mastering and production as well. The re-release was issued on Music City Records, Pride's record label at the time. The re-released version was also issued to digital and streaming services, which included Apple Music. The title track was the album's only single. It was released in November 1970. The single received significant holiday airplay and became one of the year's top holiday tunes.

== Track listings ==
=== Vinyl version ===
Side one
No.	Title	Writer(s)	Length
1.	"Christmas in My Home Town"	Lassaye Van Buren Holmes	2:03
2.	"Deck the Halls"	Traditional	1:50
3.	"They Stood in Silent Prayer"	Alex Zanetis	4:02
4.	"Santa and the Kids"	Sue Lane; Charley Pride	1:51
5.	"Silent Night"	Traditional	3:00

Side two
No.	Title	Writer(s)	Length
1.	"Little Drummer Boy"	Harry Simeone; Katherine Kennicott Davis; Henry Onorati	2:03
2.	"Happy Christmas Day"	Lane; Pride	2:09
3.	"The First Christmas Morn"	Lane	3:12
4.	"Christmas and Love"	Holmes	2:01
5.	"O Holy Night"	Traditional	4:15

=== Digital and compact disc versions ===
Side one
No.	Title	Writer(s)	Length
1.	"Christmas in My Home Town"	Van Buren Holmes	2:07
2.	"Deck the Halls"	Traditional; arranged by Charley Pride	1:54
3.	"They Stood in Silent Prayer"	Alex Zanetis	4:05
4.	"Santa and the Kids"	Sue Lane; Pride	1:55
5.	"Silent Night"	Traditional; arranged by Charley Pride	3:05
6.	"Little Drummer Boy"	Harry Simeone; Katherine K. Davis; Henry Onorati	2:06
7.	"Happy Christmas Day"	Sue Lane; Pride	2:15
8.	"The First Christmas Morn"	Sue Lane	3:15
9.	"Christmas and Love"	Holmes	2:06
10.	"O Holy Night"	Traditional; arranged by Charley Pride	4:20

Bonus tracks
No.	Title	Writer(s)	Length
11.	"Out of the East"	Harry Noble	3:34
12.	"Christmas Without Mary"	Blake Mevis; William Shore; David Wills	3:48
13.	"Let It Snow, Let It Snow, Let It Snow"	Sammy Cahn; Julie Styne	1:51

== Personnel ==
All credits are adapted from the 2013 liner notes of Christmas in My Home Town.

Musical personnel

- Willie Ackerman – drums
- Beegie Adair – piano
- Doris Allen – violin
- Joseph Babcock – background vocals
- Bobby Becker – violin
- George Binkley – violin
- Harold Bradley – guitar
- David Briggs – piano, keyboards
- Mark Casstevens – guitar
- Jimmy Colvard – bass
- Pete Drake – steel guitar
- Ray Edenton – guitar
- Dolores Edgin – background vocals
- Jack Eubanks – guitar
- Solie Fott – viola
- Sonny Garrish – steel guitar
- Johnny Gimble – fiddle
- Billy Grammer – rhythm guitar
- Lloyd Green – steel guitar
- Milton Hackney – violin
- Rob Hajacos – fiddle
- Buddy Harman – drums
- Hoyt Hawkins – background vocals
- Mitch Humphries – keyboards
- David Hungate – bass
- Junior Huskey – bass
- William Irwin – organ
- Jimmy Isabelle – drums
- The Jordanaires – background vocals
- Millie Kirkham – background vocals
- Neal Matthews – background vocals
- Terry McMillan – background vocals
- Farrell Morris – bells, percussion, vibraphone
- Robert Mowrey – viola
- The Nashville Edition – background vocals
- Fred Newell – guitar
- June Page – background vocals
- Jo Parker – violin
- Larry Paxton – bass
- Gary Prim – keyboards
- Hargus "Pig" Robbins – piano
- Brent Rowan – guitar
- Billy Sanford – bass, electric guitar
- Dale Sellers – electric guitar
- Lisa Silver – background vocals
- Buddy Spicher – fiddle
- Bobby Thompson – guitar
- David Vaderkool – cello
- Pete Wade – guitar
- Carol Walker – violin
- Raymond Walker – background vocals
- Gary Williams – cello
- Bergen White – bells
- Chip Young – guitar
- Curtis Young – background vocals
- Joe Zinkan – bass

Technical personnel

- Jack Clement – producer
- Doug Crider – assistant engineer
- Greg Gosselin – art direction, design, liner notes, project supervisor
- Bill Harris – engineer
- Jack D. Johnson – arranger
- Les Ladd – recording technician
- Blake Mevis – producer
- Jimmy Moore – cover photo
- Al Pachucki – engineer
- Tom Pick – engineer
- Roy Shockley – recording technician
- Bergen White – arranger
- M.G. Wilder – mastering
- Norro Wilson – producer

== Certifications ==
Region	Certification	Certified units/sales
Canada (Music Canada)	Gold	50,000^{^}
^{^} Shipments figures based on certification alone.

== Release history ==
Region	Date	Format	Label	Ref.
Canada	November 1970	Vinyl	RCA Victor Records	
United States	November 1970	Vinyl	RCA Victor Records	
United Kingdom	1973	Vinyl	RCA Victor Records	
United States	1976	Vinyl	RCA Victor Records	
United States	2010s	Digital download; streaming	Sony Music Entertainment	
United States	2013	Compact disc	Music City Records	
