= The Best of Connie Smith Volume II =

Compilation album by Connie Smith
- Released: March 1970
- Recorded: 1967 – 1969
- Studio: RCA Victor Studios
- Genre: Country
- Label: RCA Victor
- Producer: Bob Ferguson

Connie Smith chronology
| Sunday Morning with Nat Stuckey & Connie Smith (1970) | The Best of Connie Smith Volume II (1970) | I Never Once Stopped Loving You (1970) |

Singles from The Best of Connie Smith Volume II
- 1. "You and Your Sweet Love" Released: October 1969

The Best of Connie Smith Volume II is a compilation album by American country singer Connie Smith, released in March 1970 by RCA Victor, her second "Best Of" compilation. The album compiled Smith's most popular singles between 1967 and 1969. The album reached the top 30 of the American country albums chart following its release. Also included was two new recordings. Of these new recordings, one was released as a single in 1969. Titled "You and Your Sweet Love", it reached the top ten of the country singles chart.

== Background and content ==
Connie Smith had been recording for RCA Victor since 1964 and reached the number one spot on the country chart with her debut single, "Once a Day". The song launched a series of uninterrupted top ten and top 20 country singles through the decade. Smith's label released her first compilation in 1967 titled The Best of Connie Smith. With more top ten and 20 singles through 1969 the label would compile a second compilation in 1970 titled The Best of Connie Smith, Volume II. The album consisted of ten tracks, five of which had been top ten or top 20 country singles on the American country chart: "Baby's Back Again" (1967), "Burning a Hole in My Mind" (1968), "Run Away Little Tears" (1968), "Cry, Cry, Cry" (1968) and "Ribbon of Darkness" (1969).

The album also contained four songs originally included on Smith's studio albums from the 1960s. "Don't Feel Sorry for Me" first appeared on her 1967 album I Love Charley Brown. "Seattle" was pulled from Smith's 1969 disc Connie's Country, while "How Great Thou Art" was pulled from her second 1969 album titled Back in Baby's Arms. These tracks were originally recorded between 1967 and 1969 at RCA Victor Studios located in Nashville, Tennessee. These sessions were produced by Bob Ferguson. "Only for Me" was a track not previously issued on an album, along with "You and Your Sweet Love".

== Release and chart performance ==
The Best of Connie Smith Volume II was released in March 1970 on the RCA Victor record label. It was the second compilation album released in Smith's career. It was originally issued by the label as a vinyl LP, containing five recordings on each side of the disc. The album spent seven weeks on the America's Billboard Top Country Albums chart, debuting in April 1970. By May 16, the disc peaked at number 26 on the country albums chart, becoming her third release to chart outside the top 20. Of the album's two new recordings, the Bill Anderson-penned "You and Your Sweet Love" was released as a single. RCA Victor rush-released the song as a single in October 1969. Spending 15 weeks on the Billboard Hot Country Songs chart, the single peaked at number six in December 1969. "You and Your Sweet Love" became Smith's thirteenth top ten single in her career.

== Track listing ==
Side one
| No. | Title | Writer(s) | Original album | Length |
|---|---|---|---|---|
| 1. | "Ribbon of Darkness" | Gordon Lightfoot | Connie's Country | 2:38 |
| 2. | "Cry, Cry, Cry" | Shirley Wood | Connie in the Country | 2:29 |
| 3. | "Burning a Hole in My Mind" | Cy Coben | I Love Charley Brown | 2:20 |
| 4. | "Baby's Back Again" | Betty Jean Robinson | I Love Charley Brown | 2:18 |
| 5. | "How Great Thou Art" | Stuart K. Hine | Back in Baby's Arms | 4:10 |

Side two
| No. | Title | Writer(s) | Original album | Length |
|---|---|---|---|---|
| 1. | "You and Your Sweet Love" | Bill Anderson | — | 2:47 |
| 2. | "Seattle" | Jack Keller; Hugo Montenegro; Ernie Sheldon | Connie's Country | 2:55 |
| 3. | "Run Away Little Tears" | Dallas Frazier | I Love Charley Brown | 2:28 |
| 4. | "Only for Me" | Liz Anderson | — | 2:44 |
| 5. | "Don't Feel Sorry for Me" | Ted Harris | I Love Charley Brown | 2:13 |

== Chart performance ==
| Chart (1970) | Peak position |
|---|---|
| US Top Country Albums (Billboard) | 26 |

== Release history ==
| Region | Date | Format | Label | Ref. |
|---|---|---|---|---|
| North America | March 1970 | Vinyl | RCA Victor Records | |
