= Damon Records =

Damon Records was a United States record label.

== Original ==
Victor "Vic" Leroy Damon started a recording business, Damon Transcription Laboratory in 1933 in Kansas City (Midland Building at 1221 Baltimore). He later moved the studio to 117 W. 14th Street and operated it, under the name Damon Recording Studios, until retirement in 1973. His assistant, Chuck Chapman, kept the studio running until 1975, then moved into the Cavern Sound facility in Independence, Missouri, for two more years operating as Cavern/Damon.

Damon was an in-house label of the Damon's studio. Damon used musicians and singers who were not members of the American Federation of Musicians labor union to make recordings during the ban on Union recordings ordered by James Petrillo.

In May 1948, the singing duo of Jon and Sondra Steele released "My Happiness" on Damon Records, a fact that was acknowledged on sheet music promoting the song. One of the better known artists with Damon was big band bandleader Al Trace. The Al Trace Orchestra recorded for major labels in the 1940s in addition to Damon. Trace was a writer on several popular songs, including "If I'd Known You Were Coming I'd Have Baked a Cake."

The label was still in existence up to at least 1960, when a rock 'n' roll group from Pittsburg, Kan., Conny and the Bellhops, had a regional hit with a 45 titled "Shot Rod," an instrumental on the Damon label.

The Vic Damon Collection is part of the Marr Sound Archives at the University of Missouri-Kansas City.

== Rebirth ==
- Damon was a Canadian music label during the 1970's and 1980s. The Edmonton-based label released several notable artists including Juno nominee Jimmy Arthur Ordge, country singer-songwriter Jack Hennig, The Rodeo Song's Garry Lee and the Showdown, Bob and Doug McKenzie's 1981 The Great White North album, and polka great Bob Kames.
- In 2010, a small group of people "relaunched" Damon Records as an independent record label. The label's primary genre focus is indie rock music, different from the types of music that the original Damon Records put out.

== See also ==
- List of record labels
