= Weir, Kentucky =

Unincorporated community in Kentucky, United States

- Unincorporated community
- Location within Kentucky Location within the United States
- Coordinates: 37°7′23″N 87°12′45″W
- Country: United States
- State: Kentucky
- County: Muhlenberg
- Elevation: 630 ft (190 m)
- Time zone: UTC-6 (Central (CST))
  - Summer (DST): UTC-5 (CST)
- GNIS feature ID: 506357

Weir (/wɪər/) is an unincorporated community located in Muhlenberg County, Kentucky, United States.

== History ==
A post office called Weir was established in 1894, and remained in operation until 1915. The community was named in honor of a family of early settlers.

Country music singer Guy Drake was born in Weir.
