= List of RPM number-one country singles of 1967 =

These are the Canadian number-one country songs of 1967, per the RPM Country Tracks chart.

Issue date	Title	Artist
January 2	Whistling on the River	Mercey Brothers
January 14	Whistling on the River	Mercey Brothers
January 21	The Weatherman	Gary Buck
January 28	The Weatherman	Gary Buck
February 4	The Weatherman	Gary Buck
February 11	The Weatherman	Gary Buck
February 18	The Weatherman	Gary Buck
February 25	Whistling on the River	Mercey Brothers
March 4	Take This Heart of Mine	Odie Workman
March 11	Take This Heart of Mine	Odie Workman
March 18	Whirlpool	Bambi Lynn
March 25	Whirlpool	Bambi Lynn
April 1	Ten Foot Pole	Johnny Ellis
April 8	Ten Foot Pole	Johnny Ellis
April 15	Ten Foot Pole	Johnny Ellis
April 22	Irena Cheyenne	Jimmy Arthur Ordge
April 29	Irena Cheyenne	Jimmy Arthur Ordge
May 6	Irena Cheyenne	Jimmy Arthur Ordge
May 13	Uncle Tom	Mercey Brothers
May 20	Uncle Tom	Mercey Brothers
May 27	Uncle Tom	Mercey Brothers
June 3	I Can't Even Do Wrong Right	Johnny Burke
June 10	I Can't Even Do Wrong Right	Johnny Burke
June 17	Uncle Tom	Mercey Brothers
June 24	Uncle Tom	Mercey Brothers
July 1	Uncle Tom	Mercey Brothers
July 8	It's Just About Over	Johnny Clark
July 15	It's Just About Over	Johnny Clark
July 22	It's Just About Over	Johnny Clark
July 29	The Alcan Run	Bud Roberts
August 5	The Alcan Run	Bud Roberts
August 12	I Got What I Wanted	The Rainvilles
August 19	I Got What I Wanted	The Rainvilles
August 26	I Got What I Wanted	The Rainvilles
September 2	Take the Bad with the Good	Lynn Jones
September 9	The Sound That Makes Me Blue	Dianne Leigh
September 16	The Sound That Makes Me Blue	Dianne Leigh
September 23	The Sound That Makes Me Blue	Dianne Leigh
September 30	The Sound That Makes Me Blue	Dianne Leigh
October 7	Human Nature	Orval Prophet
October 14	Human Nature	Orval Prophet
October 21	Too Far Gone	Lucille Starr
October 28	Too Far Gone	Lucille Starr
November 4	Too Far Gone	Lucille Starr
November 11	You Mean the World to Me	David Houston
November 18	You Mean the World to Me	David Houston
November 25	You Mean the World to Me	David Houston
December 2	Gardenias in Her Hair	Marty Robbins
December 9	Deep Water	Carl Smith
December 16	Mary in the Morning	Tommy Hunter
December 23	Mary in the Morning	Tommy Hunter
December 30	It Takes People Like You (To Make People Like Me)	Buck Owens

== See also ==
- 1967 in music
