= I Never Once Stopped Loving You =

Studio album by Connie Smith
- Released: September 1970
- Recorded: September 1969 – April 1970
- Studio: RCA Victor Studios
- Genre: Country; traditional country
- Label: RCA Victor
- Producer: Bob Ferguson; Ronny Light

Connie Smith chronology
The Best of Connie Smith, Vol. 2 (1970)	I Never Once Stopped Loving You (1970)	Where Is My Castle (1971)

Singles from I Never Once Stopped Loving You
- 1. "You and Your Sweet Love" Released: October 1969; 2. "I Never Once Stopped Loving You" Released: March 1970; 3. "Louisiana Man" Released: August 1970

I Never Once Stopped Loving You is the fourteenth solo studio album by American country singer Connie Smith, released in September 1970 by RCA Victor. The collection mixed original material with covers of previously recorded songs. Three singles were included on the album: "You and Your Sweet Love", the title track and "Louisiana Man". Both "You and Your Sweet Love" and the title track reached the top ten on the American country songs chart in 1970. The album itself charted in the top 20 of the American country LP's survey. Billboard magazine gave the LP a positive response following its original release.

== Background ==
Connie Smith reached her peak success in the mid 1960s with a series of uninterrupted top ten country singles, beginning with 1964's "Once a Day". Despite becoming a Christian in 1968 and devoting more time to spiritual endeavors, Smith continued to regularly record for the RCA Victor label. Smith's singles made the top ten less regularly following 1968 but she continued having commercial success. After finishing her final recording sessions for a duet album with Nat Stuckey, Smith began working on material for next studio album which would be titled I Never Once Stopped Loving You. The album was described by Smith herself as a traditional country collection.

== Recording and content ==
The recording sessions for I Never Once Stopped Loving You occurred over five sessions in 1970: February 3, February 4, March 6, March 18 and April 17. The only exception was the track "You and Your Sweet Love", which was pulled from a recording session in September 1969. The song was first included on Smith's compilation released in March 1970 titled The Best of Connie Smith Volume II. Four of the album's sessions were produced by Smith's longtime producer at RCA Victor, Bob Ferguson. However, the tracks "Louisiana Man" and "There's Something Lonely in This House" were produced by Ronny Light. He had previously produced sessions for Skeeter Davis and Waylon Jennings.

The album contained a total of ten tracks. "Think I'll Go Somewhere and Cry Myself to Sleep", "You and Your Sweet Love" and the title track were composed by Bill Anderson, whom had discovered Smith and written much of her early material. The title track also included writing credits from singer Jan Howard. Three tracks on the album were covers of previously recorded country songs. Included was Charley Pride's number one single "(I'm So) Afraid of Losing You Again", Faron Young's number one single "Alone with You" and George Jones's top ten single "If My Heart Had Windows". Smith was first offered "If My Heart Had Windows" but she originally declined it. She later chose to record it for her 1970 album after Jones released his own version. "I do admit that it is hard to believe that I would turn down that song at all!" she recounted. As part of Smith's new Christian beliefs, she incorporated more gospel selections onto her country albums. Included on the album were two gospel tracks: a cover of the hymn "I'll Fly Away" and a new ballad called "The Son Shines Down on Me". The latter was written by Larry Lee, who was part of Johnny Cash's publishing company and wrote the liner notes for I Never Once Stopped Loving You.

== Release and reception ==
I Never Once Stopped Loving You was released in September 1970 on the RCA Victor label. It was Smith's sixteenth studio album of her career and her fourteenth solo album (she recorded two as a duet team with Nat Stuckey). The disc was originally distributed as a vinyl LP, containing five songs on each side of the record. Decades later, the album was reissued to digital and streaming sites on the Sony Music Entertainment label. In its original release, Billboard magazine gave the LP a positive response, calling Smith "one of the most beautiful singers" in country music. The magazine highlighted the title track, "Louisiana Man", "The Sun Shines Down on Me" and "I'm So Afraid of Losing You Again". They concluded by saying, "You can expect strong sales from this LP." Biographer Barry Mazor also commenting positively on the project, finding it to be "one of her most consistent and strongest albums."

The album spent 11 weeks on the American Billboard Top Country Albums chart, peaking at number 15 in October 1970. It became Smith's sixth studio record to peak in the top 20. Included on the record were three singles. "You and Your Sweet Love" was first issued as a single by RCA Victor in October 1969 and peaked at number six on the Billboard Hot Country Songs chart in 1970. The title track was released as the next single in March 1970. The song became Smith's fourteenth top ten single on the Billboard country chart, peaking at number five. "Louisiana Man" was the third single included on the album and was first released by RCA Victor in August 1970. The single peaked at number 14 on the Billboard country chart, becoming her fourth song to place in the country top 20.

== Track listings ==
=== Vinyl version ===
Side one
No.	Title	Writer(s)	Length
1.	"Louisiana Man"	Doug Kershaw	2:24
2.	"There's Something Lonely in This House"	Lola Jean Dillon	2:48
3.	"If My Heart Had Windows"	Dallas Frazier	2:53
4.	"You and Your Sweet Love"	Bill Anderson	2:47
5.	"I'll Fly Away"	Albert B. Brumley	2:17

Side two
No.	Title	Writer(s)	Length
1.	"Alone with You"	Roy Drusky; Lester Vanadore; Faron Young	1:52
2.	"I Never Once Stopped Loving You"	Anderson; Jan Howard	2:51
3.	"The Son Shines Down on Me"	Larry Lee	3:32
4.	"Think I'll Go Somewhere (And Cry Myself to Sleep)"	Anderson	2:51
5.	"(I'm So) Afraid of Losing You Again"	Frazier; Arthur Leo Owens	2:51

=== Digital version ===
I Never Once Stopped Loving You (download and streaming)
No.	Title	Writer(s)	Length
1.	"Louisiana Man"	Kershaw	2:26
2.	"There's Something Lonely in This House"	Dillon	2:52
3.	"If My Heart Had Windows"	Frazier	2:56
4.	"You and Your Sweet Love"	Anderson	2:50
5.	"I'll Fly Away"	Brumley	2:20
6.	"Alone with You"	Drusky; Vanadore; Young	1:54
7.	"I Never Once Stopped Loving You"	Anderson; Howard	2:54
8.	"The Son Shines Down on Me"	Lee	3:36
9.	"Think I'll Go Somewhere (And Cry Myself to Sleep)"	Anderson	2:53
10.	"(I'm So) Afraid of Losing You Again"	Frazier; Owens	2:54

== Personnel ==
All credits are adapted from the liner notes of I Never Once Stopped Loving You and the biography booklet by Barry Mazor titled Just for What I Am.

Musical personnel

- Joseph Babcock – backing vocals
- David Briggs – piano
- Jerry Carrigan – drums
- James Crawford – steel guitar
- Bobby Dyson – electric bass
- Ray Edenton – rhythm guitar
- Dolores Edgin – backing vocals
- Hoyt Hawkins – backing vocals
- Buddy Harman – drums
- Junior Huskey – bass
- James Isbell – drums
- Grady Martin – electric guitar, leader
- Charlie McCoy – harmonica
- Neal Matthews – backing vocals
- Weldon Myrick – steel guitar
- June Page – backing vocals
- Dean Porter – guitar, leader
- Hargus "Pig" Robbins – piano
- Jerry Shook – rhythm guitar
- Billy Sanford – electric guitar
- Connie Smith – lead vocals
- Gordon Stoker – backing vocals
- Pete Wade – electric guitar
- Bill Walker – organ, vibraphone
- Ray Walker – backing vocals
- Hurshel Wiginton – backing vocals
- Jerry Whitehurst – piano
- Chip Young – rhythm guitar

Technical personnel

- Jerry Bradley – producer (overdub session for Ronnie Light; March 16, 1971)
- Bob Ferguson – producer
- Larry Lee – liner notes
- Les Leverett – cover photo
- Ronny Light – producer
- Al Pachucki – recording engineer
- Mike Shockley – recording technician
- Roy Shockley – recording technician
- Bill Vandevort – recording engineer

== Chart performance ==
Chart (1970)	Peak position
US Top Country Albums (Billboard)	15

== Release history ==
Region	Date	Format	Label	Ref.
North America	September 1970	Vinyl	RCA Victor Records	
North America	2010s	Music download; streaming	Sony Music Entertainment	
