= The World of Tammy Wynette =

Compilation album by American Country music artist Tammy Wynette

Compilation album by Tammy Wynette
- Released: May 1970
- Genre: Country; Nashville Sound
- Label: Epic
- Producer: Billy Sherrill

Tammy Wynette chronology
Tammy's Touch (1970)	The World of Tammy Wynette (1970)	The First Lady (1970)

The World of Tammy Wynette is a compilation album by American country artist Tammy Wynette. It was released in May 1970 via Epic Records and contained 20 tracks of previously recorded material. The album comprised a series of recordings that originally appeared on Wynette's studio albums but were not issued as a singles. Some of the album's material were covers of songs first recorded by other music artists. It was originally issued on two separate discs and was later re-released in 2009. The World of Tammy Wynette appeared on both the Billboard country albums chart and the pop chart. The disc received mixed reviews from critics.

== Background, recording and content ==
Tammy Wynette had become one of country music's most popular recording artists. Following a series of number one singles (including her signature "Stand by Your Man"), she had reached her commercial zenith by the early 1970s. To help encapsulate on her popularity, Epic Records released the compilation titled The World of Tammy Wynette in 1970. None of the album's material were previously issued as singles. Instead, it featured previously released album tracks that originated from Wynette's studio albums on the Epic label.

A total of 20 tracks comprised the compilation and were originally produced by Billy Sherrill. Sherrill co-composed with Glenn Sutton three of the compilation's material: "Where Could You Go (But to Her)", "Good" and "Kiss Away". Wynette herself penned the track "I Stayed Long Enough". Several covers appeared on the compilation. "Honey" was first recorded and made a chart-topping country single by Bobby Goldsboro. "Don't Come Home a Drinkin' (With Lovin' on Your Mind)" was first a number one country single by Loretta Lynn. "Ode to Billie Joe" was first a chart-topping pop song by Bobbie Gentry. "Yesterday" topped the pop charts originally by The Beatles while "There Goes My Everything" topped the country charts originally by Jack Greene. Wynette's version of "Cry" was first a pop hit by Johnnie Ray. "Don't Touch Me" was first a number two country single for Jeannie Seely. "It's My Way" went to number three on the country charts first by Webb Pierce. "The Legend of Bonnie and Clyde" first was a number one hit by Merle Haggard.

== Release, chart performance and reception ==
Professional ratings
Review scores
Source	Rating
Allmusic	3/5 stars

The World of Tammy Wynette was originally released in May 1970 on Epic Records. It was originally distributed as a two-disc vinyl LP, featuring ten tracks on each disc. In 2009, it was re-released as a compact disc by the Wounded Bird label with an identical cover photo and track listing. In its original release, the album peaked at number eight on the American Billboard Top Country Albums chart and number 145 on the Billboard 200. The album received mixed reviews by critics. Billboard magazine first reviewed the disc in 1970 and called the tracks to be "topnotch selections" while calling Wynette a "marvelous singer". Meanwhile, Charity Stafford of AllMusic rated the album three out of five stars. Stafford commented that some fans might feel "a bit cheated" with the lack of hits featured on the album. Stafford concluded, "This single-disc reissue on Wounded Bird Records is a basic, no-frills budget-line release, but it serves a needed function in returning these songs into circulation."

== Track listing ==
Side one, disc one
No.	Title	Writer(s)	Length
1.	"Honey"	Bobby Russell	4:13
2.	"It's My Way"	Webb Pierce; Wayne Walker	2:18
3.	"Don't Come Home a Drinkin' (With Lovin' on Your Mind)"	Loretta Lynn; Peggy Sue Wells	2:04
4.	"Cry, Cry Again"	Liz Anderson; Dick Land	2:41
5.	"Joey"	Don Chapel	2:26

Side two, disc one
No.	Title	Writer(s)	Length
1.	"Where Could You Go (But to Her)"	Billy Sherrill; Glenn Sutton	3:01
2.	"Good"	Sherrill; Sutton	2:23
3.	"Ode to Billie Joe"	Bobbie Gentry	4:16
4.	"I Believe"	Ervin Drake; Irvin Graham; Jimmy Shirl; Al Stillman	2:14
5.	"Don't Touch Me"	Hank Cochran	2:44

Side one, disc two
No.	Title	Writer(s)	Length
1.	"Yesterday"	Lennon–McCartney	1:58
2.	"My Arms Stay Open Late"	Dan Lomax; Curly Putman	2:10
3.	"I Stayed Long Enough"	Tammy Wynette	2:01
4.	"There Goes My Everything"	Dallas Frazier	2:39
5.	"Crying in the Chapel"	Artie Glenn	2:25

Side two, disc two
No.	Title	Writer(s)	Length
1.	"Kiss Away"	Sherrill; Sutton	2:27
2.	"Cry"	Churchill Kohlman	2:47
3.	"The Legend of Bonnie and Clyde"	Merle Haggard; Bonnie Owens	2:46
4.	"It Is No Secret"	Stuart Hamblen	2:29
5.	"Walk Through This World with Me"	Sandy Seamons; Kay Savage	2:41

== Charts ==
Chart (1970)	Peak position
US Billboard 200	145
US Top Country Albums (Billboard)	8

== Release history ==
Region	Date	Format	Label	Ref.
Australia	May 1970	Vinyl	Epic Records	
North America	May 1970	Vinyl; cassette	Epic Records	
North America	March 17, 2009	Compact disc	Wounded Bird Records	
North America	2010s	Music download; streaming	Sony Music Entertainment	
