= Rock Me Back to Little Rock (song) =

Single by Jan Howard

from the album Rock Me Back to Little Rock
- B-side: "I'll Go Where You Go"
- Released: February 1970
- Genre: Country
- Length: 2:19
- Label: Decca
- Songwriter(s): Lola Jean Dillon
- Producer(s): Owen Bradley

Jan Howard singles chronology
"If It's All the Same to You" (1969)	"Rock Me Back to Little Rock" (1970)	"Someday We'll Be Together" (1970)

"Rock Me Back to Little Rock" is a song written by Lola Jean Dillon that was originally recorded by American country artist Jan Howard. Released as a single by Decca Records, it reached the top 40 of the US country songs chart in 1970. It was later included on her studio album of the same name. The song received a positive response from Cash Box magazine following its release.

== Background and recording ==
The wife of country music songwriter, Harlan Howard, Jan Howard had her own recording career with her husband's help. Her first chart singles included "The One You Slip Around With" (1960), but her singing career became more successful after signing later in the 1960s with Decca Records. There, she had a series of top ten, top 20 and top 40 singles into the 1970s. Among them was the song "Rock Me Back to Little Rock". The uptempo track was composed by Lola Jean Dillon and was produced by Owen Bradley.

== Release, critical reception and chart performance ==
"Rock Me Back to Little Rock" was released as a single by Decca Records in February 1970. It was distributed as a seven-inch vinyl record featuring the B-side "Hello Stranger". The song was named among Cash Box magazine's "Best Best" in February 1970, calling it a "lively finger snapper". Billboard magazine predicted the song would make their country chart. This was proven fact when the track made its debut on the US Billboard Hot Country Songs chart on March 21, 1970. It spent ten weeks there, rising to the number 26 position on May 2. It was Howard's seventeenth top 40 single on the Billboard country chart. The song served as the title track to Howard's 1970 studio album.

== Track listing ==
7" vinyl single

- "Rock Me Back to Little Rock" – 2:19
- "Hello Stranger" – 2:15

== Charts ==
Weekly chart performance for "Rock Me Back to Little Rock"
Chart (1970)	Peak position
US Hot Country Songs (Billboard)	26
