= Love Is a Sometimes Thing =

Studio album by Bill Anderson
- Released: June 1970
- Recorded: 1968–1970
- Studios: Bradley's Barn, Mt. Juliet, Tennessee
- Genres: Country; Nashville Sound
- Label: Decca
- Producer: Owen Bradley

Bill Anderson chronology
If It's All the Same to You (1970)	Love Is a Sometimes Thing (1970)	Where Have All Our Heroes Gone (1970)

Singles from Love Is a Sometimes Thing
- 1. "Love Is a Sometimes Thing" Released: January 1970

Love Is a Sometimes Thing is a studio album by American country singer-songwriter Bill Anderson. It was released in June 1970 on Decca Records and was produced by Owen Bradley. It was Anderson's fourteenth studio album since signing with the Decca label in 1958. Its only single, the title track, would become a major hit on the Billboard country chart in 1970. The album itself would also reach peak positions on the country albums chart following its release.

== Background and content ==
Love Is a Sometimes Thing was recorded between 1968 and 1970 at Bradley's Barn studio in Mount Juliet, Tennessee. The studio was owned by the album's producer, Owen Bradley. The album would be Anderson's fourteenth studio recording as well as his fourteenth to be produced by Bradley. The album consisted of 11 songs. Four of the album's tracks were written by Anderson himself. Among the song-composed tunes was the track, "You and Your Sweet Love". This song would become a major hit for Connie Smith around the same time. The title track was written by Jan Howard, a frequent collaborator of Anderson's. Howard would later cut her own version for her 1970 album Rock Me Back to Little Rock. The album also included cover versions of previously recorded songs. Among these tracks was Glen Campbell's "Honey Come Back". Another track was "My Elusive Dreams", originally recorded as a duet between David Houston and Tammy Wynette.

== Release and reception ==
Professional ratings
Review scores
Source	Rating
Allmusic	3.5/5 stars
Billboard	Favorable

Love Is a Sometimes Thing was released in June 1970 on Decca Records. It was issued as a vinyl LP, with six songs on side one and five songs on side two. After spending 15 weeks on the Billboard Top Country Albums chart, the record peaked at number ten in August 1970. It became one of several top ten Billboard albums for Anderson.

The title track was released as a single in January 1970. The song reached number five on the Billboard Hot Country Singles chart in May, after spending 15 weeks on the chart. The song also peaked at number ten on the RPM Country Singles chart in Canada, becoming his fifth consecutive solo top-ten hit on that chart. Love Is a Sometimes Thing received a positive response from critics. Billboard gave it a positive response in its June 1970 issue of the magazine. "Here's a top-of-the-album chart winner for Anderson," writers commented. The album would later be reviewed by Allmusic, who gave it a rating of 3.5 stars.

== Track listing ==
Side one
No.	Title	Writer(s)	Length
1.	"Love Is a Sometimes Thing"	Jan Howard	3:01
2.	"Honey Come Back"	Jimmy Webb	2:35
3.	"You Can Change My World"	Ben Peters	2:35
4.	"I Don't Have Anyplace to Go"	Anderson	2:27
5.	"Daddy What If"	Shel Silverstein	2:31
6.	"You and Your Sweet Love"	Anderson	2:48

Side two
No.	Title	Writer(s)	Length
1.	"Not Really Living at All"	Del Trolinder; Carl Watson	2:42
2.	"The Shirt"	Anderson; George Bailey; Mike Strickland	2:47
3.	"I'll Live for You"	Anderson	2:25
4.	"My Elusive Dreams"	Curly Putman; Billy Sherrill	2:59
5.	"And I'm Still Missing You"	Jim Glaser; Jimmy Payne	2:23

== Personnel ==
All credits are adapted from the liner notes of Love Is a Sometimes Thing.

Musical personnel

- Bill Anderson – lead vocals
- Harold Bradley – guitar
- Steve Chapman – guitar
- Johnny Gimble – mandolin, clarinet
- Roy Huskey – bass
- The Jordanaires – background vocals
- Grady Martin – guitar
- Len Miller – drums
- Hal Rugg – steel guitar
- Jerry Smith – piano
- Jimmy Wilson – guitar
- Jimmy Woodard – organ

Technical personnel

- Owen Bradley – record producer

== Chart performance ==
Chart (1970)	Peak position
US Top Country Albums (Billboard)	10

== Release history ==
Region	Date	Format	Label	Ref.
United States	June 1970	Vinyl	Decca	
Canada	June 1970	Vinyl	Decca	
