= We Had All the Good Things Going =

Single by Jan Howard

from the album Rock Me Back to Little Rock
- B-side: "I'll Go Where You Go"
- Released: August 1969
- Genre: Country
- Length: 2:30
- Label: Decca
- Songwriter(s): Mervin Shiner; Jerry Monday
- Producer(s): Owen Bradley

Jan Howard singles chronology
"When We Tried" (1969)	"We Had All the Good Things Going" (1969)	"If It's All the Same to You" (1969)

"We Had All the Good Things Going" is a song written by Mervin Shiner and Jerry Monday that was originally recorded by American country artist Jan Howard. Released as a single, it made the top 20 of the US country songs chart in 1969. It later appeared on her 1970 studio album Rock Me Back to Little Rock. The song received reviews from Billboard and Cash Box magazines.

== Background and recording ==
Jan Howard was married to country music songwriter Harlan Howard for several years. With his assistance, she got a recording contract and found commercial success with "The One You Slip Around With". She then moved to Decca Records where she had several top ten, top 20 and top 40 singles like "Evil on Your Mind" and "My Son". Howard continued having chart records into the 1970s, among them was "We Had All the Good Things Going". The song was composed by Mervin Shiner and Jerry Monday. It featured uptempo production from Owen Bradley.

== Release, critical reception and chart performance ==
"We Had All the Good Things Going" was released as a single by Decca Records in August 1969. It was issued as a seven-inch vinyl record featuring a B-side: "I'll Go Where You Go". Cash Box called Howard's singing "strong voiced" and wrote of the song itself, "Catchy tune is sure to pick up loads of air play leading to big sales." Billboard called its rhythm "infectious" and found Howard had a "fine performance" and the material to be "first-rate". The publication also predicted the single would reach their country chart top 20. Their prediction was proven factual that year. "We Had All the Good Things Going" made its debut on the US Billboard Hot Country Songs chart on September 20, 1969 and spent nine weeks there. On November 1, the song peaked at the number 20 position, becoming Howard's seventh top 20 single in her career. The track was the lead single to Howard's 1970 studio album Rock Me Back to Little Rock.

== Track listing ==
7" vinyl single

- "We Had All the Good Things Going" – 2:30
- "I'll Go Where You Go" – 2:40

== Charts ==
Weekly chart performance for "We Had All the Good Things Going"
Chart (1969)	Peak position
US Hot Country Songs (Billboard)	20
