= From Me to You (Charley Pride album) =

Studio album by Charley Pride
- Released: January 1971
- Studio: RCA Victor, Nashville, Tennessee
- Genre: Country
- Label: RCA Victor
- Producer: Jack Clement

Charley Pride chronology
Christmas in My Home Town (1970)	From Me to You (1971)	Did You Think to Pray (1971)

Singles from From Me to You
- 1. "Wonder Could I Live There Anymore" Released: May 1970; 2. "I Can't Believe That You've Stopped Loving Me" Released: September 1970

From Me to You is the tenth studio album by American country music artist Charley Pride. It was released in 1971 on the RCA Victor label (catalog no. LSP-4468).

The album was awarded three stars from the web site AllMusic. It debuted on the Billboard's country album chart on January 30, 1971, peaked at No. 2, and remained on the chart for 37 weeks. The album also included two No. 1 hit singles: "I Can't Believe That You've Stopped Loving Me" and "Wonder Could I Live There Anymore".

== Track listing ==
No.	Title	Writer(s)	Length
1.	"That's the Only Way Life's Good to Me"	David Wilkins	2:29
2.	"I Can't Believe That You've Stopped Loving Me"	A.L. "Doodle" Owens, Dallas Frazier	3:06
3.	"(There's Still) Someone I Can't Forget"	Johnny Duncan	2:30
4.	"Sweet Promises"	Duane Valentry	2:02
5.	"Was It All Worth Losing You"	Audie Murphy	2:50
6.	"Fifteen Years Ago"	Raymond Smith	3:10
7.	"Wonder Could I Live There Anymore"	Bill Rice	2:35
8.	"Piroque Joe"	Roy Botkin	1:53
9.	"Time You're Not a Friend of Mine"	Sue Lane	2:08
10.	"Today Is That Tomorrow"	Gene Strasser, George Winter	2:58

== Charts ==
Chart performance for From Me to You
Chart (1971)	Peak position
US Billboard 200	42
US Top Country Albums (Billboard)	2

== See also ==
- Charley Pride discography
