= That Nashville Music =

American television series (1970–1985)

That Nashville Music (originally titled That Good Ole Nashville Music) is an American television program featuring country music artists performing their biggest hits of the day. The series aired in syndication from 1970 to 1985.

Early in the series' run it was hosted by country artist Dave Dudley, and featured two or three artists per episode, from the legends to current superstars to up-and-coming acts. In later years each episode was hosted by a different artist, with two other artists featured. Each episode also featured a clogging routine, most often performed by The Rutherford County Square Dancers or the Melvin Sloan Dancers or Ralph Sloan and the Tennessee Travelers.

The series was distributed by Show Biz Inc. and produced at Opryland USA in Nashville, Tennessee. Purina Dog Chow was the show's sponsor.

Selected reruns of the show have aired on RFD-TV.

== Sources ==
- Hal Erickson. "Syndicated Television: The First Forty Years, 1947–1987. McFarland & Co. Inc. Publishers, Jefferson, North Carolina, 1989. ISBN 0-89950-410-8.
