= If It's All the Same to You =

Single by Bill Anderson and Jan Howard

from the album If It's All the Same to You
- B-side: "I Thank God for You"
- Released: October 1969
- Genre: Country
- Label: Decca
- Songwriter: Bill Anderson
- Producer: Owen Bradley

Bill Anderson singles chronology
"My Life (Throw It Away If I Want To)" (1969)	"If It's All the Same to You" (1969)	"But You Know I Love You" (1969)

Jan Howard singles chronology
"We Had All the Good Things Going" (1969)	"If It's All the Same to You" (1969)	"Rock Me Back to Little Rock" (1970)

"If It's All the Same to You" is a single by American country music artists Bill Anderson and Jan Howard. Released in October 1969, it was the first single and title track from their album If It's All the Same to You. The song reached #2 on the Billboard Hot Country Singles chart. The single became the duo's fourth charted duet. The song additionally peaked at #8 on the Canadian RPM Country Tracks chart.

== Chart performance ==
Chart (1969–1970)	Peak position
U.S. Billboard Hot Country Singles	2
CAN RPM Country Tracks	8
