= Love Is a Sometimes Thing (song) =

Single by Bill Anderson and the Po' Boys

from the album Love Is a Sometimes Thing
- B-side: "And I'm Still Missing You"
- Released: January 1970
- Recorded: October 21, 1969
- Studio: Bradley Studio
- Genre: Country; Nashville Sound
- Length: 3:01
- Label: Decca
- Songwriter: Jan Howard
- Producer: Owen Bradley

Bill Anderson and the Po' Boys singles chronology
"But You Know I Love You" (1969)	"Love Is a Sometimes Thing" (1970)	"Where Have All Our Heroes Gone" (1970)

"Love Is a Sometimes Thing" is a song written by Jan Howard. It was first recorded by American country singer-songwriter Bill Anderson. It was released as a single in 1970 via Decca Records and became a major hit the same year.

== Background and release ==
"Love Is a Sometimes Thing" was recorded on October 21, 1969, at the Bradley Studio, located in Nashville, Tennessee. The sessions were produced by Owen Bradley, who would serve as Anderson's producer through most of years with Decca Records. Two additional tracks were recorded during the same recording session: "Not Really Living at All" and "I Don't Have Any Place to Go." The song's composer, Jan Howard, was a frequent musical collaborator of Anderson's. Together, they co-wrote Connie Smith's 1970 hit "I Never Once Stopped Loving You." The pair also recorded several duets together, including the number one hit "For Loving You."

"Love Is a Sometimes Thing" was released as a single by Decca Records in January 1970. Anderson's backing band, The Po' Boys, received equal billing on the single's release. The song spent 15 weeks on the Billboard Hot Country Singles before reaching number five in May 1970. In Canada, the single reached number 10 on the RPM Country Songs chart. It was later released on his 1970 studio album, also called Love Is a Sometimes Thing.

== Track listings ==
7" vinyl single

- "Love Is a Sometimes Thing" – 3:01
- "And I'm Still Missing You" – 2:23

== Chart performance ==
Chart (1970)	Peak position
Canada Country Songs (RPM)	10
US Hot Country Songs (Billboard)	5
