= Hello Darlin' (song) =

Single by Conway Twitty

from the album Hello Darlin'
- B-side: "Girl at the Bar"
- Released: March 23, 1970; 56 years ago
- Recorded: November 18, 1969; 56 years ago
- Studio: Bradley's Barn, Mount Juliet, Tennessee
- Genre: Country
- Length: 2:29
- Label: Decca 32661
- Songwriter: Conway Twitty
- Producer: Owen Bradley

Conway Twitty singles chronology
"That's When She Started to Stop Loving You" (1970)	"Hello Darlin'" (1970)	"Fifteen Years Ago" (1970)

"Hello Darlin'" is a song written and recorded by American country music artist Conway Twitty. It was released in March 1970 as the first single and title track from the album Hello Darlin. The song was Twitty's fourth No. 1 song on the Billboard magazine Hot Country Singles chart. The song spent four weeks atop the Billboard Hot Country Singles chart that summer, and was named the No. 1 song of 1970. Aside from being Twitty's standard concert opener, the song became a country standard as well as his signature song. When performing with Loretta Lynn, Twitty would frequently sing the song directly to Loretta. Twitty's recording was added to the Grammy Hall of Fame in 1999.

== Background and writing ==
During Twitty's lifetime, two songs became closely associated with him: "It's Only Make Believe" and "Hello Darlin'." The latter song would become the song Twitty used to open his concerts.

While recording the song in 1969, Twitty felt dissatisfied with the opening line he had written. Record producer Owen Bradley suggested speaking the line: "Hello darlin', nice to see you." The result was a hook that made the song instantly recognizable to fans.

== Content ==
The song is about a man who runs into an old flame and, after acknowledging to her "You're just as lovely as you used to be," tries to put up his bravado by saying he's getting along fine without her, "except," he admits, "I can't sleep, and I cry all night 'til dawn." He then details his deep sorrow for his mistakes that led to the breakup of their relationship, then – after sharing an embrace "just for old time's sake" – bids her well. Before the second half, he says that if she would forgive him, he'll be waiting for her.

== Personnel ==
- Conway Twitty — lead vocals
- Joe E. Lewis, The Anita Kerr Singers — background vocals
- Harold Bradley — electric 6-string bass guitar
- Grady Martin — electric guitar
- Larry Butler — piano
- Ray Edenton — acoustic guitar
- John Hughey — steel guitar
- Tommy Markham — drums
- Bob Moore — bass

== Chart performance ==
Chart (1970)	Peak position
US Hot Country Songs (Billboard)	1
US Billboard Hot 100	60
Canadian RPM Country Tracks	2

=== Certifications ===
Region	Certification	Certified units/sales
United States (RIAA) Original 1970 Release	Platinum	1,000,000^{‡}
United States (RIAA) Mastertone	Gold	500,000^{*}
^{*} Sales figures based on certification alone.^{‡} Sales+streaming figures based on certification alone.

== "Privet Radost" ==
On July 17, 1975, as part of the Apollo-Soyuz Test Project, a Russian language version of the song called "Privet Radost" was played by the American astronauts (of the Apollo crew) to Russian cosmonauts (of the Soyuz crew) as "a gesture of goodwill". Twitty worked with a language professor from the University of Oklahoma to record the phonetic Russian version of the song.

"Privet Radost" was released as a special edition single in 1975, and did not chart. It is available on the box set The Conway Twitty Collection.

== Cover versions ==
A cover version of "Hello Darlin'" was recorded in 1993 by George Jones as a track on his 1993 album High Tech Redneck, and was considered to be part of Jones' tribute to Twitty (who had died earlier in the year). Jones had also recorded a cover version in 1972.

Other artists who recorded cover versions include Lynn Anderson, Bobby Bare, Wanda Jackson, Jason Molina, Daniel O'Donnell, Stu Phillips, Charlie Rich, Scotty McCreery, Songs: Ohia and Charley Pride.

Loretta Lynn recorded a cover of the song on her 1971 album Coal Miner's Daughter. The song was featured at the end of the 2021 film Paranormal Activity: Next of Kin.

== In popular culture ==
A video clip of Twitty singing "Hello Darlin'" on the television show Hee Haw was used at the end of the Family Guy episode "Peter's Daughter". This was also the song that Tyra and Tim danced to in the finale of the TV show Friday Night Lights.
