= Jimmy Arthur Ordge =

Canadian country music singer and musician (1935–2016)

- Born: James Arthur Ordge; 1935; Donalda, Alberta, Canada
- Died: July 1, 2016 (aged 80) Edmonton, Alberta
- Genres: Rockabilly, country
- Occupations: Singer-songwriter, musician
- Years active: 1961–1981
- Labels: Quality Records, Decca Records, Apex Records, Damon Records, MCA Coral, Royalty Records, Dore Records

James Arthur Ordge (1935 – July 1, 2016) was a Canadian country music recording artist.

Ordge scored two Canadian Number-One country singles with his 1967 release “Irena Cheyenne” and his 1970 release “The Ballad of Muk Tuk Annie”. He was a Country Male Vocalist of the Year nominee for the Juno Awards of 1978. His 1981 Doré Records single release, “Stay Away From Jim”, made the US Billboard Hot Country Songs chart, peaking at number 89 on July 24, 1981.

Ordge died of cancer on July 1, 2016, at age 80.

== Honours ==
In 2021 Ordge was inducted posthumously into the Country Music Alberta Hall of Fame.

== Notable recordings ==
- “Easy Rockin Chair”, Quality Records (1961)
- “Irena Cheyenne”, Decca Records (1967)
- “Chilly Winds”, Apex (1968) (#28 Can.)
- “She's Dreaming Again”, Apex (1969) (#46 Can.)
- “The Ballad of Muk Tuk Annie” Damon Records (1970)
- “Mail Order Bride”, Damon Records (1971) (#28 Can.)
- “Big Gray Walls”, Quality Records (1973) (#46 Can.)
- “The Old Man”, Royalty Records (1975) (#26 Can.)
- “Just One Night Of Love”, Royalty Records (1976) (#30 Can.)
- “Herschel's Hemi Half-Ton”, Royalty Records (1976) (#41 Can.)
- “Dawson City (The Ballad Of)”, Royalty Records (1978) (#39 Can.)
- “Stay Away From Jim” Dore Records (1981)
