= If It's All the Same to You (album) =

Studio album by Bill Anderson and Jan Howard
- Released: March 1970
- Recorded: 1965 – 1970
- Studios: Bradley's Barn, Mt. Juliet, Tennessee; Columbia, Nashville, Tennessee
- Genre: Country
- Label: Decca
- Producer: Owen Bradley

Bill Anderson chronology
Christmas (1969)	If It's All the Same to You (1970)	Love Is a Sometimes Thing (1970)

Jan Howard chronology
For God and Country (1970)	If It's All the Same to You (1970)	Rock Me Back to Little Rock (1970)

Singles from If It's All the Same to You
- 1. "I Know You're Married (But I Love You Still)" Released: December 1965; 2. "If It's All the Same to You" Released: October 1969

If It's All the Same to You is a studio album by American country music artists Bill Anderson and Jan Howard. The album was released on Decca Records in March 1970 and was produced by Owen Bradley. It was the pair's second collaborative album after several years of performing together on tour and on television. The album's title track became a major hit on the Billboard country chart, reaching the top 10. Additionally, the album itself would reach peak positions on the Billboard country albums chart.

== Background and content ==
If It's All the Same to You was recorded in several sessions between 1965 and 1970 at both the Columbia Recording Studios and Bradley's Barn. All sessions were produced by Owen Bradley, whom Anderson and Howard had recorded with previously. The album consisted of 11 tracks. Many of these tracks were composed and previously cut by Anderson himself. This included the songs "The Untouchables", "Who Is the Biggest Fool" and "Tell It Like It Was". The album also featured cover versions of songs recorded by other artists. Its second track was a cover of Jackie DeShannon's "Put a Little Love in Your Heart" and its eighth track was a cover of Ivory Joe Hunter's "Since I Met You Baby".

The album's liner notes were written by booking agent, Hubert Long. Long noted the pair's previous work together on Anderson's syndicated television show, as well as their previous collaborative work together. Long is also praised Anderson's vocals, calling them "mellow" while calling Howard's voice "sensitive", creating a "perfect harmony".

== Release and reception ==
If It's All the Same to You was first released in March 1970 on Decca Records in a vinyl record format, featuring 6 songs on one side and 5 songs on the flip side of the record. The album peaked at number 25 on the Billboard Top Country Albums chart in May 1970. The album's title track was the one of three singles featured in the album. It peaked at number 2 on the Billboard Hot Country Singles chart in January 1970, the duo's second top 10 hit on that chart. The single also reached number 8 on the Canadian RPM Country Tracks chart in 1970. The album also included the single "I Know You're Married (But I Love You Still)". The song was originally issued as a trial single in 1965, reaching a minor position on the Billboard country songs chart that year.

If It's All the Same to You was given 2.5 out of 5 stars on Allmusic.

== Track listing ==
Side one
No.	Title	Writer(s)	Length
1.	"If It's All the Same to You"	Bill Anderson	2:42
2.	"Put a Little Love in Your Heart"	Jackie DeShannon; Jimmy Holiday; Randy Myers	2:20
3.	"The Untouchables"	Anderson	2:35
4.	"Together We're One"	Martin Greene; Jim Weed	1:50
5.	"A Truer Love You'll Never Find"	Red Lane	2:13
6.	"Who Is the Biggest Fool"	Anderson	2:17

Side two
No.	Title	Writer(s)	Length
1.	"Tell It Like It Was"	Anderson	2:47
2.	"Since I Met You Baby"	Ivory Joe Hunter	2:52
3.	"I Know You're Married (But I Love You Still)"	Mack Magaha; Don Reno	2:30
4.	"I'm Leaving It Up to You"	Don Harris; Dewey Terry	2:02
5.	"Time Out"	Harlan Howard; Richard Johnson	2:34

== Personnel ==
All credits are adapted from the liner notes of If It's All the Same to You.

Musical and technical personnel

- Harold Bradley – guitar
- Owen Bradley – producer
- Bill Anderson – lead vocals
- Steve Chapman – guitar
- The Jordanaires – background vocals
- Grady Martin – guitar
- Jan Howard – lead vocals
- Roy Huskey – bass
- Len Miller – drums
- Hal Rugg – steel guitar
- Jimmy Wilson – guitar
- Jimmy Woodard – organ

== Chart performance ==
Chart (1970)	Peak position
US Top Country Albums (Billboard)	25

== Release history ==
Region	Date	Format	Label	Ref.
Canada	1979	Vinyl	Pickwick	
United Kingdom	1970	Vinyl	MCA	
United States	1970	Vinyl	Decca	
