= I'll See Him Through =

Single by Tammy Wynette

from the album Tammy's Touch
- B-side: "Enough of a Woman"
- Released: December 1969
- Recorded: November 1969
- Studio: Columbia Studio B (Nashville, Tennessee)
- Genre: Country
- Length: 2:51
- Label: Epic
- Songwriters: Billy Sherrill; Norro Wilson
- Producer: Billy Sherrill

Tammy Wynette singles chronology
"The Ways to Love a Man" (1969)	"I'll See Him Through" (1969)	"He Loves Me All the Way" (1970)

"I'll See Him Through" is a song written by Billy Sherrill and Norro Wilson, and recorded by American country music artist Tammy Wynette. It was released in December 1969 as the first single from the album Tammy's Touch.

== Background and reception ==
"I'll See Him Through" was first recorded in November 1969 at Columbia Studio B (the "Quonset hut studio") in Nashville, Tennessee. Additional tracks were recorded during this session, which would ultimately become part of Wynette's studio album Tammy's Touch. The session was produced by Billy Sherrill and the song was issued as a single in December 1969.

The song reached number 2 on the Billboard Hot Country Singles chart and number 100 on the Billboard Hot 100 chart in 1969. "I'll See Him Through" became Wynette's ninth top 10 hit on the country songs chart. It was released on her studio album Tammy's Touch.

== Track listings ==
7" vinyl single

- "I'll See Him Through" – 2:51
- "Enough of a Woman" – 2:05

== Charts ==
=== Weekly charts ===
Chart (1969–1970)	Peak position
US Hot 100 (Billboard)	100
US Hot Country Singles (Billboard)	2
AUS Top Singles (Kent Music Report)	91
CAN Country Singles (RPM)	2
