= Tammy's Touch =

Studio album by Tammy Wynette
- Released: April 27, 1970
- Recorded: November 1969 – February 1970
- Studios: Columbia Studio B (Nashville, Tennessee)
- Genres: Country; Nashville Sound
- Label: Epic
- Producer: Billy Sherrill

Tammy Wynette chronology
The Ways to Love a Man (1970)	Tammy's Touch (1970)	The World of Tammy Wynette (1970)

Singles from Tammy's Touch
- 1. "I'll See Him Through" Released: December 1969; 2. "He Loves Me All the Way" Released: April 1970

Tammy's Touch is a studio album by American country artist, Tammy Wynette. It was released on April 27, 1970, via Epic Records and contained 11 tracks. The album's material centered around themes of heartbreak and romance. Many of the album's songs were new recordings while others were covers. Among its new recordings was the singles "I'll See Him Through" and "He Loves Me All the Way". Both songs became chart-topping tracks on the country music charts in 1970. The album itself also reached top positions on multiple charts in the United States.

== Background ==
Tammy Wynette was among country music's most popular artists during the sixties and seventies decades. She had a series of number one and top ten country songs, including 1969's "Stand by Your Man". Considered her signature recording, "Stand by Your Man" described how women stayed loyal to their husbands despite their many faults. The song elevated Wynette's popularity and helped craft an image that resonated for years on singles and albums. Among the follow-up singles were "I'll See Him Through" and "He Loves Me All the Way". Both songs followed a similar theme to "Stand by Your Man" and would help craft Wynette's 1970 studio LP, Tammy's Touch.

== Recording and content ==
Tammy's Touch was recorded in sessions between November 1969 and February 1970. The recording sessions were held at Columbia Studio B (the "Quonset Hut Studio"), located in Nashville, Tennessee. The album was produced by Billy Sherrill. A total of 11 tracks comprised the studio album. The song's themes centered around heartbreak. This included tracks like "The Divorce Sale" and "He Thinks I Love Him". Other songs followed similar themes to "Stand by Your Man", such as the track "He Loves Me All the Way". In the song, a housewife explains that she can trust her husband even though she is not always sure if he is remaining faithful. Many of the album's tracks were penned especially for Wynette. These songs were chosen by Billy Sherrill and some were penned by him as well. The album featured three Sherrill compositions: "I'll See Him Through", "He Loves Me All the Way" and "A Lighter Shade of Blue". Two tracks were also written with Glenn Sutton: "Love Me, Love Me" and "A Lighter Shade of Blue". Also featured was a cover of the Brook Benton pop song, "It's Just a Matter of Time". It was also covered by Sonny James around the same time, whose version became a chart-topping country single.

== Release, chart performance, reception and singles ==
Professional ratings
Review scores
Source	Rating
Allmusic	4/5 stars

Tammy's Touch was first released on April 27, 1970, on Epic Records. It was eighth studio album recorded by Wynette during her career. It was initially released as both a vinyl LP and a cassette. In 1973, it was re-released to the United Kingdom under the title Superb Country Sounds. The cover photo and track listing were identical to the original. It was released digitally by Sony Music decades later. Stephen Thomas Erlewine of AllMusic gave Tammy's Touch a positive review, rating it four out of five stars. He highlighted Billy's Sherrill's production along with the album's material, concluding that it was "one of her most satisfying albums of the '70s." The album went to number one on the American Billboard Top Country Albums chart in 1970, becoming her second chart-topping LP. It also became her fifth studio album to place on the Billboard 200 chart, reaching number 85.

Two singles were included on Tammy's Touch. The first was "I'll See Him Through", which was initially released in December 1969. The single went to number two on the Billboard Hot Country Songs chart in March 1970. It also went to number three on the Canadian RPM Country Tracks chart in early 1970. Also included was the single "He Loves Me All the Way", which was first issued by Epic Records in April 1970. It topped by the Billboard country chart in July 1970 and went to number two on the RPM country chart. Both singles also reached the Billboard Hot 100, both climbing into the top 90.

== Track listing ==
Side one
No.	Title	Writer(s)	Length
1.	"I'll See Him Through"	Billy Sherrill; Norro Wilson	2:51
2.	"Love Me, Love Me"	George Richey; Glenn Sutton	2:23
3.	"It's Just a Matter of Time"	Belford Hendricks; Brook Benton; Clyde Otis	2:48
4.	"Cold Lonely Feeling"	Jerry Chesnut	2:51
5.	"The Divorce Sale"	Curly Putman; Greg Putman	2:55

Side two
No.	Title	Writer(s)	Length
1.	"He Loves Me All the Way"	Sherrill; Carmol Taylor; Wilson	2:35
2.	"He Thinks I Love Him"	Taylor	2:25
3.	"Our Last Night Together"	Rita Gist	2:46
4.	"A Lighter Shade of Blue"	Sherrill; Glenn Sutton	1:57
5.	"Lonely Days (And Nights More Lonely)"	Danny Hurd; Tom Moore	2:30
6.	"You Make My Skies Turn Blue"	Jerry Crutchfield	2:35

== Technical personnel ==
All credits are adapted from the liner notes of Tammy's Touch.

- Lou Bradley – engineer
- Charlie Bragg – engineer
- Bill Grine – cover photo, photography
- The Jordanaires – backing vocals
- Curly Putman – liner notes
- Billy Sherrill – producer

== Charts ==
=== Weekly charts ===
Chart (1970)	Peak position
US Billboard 200	85
US Top Country Albums (Billboard)	1

=== Year-end charts ===
Chart (1970)	Position
US Top Country Albums (Billboard)	8

== Release history ==
Region	Date	Format	Label	Ref.
Australia	April 27, 1970	Vinyl	Epic Records	
Japan	April 27, 1970	Vinyl	CBS Records International; Sony Music	
North America	April 27, 1970	Vinyl; cassette	Epic Records	
Europe	1973	Vinyl; cassette	Embassy Records	
North America	2010s	Music download; streaming	Sony Music Entertainment	
