= Louisiana Man =

Single by Connie Smith

from the album I Never Once Stopped Loving You
- B-side: "Alone with You"
- Released: August 1970
- Genre: Country
- Label: RCA Records
- Songwriter(s): Doug Kershaw
- Producer(s): Bob Ferguson

Connie Smith singles chronology
| "I Never Once Stopped Loving You" (1970) | "Louisiana Man" (1970) | "Where Is My Castle" (1970) |

"Louisiana Man" is a song originally written and recorded by American country artist Doug Kershaw in 1961. It peaked at number 10 that year on the Billboard Hot Country Singles chart when Kershaw and his brother released it as Rusty and Doug.

In 1970, American country music artist Connie Smith reached number 14 with a cover version. The single spawned the release of her 1970 studio album I Never Once Stopped Loving You, on which the song was included.

The song was recorded as a single by Jan & Dean in 1966 and was planned to be released on their album Carnival of Sound in 1968, but it was not released until 2010. Other versions were recorded as an album track that year by the Seekers, Rick Nelson, and Gene Pitney. Bobbie Gentry covered the song on a 1968 single. Harpers Bizarre recorded it on their 1967 album Anything Goes. It was also recorded by The Hollies.

The song is repeatedly mentioned in the chorus of the Alabama song "If You're Gonna Play in Texas (You Gotta Have a Fiddle in the Band)".
