= Guy Drake =

- Born: June 24, 1904
- Origin: Weir, Kentucky, U.S.
- Died: June 17, 1984 (aged 79)
- Genres: Country, comedy
- Years active: 1970
- Label: Royal American

Guy Drake (June 24, 1904 – June 17, 1984) was an American country music singer and comedian, best known for his 1970 hit "Welfare Cadilac".

Born in Weir, Kentucky, Drake worked as a painter in the 1960s when he composed his only single, "Welfare Cadilac". According to him, he wrote the song in 1964 after seeing a rundown shack with a billboard on either side and ten children living inside, with a new Cadillac car sitting out front. The song is a satirical account of an impoverished parent living on welfare. After being rejected by several other record labels, it was released in 1970 as the first single from the independent Royal American Records label. The song became a subject of controversy when Richard Nixon, then the President of the United States, asked Johnny Cash to perform the song at the White House, a request Cash refused because he felt the song was degrading to recipients of welfare. The book Welfare in the United States: A History with Documents, 1935–1996 described "Welfare Cadilac" as "premised on stereotypes of welfare recipients as undeserving" and "contrast[ing] hard-working people who pay taxes with welfare recipients who get free commodities and drive brand-new Cadillacs".

"Welfare Cadilac" was commercially successful in both the United States and Canada. The song reached the number 63 position on Billboard Hot 100, as well as the number six position on the same publication's Hot Country Songs charts. It was also commercially successful in Canada, reaching number 66 on the RPM Top Singles charts and number one on the same publication's Country Tracks charts.

"Welfare Cadilac" was also issued on an LP of the same name. The album got a review from Record World magazine which stated "Toothless and grinning like a mule eating briars in the middle of December, Drake recites his way through five self-penned tunes and various other biggies."

Drake died of unknown causes in 1984.

== Discography ==
| Title | Album details |
|---|---|
| Welfare Cadilac | Release date: 1970; Label: Royal American; Format: LP album |

=== Singles ===
| Year | Single | Peak chart positions | | | | Album |
| Year | Single | US | US Country | CAN | CAN Country | Album |
|---|---|---|---|---|---|---|
| 1970 | "Welfare Cadilac" | 63 | 6 | 66 | 1 | Welfare Cadilac |
