= I Never Picked Cotton =

Single by Roy Clark

from the album I Never Picked Cotton
- B-side: "Lonesome Too Long"
- Released: May 1970
- Recorded: 1969
- Genre: Country
- Length: 2:22
- Label: Dot
- Songwriters: Bobby George, Charles Williams

Roy Clark singles chronology
"Right or Left at Oak Street" (1969)	"I Never Picked Cotton" (1970)	"Thank God and Greyhound" (1970)

"I Never Picked Cotton" is a song made famous by country music singer Roy Clark. Written by Bobby George and Charlie Williams, the song was released in 1970 as the title track to the album released that same year. The song peaked at No. 5 on the Billboard magazine Hot Country Singles chart that summer. Charlie Williams wrote several songs that Roy Clark recorded, including "Right or Left at Oak Street."

== Song plot ==
The story is told in first-person narrative from the perspective of an Oklahoma native, the youngest of three children from a destitute sharecropping family. In the song's chorus, the protagonist recalls how his mother, brother and sister all picked cotton while his dad, a coal miner, suffered an untimely death at a young age (the cause of his death not mentioned but implied that it was from his occupation, which has a high mortality rate).

In the first verse, the man recalls his family's past and his own upbringing and swore to himself that once he was old enough, he would leave the farm and his family behind. He eventually made good on his promise in the second verse, stealing ten dollars and a pick-up truck and absconding from his homestead, never to return. From then on the man lived a hedonistic lifestyle replete with "fast cars and whiskey, long-legged girls and fun", which he financed through armed robbery ("I had everything that money could bring, and I took it all with a gun").

In the final verse, the man's reckless lifestyle culminates in aggravated murder while in Memphis when he kills a redneck who accosts and insults him. Arrested and convicted for the crime, the man is sentenced to death by hanging, and the night before his execution, he reflects on his decadent life and notes that, "In the time I've got, there ain't a hell of a lot that I can look back on with pride", except that he kept his promise to himself to "never pick cotton".

== Cover versions ==
A cover version of "I Never Picked Cotton" was recorded by Johnny Cash for his 1996 album Unchained.

== Chart positions ==
=== Roy Clark version ===
Chart (1970)	Peak position
U.S. Billboard Hot Country Singles	5
U.S. Billboard Bubbling Under Hot 100	22
Canadian RPM Country Tracks	2
