= Fifteen Years Ago =

- Japanese release picture sleeve

Single by Conway Twitty

from the album Fifteen Years Ago
- B-side: "Up Comes the Bottle"
- Released: September 1970
- Recorded: April 2, 1970
- Studio: Bradley's Barn, Mount Juliet, Tennessee
- Genre: Country
- Length: 3:10
- Label: Decca
- Songwriter(s): Raymond Smith
- Producer(s): Owen Bradley

Conway Twitty singles chronology
"Hello Darlin'" (1970)	"Fifteen Years Ago" (1970)	"What Am I Living For" (1970)

"Fifteen Years Ago" is a song written by Raymond Smith, and recorded by American country music artist Conway Twitty. It was released in September 1970 as the first single and title track from the album Fifteen Years Ago. The song was Twitty's fifth number one on the U.S. country singles chart. The single stayed at number one for a single week and spent a total of 16 weeks on the chart.

== Content ==
The song is about a man who still thinks about a former girlfriend, with whom he had broken up 15 years earlier after a deep, emotional relationship. His memories of the past are triggered when he runs into an old friend who mentions the ex-girlfriend's name, and despite his best efforts to make his wife happy he is troubled by his persisting thoughts of the past relationship.

== Personnel ==
- Conway Twitty — vocals
- Joe E. Lewis, The Jordanaires — background vocals
- Harold Bradley — electric 6-string bass guitar
- Grady Martin — electric guitar
- Larry Butler — piano
- Ray Edenton — acoustic guitar
- John Hughey — steel guitar
- Tommy Markham — drums and percussion
- Bob Moore — bass

== Covers and parodies ==
"Fifteen Years Ago" was also recorded by other country music artists including:

- Charley Pride on his 1971 album From Me to You
- The Statler Brothers for their Bed of Rose's album in 1970.
- In 1971, comedian Sheb Wooley, recording under his alias Ben Colder, recorded a parody of the song called "Fifteen Beers Ago."
- John Prine and Lee Ann Womack recorded a duet version of Fifteen Years Ago for Prine's 2016 album, For Better, Or Worse.

== Chart performance ==
Chart (1970)	Peak position
US Hot Country Songs (Billboard)	1
US Billboard Hot 100	81
Canadian RPM Country Tracks	1
