= Tennessee Bird Walk =

Single by Jack Blanchard & Misty Morgan

from the album Birds of a Feather
- B-side: "The Clock of St. James"
- Released: early 1970
- Studio: Woodland (Nashville, Tennessee)
- Genre: Country
- Length: 2:52
- Label: Wayside 010
- Songwriter: Jack Blanchard
- Producer: Little Richie Johnson

Jack Blanchard & Misty Morgan singles chronology
"Big Black Bird (Spirit of Our Love)" (1969)	"Tennessee Bird Walk" (1970)	"Humphrey the Camel" (1970)

"Tennessee Bird Walk" is a 1970 novelty single by the country music husband-and-wife duo Jack Blanchard & Misty Morgan. The single was the duo's second release on the country charts and became their most successful single. "Tennessee Bird Walk" went to number one on the country charts for two weeks and spent a total of sixteen weeks on the chart. The single also crossed over to the Top 40 peaking at number twenty-three.

== Content ==
"Tennessee Bird Walk" is a novelty song theorizing on the effects of removing the wings, feathers, singing ability, and common sense from birds, along with birdbaths and the trees in which the birds reside, and then restoring them all. According to the first verse, the removals will result in "bald headed birds […] walking southward in their dirty underwear".

== Chart performance ==
Chart (1970)	Peak position
U.S. Billboard Hot Country Singles	1
U.S. Billboard Hot 100	23
Australian (Kent Music Report)	3
Canadian RPM Country Tracks	1
Canadian RPM Top Singles	12
New Zealand (Listener)	4
