= She's a Little Bit Country =

- Japanese release picture sleeve

Single by George Hamilton IV

from the album Back Where It's At
- B-side: "My Nova Scotia Home"
- Released: March 1970
- Genre: Country
- Label: RCA
- Songwriter: Harlan Howard

George Hamilton IV singles chronology
"Carolina in My Mind" (1969)	"She's a Little Bit Country" (1970)	"Back Where It's At" (1970)

"She's a Little Bit Country" is a single by American country music artist George Hamilton IV. Released in March 1970, it was the second single from his album Back Where It's At. The song peaked at number 3 on the Billboard Hot Country Singles chart. It also reached number 1 on the RPM Country Tracks chart in Canada.

== Other versions ==
The single was covered by singer Dean Martin, reaching No. 36 on Billboard's Easy Listening chart, May 1971, and it stayed on the chart for 2 weeks. On the Cashbox chart it peaked at No. 121. The single was from his country album, For the Good Times.

== Charts ==
George Hamilton IV
Chart (1970)	Peak position
US Billboard Hot Country Singles	3
Canadian RPM Country Tracks	1

Dean Martin
Chart (1971)	Peak position
US Cashbox Top 100 Singles	121
US Billboard Easy Listening	36
