= Run, Woman, Run =

Single by Tammy Wynette

from the album The First Lady
- B-side: "My Daddy Doll"
- Released: August 1970
- Studio: Columbia Studio B (Nashville, Tennessee)
- Genre: Country
- Length: 2:25
- Label: Epic
- Songwriter(s): Ann Booth; Duke Goff; Dan Hoffman
- Producer(s): Billy Sherrill

Tammy Wynette singles chronology
"He Loves Me All the Way" (1970)	"Run, Woman, Run" (1970)	"The Wonders You Perform" (1970)

"Run Woman Run" is a song written by Ann Booth, Duke Goff and Dan Hoffman, and recorded by American country music artist Tammy Wynette. It was released in August 1970 as a single from the album The First Lady. The song went to number one on the country charts, where it spent two weeks at the top and a total of thirteen weeks on the country charts.

== Chart performance ==
Chart (1970)	Peak position
U.S. Billboard Hot Country Singles	1
U.S. Billboard Hot 100	92
Canadian RPM Country Tracks	1
