= Back Where It's At =

Single by George Hamilton IV

from the album Back Where It's At
- B-side: "Then I Miss You"
- Released: August 1970
- Genre: Country
- Length: 2:44
- Label: RCA

George Hamilton IV singles chronology
"She's a Little Bit Country" (1970)	"Back Where It's At" (1970)	"Anyway" (1971)

"Back Where It's At" is a single by American country music artist George Hamilton IV. Released in August 1970, it was the third single from his album Back Where It's At. The song peaked at number 16 on the Billboard Hot Country Singles chart. It also reached number 1 on the RPM Country Tracks chart in Canada.

== Chart performance ==
Chart (1970)	Peak position
US Billboard Hot Country Singles	16
Canadian RPM Country Tracks	1
