= Jack Blanchard & Misty Morgan =

Country music duo and married couple

- Jack Blanchard and Misty Morgan in 2010 at their induction into The Buffalo Music Hall of Fame.

Background information
- Origin: Florida, U.S.
- Genres: Country
- Years active: 1967–2021
- Labels: Wayside, Mercury, Mega, Chalice, Playback, Epic, United Artists, Columbia, Omni
- Past members: Jack Blanchard; Misty Morgan

Jack Blanchard & Misty Morgan were an American country music duo from Florida consisting of guitarist/keyboardist/vocalist Jack Blanchard (born May 8, 1942) and his wife, keyboardist/vocalist Misty Morgan (May 23, 1945 – January 1, 2021). The duo recorded for several labels in the 1970s, including the charting albums Birds of a Feather and Two Sides of Jack and Misty. Between 1969 and 1976, the duo also released fourteen singles, including "Tennessee Bird Walk", a number-one country hit and No. 23 pop hit in 1970.

== Biography ==
Jack Blanchard was born on May 8, 1942, and Misty Morgan was born on May 23, 1945. Both were born in the same hospital in Buffalo, New York and lived in Ohio as children. They met in 1963 in Florida, where Blanchard was working as a comedian and Morgan as a pianist. They married in 1967. She was diagnosed with cancer in late December 2020 and died at age 75 on January 1, 2021.

== Musical career ==
The two were already collaborating on 45s released by Miami's Zodiac label in 1965. In 1967, the now-married duo began playing music together, and, in 1969, signed to Wayside Records to release its first single, "Big Black Bird (Spirit of Our Love)", which peaked at No. 59 on the U.S. country singles charts. After it came the novelty song "Tennessee Bird Walk", which went to Number One on the country charts and No. 23 on the pop charts. The duo followed-up with another novelty hit, "Humphrey the Camel", at No. 5 country and No. 78 pop.

The duo's second album, Two Sides of Jack and Misty, was released on Mega Records two years later. It produced four more chart singles, including the No. 15 "Somewhere in Virginia in the Rain" and another novelty song, "The Legendary Chicken Fairy". Later in the 1970s, Jack Blanchard & Misty Morgan released six singles on Epic Records, reaching Top 40 for the last time in 1974 with the No. 23 "Just One More Song". Except for a compilation album called Sweet Memories in 1987, the duo did not release any other material until 1995's Back in Harmony. From there, they began recording on a self-established independent label, "Velvet Saw Records" (named after Jack's nickname). From 2005 through 2008 they released three archival CD albums on Australia's Omni Records label.

Their song 'Yellow Bellied Sapsucker' was used in an episode of the third series of Australian television drama Tangle.

== Discography ==
- Birds of a Feather (Wayside Records, 1970) US No. 185, US Country No. 16
- Two Sides of Jack and Misty (Mega Records, 1972) US Country No. 35
- Sweet Memories (Chalice Records, 1987)
- Back in Harmony (Playback Records, 1995)
- Back from the Dead (BAM Records, 2000)
- A Little Out of Sync (Velvet Saw Records, 2001)
- Masters of the Keyboards (Velvet Saw, 2001)
- Jack and Misty are Crazy (Velvet Saw, 2003)
- Beginnings (Velvet Saw, 2004)
- Back From the Dead, Vol. 2 (Velvet Saw)
- Life and Death (and Almost Everything Else) (Omni Records, 2006)
- Weird Scenes Inside the Birdhouse (Omni Records, 2007)
- Nashville Sputnik the Deep South/Outer Space Productions of Jack Blanchard & Misty Morgan (Omni Records, 2008)
- Traveling Music (Velvet Saw Records, 2009)
- Just One More Song – The 2012 Recordings (Velvet Saw Records, 2012)

== Singles ==
Year	Single	Chart positions					Album
Year	Single	US Country	US	AUS	CAN Country	CAN	Album
1969	"Bethlehem Steel"	—	—	—	—	—	Birds of a Feather
1969	"Big Black Bird (Spirit of Our Love)"	59	—	—	—	—	Birds of a Feather
1970	"Tennessee Bird Walk"	1	23	3	1	12	Birds of a Feather
1970	"Humphrey the Camel"	5	78	39	24	78	Birds of a Feather
1970	"You've Got Your Troubles (I've Got Mine)"	27	—	—	11	—	Birds of a Feather
1971	"There Must Be More to Life (Than Growing Old)"	25	—	—	—	—	Two Sides of Jack and Misty
1971	"Fire Hydrant No. 79"^{A}	46	—	—	—	—	Two Sides of Jack and Misty
1972	"Somewhere in Virginia in the Rain"	15	—	—	31	—	Two Sides of Jack and Misty
1972	"The Legendary Chicken Fairy"	38	—	—	37	—	Two Sides of Jack and Misty
1972	"Second Tuesday in December"	60	—	—	—	—	Non-album singles
1973	"A Handful of Dimes"	65	—	—	—	—	Non-album singles
1973	"The Cockroach Stomp"	—	—	—	—	—	Non-album singles
1974	"Just One More Song"	23	—	—	46	—	Non-album singles
1974	"Something on Your Mind"	53	—	—	—	—	Non-album singles
1974	"Down to the End of the Wine"	41	—	—	26	—	Non-album singles
1975	"Because We Love"	74	—	—	—	—	Non-album singles
1976	"I'm High on You"	68	—	—	—	—	Non-album singles

- ^{A}B-side to "There Must Be More to Life (Than Growing Old)".
