= Thank God and Greyhound =

Single by Roy Clark

from the album I Never Picked Cotton
- B-side: "Strangers"
- Released: September 1970
- Recorded: 1969
- Genre: Country
- Length: 2:37
- Label: Dot Records
- Songwriters: Larry Kingston and John Edward Nix

Roy Clark singles chronology
"I Never Picked Cotton" (1970)	"Thank God and Greyhound" (1970)	"Magnificent Sanctuary Band" (1971)

"Thank God and Greyhound" is a song made famous by American country musician Roy Clark. Written by Larry Kingston and John Edward Nix, the song was released in 1970 as the second single to the album I Never Picked Cotton. The song was a top 10 hit on the Billboard Hot Country Singles chart that November and reached the lower ends of the Billboard Hot 100, peaking at #90.

== Content ==
"Thank God and Greyhound" is a "twin-tempoed" song in 3/4 time measure. The lyrics are sung in first-person narrative from the point of view of a man lamenting about a woman, with whom he is involved in what has become a toxic relationship.

The tempo in the first half of the song is slow and melancholy (augmented with piano in the style of Floyd Cramer), with the man telling how his woman, the dominant one in their relationship, squandered his small fortune and demoralized him to the point of humiliation. Regardless, he loved her enough to endure her belligerence and quietly hoped that she would change, but then one day, without warning or explanation, the woman bluntly tells him that she is leaving him.

As the man watches her board a Greyhound bus he sings, "...and all I can think of... is...", at which point the accompaniment briefly stops and then, abruptly and ironically, changes to a bright and fast waltz with the now-jubilant man completing the verse with "...thank God and Greyhound you're gone!", expressing his joy and outright relief that the woman is finally out of his life. Lyrical imagery of the bus pulling out of the station is used to underscore the man's delight over the now-ended relationship, summing up his feelings with the words, "It may sound kinda cruel, but I've been silent too long; thank God and Greyhound you're gone!"

== Chart performance ==
Chart (1970)	Peak position
U.S. Billboard Hot Country Singles	6
U.S. Billboard Hot 100	90
Canadian RPM Country Tracks	2
