= I Never Once Stopped Loving You (song) =

Single by Connie Smith

from the album I Never Once Stopped Loving You
- B-side: "The Son Shines Down on Me"
- Released: March 1970
- Genre: Country
- Length: 2:51
- Label: RCA Records
- Songwriters: Bill Anderson, Jan Howard
- Producer: Bob Ferguson

Connie Smith singles chronology
"If God Is Dead (Then Who's This Living in My Soul)" (1970)	"I Never Once Stopped Loving You" (1970)	"Louisiana Man" (1970)

"I Never Once Stopped Loving You" is a single by American country music artist Connie Smith. Released in March 1970, the song reached #5 on the Billboard Hot Country Singles chart. An album of the same name was released in September 1970 that included the song. In addition, "I Never Once Stopped Loving You" also peaked at #17 on the Canadian RPM Country Tracks chart. Tammy Wynette recorded the song for her eighth studio album The First Lady released in 1970. Conway Twitty included the song on his 1970 album, Hello Darlin'. Dottie West recorded the song on her album Forever Yours in 1970.

== Chart performance ==
Chart (1970)	Peak position
U.S. Billboard Hot Country Singles	5
CAN RPM Country Tracks	17
