= You and Your Sweet Love =

Single by Connie Smith

from the album The Best of Connie Smith, Vol. 2
- B-side: "I Can't Get Used to Being Lonely"
- Released: October 1969
- Genre: Country
- Label: RCA Records
- Songwriter: Bill Anderson
- Producer: Bob Ferguson

Connie Smith singles chronology
"Young Love" (1969)	"You and Your Sweet Love" (1969)	"If God Is Dead (Then Who's This Living in My Soul)" (1970)

"You and Your Sweet Love" is a song written by Bill Anderson and recorded by American country music artist Connie Smith. Released in October 1969, the song reached number 6 on the Billboard Hot Country Singles chart. The single was later released on Smith's 1970 compilation album The Best of Connie Smith, Vol. 2. The song was additionally issued on Smith's studio album I Never Once Stopped Loving You that same year.

Conway Twitty covered "You and Your Sweet Love" on his 1970 album Hello Darlin'.

== Chart performance ==
Chart (1969)	Peak position
U.S. Billboard Hot Country Singles	6
