= He Loves Me All the Way =

Single by Tammy Wynette

from the album Tammy's Touch
- B-side: "Our Last Night Together"
- Released: April 1970
- Studio: Columbia Studio B (Nashville, Tennessee)
- Genre: Country
- Length: 2:37
- Label: Epic
- Songwriters: Billy Sherrill; Norro Wilson; Carmol Taylor
- Producer: Billy Sherrill

Tammy Wynette singles chronology
"I'll See Him Through" (1969)	"He Loves Me All the Way" (1970)	"Run, Woman, Run" (1970)

"He Loves Me All the Way" is a song written by Billy Sherrill, Norro Wilson and Carmol Taylor, and recorded by American country music artist Tammy Wynette. It was released in April 1970 as the second single from the album Tammy's Touch. The song was Wynette's seventh number one solo hit on the country charts. The single went to number one for three weeks and spent a total of fourteen weeks on the country chart.

== Charts ==
=== Weekly charts ===
Chart (1970)	Peak position
US Hot Country Songs (Billboard)	1
U.S. Billboard Hot 100	97
Canadian RPM Country Tracks	2

=== Year-end charts ===
Chart (1970)	Position
US Hot Country Songs (Billboard)	10
