= Wonder Could I Live There Anymore =

Single by Charley Pride

from the album From Me to You
- B-side: "Piroque Joe"
- Released: May 1970
- Genre: Country
- Length: 2:34
- Label: RCA Victor
- Songwriter(s): Bill Rice
- Producer(s): Jack Clement

Charley Pride singles chronology
"Is Anybody Goin' to San Antone" (1970)	"Wonder Could I Live There Anymore" (1970)	"I Can't Believe That You've Stopped Loving Me" (1970)

"Wonder Could I Live There Anymore" is a song written by Bill Rice, and recorded by American country music artist Charley Pride. It was released in May 1970 as the first single from the album From Me to You. The song was Pride's fourth number one in a row on the country charts. The single went to number one for two weeks and spent a total of 15 weeks on the top 40.

== Chart performance ==
Chart (1970)	Peak position
Australia (Kent Music Report)	88
Canadian RPM Country Tracks	1
US Hot Country Songs (Billboard)	1
US Billboard Hot 100	87
