= Six White Horses =

Single by Tommy Cash

from the album Six White Horses
- B-side: "I Owe the World to You"
- Released: October 1969
- Recorded: 1969
- Genre: Country
- Label: Epic
- Songwriter: Larry Murray
- Producer: Glenn Sutton

Tommy Cash singles chronology
"Your Lovin' Takes the Leavin' Out of Me" (1969)	"Six White Horses" (1969)	"Rise and Shine" (1970)

"Six White Horses" is a song written by Larry Murray and recorded by Tommy Cash in 1969. Cash's recording reached number four on the Billboard country chart and number 79 on the Billboard Hot 100. It made it to number one on RPM Magazine's Canadian country chart.

== Chart performance ==
Chart (1969–1970)	Peak position
U.S. Billboard Hot 100	79
U.S. Billboard Hot Country Singles	4
Australian (Kent Music Report)	84
Canadian RPM Top Singles	72
Canadian RPM Country Tracks	1

== Other songs titled "Six White Horses" ==
Other songs with the same title include:

- a 1940 release by Bill Monroe and His Bluegrass Boys, with Clyde Moody (who wrote the song), Tommy Magness, and Cousin Wilbur,
- a composition by Bobby Bond, first released in 1968 by Henson Cargill, and most notably done by Waylon Jennings in 1971 on The Taker/Tulsa.
