= Tommy Cash (country singer) =

American country musician (1940–2024)

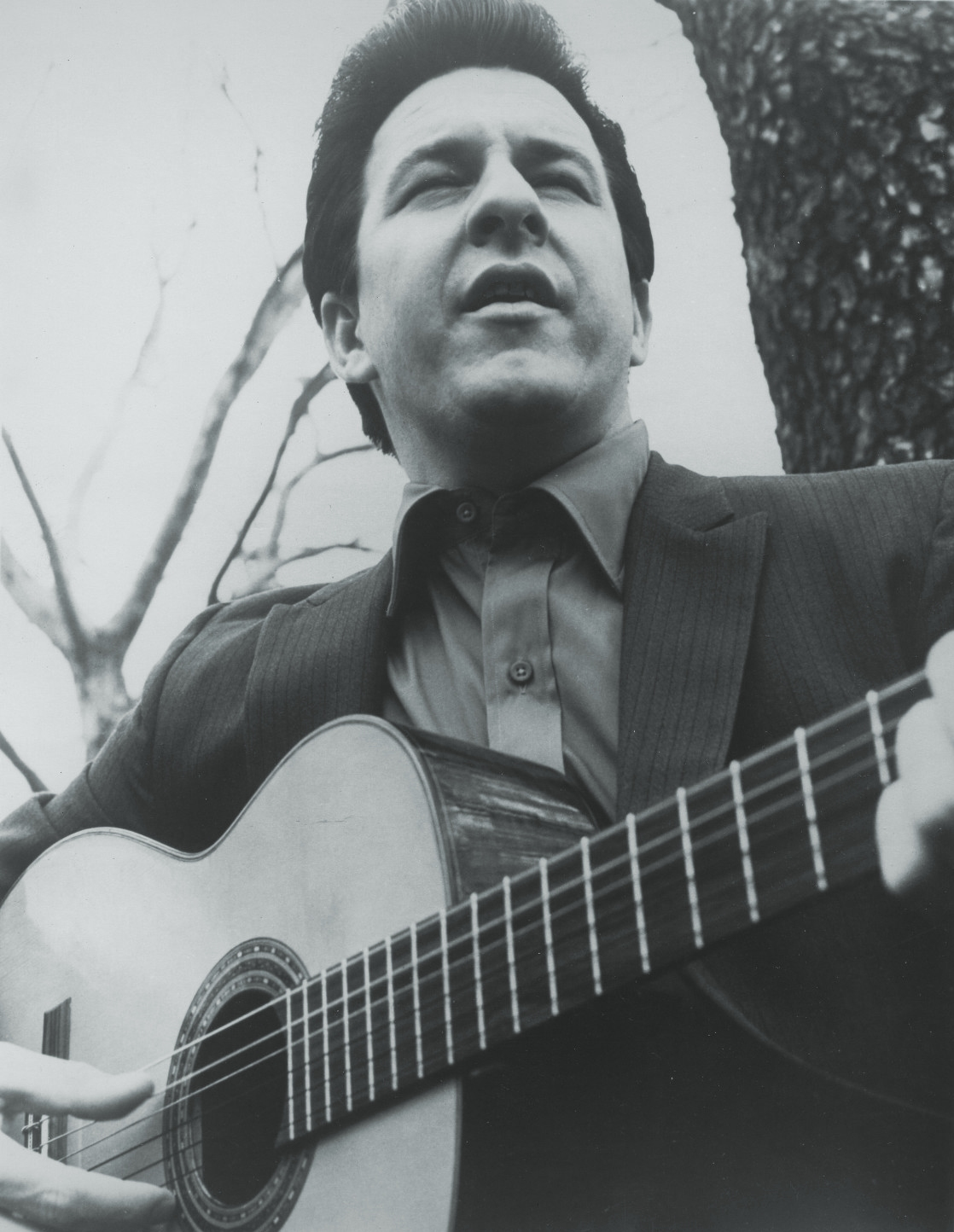
- Cash in 1969

Background information
- Born: April 5, 1940; Dyess, Arkansas, U.S.
- Died: September 13, 2024 (aged 84)
- Genres: Country; folk
- Occupations: Musician; singer; songwriter
- Instruments: Vocals; guitar
- Years active: 1965–2016
- Labels: Epic Records; House of Cash
- Website: tommycash.com

Tommy Cash (April 5, 1940 – September 13, 2024) was an American country musician. His elder brother was Johnny Cash.

== Background and career ==
Cash was born in Dyess, Arkansas, on April 5, 1940, the youngest of four sons and three daughters of Ray and Carrie (née Rivers) Cash. He formed his first band in high school. After high-school graduation, he enlisted in the United States Army, and worked as a disc jockey for the Armed Forces Radio network.

After leaving the Army, Cash played with Hank Williams Jr., and eventually gained a record deal from Musicor Records in 1965. A year later, he joined United Artists Records and released "The Sounds of Goodbye", which peaked at number 41 on the Billboard country chart.

In late 1969, while on Epic Records, he released "Six White Horses", which peaked at number 4 on the Billboard country chart. In 1970, he had a pair of top-10 singles, "One Song Away" and "Rise and Shine", written by Carl Perkins. Cash's final top-20 song, "I Recall a Gypsy Woman", was released in 1973.

Cash also acted in the 2016 film The River Thief. He continued to tour until at least late 2016.

Cash died on September 13, 2024, at the age of 84.

== Other interests ==
Cash was a licensed realtor in Tennessee, and an agent with Crye-Leike Real Estate Services in Nashville. He was a listing agent for the sale of his older brother Johnny Cash and June Carter Cash's home in Hendersonville, Tennessee, after they both died in 2003.

== Discography ==
=== Albums ===
Year	Album	Chart Positions	Label
Year	Album	US Country	Label
1968	Here's Tommy Cash	—	United Artists
1969	Your Lovin' Takes the Leavin' Out of Me	44	Epic
1970	Six White Horses	18	Epic
1970	Rise and Shine	37	Epic
1971	Cash Country	20	Epic
1971	The American Way of Life	—	Epic
1972	The Best of Tommy Cash Volume 1	43	Epic
1975	Only a Stone	—	Elektra
1978	The New Spirit	—	Monument
1982	Cashin' In	—	Brylen
1982	All Around Cowboy	—	51-West
1983	Tommy Cash	—	Ame Dane
1990	25th Anniversary Album	—	Playback
1993	Let an Old Racehorse Run	—	Playback
1996	Solid Gold Country	—	Crazy Country
1999	The Very Best of Tommy Cash	—	Collectables/ Sony Music Special Products
1999	Classics	—	Tomcat
2004	Special Edition	—	Tomcat
2004	Tribute to My Brother	—	Tomcat
2004	Rise and Shine	—	Tomcat
2008	Rise And Shine / Six White Horses	—	Omni Recording Group/ Sony Music Australia
2008	Shades of Black	—	InLight Records
2008	Fade to Black: Memories of Johnny	—	InLight Records

=== Singles ===
Year	Single	Chart Positions		Album
Year	Single	US Country	CAN Country	Album
1965	"I Guess I'll Live"	—	—	singles only
1965	"I Didn't Walk the Line"	—	—	singles only
1966	"Along the Way"	—	—	singles only
1966	"All I've Got to Show"	—	—	Here Comes Tommy Cash
1967	"Jailbirds Can't Fly"	—	—	Here Comes Tommy Cash
1967	"Tobacco Road"	—	—	Here Comes Tommy Cash
1967	"I'm Not the Boy I Used to Be"	—	—	Here Comes Tommy Cash
1968	"The Sounds of Goodbye"	41	17	single only
1969	"Your Lovin' Takes the Leavin' Out of Me"	43	—	Your Lovin' Takes the Leavin' Out of Me
1969	"Six White Horses"^{A}	4	1	Six White Horses
1970	"Rise and Shine"	9	8	Rise and Shine
1970	"One Song Away"	9	—	Rise and Shine
1970	"The Tears on Lincoln's Face"	36	—	Rise and Shine
1971	"So This Is Love"	20	28	Cash Country
1971	"I'm Gonna Write a Song"	28	—	Cash Country
1971	"Roll Truck Roll"	67	—	The American Way of Life
1972	"You're Everything"	32	—	The Best of Tommy Cash Volume 1
1972	"That Certain One"	22	34	The Best of Tommy Cash Volume 1
1972	"Listen"	24	48	The Best of Tommy Cash Volume 1
1973	"Workin' on a Feelin'"	37	30	singles only
1973	"I Recall a Gypsy Woman"	16	—	singles only
1973	"She Met a Stranger, I Met a Train"	21	42	singles only
1974	"Will the Circle Be Unbroken"	—	—	singles only
1974	"Roller Coaster Ride"	—	—	singles only
1975	"The One I Sing My Love Songs To"	58	—	Only a Stone
1975	"Only a Stone"	—	—	Only a Stone
1976	"Broken Bones"	94	—	singles only
1976	"She Is Beautiful"	—	—	singles only
1976	"She Still Has That Look in Her Eyes"	—	—	singles only
1976	"King for a Day"	—	—	singles only
1977	"The Cowboy and the Lady"	63	—	The New Spirit
1977	"Reach Out"	—	—	single only
1978	"Take My Love to Rita"	98	—	The New Spirit
1978	"In Crowd"	—	—	The New Spirit
1979	"I'd Be Better Off Alone"	—	—	singles only
1979	"When the Lovin' Starts"	—	—	singles only
1982	"(I Used to Want to Be a) Cowboy"	—	—	singles only
1983	"My Mother's Other Son" (w/ Tommy Jennings)	—	—	singles only
1987	"Radio Lover"	—	—	single only
1990	"Hank and George, Lefty and Me" (w/ George Jones)	—	—	25th Anniversary Album
1990	"Guess Things Happen That Way" (w/ Johnny Cash)	—	—	25th Anniversary Album
1996	"Man of Experience"	—	—	single only
2009	"Ramblin' Kind"	—	—	Fade to Black

- ^{A}"Six White Horses" peaked at No. 79 on the Billboard Hot 100 and No. 72 on the RPM Top Singles chart in Canada.
