= I Can't Believe That You've Stopped Loving Me =

Single by Charley Pride

from the album From Me to You
- B-side: "Time (You're Not a Friend of Mine)"
- Released: September 1970
- Genre: Country
- Length: 3:06
- Label: RCA Victor
- Songwriter(s): Dallas Frazier; A.L. "Doodle" Owens
- Producer(s): Jack Clement

Charley Pride singles chronology
"Wonder Could I Live There Anymore" (1970)	"I Can't Believe That You've Stopped Loving Me" (1970)	"I'd Rather Love You" (1971)

"I Can't Believe That You've Stopped Loving Me" is a song written by Dallas Frazier and A.L. "Doodle" Owens, and recorded by American country music artist Charley Pride. It was released in September 1970 as the second single from the album From Me to You. The song was Pride's fifth number one on the country charts. The single stayed at number one for two weeks and spent a total of fifteen weeks on the country charts.

Some interesting details

== Contribution in Music Career ==
This song was one of several No. 1 hits by Charley Pride that contributed significantly to his esteemed position in the Country Music genre.

== Grammy Nomination ==
While the song didn't win, "I Can't Believe That You've Stopped Loving Me" was nominated for a Grammy in 1971 under the Best Country Vocal Performance, Male category.

== Sequenced Track ==
In the original album release, "I Can't Believe That You've Stopped Loving Me" is the second track on "Just Plain Charley."

== Album Success ==
The album "Just Plain Charley," where this song is featured, was a commercial success, going gold in Canada and making it to the Top 10 of the country albums chart.

== Legacy ==
Despite being released more than fifty years ago, "I Can't Believe That You've Stopped Loving Me" remains one of Charley Pride's most popular and well-loved songs.

== Covers ==
While the original is by Charley Pride, several artists have since covered "I Can't Believe That You've Stopped Loving Me," including Porter Wagoner and Dolly Parton on their album "Porter Wayne and Dolly Rebecca.”

== Chart performance ==
Chart (1970)	Peak position
US Hot Country Songs (Billboard)	1
US Billboard Hot 100	71
Canadian RPM Country Tracks	1
