= Jan Howard discography =

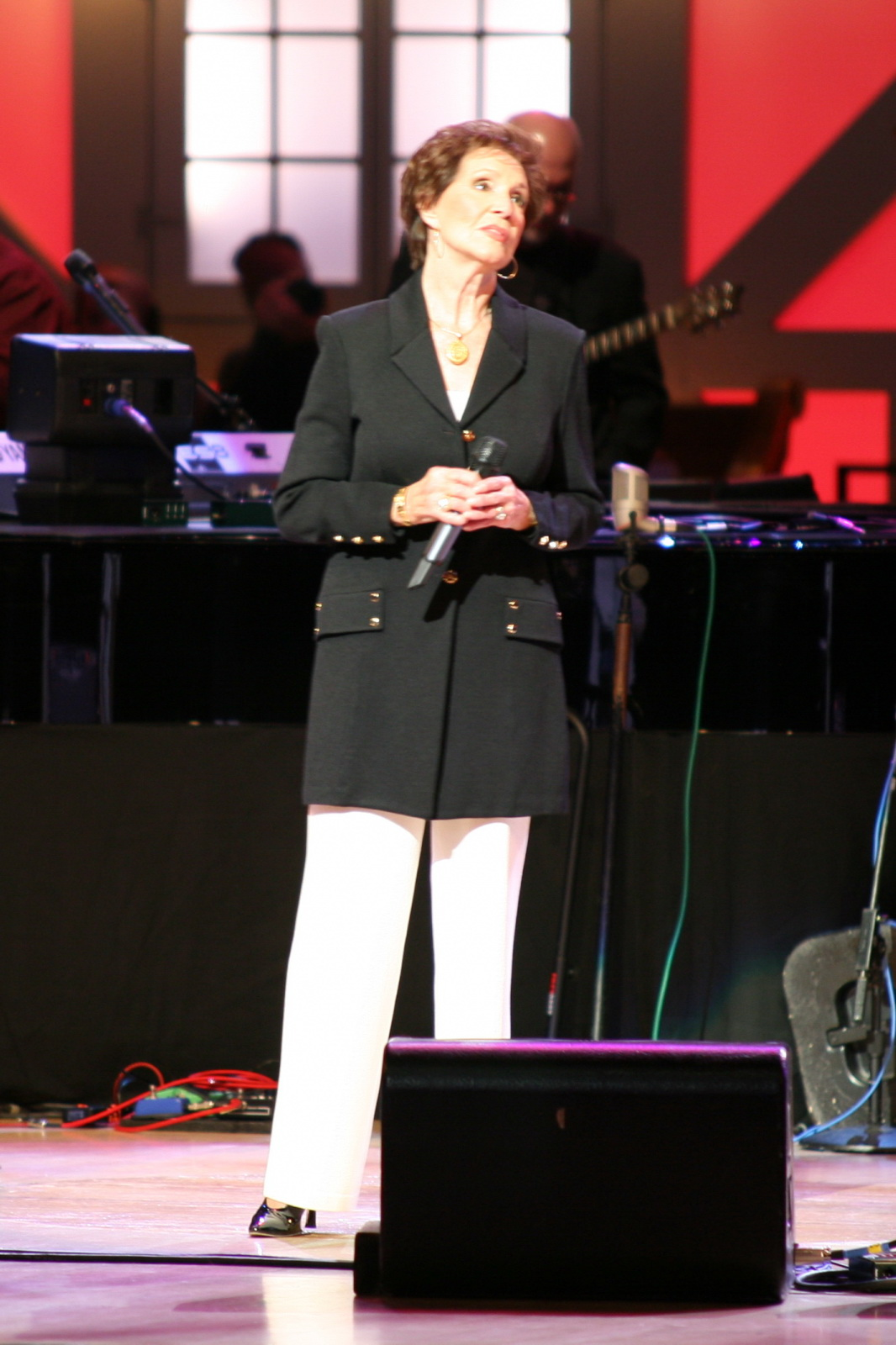
- Jan Howard live at the Grand Ole Opry, 2007.
- Studio albums: 17
- Compilation albums: 6
- Singles: 51
- Box sets: 1
- Collaborative studio albums: 5
- Collaborative singles: 7
- Other charted songs: 2
- Other album appearances: 12

The discography of American country artist Jan Howard contains 17 studio albums (five of which were collaborative releases), six compilation albums, 51 singles (seven of which were collaborative singles), one box set, two other charted songs and 12 additional album appearances. Her recordings were issued as singles beginning in 1958. The first to chart was issued by Challenge Records called "The One You Slip Around With". Released in 1959, it rose into the US Hot Country Songs top 20. It was followed by two duets with Wynn Stewart, including the chart record "Wrong Company". Howard's debut studio album, Sweet and Sentimental, featured dual credit with The Jordanaires and was issued by Capitol Records in 1962. In 1963, "I Wish I Was a Single Girl Again" reached the top 30 of the US country songs chart.

The 1964 single, "What Makes a Man Wander?", reached number 25 on the US country chart. It was recorded on Decca Records where most of Howard's material was released on. Her 1966 recording of "Evil on Your Mind" reached the US country songs top five, becoming one of two top ten solo singles in her career. The follow-up, "Bad Seed", was her second solo top ten entry. Both songs appeared on corresponding 1966 studio albums that entered the US Top Country Albums chart: Jan Howard Sings Evil on Your Mind and Bad Seed. Eight more of Howard's solo singles made the top 40 on the US country chart. This included the top 20 singles "Count Your Blessings, Woman" (1968), "My Son" (1968) and "We Had All the Good Things Going" (1969). They appeared on studio albums that made the US country chart as well such as Jan Howard (1969) and Rock Me Back to Little Rock (1970).

Beginning in 1965, Howard formed a duet partnership with Bill Anderson. Their 1967 single became her only chart-topping recording: "For Loving You". Between 1968 and 1972, the duo recorded four studio albums beginning with 1968's For Loving You. The album rose to number six on the US country chart. Their 1972 album Bill and Jan (Or Jan and Bill)) also made the US country top ten. The Anderson-Howard duo also had three more US and Canadian RPM top ten country songs: "If It's All the Same to You" (1969), "Someday We'll Be Together" (1970) and "Dis-Satisfied" (1971). Howard continued recording with Decca through 1974 before releasing Sincerely, Jan Howard (1975) on the GRT label. Her final charting singles were issued in the late 1970s and she released three more studio albums through the 1980s.

== Albums ==
=== Solo studio albums ===
List of studio albums, with selected chart positions, and other relevant details
Title	Album details	Peak chart positions
Title	Album details	US Country
Jan Howard Sings Evil on Your Mind	Released: July 1966; Label: Decca; Formats: LP	10
Bad Seed	Released: November 1966; Label: Decca; Formats: LP	13
This Is Jan Howard Country	Released: October 1967; Label: Decca; Formats: LP	9
Count Your Blessings, Woman	Released: June 1968; Label: Decca; Formats: LP	27
Jan Howard	Released: June 1969; Label: Decca; Formats: LP	25
For God and Country	Released: January 1970; Label: Decca; Formats: LP	—
Rock Me Back to Little Rock	Released: June 1970; Label: Decca; Formats: LP	42
Love Is Like a Spinning Wheel	Released: March 1972; Label: Decca; Formats: LP	40
Sincerely, Jan Howard	Released: 1975; Label: GRT; Formats: LP	—
Stars of the Grand Ole Opry	Released: April 1981; Label: First Generation; Formats: LP, cassette	—
Tainted Love	Released: 1983; Label: AVI; Formats: LP	—
Jan Howard	Released: 1985; Label: Dot/MCA; Formats: LP, cassette	—
"—" denotes a recording that did not chart or was not released in that territory.

=== Collaborative studio albums ===
List of studio albums, with selected chart positions, and other relevant details
Title	Album details	Peak chart positions
Title	Album details	US Country
Sweet and Sentimental (with The Jordanaires)	Released: October 1962; Label: Capitol; Formats: LP	—
For Loving You (with Bill Anderson)	Released: February 1968; Label: Decca; Formats: LP	6
If It's All the Same to You (with Bill Anderson)	Released: March 1970; Label: Decca; Formats: LP	25
Bill and Jan (Or Jan and Bill) (with Bill Anderson)	Released: January 1972; Label: Decca; Formats: LP	9
Singing His Praise (with Bill Anderson)	Released: March 1972; Label: Decca; Formats: LP	—
"—" denotes a recording that did not chart or was not released in that territory.

=== Compilation albums ===
List of compilations albums, showing all relevant details
Title	Album details
Sweethearts of Country Music (with Wynn Stewart)	Released: 1960; Label: Challenge; Formats: LP
Jan Howard	Released: 1962; Label: Wrangler; Formats: LP
The Real Me	Released: April 1968; Label: Tower; Formats: LP
Bad Seed	Released: 1973; Label: Coral; Formats: LP
Rock Me Back to Little Rock	Released: 1976; Label: Hilltop/Pickwick; Formats: LP
The Very Best of Wynn Stewart & Jan Howard (with Wynn Stewart)	Released: August 10, 2004; Label: Varèse Sarabande; Formats: CD

=== Box sets ===
List of box sets, showing all relevant details
Title	Album details
Through the Years with Jan Howard	Released: 2005; Label: self-released; Formats: CD

== Singles ==
=== As lead artist ===
List of singles, with selected chart positions, and other relevant details
Title	Year	Peak chart positions		Album
Title	Year	US Cou.	CAN Cou.	Album
"Pick Me Up on Your Way Down"	1958	—	—	—N/a
"Weeping Willow (Weep for Me)"	1959	—	—	—N/a
"The One You Slip Around With"	1959	13	—	—N/a
"If Your Conscience Can't Stop You (How Can I)"	1960	—	—	—N/a
"I've Got My Pride"	1960	—	—	—N/a
"All Alone Again"	1961	—	—	—N/a
"Careless Hands"	1961	—	—	—N/a
"Bring It on Back to Me"	1961	—	—	—N/a
"Tomorrow You Won't Even Know My Name"	1962	—	—	—N/a
"Whatcha Gonna Do for an Encore"	1962	—	—	—N/a
"Looking Back"	1962	—	—	Sweet and Sentimental
"Wind Me Up"	1963	—	—	—N/a
"I Can't Stop Crying"	1963	—	—	—N/a
"I Wish I Was a Single Girl Again"	1963	27	—	—N/a
"I Walked a Hundred Miles"	1964	—	—	—N/a
"What Makes a Man Wander?"	1964	25	—	Jan Howard Sings Evil on Your Mind
"I've Got Feelings Too"	1965	—	—	Jan Howard Sings Evil on Your Mind
"You Don't Find a Good Man Everyday"	1965	—	—	Jan Howard Sings Evil on Your Mind
"Evil on Your Mind"	1966	5	—	Jan Howard Sings Evil on Your Mind
"Bad Seed"	1966	10	—	Bad Seed
"Any Old Way You Do"	1967	32	—	This Is Jan Howard Country
"Roll Over and Play Dead"	1967	26	—	This Is Jan Howard Country
"Count Your Blessings, Woman"	1968	16	6	Count Your Blessings, Woman
"I Still Believe in Love"	1968	27	8	Jan Howard
"My Son"	1968	15	28	Jan Howard
"When We Tried"	1969	24	—	Jan Howard
"We Had All the Good Things Going"	1969	20	—	Rock Me Back to Little Rock
"Rock Me Back to Little Rock"	1970	26	—	Rock Me Back to Little Rock
"The Soul You Never Had"	1970	64	—	—N/a
"Baby, Without You"	1971	56	—	—N/a
"Dallas, You've Won"	1971	—	—	—N/a
"Love Is Like a Spinning Wheel"	1971	36	14	Love Is Like a Spinning Wheel
"Let Him Have It"	1972	43	—	Love Is Like a Spinning Wheel
"New York City Song"	1972	—	—	—N/a
"Too Many Ties That Bind"	1973	74	—	—N/a
"Seein' Is Believin'"	1974	96	—	Sincerely, Jan Howard
"I'm Alright 'Til I See You"	1975	—	—	Sincerely, Jan Howard
"You'll Never Know"	1975	—	—	Sincerely, Jan Howard
"I'll Hold You in My Heart (Till I Can Hold You in My Arms)"	1977	70	—	—N/a
"Better Off Alone"	1977	65	—	—N/a
"To Love a Rolling Stone"	1978	93	—	—N/a
"Living and Loving Hondo"	1981	—	—	Stars of the Grand Ole Opry
"Tainted Love"	1983	—	—	Tainted Love
"Silver Tongue and Gold Plated Lies"	1984	—	—	Tainted Love
"—" denotes a recording that did not chart or was not released in that territory.

=== As a collaborative artist ===
List of singles, with selected chart positions, showing other relevant details
Title	Year	Peak chart positions		Album
Title	Year	US Cou.	CAN Cou.	Album
"Yankee Go Home" (with Wynn Stewart)	1959	—	—	—N/a
"Wrong Company" (with Wynn Stewart)	1960	26	—	—N/a
"I Know You're Married (But I Love You Still)" (with Bill Anderson)	1965	29	—	If It's All the Same to You
"For Loving You" (with Bill Anderson)	1967	1	9	For Loving You
"If It's All the Same to You" (with Bill Anderson)	1969	2	8	If It's All the Same to You
"Someday We'll Be Together" (with Bill Anderson)	1970	4	3	Bill and Jan (Or Jan and Bill)
"Dis-Satisfied" (with Bill Anderson)	1971	4	11	Bill and Jan (Or Jan and Bill)
"—" denotes a recording that did not chart or was not released in that territory.

== Other charted songs ==
List of songs, showing selected chart positions and other relevant details
Title	Year	Peak chart positions	Album	Notes
Title	Year	US Country	Album	Notes
"Time Out" (with Bill Anderson)	1965	44	If It's All the Same to You	(Note: Released as the B-side to the single "I Know You're Married (But I Love You Still)")
"Marriage Has Ruined More Good Love Affairs"	1971	57	—N/a	(Note: Released as the B-side to the single "Baby, Without You". It was issued as a double A-side single, originally titled "Baby Without You"/"Marriage Has Ruined More Good Love Affairs".)

== Other album appearances ==
List of non-single guest appearances, with other performing artists, showing year released and album name
Title	Year	Other artist(s)	Album	Ref.
"Daddy Sang Bass" (un-credited)	1969	Johnny Cash	The Holy Land	
"(Ghost) Riders in the Sky"	1979	Johnny Cash, Anita Carter, Helen Carter, June Carter Cash	Silver	
"I'm Gonna Try to Be That Way"	1979	Johnny Cash	A Believer Sings the Truth	
"Just as I Am"	1988	—N/a	More Gospel Country	
"God Rest Ye Merry Gentlemen"	1988	—N/a	K-Tel Presents Christmas Favorites	
"Anna"	2001	Hank Locklin	Generations in Song	
"Those Were the Days" (credited as "The Opry Gang")	2005	Dolly Parton	Those Were the Days	
"He's Got the Whole World in His Hands"	2007	Bill Anderson, Vince Gill	Whisperin' Bluegrass	
"Where No One Stands Alone"	2010	George Hamilton IV	Old Fashioned Hymns and Gospel Songs... for Those Who Miss Them!	
"Every Hour, Every Day"	2010	Johnny Cash	Longing for Old Virginia	
"We're Still Hangin' In There Ain't We Jessi"	2017	Jessi Colter, Jeannie Seely	Written in Song	
"You Can't Rollerskate in a Buffalo Herd"	2018	Bill Anderson, John Anderson, Bellamy Brothers, Roy Clark, Larry Gatlin, Bobby Goldsboro, Brenda Lee, Roger Miller, Tanya Tucker	King of the Road: A Tribute to Roger Miller	
