= Love Is Like a Spinning Wheel (album) =

Studio album by Jan Howard
- Released: March 1972
- Genre: Country
- Label: Decca Records

Jan Howard chronology
Bill and Jan (Or Jan and Bill) (1972)	Love Is Like a Spinning Wheel (1972)	Singing His Praise (1972)

Singles from Love Is Like a Spinning Wheel
- 1. "Love Is Like a Spinning Wheel" Released: December 1971; 2. "Let Him Have It" Released: March 1972

Love Is Like a Spinning Wheel is a studio album by American country artist Jan Howard. It was released by Decca Records in March 1972 and was her twelfth studio album. The project contained 11 tracks, which were a mixture of new songs and cover tunes. Among its tracks were two singles: "Let Him Have It" and the title track. The latter was a top 40 US country song and a top 20 Canadian country song. The album itself made the top 40 of the US country albums chart. The project was given reviews from Billboard and Cash Box magazines.

== Background, recording and content ==
The former wife of country music songwriter Harlan Howard, Jan Howard was encouraged by her husband to launch her own recording career. Although her first commercially-successful song was "The One You Slip Around With" in 1960, it was not until working alongside producer Owen Bradley at Decca Records that she reached her commercial peak. Beginning in the middle 1960s, songs like "Evil on Your Mind", "Bad Seed" and "For Loving You" became top ten recordings. It would be followed by further commercial successes include the single "Love Is Like a Spinning Wheel". The song served as the title to Howard's 1972 studio album. The album was a collection of 11 tracks. Among its new recordings was "Let Him Have It" and "Remember the Good". The latter recording was later described by Howard as one of her favorite recordings and one of the mantras she lived by during her lifetime. Howard also re-recorded "The One You Slip Around With" for the project. Other tracks were cover tunes of popular recordings from the era: "Kiss an Angel Good Mornin'", "He's All I Got" and "Banks of the Ohio".

== Release and critical reception ==
Love Is Like a Spinning Wheel was released by Decca Records in March 1972 and was her twelfth studio project. The label distributed it as a vinyl LP with six songs on "side 1" and five songs on "side 2". The album was reviewed by music magazines following its release in 1972. Billboard praised Howard's vocal delivery and emotional depth on the album's recordings. "It is a joy to hear her sing and to share her warm, intuitive readings. Terrific LP, sure to garner much airplay and sales," they concluded. Cash Box took note of Howard's lack of solo albums in recent years and highlighted the album as a solo relaunch in her career. The publication specifically highlighted her cover of "Banks of the Ohio" as a "fine rendition" of the tune.

== Chart performance and singles ==
Love Is Like a Spinning Wheel made its debut on the US Billboard Top Country Albums chart on April 15, 1972. It spent four weeks on the survey and peaked at the number 40 position on April 29. It was Howard's tenth album to make the Billboard country chart and her final album to do so. Two singles were included on the project. Its earliest single was the title track, which Decca originally issued in December 1971. It climbed into the top 40 of the US country songs chart, rising to the number 36 position in 1972. In addition, it made the top 20 of Canada's RPM Country Tracks chart, rising to the number 14 position. Its second single was "Let Him Have It" and it was released in March 1972 by the Decca label. The song rose into the US country top 50, peaking at number 43 in 1972.

== Track listing ==
Side one
No.	Title	Writer(s)	Length
1.	"Love Is Like a Spinning Wheel"	Sergio Endrigo; Bill Owen	2:37
2.	"The One You Slip Around With"	Harlan Howard; Fuzzy Owen	2:27
3.	"Banks of the Ohio"	Welch and Farrar	2:50
4.	"He's All I Got"	Gary Bonds; Jerry Williams, Jr.	2:51
5.	"Missing You"	Larry Butler	2:15
6.	"Remember the Good"	Mickey Newbury	2:38

Side two
No.	Title	Writer(s)	Length
1.	"Let Him Have It"	Ben Peters	2:17
2.	"All I Ever Need Is You"	Jimmy Holiday; Eddie Reeves	2:43
3.	"Kiss an Angel Good Morning"	Ben Peters	2:07
4.	"Completely"	Dave Burgess	2:33
5.	"I'd Like to Teach the World to Sing"	Bill Backer; Billy Davis; Roger Cook; Roger Greenaway	2:02

== Personnel ==
All credits are adapted from the liner notes of Love Is Like a Spinning Wheel.

- DWJ – Mastering
- Robert Lockart – Design

== Chart performance ==
Chart (1972)	Peak position
US Top Country Albums (Billboard)	40

== Release history ==
Region	Date	Format	Label	Ref.
Australia	March 1972	Vinyl LP	MCA Records	
North America	March 1972	Vinyl LP	Decca Records	
