= L'arca di Noè (song) =

Single by Sergio Endrigo
- B-side: "Dall'America"
- Released: 1970
- Genre: Pop
- Label: Fonit Cetra
- Songwriter: Sergio Endrigo
- Producer: Sergio Bardotti

Sergio Endrigo singles chronology
"Una breve stagione" (1969)	"L'arca di Noè" (1970)	"Oriente" (1970)

Audio
- "L'arca di Noè" on YouTube

"L'arca di Noè" is a 1970 song composed by Sergio Endrigo. The song premiered at the 20th edition of the Sanremo Music Festival, with a double performance by Endrigo and Iva Zanicchi, and placed at the third place.

"L'arca di Noè" was a commercial success, ranking third on the Italian hit parade and becoming a lasting classic. It was also praised by critics, with the Corriere della Sera musical critic Vincenzo Buonassisi describing it as "the only Sanremo Festival song which tried to say something new, to touch open issues for the consciousness of the people of today".

The main tune derived from Sedi, Mara, na kamen studencu! (Sidi Mara) (Aloha ʻOe!)

A Spanish adaptation of the song, "El Arca de Noé", was recorded by Jimmy Fontana and peaked at the first place on the Argentine hit parade. An English adaptation, titled "When Love Comes Round Again" and performed by Ken Dodd, reached #19 in the UK Singles Chart.

== Track listing ==
7" single – SP 1423

1. "L'arca di Noè" (Sergio Endrigo)
2. "Dall'America" (Sergio Bardotti, Sergio Endrigo)

== Charts ==
Chart (1970)	Peak position
Argentina (CAPIF)	1
Italy (Musica e dischi)	3

== Jan Howard version ==
"Love Is Like a Spinning Wheel"

Single by Jan Howard

from the album Love Is Like a Spinning Wheel
- B-side: "I Never Once Stopped Loving You"
- Released: November 1971
- Genre: Country
- Length: 2:37
- Label: Decca
- Songwriters: Sergio Endrigo; Bill Owen

Jan Howard singles chronology
"Dis-Satisfied" (1971)	"Love Is Like a Spinning Wheel" (1971)	"Let Him Have It" (1972)

Audio
- "Love Is Like a Spinning Wheel" on YouTube

The wife of country music songwriter Harlan Howard, Jan Howard was encouraged by her husband to launch her own recording career. Her first commercial success was 1960's "The One You Slip Around With", but she reached her peak commercial success in the middle 1960s with songs like "Evil on Your Mind", "Bad Seed" and "For Loving You". Her label (Decca Records) continued releasing material through the early 1970s including "Love Is Like a Spinning Wheel". The song used the same English lyrics written by Bill Owen and also credited Sergio Endrigo. Yet, the song was re-titled as "Love Is Like a Spinning Wheel"

Howard's version was released as a single by Decca in December 1971. Cash Box found the lyrics had "a lot to say" and called the arrangement "smooth" while Record World thought it had a "very very likable melody". It rose into the top 40 on the US Billboard Hot Country Songs chart, peaking at number 36 in early 1972. It also rose into the top 20 on Canada's RPM Country Tracks chart, peaking at number 14. It was also released on Howard's 1972 studio album of the same name.

=== Track listing ===
7" vinyl single

- "Love Is Like a Spinning Wheel" – 2:37
- "I Never Once Stopped Loving You" – 2:54

=== Charts ===
Weekly chart performance for "Love Is Like a Spinning Wheel"
Chart (1971–1972)	Peak position
Canada Country Tracks (RPM)	14
US Hot Country Songs (Billboard)	36
