= Stars of the Grand Ole Opry (Jan Howard album) =

Studio album by Jan Howard
- Released: May 1981
- Studio: Pete's Place
- Genre: Country
- Label: First Generation
- Producer: Pete Drake

Jan Howard chronology
| Sincerely, Jan Howard (1975) | Stars of the Grand Ole Opry (1981) | Tainted Love (1983) |

Singles from Stars of the Grand Ole Opry
- 1. "Living and Loving Hondo" Released: 1981

Stars of the Grand Ole Opry is a studio album by American country music artist Jan Howard. It was released in May 1981 via First Generation Records and was a collection of ten tracks. Seven of the songs were new recordings, while three were re-recordings of Howard's most popular singles. The album part of a veteran-artists program crafted by the First Generation label to market music towards middle-aged audiences. It was re-released several times and was reviewed by Billboard magazine.

== Background ==
The ex-wife of country songwriter Harlan Howard, Jan Howard got her own recording contract after her husband discovered her singing skills. In the 1960s, Howard had a string of charting US country songs including the top ten releases "Evil on Your Mind", "Bad Seed" and the chart-topping "For Loving You". Howard left her career for a brief period before returning to it in the mid 1970s. Among the albums released following her return was Stars of the Grand Ole Opry. Howard was approached by First Generation records creator Pete Drake to make an album with his label and she agreed to it. The project was among several by other veteran-era country artists that were meant to cater to middle-age audiences. Other artists who released albums with the same title were Charlie Louvin and Jean Shepard.

== Recording and content ==
Stars of the Grand Ole Opry was produced entirely by Pete Drake at his Nashville, Tennessee recording studio called Pete's Place. The project was a collection of ten tracks that included both new material and re-recordings. Among the new tracks was Howard's self-composed "The Life of a Country Girl Singer" and Johnny Cash's self-composed "Cowboy's Last Ride". Other new songs included "Memories for Sale", "Let Me Be Her Tonight", "Now That He's Gone" and "Keepin' the Feelin' Alive". Re-recordings that Howard cut for the project were "Evil on Your Mind", "Bad Seed" and "The One You Slip Around With".

== Release, critical reception and singles ==
Stars of the Grand Ole Opry was released in May 1981 by First Generation Records and was the fifteenth studio album of Howard's music career. The album was originally offered as a vinyl LP with five songs on each side of the record. It was later re-issued as a compact disc in 1998 by First Generation. It was later released digitally to online platforms such as Apple Music. First Generation planned to mail 5,000 brochures to US country music retailers in its original distribution. The album series was also promoted through a television marketing campaign. It was further promoted in a television special that aired in August 1981 titled Country Music Celebration. One single was issued from the album: "Living and Loving Hondo". It was released in 1981. The album series was reviewed by Billboard magazine after its original 1981 release. The publication praised Howard's "Memories for Sale", writing that she turned the recording "into a poptorch masterpiece" and also praised "The Life of a Country Girl Singer", calling it "canonical hillbilly". AllMusic later reviewed the compact disc version and gave it four out of five stars.

== Track listing ==
Side one
| No. | Title | Writer(s) | Length |
|---|---|---|---|
| 1. | "Living and Loving Hondo" | Rick Beresford | 2:59 |
| 2. | "Cowboy's Last Ride" | J.R. Cash | 3:01 |
| 3. | "Now That He's Gone" | Rick Beresford; Harlan Sanders | 2:41 |
| 4. | "Memories for Sale" | Linda Hargrove; Pam Rose; Mary Ann Kennedy | 3:28 |
| 5. | "Let Me Be Her Tonight" | Mary Ann Kennedy; Pam Rose; Don Goodman | 3:10 |

Side two
| No. | Title | Writer(s) | Length |
|---|---|---|---|
| 1. | "The Life of a Country Girl Singer" | Jan Howard | 3:05 |
| 2. | "Evil on Your Mind" | Harlan Howard | 2:20 |
| 3. | "Bad Seed" | Bill Anderson | 2:49 |
| 4. | "The One You Slip Around With" | Harlan Howard; Fuzzy Owen | 2:12 |
| 5. | "Keepin' the Feelin' Alive" | Rick Beresford | 3:14 |

== Personnel ==
All credits are adapted from the liner notes of Stars of the Grand Ole Opry.

Musical personnel

- Randy Best – engineering
- Hayword Bishop – drums
- Jimmy Capps – guitar
- Jimmie Crawford – steel guitar
- Pete Drake – steel guitar, producer
- Johnny Drake – engineering
- Bobby Emmons – piano
- Jan Howard – lead vocals
- Bill Hullett – guitar
- The Jordanaires – background vocals
- Shane Keister – piano
- Jerry Kroon – drums
- Bob Moore – bass
- Al Pachucki – engineering
- Hargus "Pig" Robbins – piano
- Pete Wade – guitar
- Tommy Williams – fiddle

== Release history ==
| Region | Date | Format | Label | Ref. |
|---|---|---|---|---|
| United States | May 1981 | Vinyl LP | First Generation Records | |
| United States | September 28, 1999 | Compact disc | First Generation Records | |
| United States | circa 2010 | Music download | First Generation Records | |
