= For God and Country (Jan Howard album) =

Studio album by Jan Howard
- Released: January 1970
- Genre: Country; inspirational; patriotic
- Label: Decca
- Producer: Owen Bradley

Jan Howard chronology
Jan Howard (1969)	For God and Country (1970)	If It's All the Same to You (1970)

For God and Country is a studio album by American country artist Jan Howard. It was released by Decca Records in January 1970 and consisted of 11 tracks. The project was a collection of 11 tracks dedicated to Howard's son who was killed in the Vietnam War. The songs on the album were both patriotic and inspirational music. It was given a positive review by Billboard magazine.

== Background, recording and content ==
The wife of country songwriter Harlan Howard, Jan Howard was encouraged by her husband to launch her own recording career who believed in her singing ability. He helped her get a recording contract and by 1960 she made the country charts with "The One You Slip Around With". However, it was not until signing with Decca Records that she had her peak commercial success. Songs like "Evil on Your Mind", "Count Your Blessings, Woman" and "When We Tried" were charting top 40 country recordings during the 1960s. The label also issued a series of albums by Howard, among them was For God and Country.

According to Howard, she was inspired to record an album of patriotic and inspirational music after finding a poem written by her son, Carter Howard (a member of the US military). The poem told of his experiences serving in the military. She also decided to dedicate the project to her eldest son, Jimmy, who was also a US military soldier and was killed in the Vietnam War. For God and Country was a collection of 11 tracks and was produced by Owen Bradley. Howard recounted in her autobiography that it was "the most difficult album I'd ever recorded yet one that would always be the closest to my heart". She also remembered sessions musicians crying during the recording of the album.

== Release and critical reception ==
For God and Country was released by Decca Records in January 1970 and was Howard's eighth studio album in her career. It was distributed as a vinyl LP and as an 8-track cartridge with five songs on "side 1" and six songs on "side 2". For God and Country was among eight albums issued by Decca in January 1970 to promote their 8-track cartridges. Billboard magazine reviewed the project in January 1970, finding that Howard was "striking deep at the very vibes of the soul of the country music fan". They also concluded that the album "will reap big rewards".

== Track listing ==
Side one
No.	Title	Writer(s)	Length
1.	"The Twenty-Third Psalm" (background music: "The Battle Hymn of the Republic")	Julia Ward Howe	2:25
2.	"How Great Thou Art"	Stuart K. Hine	3:42
3.	"The Night Watch"	Cindy Walker	2:24
4.	"The Old Rugged Cross"	Rev. George Bennard	2:55
5.	"The Pledge of Allegiance" (background music: "Red's White and Blue March")	Red Skelton	3:26
6.	"The Lord's Prayer"	Albert Hay Malotte	2:42

Side two
No.	Title	Writer(s)	Length
1.	"I Am" (background music: "Onward Christian Soldiers")	Carter Howard; Sir Arthur Sullivan; S. Baring-Gould	3:18
2.	"Where No One Stands Alone"	Mosie Lister	3:06
3.	"God Bless America"	Irving Berlin	1:50
4.	"God Bless America Again"	Bobby Bare; Boyce Hawkins	2:30
5.	"I Believe"	Ervin Drake; Irvin Graham; Jimmy Shirl; Al Stillman	2:20

== Personnel ==
All credits are adapted from the liner notes of For God and Country.

- Bill Anderson – Liner notes
- Bobby Bare – Liner notes
- Owen Bradley – Producer

== Release history ==
Region	Date	Format	Label	Ref.
North America	January 1970	Vinyl LP (stereo); 8-Track Cartridge	Decca Records	
