= My Son (song) =

Single by Jan Howard

from the album Jan Howard
- B-side: "The Tip of My Fingers"
- Released: November 1968
- Recorded: October 4, 1968
- Genre: Country; Nashville Sound
- Length: 2:46
- Label: Decca
- Songwriter(s): Jan Howard
- Producer(s): Owen Bradley

Jan Howard singles chronology
"I Still Believe in Love" (1968)	"My Son" (1968)	"When We Tried" (1969)

"My Son" is a song written and recorded by American country music singer Jan Howard. It is among several songs recorded by country artists during this period that related to the Vietnam War. The song is based on a letter Howard wrote to her son, Jimmy, who was drafted into the war. After writing the letter, she was inspired by family and friends to put it to music. Recording the song in a single take, it was released as a single in 1968.

Howard sent the song to her son in 1968 after its release. Before he could write back, he was killed in battle. At the same time, "My Son" became a commercial success on the US country chart. The recording later appeared on Howard's 1969 self-titled studio album. Since its release, "My Son" has been considered among Howard's signature songs. In later years, the song also has been featured in documentaries that discuss the Vietnam War.

== Background ==
Jan Howard was the former wife of country music songwriter Harlan Howard. With his encouragement, she forged her own recording career beginning with the top 15 country song in 1960 called "The One You Slip Around With". She had a series of charting singles during the 1960s including the top ten "Evil on Your Mind" and the chart-topping duet with Bill Anderson called "For Loving You". In 1968, Howard's oldest son, Jimmy, was drafted and sent to fight in the Vietnam War. In her autobiography Howard said that she frequently wrote letters to her son to keep him updated on events happening at home. At some points, she was writing to him two to three times per week. In one particular letter Howard described a feeling of "no control" over what she was composing which would ultimately become "My Son".

She remembered feeling that the letter was important and she shared it with her middle son, Carter. "Mom, you need to put that to music," he said to Howard. After spending more time thinking about it, she showed it to Bill Anderson. He also encouraged Howard to record the letter as a song. Anderson and several session musicians helped create a musical background for the letter. With their assistance, a demo of the song was recorded in a studio. Despite her reluctance, Howard presented the demo to her producer Owen Bradley.

== Recording ==
After hearing the track, Bradley replied, "Jan, you've got to record this...it's your masterpiece." Bradley arranged for its official recording session to take place. Yet Howard had trouble avoiding her emotions as she began to record it. "I tried to put it down on tape, but I couldn't get through it without crying," she said in 2003. Bradley noticed that Howard was becoming emotional while recording and offered a proposition. "Tell you what, if you can get through it once, we'll take it, okay?" She agreed and she was able to sing the song one time in the studio. The official recording session took place on October 4, 1968 at Bradley's Barn, a studio located in Mount Juliet, Tennessee and owned by Bradley himself. Three additional tracks were cut in the same session, which later appeared on Howard's eponymous studio album. Howard was then given a seven-inch tape with the song on it, which she sent to Jimmy.

== Release and reception ==
In November 1968, the song (now titled "My Son") was released as a single by Decca Records. It was issued on a 7" vinyl record format featuring a cover of Bill Anderson's, "The Tip of My Fingers", on the B-side. "My Son" made its debut on the US Billboard Hot Country Songs chart on November 23, 1968. Spending 14 weeks there, it rose to the number 15 position on January 18, 1969. It ultimately became her sixth single to make the US country top 20. In Canada, "My Son" peaked at number 28 on the RPM Country Singles chart. It was Howard's final single as a solo artist to chart in Canada. The song was featured on Howard's seventh studio record, which was released in June 1969. Her performance of the song then received a nomination from the Grammy Awards in 1969, becoming one of two songs in her career to receive a nomination.

Howard's son was killed in battle two months following "My Son"'s release. After "My Son" became a commercial success, she received over 5,000 letters from veterans and their families. Since his death and the song's release, Howard has only been able to perform it on rare occasions. "And I still get so many requests for it, but I can't do that. I do it once in a great while only for a special thing like Veterans' [sic] Day", Howard said in 2015. Howard also has said that she is pleased with how "My Son" has been an inspiration for other military members and their families.

== Legacy ==
Since its release, "My Son" has received acclaim and attention from music journalists and historians. In their 2003 book, Finding Their Voice: The History of Women in Country Music, Mary A. Bufwack and Robert K. Oermann called the song "a moving recitation". Kevin John Coyne of Country Universe called it "her most personal song" in 2018. Lee Andresen recounted the story of "My Son" in his book Battle Notes: Music of the Vietnam War. Ken Burns also brought attention to the song in two of his documentaries; 2017's The Vietnam War and 2019's Country Music. In the latter, Burns described the song as "a mother's prayer for the safe return of her child." Burns interviewed Howard for his Vietnam War documentary, during which she told a story about antiwar protestors asking her to join them in response to Jimmy's death. Howard replied, "...go ahead and demonstrate. Have at it. . . . But I tell you what, if you ever ring my doorbell again, I'll blow your damned head off with a .357 Magnum."

== Track listings ==
7" vinyl single

- "My Son" – 2:46
- "The Tip of My Fingers" – 2:53

== Charts ==
=== Weekly charts ===
Weekly chart performance for "My Son"
Chart (1968–1969)	Peak position
Canada Country Tracks (RPM)	28
US Hot Country Songs (Billboard)	15

== Accolades ==
Year	Nominee / work	Award	Result	Ref.
1969	11th Annual Grammy Awards	Best Country Vocal Performance, Female	Nominated	
