= Jan Howard (1969 album) =

Studio album by Jan Howard
- Released: June 1969
- Genre: Country; Nashville Sound
- Label: Decca

Jan Howard chronology
Count Your Blessings, Woman (1968)	Jan Howard (1969)	For God and Country (1970)

Singles from Jan Howard
- 1. "I Still Believe in Love" Released: July 1968; 2. "My Son" Released: November 1968; 3. "When We Tried" Released: February 1969

Jan Howard is a studio album by American country artist Jan Howard. It was released by Decca Records in June 1969 and contained ten tracks. The project contained a series of cover tunes, along with new songs. Among the new recordings were three singles: "I Still Believe in Love", "My Son" and "When We Tried". "My Son" was a letter Howard put to music written to her son who was killed in the Vietnam War. The album was given positive reception by Cash Box and Record World magazines. The album made the US country albums and its three singles reached positions on the North American country songs charts.

== Background, recording and content ==
The wife of country music songwriter Harlan Howard, Jan Howard had her own recording career through the assistance of her husband. In 1960, she had a top 15 country single with "The One You Slip Around With". It was not until the mid-1960s that her recording career gained momentum. In 1966 she reached the top ten with "Evil on Your Mind", followed by "For Loving You" (a duet with Bill Anderson) and "My Son". The latter recording was one of the singles featured on her 1969 eponymous studio album. The project featured liner notes by Bill Anderson and consisted of ten tracks. "My Son" was self-penned by Howard herself and was originally written as a letter to her son who was later killed in the Vietnam War. The album also contained several cover tunes, including "Happy State of Mind", "Son of a Preacher Man", "When the Grass Grows Over Me", "Ribbon of Darkness" and "Until My Dreams Come True".

== Release and critical reception ==
Jan Howard was released by Decca Records in June 1969 and was her seventh studio album. It was distributed as a vinyl LP with five tracks on each side of the disc. It was among eight country music LP's released by the Decca label in June 1969. The album received positive reviews from music publications. Cash Box praised the project's production and Howard's vocal delivery: "Jan Howard's soulful vocals provide a set packed with emotion from beginning to end. Fine production enhances performances on a session with built-in appeal." Record World gave the album four stars praised the album's liner notes and thought the album would appeal to many listeners.

== Chart performance and singles ==
Jan Howard made its debut on the US Billboard Top Country Albums chart on July 12, 1969 and spent five weeks there. On July 19, the album peaked at the number 25 position and was her sixth album to make the chart. A total of three singles were included on the eponymous project. Its earliest single was "I Still Believe in Love" and was first issued by Decca in June 1968. It rose into the US Billboard country songs top 40, peaking at number 27. It also made the top ten on Canada's RPM country chart, peaking at number eight. "My Son" was also a single and was issued in November 1968 by the Decca label. In the US, it rose into the top 20, rising to number 15 on the country songs chart. In Canada, it rose into the top 30, climbing to number 28. Issued as a single in February 1969, "When We Tried" was the album's most recent single. It reached the top 40 on the US country chart, peaking at number 24.

== Track listing ==
Side one
No.	Title	Writer(s)	Length
1.	"When We Tried"	J. Chesnut	2:35
2.	"Until My Dreams Come True"	D. Frazier	2:14
3.	"Happy State of Mind"	B. Anderson	2:23
4.	"I Hurt All Over"	K. Arnold	2:35
5.	"My Son"	J. Howard	2:46

Side two
No.	Title	Writer(s)	Length
1.	"Son of a Preacher Man"	J. Hurley; R. Wilkins	2:25
2.	"When the Grass Grows Over Me"	D. Chapel	2:46
3.	"Ribbon of Darkness"	G. Lightfoot	2:36
4.	"I Still Believe in Love"	B. Anderson	2:05
5.	"Shame on Me"	L. Williams; B. Ennis	2:38

== Chart performance ==
Chart (1969)	Peak position
US Top Country Albums (Billboard)	25

== Release history ==
Region	Date	Format	Label	Ref.
North America	June 1969	Vinyl LP (stereo)	Decca Records	
United Kingdom	1970	Vinyl LP (mono); Vinyl LP (stereo)	MCA Records	
