= I Believe in Love =

I Believe in Love may refer to:

- "I Believe in Love" (Bonnie Guitar song), a 1968 song written by Boudleaux Bryant and recorded by American country artist, Bonnie Guitar
- "I Believe in Love" (Kenny Loggins song), a 1976 song written by Kenny Loggins and Alan and Marilyn Bergman and introduced by Barbra Streisand in A Star Is Born
- "Love Action (I Believe in Love)", a 1981 song by the British synthpop group The Human League
- "I Believe (In Love)", a 1970 song by the band Hot Chocolate
- "I Believe in Love", a song from the 1999 Paula Cole Band album Amen
- "I Believe in Love", a song from the 2001 Carola Häggkvist album My Show
- "I Believe in Love", a song written in 1970 and recorded for the soundtrack of the 2012 film Mirror Mirror
- The chorus of "God Part II", a 1988 song by U2

== See also ==
- "I Don't Believe in Love", a 1988 a song by progressive metal band Queensrÿche
- "I Believe in a Thing Called Love", a 2003 song by English rock band The Darkness
- "I Still Believe in Love", a 1968 single by American country music artist Jan Howard
- "Don't Believe in Love", a 2008 pop song performed by Dido
- Believe in Love (disambiguation)
- I Believe (disambiguation)
