= Stars of the Grand Ole Opry =

Stars of the Grand Ole Opry may refer to:

- Stars of the Grand Ole Opry (Jan Howard album), 1981
- Stars of the Grand Ole Opry (Jean Shepard album), 1981
