= Bad Seed (Jan Howard album) =

Studio album by Jan Howard
- Released: November 1966
- Genre: Country; Nashville Sound
- Label: Decca
- Producer: Owen Bradley

Jan Howard chronology
Jan Howard Sings Evil on Your Mind (1966)	Bad Seed (1966)	This Is Jan Howard Country (1967)

Singles from Bad Seed
- 1. "Bad Seed" Released: September 1966

Bad Seed is a studio album by American country music artist Jan Howard. It was released in November 1966 via Decca Records and featured 12 tracks. The third studio album of her recording career, Bad Seed was named for its title track, which reached the top ten of the country charts in 1966. The disc was met with a favorable review from Cashbox following its release.

== Background, recording and content ==
Jan Howard was the wife of country songwriter Harlan Howard and with his help, she secured her own recording contract. Her first commercial success was the top 20 country song "The One You Slip Around With" (1960). Her career stalled for several years until 1966 when "Evil on Your Mind" reached the country top five and was followed by "Bad Seed". Her second Decca studio album was named for the latter recording and was produced by Owen Bradley. Bad Seed consisted of 12 tracks whose songs were handpicked by Bradley and Howard, according to the liner notes. The album's tracks were mostly cover tunes of popular songs from the era. Among the covers were "The Tip of My Fingers", "Born a Woman", "The Hurtin's All Over", "I Get the Fever" and "There Goes My Everything".

== Release, critical reception, chart performance and singles ==
Bad Seed was released in November 1966 by Decca Records and was the third studio album in Howard's career. The label distributed it as a vinyl LP in both mono and stereo formats. Six tracks were featured on each side of the disc. Cash Box positively wrote in their review of the album, "Still showing real well with her latest smash single, 'Bad Seed,' Jan Howard follows through with this album effort which should go the same hitsville route." Bad Seed made its debut on the US Billboard Top Country Albums chart on December 17, 1966 and spent 14 weeks there. It eventually rose to the number 13 position, becoming Howard's second album to make the country chart and her third highest-charting solo album. Its only single was the title track, which first released by Decca in September 1967. It rose to number ten on the US Billboard country songs chart in late 1966.

== Track listing ==
Side one
No.	Title	Writer(s)	Length
1.	"I Get the Fever"	Bill Anderson	2:23
2.	"Time"	Michael Merchant	3:10
3.	"Ain't Had No Lovin'"	Dallas Frazier	2:27
4.	"The Tip of My Fingers"	Bill Anderson	2:53
5.	"Born a Woman"	Martha Sharp	2:05
6.	"That's Not My Problem Anymore"	Bobby Bare	2:25

Side two
No.	Title	Writer(s)	Length
1.	"Bad Seed"	Bill Anderson	2:53
2.	"Get Your Lie the Way You Want It"	Billy Mize	2:16
3.	"I've Heard the Wind Blow Before"	Gene Dobbins	2:14
4.	"I Wish I Could Fall in Love Again"	Harlan Howard; Wynn Stewart	2:46
5.	"The Hurtin's All Over"	Harlan Howard	2:34
6.	"There Goes My Everything"	Dallas Frazier	2:35

== Chart performance ==
Chart (1966–67)	Peak position
US Top Country Albums (Billboard)	13

== Release history ==
Region	Date	Format	Label	Ref.
United States	November 1966	Vinyl LP (Mono); Vinyl LP (Stereo)	Decca	
