= Believe in Love =

Believe in Love may refer to:

== Songs ==
- "Believe in Love" (Ravex song) 2009
- "Believe In Love", 1988 single by The Scorpions from the album Savage Amusement
- "Believe in Love", No.14 single by R&B singer Teddy Pendergrass, from A Little More Magic 1993
- "Believe In Love", song by The Fourmyula Mason 1970
- "Believe In Love", single by Jackie Rae Reed, Rae 1967
- "Believe In Love", Christian song by Russ Taff 1988
- "Believe In Love", single by Toni Arden P. F. Webster, Heinz Gietz 1956

== Other uses ==
- The Super Bowl 50 halftime show, where, at the end of the halftime show, the audience on the other side of Levi's Stadium participated in a card stunt, forming a rainbow pattern with the phrase "Believe in Love."

== See also ==
- I Don't Believe in Love a song by progressive metal band Queensrÿche 1988
- Do You Believe in Love the first top-ten hit for the American rock band Huey Lewis and the News 1982
- Don't Believe in Love song performed by Dido
- I Still Believe in Love
- I Believe in Love (disambiguation)
