= Jan Howard (1985 album) =

Studio album by Jan Howard
- Released: 1985
- Venue: Chelsea Studio; Nashville, Tennessee, U.S.
- Genre: Country
- Label: Dot/MCA
- Producer: Billy Strange

Jan Howard chronology
Tainted Love (1983)	Jan Howard (1985)

Jan Howard is the seventeenth studio album released by American country music singer Jan Howard. The album was released in 1985 in a joint venture with Dot Records and MCA Records. It was produced by Billy Strange. It is Howard's second eponymous studio album issued during her career. The record was also her final studio release. The album includes re-recordings of her previous singles as well as new tracks not previously recorded. It was released in a vinyl and cassette format.

== Background, content and release ==
Howard second self-titled studio album was recorded because of a joint venture between the Dot and MCA record labels. In this label collaboration, a series of studio albums were to be recorded that contained material released by "veteran" country artists. Howard was approached to record the project by its producer, Billy Strange. Howard wrote the album's liner notes and called her new record "a dream come true!" She also commented about the privilege of being chosen for the project, calling the invitation an honor.

The eponymous album was recorded in 1985 at the Chelsea Recording Studio, located in Nashville, Tennessee. All sessions were produced by Billy Strange, whom Howard had not worked with before. The album consisted of ten tracks which featured re-recordings of Howard's early hits and new material as well. Howard's early hits included her 1966 single "Evil on Your Mind" and 1969's "When We Tried". Remaining tracks were new material Howard had not cut previously. Among the album's newer material was cover version of The Oak Ridge Boys' "Ozark Mountain Jubilee", Lee Greenwood's "Dixie Road" and the song "The Wind Beneath My Wings". Jan Howard was officially released in 1985 via Dot/MCA Records. Upon its original release, the album was issued in both a vinyl record format and a cassette album format. It was among Howard's first cassette album releases. The record did not chart on any major recording magazines, including Billboard. The project did not spawn any known singles either.

== Track listing ==
Side one
No.	Title	Writer(s)	Length
1.	"When We Tried"	Jerry Chesnut	2:57
2.	"Ozark Mountain Jubilee"	Scott Anders; Roger Murrah	3:53
3.	"There's No Way"	John Jarrard; Lisa Palas; William Robinson	4:14
4.	"I Don't Think I've Got Another Love Left in Me"	Bucky Jones; James Johnson	3:13
5.	"Wind Beneath My Wings"	Larry Henley; Jeff Silbar	4:27

Side two
No.	Title	Writer(s)	Length
1.	"Evil on Your Mind"	Harlan Howard	3:03
2.	"When I See Love"	Judy Mehaffey	2:48
3.	"Dixie Road"	Don Goodman; Mary Ann Kennedy; Pam Rose	3:17
4.	"I Spent All My Love on You"	Eddie Burton; Dennis Knutson	3:03
5.	"Money Don't Make a Man a Lover"	Jarrard	3:58

== Personnel ==
All credits are adapted from the liner notes of Jan Howard.

Musical personnel

- Pete Brodonali – guitar
- Jimmy Capps – guitar, dobro
- Mary Fielder – background vocals
- David Humphreys – drums
- Jan Howard – lead vocals
- Terry McMillan – harmonica, percussion
- Tony Migiliore – keyboards, piano
- Kim Young – background vocals
- Curtis Young – background vocals

Technical personnel

- Chuck Haines – engineering
- Glenn Meadows – mastering
- Billy Strange – producer
- Kevin Smith – engineering

== Release history ==
Region	Date	Format	Label	Ref.
United States	1985	Vinyl	Dot Records/MCA Records	
United States	1985	Cassette	Dot Records/MCA Records	
