= Count Your Blessings, Woman (album) =

Studio album by Jan Howard
- Released: June 1968
- Genre: Country; Nashville Sound
- Label: Decca

Jan Howard chronology
| For Loving You (1968) | Count Your Blessings, Woman (1968) | Jan Howard (1969) |

Singles from Count Your Blessings, Woman
- 1. "Count Your Blessings, Woman" Released: February 1968

Count Your Blessings, Woman is a studio album by American country music artist Jan Howard. It was released in June 1968 via Decca Records and contained 11 tracks. Many of the album's tracks were cover tunes with the exception of the title track. Released as a single, the title track was a top 20 US country song and a top ten Canadian country song. The album itself made the top 30 of the US country survey. Howard's vocal performance was praised in reviews by Billboard and Cash Box magazines.

== Background, recording and content ==
The former wife of country songwriter Harlan Howard, Jan Howard was encouraged by her husband to sing professionally. With his help, her recording career began and by 1960, she had her first chart single with "The One You Slip Around With". As the decade progressed, Howard became known for more uptempo songs whose characters were often assertive women. Examples of this included "Evil on Your Mind", "Roll Over and Play Dead" and 1968's "Count Your Blessings, Woman". Howard's 1968 studio album would be named for the commercially-successful single. The album was a collection of 11 tracks. A series of cover tunes were included on Count Your Blessings, Woman. Among them were Jack Greene's "You Are My Treasure", Jimmie Rodgers's "It's Over", "Promises, Promises" and "You Better Sit Down Kids".

== Release and critical reception ==
Count Your Blessings, Woman was released by Decca Records in June 1968. Offered in both mono and stereo formats, it was distributed as a vinyl LP with six tracks on "side one" and five tracks on "side two". It was the fifth studio album in Howard's career. The album was given positive reviews from critics following its release. Billboard magazine wrote, "This one will melt off the shelves, for Miss Howard's performances are loaded with sincerity and heart." Cash Box also took note of Howard's vocal delivery on the album, writing, "The lark brings her warm, feelingful voice to bear on eleven striking numbers. Don't let this one out of your sight."

== Chart performance and singles ==
Count Your Blessings, Woman made its debut on the US Billboard Top Country Albums chart on July 6, 1968. It spent four weeks on the survey, rising to the number 27 position on July 20. It was Howard's fifth album to make the Billboard country chart and lowest-charting up to that point. The only single included on the album was the title track, which Decca first issued in February 1968. It later rose to the number 16 position on the US country songs chart and was Howard's fifth top 20 single on the singles survey. It was also Howard's first entry on Canada's country chart, rising to the number six position around the same time period.

== Track listing ==
Side one
| No. | Title | Writer(s) | Length |
|---|---|---|---|
| 1. | "Count Your Blessings, Woman" | Bill Anderson | 2:19 |
| 2. | "The Minute You're Gone" | Jimmy Gateley | 2:20 |
| 3. | "Promises, Promises" | Liz Anderson; William Smith; Carlye Hughey | 2:15 |
| 4. | "The Day the World Stood Still" | Jerry Foster; Bill Rice | 2:27 |
| 5. | "The Last Thing on My Mind" | Tom Paxton | 3:28 |
| 6. | "You Are My Treasure" | Cindy Walker | 3:16 |

Side two
| No. | Title | Writer(s) | Length |
|---|---|---|---|
| 1. | "You'd Better Sit Down Kids" | Sonny Bono | 3:58 |
| 2. | "Take Me to Your World" | Billy Sherrill; Glenn Sutton | 2:45 |
| 3. | "Thanks a Lot for Tryin' Anyway" | Jim Glaser | 2:22 |
| 4. | "But Not for Love My Dear" | Dallas Frazier | 2:59 |
| 5. | "It's Over" | Jimmie Rodgers | 2:11 |

== Personnel ==
All credits are adapted from the liner notes of Count Your Blessings, Woman.

- Hal Buksbaum – photography

== Chart performance ==
| Chart (1968) | Peak position |
|---|---|
| US Top Country Albums (Billboard) | 27 |

== Release history ==
| Region | Date | Format | Label | Ref. |
|---|---|---|---|---|
| North America | June 1968 | Vinyl LP (mono); Vinyl LP (stereo) | Decca Records | |
