= Sweethearts of Country Music =

Compilation album by Wynn Stewart and Jan Howard
- Released: 1960
- Genre: Country; Bakersfield sound
- Label: Challenge
- Producer: Joe Johnson

Wynn Stewart chronology
Sweethearts of Country Music (1960)	Wynn Stewart (1962)

Jan Howard chronology
Sweethearts of Country Music (1960)	Sweet and Sentimental (1962)

Sweethearts of Country Music is a compilation album by American country artists Wynn Stewart and Jan Howard. It was released in 1960 via Challenge Records and was produced by Joe Johnson. It was the debut album releases for both music artists and their only album releases for the Challenge label. A combination of solo and duet recordings by both artists are featured on the package.

== Background, content and release ==
Sweethearts of Country Music was compilation that featured a collection of songs Stewart and Howard had recorded for the Challenge label. By the release of this album, Stewart and Howard were both newly established artists that were recording on the west coast of the United States. This songs were recorded in a several year span and were packaged on this compilation for their first album release. The songs were produced by Joe Johnson.

The songs were recorded in the Bakersfield sound style of country music. Sweethearts of Country Music featured songs that recorded as duets by Stewart and Howard. This included their debut single release: "Yankee Go Gome." The pair's one charting single, "Wrong Company," was not featured on the album. It would later be released on a compilation in 2004.

Six additional sides are solo cuts by Stewart. This included his top five country hit, "Wishful Thinking." Four solo cuts by Howard also included. The first being her major hit, "The One You Slip Around With." Many of the album's songs were written by Harlan Howard, the then-husband of Jan Howard. Other songs featured writing credits from Stewart himself. Stewart wrote three songs that were included on the album.

Sweethearts of Country Music was released in 1960 via Challenge Records. It was the pair's debut albums in their careers and their only album releases for Challenge. The record was issued as a vinyl LP, containing six songs on each side of the record. The record did not reach any chart positions on Billboard upon its release. This included the Top Country Albums chart.

== Track listing ==
Side one
No.	Title	Writer(s)	Artist performing	Length
1.	"Wishful Thinking"	Wynn Stewart	Wynn Stewart
2.	"Above and Beyond (The Call of Love)"	Harlan Howard	Wynn Stewart
3.	"Playboy"	Eddie Miller; Bob Morris	Wynn Stewart
4.	"Heartaches for a Dime"	H. Howard	Wynn Stewart
5.	"Wrong Company"	H. Howard	Wynn Stewart and Jan Howard
6.	"We'll Never Love Again"	Howard	Wynn Stewart and Jan Howard

Side two
No.	Title	Writer(s)	Artist performing	Length
1.	"The One You Slip Around With"	H. Howard	Jan Howard
2.	"I Wish I Could Fall in Love Again"	H. Howard; Wynn Stewart	Jan Howard
3.	"If You Conscience Can't Stop You"	H. Howard	Jan Howard
4.	"Many Dreams Ago"	H. Howard	Jan Howard
5.	"Yankee Go Home"	H. Howard	Wynn Stewart and Jan Howard
6.	"How the Other Half Lives"	Beverley Stewart; W. Stewart	Wynn Stewart and Jan Howard

== Personnel ==
All credits are adapted from the liner notes of Sweethearts of Country Music.

- Jan Howard – lead vocals
- Joe Johnson – producer
- Wynn Stewart – lead vocals

== Release history ==
Region	Date	Format	Label	Ref.
United States	1960	Vinyl	Challenge Records	
