= What Makes a Man Wander? =

1964 single

Single by Jan Howard

from the album Jan Howard Sings Evil on Your Mind
- B-side: "Slipping Back to You"
- Released: October 1964
- Genre: Country
- Length: 2:41
- Label: Decca
- Songwriter: Harlan Howard
- Producer: Owen Bradley

Jan Howard singles chronology
"I Walked a Hundred Miles" (1964)	"What Makes a Man Wander?" (1964)	"I've Got Feelings Too" (1965)

"What Makes a Man Wander?" is a song written by Harlan Howard that was originally recorded by his wife and American country artist Jan Howard. Released as her first single for Decca Records, it made the top 40 of the US country chart in 1965. It was later released on her 1966 studio album Jan Howard Sings Evil on Your Mind.

== Background and recording ==
Jan Howard was the wife of country songwriter Harlan Howard and he helped her get her start as a recording artist. In 1960, she had her first top 20 single with "The One You Slip Around With" and would be followed by the 1962 top 30 song "I Wish I Was a Single Girl Again". "What Makes a Man Wander?" would ultimately be her next charting release two years later. The song was recorded shortly following Jan's signing with the Decca label, which had been arranged by her husband. Four demo tracks cut by Jan were presented to producer Owen Bradley, among them was "What Makes a Man Wander". According to Jan's autobiography, the song was officially recorded alongside The Nashville A-Team with Bradley serving as her producer. The song was recorded in Jan's first Decca session, according to Country Song Roundup.

== Release and chart performance ==
Bradley and Harlan Howard believed "What Makes a Man Wander?" would be "a hit" and it was ultimately released as her first Decca single. The label issued it as a seven-inch vinyl single in October 1964 and featured a B-side called "Slipping Back to You". "What Makes a Man Wander?" was Jan's fourth single to make the US Billboard Hot Country Songs chart, making its debut on January 16, 1965. Spending 13 weeks there, it reached the number 25 position on March 13. It was Jan's second highest-peaking release on the country songs chart and she would not chart again until the release of "Evil on Your Mind" in 1966. The song was later included on her 1966 studio album Jan Howard Sings Evil on Your Mind.

== Track listing ==
7" vinyl single

- "What Makes a Man Wander?" – 2:41
- "Slipping Back to You" – 2:27

== Charts ==
=== Weekly charts ===
Weekly chart performance for "What Makes a Man Wander?"
Chart (1965)	Peak position
US Hot Country Songs (Billboard)	25
