= Sweet and Sentimental =

Studio album by Jan Howard with The Jordanaires
- Released: October 1962
- Genre: Country; pop
- Label: Capitol
- Producer: Ken Nelson

Jan Howard with The Jordanaires chronology
Sweethearts of Country Music (1960)	Sweet and Sentimental (1962)	Jan Howard Sings Evil on Your Mind (1966)

Singles from Sweet and Sentimental
- 1. "Looking Back" Released: November 1962

Sweet and Sentimental is the debut studio album by American country artist Jan Howard. Credit was also given to the album's backing group The Jordanaires. It was released by Capitol Records in October 1962 and consisted of 12 tracks. The album was originally meant to be issued on Howard's former record label until it was bought by Capitol. After several setbacks recording the album, the project was finished under the production of Ken Nelson. It received a positive response from Billboard magazine following its release.

== Background ==
The wife of country songwriter Harlan Howard, Jan Howard was given the opportunity to become a recording artist with her husband's insistence. At Challenge Records, her first singles were issued, including the top 20 song "The One You Slip Around With" (1960). According to Howard, a studio album of material was intended to be released through Challenge. This plan was delayed after Harlan and producer Joe Johnson allowed Capitol Records to buy out her Challenge contract without her permission. After a court battle and Harlan's insistence, Howard ultimately agreed to her contractual obligations. Ultimately, her first studio album would be recorded and released with the Capitol label.

== Recording and content ==
Howard then flew to Los Angeles, California to record her first Capitol album. The original producer set to record the album was "drunk" and had found "lousy" songs, according to Howard. She instead insisted on Ken Nelson producing her first album, which he ultimately agreed to. Nelson then brought in The Jordanaires quartet sing background vocals on the album. Capitol's "foreign product" executive believed Howard to be a pop artist (rather than the country music she was doing) and encouraged Nelson to find pop material to record.

Upon walking into her first recording session, Howard was shocked when she discovered that Nelson had brought in a string section and removed the country instrumentation she was used to. Howard then walked out of the session after she found some of the session musicians to be rude and off-putting. Angry that his wife walked out of the session, Harlan Howard encouraged his wife to finish the session and the album was ultimately recorded under Nelson's production. Sweet and Sentimental was a collection of 12 tracks, most of which were cover tunes. Among them were Doris Day's "Everybody Loves a Lover", Guy Mitchell/Ray Price's "Heartaches by the Number" and Willie Nelson's "Funny How Time Slips Away". Six of the songs were penned by Harlan Howard. One new recording, "This Sad Old House", was co-written with Carlos Minor and it was his first cut on an album.

== Release, critical reception and singles ==
Sweet and Sentimental was released by Capitol Records in October 1962. It was distributed as a vinyl LP, with six songs on either side of the record. The album was offered in both mono and stereo formats. The Jordanaires were given equal credit on the album's release. The album was re-issued with only ten tracks by Tower Records in 1967 under the title Lonely Country. Sweet and Sentimental was then released to digital formats in 2013 through Marmot Music. It was given positive reception by Billboard magazine, which gave it four stars. "Gal has a sincere, pleasing style and she's at home with all These tunes. Each one gets the Nashville vocal and combo backing," the publication concluded. Howard's cover of "Looking Back" was then released as a single by Capitol in November 1962.

== Track listing ==
Side one
No.	Title	Writer(s)	Length
1.	"Don't Worry"	Marty Robbins	2:50
2.	"Funny How Time Slips Away"	Willie Nelson	2:37
3.	"Looking Back"	Brook Benton; Belford Hendricks; Clyde Otis	3:05
4.	"Padre"	Alan Webster; Peter F. Webster	2:51
5.	"Belle of the Ball"	Harlan Howard; Buck Owens	2:34
6.	"Everybody Loves a Lover"	Robert Allen; Richard Adler	2:21

Side two
No.	Title	Writer(s)	Length
1.	"This Sad Old House"	Harlan Howard; Carlos Minor	2:45
2.	"He Called Me Baby"	Harlan Howard	2:29
3.	"They Listened While You Said Goodbye"	Harlan Howard	2:38
4.	"You'd Better Go"	Harlan Howard; Wynn Stewart	2:24
5.	"Is This My Destiny"	Helen Carter	2:46
6.	"Heartaches by the Number"	Harlan Howard	2:16

== Technical personnel ==
All credits are adapted from the liner notes of Sweet and Sentimental.

- The Jordanaires – Background vocals
- Ken Nelson – Producer
- Ken Weedler – Cover photo

== Release history ==
Region	Date	Format	Label	Ref.
North America	August 1962	Vinyl	Capitol Records	
North America	January 7, 2013	Music download; streaming	Marmot Music	
