= Dis-Satisfied =

Single by Bill Anderson and Jan Howard

from the album Bill and Jan (Or Jan and Bill)
- B-side: "Knowing You're Mine"
- Released: September 1971
- Genre: Country
- Label: Decca
- Songwriters: Bill Anderson, Carter Howard, Jan Howard
- Producer: Owen Bradley

Bill Anderson singles chronology
"Quits" (1971)	"Dis-Satisfied" (1971)	"All the Lonely Women in the World" (1972)

Jan Howard singles chronology
"Dallas, You've Won" (1971)	"Dis-Satisfied" (1969)	"Love Is Like a Spinning Wheel" (1971)

"Dis-Satisfied" is a single by American country music artists Bill Anderson and Jan Howard. Released in September 1971, it was the second single and from their album Bill and Jan (Or Jan and Bill). The song reached #4 on the Billboard Hot Country Singles chart. The single became the duo's final major hit and charting single. The song additionally peaked at #11 on the Canadian RPM Country Tracks chart.

== Chart performance ==
Chart (1971–1972)	Peak position
U.S. Billboard Hot Country Singles	4
CAN RPM Country Tracks	11
