= Jan Howard Sings Evil on Your Mind =

Studio album by Jan Howard
- Released: July 1966
- Genre: Country; Nashville Sound; pop
- Label: Decca
- Producer: Owen Bradley

Jan Howard chronology
Sweet and Sentimental (1962)	Jan Howard Sings Evil on Your Mind (1966)	Bad Seed (1966)

Singles from Jan Howard Sings Evil on Your Mind
- 1. "What Makes a Man Wander?" Released: October 1964; 2. "I've Got Feelings Too" Released: May 1965; 3. "You Don't Find a Good Man Everyday" Released: October 1965; 4. "Evil on Your Mind" Released: April 1966

Jan Howard Sings Evil on Your Mind is a studio album by American country artist Jan Howard. It was released in July 1966 by Decca Records and was her second studio album. The project consisted of 12 tracks featuring both uptempo and ballad material. Its title track was a top five US country song in 1966 and was one of four singles on the album. Another was the charting 1964 song "What Makes a Man Wander?". The album itself made the US country survey following its release and received critical reception from Cash Box magazine.

== Background ==
The wife of country music songwriter Harlan Howard, Jan Howard was encouraged to have her own recording career from her husband who liked her singing. He helped her secure her first recording contract in the 1950s and she had her first top 20 song with 1960's "The One You Slip Around With". After a stint with Capitol Records that resulted in one charting single, she signed with Decca Records where she ultimately had her greatest commercial success. In Jan's autobiography, she claimed that her Decca producer Owen Bradley found it difficult to individualize her recording style. With limited success at the label, she and Bradley then chose to record Harlan Howard's "Evil on Your Mind". Its success crafted the creation of Jan Howard Sings Evil on Your Mind.

== Recording and content ==
Jan Howard Sings Evil on Your Mind was produced solely by Owen Bradley and consisted of 12 tracks. According to Jan, seven more songs were made into a demo format before ultimately being recorded and put into the album's track listing. The project's liner notes explain that a mixture of ballads and uptempo songs were included to fit a wide array of listening audiences. Along with the title track, Harlan Howard composed five songs on the project. The other four were "What Makes a Man Wander", "You Really Know", "You Don't Find a Good Man Everyday" and "Last Time" (co-written with Gene Myers). The album also included covers of "Put It Off Until Tomorrow" and "We'll Sing in the Sunshine". Jan herself self-penned the track "Crying for Love".

== Release, critical reception and chart performance ==
Jan Howard Sings Evil on Your Mind was released in July 1966 on Decca Records. It was the second studio album of Jan's career and her first with the Decca label. The label distributed it as a vinyl LP offered in both mono and stereo formats. It featured six tracks on each side of the disc. The project was given a positive critical response from Cash Box magazine in July 1966, calling two of its tracks ("Take Good Care of Him" and "Put It Off Until Tomorrow") "grooves" that will help audiences "be out in force" to buy it. They also wrote, "Hearty and full-flavored are the artist’s stylings here, set to a heap of items that have already proven their sales ability." The album was Jan's first to enter the US Billboard Top Country Albums chart. Making its debut on August 6, 1966, it spent 20 weeks there and reached the number ten position on September 3. It was her second highest-charting album on the chart and first to make the top ten there as well.

== Singles ==
A total of four singles were included on Jan Howard Sings Evil on Your Mind. Its earliest single was "What Makes a Man Wander", which Decca first issued as a single in October 1964. It was one of two singles to make the US Hot Country Songs chart and peaked at the number 25 position there. Its second release was "I've Got Feelings Too" (issued by Decca in May 1965). In October 1965, "You Don't Find a Good Man Everyday" was issued as a single. Yet its most successful release was the title track and was issued in April 1966. It later rose to the number five position on the US country songs chart, becoming one of six top ten singles in Jan's career.

== Track listing ==
Side one
No.	Title	Writer(s)	Length
1.	"Last Time"	Harlan Howard; Gene Myers	2:19
2.	"Put It Off Until Tomorrow"	Bill Owens; Dolly Parton	2:48
3.	"Tippy Toeing"	Bobby Harden	2:00
4.	"I've Got Feelings Too"	Helen Carter	2:34
5.	"What Makes a Man Wander?"	Harlan Howard	2:41
6.	"You Go Your Way (I'll Go Crazy)"	Mabel Cordle; Benny Williams	2:37

Side two
No.	Title	Writer(s)	Length
1.	"Evil on Your Mind"	Harlan Howard	2:16
2.	"Take Good Care of Him"	Arthur Kent; Ed Warren	2:12
3.	"You Don't Find a Good Man Everyday"	Harlan Howard	2:00
4.	"Crying for Love"	Jan Howard	2:23
5.	"You Really Know"	Harlan Howard	2:36
6.	"We'll Sing in the Sunshine"	Gale Garnett	2:47

== Chart performance ==
Chart (1966)	Peak position
US Top Country Albums (Billboard)	10

== Release history ==
Region	Date	Format	Label	Ref.
North America	June 1966	Vinyl LP (Mono); Vinyl LP (Stereo)	Decca Records	
