= When We Tried =

Single by Jan Howard

from the album Jan Howard
- B-side: "I Hurt All Over"
- Released: February 1969
- Genre: Country
- Length: 2:35
- Label: Decca
- Songwriter(s): Jerry Chesnut

Jan Howard singles chronology
"My Son" (1968)	"When We Tried" (1969)	"We Had All the Good Things Going" (1969)

"When We Tried" is a song written by Jerry Chesnut that was originally recorded by American country artist Jan Howard. Released as a single by Decca Records, it made the top 40 on the US country chart in 1969. It was given a positive review by Cash Box magazines and appeared on her eponymous 1969 studio album.

== Background and content ==
Jan Howard was the former wife of country music songwriter Harlan Howard. With his assistance and encouragement, she embarked on her own recording career. Signing with Decca Records, Howard had a series of chart recordings including "Evil on Your Mind" (1966) and the chart-topping duet with Bill Anderson "For Loving You" (1968). Among her 1960s chart records was "When We Tried", which was composed by Jerry Chesnut.

== Release, critical reception and chart performance ==
"When We Tried" was issued as a single by Decca Records in February 1969. It was distributed by the label as a seven-inch vinyl record with an included B-side called "I Hurt All Over". Cash Box magazine named it among its "Picks of the Week" and wrote, "The flowing, contemporary folk flavor that has come to be so much in vogue, highlights what should be another big one for Jan." Billboard predicted it would be "her biggest hit to date" and called the song "powerful". The publication also predicted it would make the top 20 of their country chart. However, it only made the top 40. "When We Tried" made its debut on the US Billboard Hot Country Songs chart on March 8, 1969. Spending 11 weeks there, it rose to the number 24 position on April 26. It was Howard's fourteenth top 40 song on the US country chart in her career. It was also the third single spawned from her 1969 eponymous album.

== Track listing ==
7" vinyl single

- "When We Tried" – 2:35
- "I Hurt All Over" – 2:35

== Charts ==
Weekly chart performance for "When We Tried"
Chart (1969)	Peak position
US Hot Country Songs (Billboard)	24
