= Bill and Jan (Or Jan and Bill) =

Studio album by Bill Anderson and Jan Howard
- Released: January 1972
- Recorded: 1970 – 1971
- Venues: Bradley's Barn, Mount Juliet, Tennessee
- Genre: Country
- Label: Decca
- Producer: Owen Bradley

Bill Anderson chronology
Bill Anderson's Greatest Hits, Vol. 2 (1971)	Bill and Jan (Or Jan and Bill) (1972)	Singing His Praise (1972)

Jan Howard chronology
Rock Me Back to Little Rock (1970)	Bill and Jan (Or Jan and Bill) (1972)	Love Is Like a Spinning Wheel (1972)

Singles from Bill and Jan (Or Jan and Bill)
- 1. "Someday We'll Be Together" Released: May 1970; 2. "Dis-Satisfied" Released: September 1971

Bill and Jan (Or Jan and Bill) is a studio album released by American country artists Bill Anderson and Jan Howard. It was released in January 1972 on Decca Records and was produced by Owen Bradley. It was the duo's third collaborative album together and featured singles that became hits on the Billboard country chart. The album itself would also chart on the Billboard country albums list in 1972.

== Background and content ==
Bill and Jan (Or Jan and Bill) was recorded in several sessions between 1970 and 1971. All sessions were held at producer Owen Bradley's studio, Bradley's Barn, in Mount Juliet, Tennessee. Bradley had been Anderson and Howard's producer since first collaborating in 1965. He had also been producing both artists separately on the Decca label.

The album consisted of 11 tracks. Many of the tracks recorded for the album were cover versions of songs recorded by other artists. Among these songs was Webb Pierce's "More and More". The release also contained songs written by Anderson. These included "No Thanks I Just Had One" and "Knowing You're Mine".

== Release and reception ==
Bill and Jan (Or Jan and Bill was released in January 1972 on Decca Records in a vinyl record format. On the first side, 5 songs were included and 6 songs were included on the flip side. The album reached number 9 on the Billboard Top Country Albums chart in April 1972. It became the duo's second album to reach the top 10 of that chart.

The album featured two singles that both became top 10 hits. The first was a cover of "Someday We'll Be Together", which reached number 4 on the Billboard Hot Country Singles chart in April 1970. The second single, "Dis-Satisfied", reached number 4 on the Billboard country songs chart in December 1971.

Both singles also became major hits on the Canadian RPM Country Tracks chart during this time. The highest-charting was "Dis-Satisfied", which reached number 3 in 1970.

Bill and Jan (Or Jan and Bill) was reviewed by Allmusic, receiving 2.5 out of 5 stars.

== Track listing ==
Side one
No.	Title	Writer(s)	Length
1.	"Dis-Satisfied"	Bill Anderson; Carter Howard; Jan Howard	3:00
2.	"I Don't Want It"	Jerry Chesnut	2:25
3.	"Satin Sheets"	John Volinkaty	2:39
4.	"We"	Don Reid	2:56
5.	"Knowing You're Mine"	Anderson	2:42

Side two
No.	Title	Writer(s)	Length
1.	"Beautiful People"	Kenny O'Dell	2:33
2.	"More and More"	Merle Kilgore; Webb Pierce	2:11
3.	"Don't Let It Happen Without Me"	Danny Samson; Ruby VanNoy	2:27
4.	"No Thanks I Just Had One"	Anderson	2:03
5.	"Looking Back to See"	Jim Ed Brown; Maxine Brown	2:05
6.	"Someday We'll Be Together"	Johnny Bristol; Jackey Beavers; Harvey Fuqua	2:46

== Personnel ==
All credits are adapted from the liner notes of Bill and Jan (Or Jan and Bill).

Musical and technical personnel

- Bill Anderson – lead vocals
- Harold Bradley – guitar
- Owen Bradley – producer
- Steve Chapman – guitar
- Ray Edenton – guitar
- Buddy Harman – drums
- Jan Howard – lead vocals
- Roy Huskey – bass
- The Jordanaires – background vocals
- Hal Rugg – steel guitar
- Jerry Smith – piano
- Jimmy Woodard – organ

== Chart performance ==
Chart (1972)	Peak position
US Top Country Albums (Billboard)	9

== Release history ==
Region	Date	Format	Label	Ref.
Canada	1972	Vinyl	MCA	
United States	1972	Vinyl	Decca	
