= Singing His Praise =

Studio album by Bill Anderson and Jan Howard
- Released: March 1972
- Recorded: February 1972
- Studios: Bradley's Barn, Mount Juliet, Tennessee
- Genres: Country; gospel
- Label: Decca
- Producer: Owen Bradley

Bill Anderson chronology
| Bill and Jan (Or Jan and Bill) (1972) | Singing His Praise (1972) | Bill Anderson Sings for "All the Lonely Women in the World" (1972) |

Jan Howard chronology
| Bill and Jan (Or Jan and Bill) (1972) | Singing His Praise (1972) | Sincerely, Jan Howard (1975) |

Singing His Praise is a studio album by American country artists Bill Anderson and Jan Howard. It was released in March 1972 on Decca Records and was produced by Owen Bradley. It was the pair's first album collection of gospel songs and it would also be the duo's final album together.

== Background and content ==
Singing His Praise was recorded in February 1972 at Bradley's Barn, a studio owned by the album's producer, Owen Bradley. Anderson and Howard had been collaborating with Bradley since their first studio release together in 1967. Bradley also contributed to both of the artists individual career. The album consisted of 11 tracks and was the duo's first album collection of gospel music. Anderson and Howard selected gospel music they enjoyed performing together while on tour as well as material they had not yet performed. Many of these songs were hymns such as "Swing Low, Sweet Chariot", "Precious Memories" and "The Lord's Prayer".

Singing His Praise was released in March 1972 via Decca Records in a vinyl record format. It included 6 songs on the first side and 5 songs on the second side.

== Track listing ==
Side one
| No. | Title | Writer(s) | Length |
|---|---|---|---|
| 1. | "Swing Low, Sweet Chariot" | traditional | 2:30 |
| 2. | "Take My Hand, Precious Lord" | Thomas A. Dorsey | 3:05 |
| 3. | "The Old Country Church" | J. D. Sumner | 3:14 |
| 4. | "Nearer, My God, to Thee" | traditional | 3:50 |
| 5. | "Just a Closer Walk with Thee" | traditional | 3:10 |
| 6. | "Where No One Stands Alone" | Mosie Lister | 3:06 |

Side two
| No. | Title | Writer(s) | Length |
|---|---|---|---|
| 1. | "Precious Memories" | traditional | 2:40 |
| 2. | "The Old Rugged Cross" | George Bennard | 2:55 |
| 3. | "Beyond the Sunset" | Sam Gobble; Bob Nolan | 2:50 |
| 4. | "They'll Be Peace in the Valley for Me" | Thomas A. Dorsey | 2:50 |
| 5. | "The Lord's Prayer" | Albert Hay Malotte | 2:42 |

== Personnel ==
All credits are adapted from the liner notes of Singing His Praise.

Musical and technical personnel

- Bill Anderson – lead vocals
- Harold Bradley – guitar
- Owen Bradley – producer
- Ray Edenton – guitar
- Buddy Harman – drums
- Jan Howard – lead vocals
- Roy Huskey – bass
- The Jordanaires – background vocals
- Grady Martin – guitar
- Hargus "Pig" Robbins – piano
- Hal Rugg – steel guitar
- Karen Shearer – liner notes
- Pete Wade – guitar

== Release history ==
| Region | Date | Format | Label | Ref. |
|---|---|---|---|---|
| United States | March 1972 | Vinyl | Decca | |
