= For Loving You (album) =

Studio album by Bill Anderson and Jan Howard
- Released: February 1968
- Recorded: 1965 – 1967
- Studios: Bradley's Barn, Mount Juliet, Tennessee; Columbia, Nashville, Tennessee
- Label: Decca
- Producer: Owen Bradley

Bill Anderson chronology
Bill Anderson's Greatest Hits (1967)	For Loving You (1968)	Bill Anderson's Country Style (1968)

Jan Howard chronology
This Is Jan Howard Country (1967)	For Loving You (1967)	Count Your Blessings, Woman (1968)

Singles from For Loving You
- 1. "For Loving You" Released: October 1967

For Loving You is a studio album released by the American country music artists Bill Anderson and Jan Howard in February 1968 on Decca Records. The album was their first collaborative album, setting the trend for a series of studio albums over the next few years. The album's title track, "For Loving You", was the lead single and became a number 1 hit on the Billboard country songs chart.

== Background and content ==
For Loving You was recorded in several sessions between 1965 and 1967 in two separate Nashville-area studios, Bradley's Barn and the Columbia Recording Studios. The sessions were produced by Owen Bradley, who had previously collaborated with both Anderson and Howard. The album consisted of 11 tracks. Several of them were cover versions of songs recorded by other artists. Among these was Johnny Cash's "I Walk the Line", Bing Crosby's "Have I Told You Lately That I Love You?" and Don Robertson's "Born to Be with You". Among the new songs was the title track. The album was the first collaboration between Anderson and Howard, both of whom had been recording separately for the Decca label during the 1960s.

== Release and reception ==
For Loving You was officially released in February 1968 by Decca Records in a vinyl record format. Six songs appeared on side one and five songs appeared on side two of the record. The album reached a peak position of 6 on the Billboard Top Country Albums chart in March 1968. The album's only single was the title track, which was released in late 1967. It peaked at number 1 on the Billboard Hot Country Singles chart in December 1967. The song was Anderson's third number 1 single and Howard's only number 1. It also peaked at number 9 on the Canadian RPM Country Tracks chart.

For Loving You received positive reviews from critics. Greg Adams of Allmusic gave the release 3 out of 5 stars, calling it "thematic", but criticized the lack of material from Anderson, who is a "talented and prolific songwriter".

== Track listing ==
Side one
No.	Title	Writer(s)	Length
1.	"For Loving You"	Steve Karliski; Rossini Pinto	2:43
2.	"Above and Beyond (The Call of Love)"	Harlan Howard	2:18
3.	"I Love You Because"	Leon Payne	2:24
4.	"I'd Fight the World"	Joe Allison; Hank Cochran	2:44
5.	"I Walk the Line"	Johnny Cash	2:30
6.	"Till Death Do Us Part"	C.M. Bradley; Eric Leiser	2:18

Side two
No.	Title	Writer(s)	Length
1.	"I Thank God for You"	Bill Anderson; Mike Cloer	2:29
2.	"Have I Told You Lately That I Love You?"	Scott Wiseman	3:00
3.	"Born to Be with You"	Don Robertson	2:40
4.	"I'll Be Waiting"	Anderson; Moneen Carpenter	2:45
5.	"Beyond the Sunset"	Sam Gobble; Bob Nolan	2:50

== Personnel ==
All credits are adapted from the liner notes of For Loving You.

Musical and technical personnel

- Bill Anderson – lead vocals
- Harold Bradley – guitar
- Owen Bradley – producer
- Floyd Cramer – piano
- Ray Edenton – guitar
- Jan Howard – lead vocals
- Roy Huskey – bass
- The Jordanaires – background vocals
- Jimmy Lance – guitar
- Len Miller – drums
- Hal Rugg – steel guitar
- Jerry Shook – guitar
- Jerry Smith – piano

== Chart performance ==
Chart (1968)	Peak position
US Top Country Albums (Billboard)	6

== Release history ==
Region	Date	Format	Label	Ref.
Canada	February 1968	Vinyl	Decca	
United Kingdom	February 1968	Vinyl	MCA	
United States	February 1968	Vinyl	Decca	
