= Count Your Blessings, Woman =

Single by Jan Howard

from the album Count Your Blessings, Woman
- B-side: "But Not for My Love, My Dear"
- Released: February 1968
- Genre: Country
- Length: 2:19
- Label: Decca
- Songwriter: Bill Anderson

Jan Howard singles chronology
"For Loving You" (1967)	"Count Your Blessings, Woman" (1968)	"I Still Believe in Love" (1968)

"Count Your Blessings, Woman" is a song written by Bill Anderson that was originally recorded by American country artist Jan Howard. Released as a single in 1968, it placed in the top 20 on the US country chart and the top ten on the Canadian country chart. It was released on an album of the same name and was given reviews from both Billboard and Cash Box magazines.

== Background, recording and content ==
The former wife of country music songwriter, Harlan Howard, Jan Howard forged her own country music recording career with the encouragement of her husband. Her 1960 single "The One You Slip Around With" made the US country charts but she would have her greatest commercial success in the mid-1960s. During this period, her solo repertoire was identified with uptempo songs that portrayed assertive women. Examples of such songs was 1968's "Count Your Blessings, Woman". The song was written by Bill Anderson.

== Release, critical reception and chart performance ==
"Count Your Blessings, Woman" was released as a single by Decca Records in February 1968. It was distributed as a seven-inch vinyl record featuring the B-side "But Not for Love My Dear". In describing both the A-side and B-side, Cash Box magazine called it "a package of strong material", believing it would "make big moves" on the record charts. Billboard called it "a strong rhythm item with a clever lyric line" and predicted it would make the top 20 of their country survey. This was proven fact when "Count Your Blessings, Woman" made their top 20 chart later that year. Making its debut on the US Billboard Hot Country Songs on March 9, 1968, it spent 13 weeks there and rose to the number 16 position on May 11. It became Howard's fifth top 20 entry on the Billboard country chart. In addition, it reached the top ten on Canada's RPM Country Tracks chart, rising to number eight. It was Howard's first entry on the Canadian country chart. The song served as the title track to Howard's 1968 studio album.

== Track listing ==
7" vinyl single

- "Count Your Blessings, Woman" – 2:19
- "But Not for Love My Dear" – 2:59

== Charts ==
Weekly chart performance for "Count Your Blessings, Woman"
Chart (1968)	Peak position
Canada Country Tracks (RPM)	6
US Hot Country Songs (Billboard)	16
