= I Still Believe in Love =

Single by Jan Howard

from the album Jan Howard
- B-side: "Life's That Way"
- Released: July 1968
- Genre: Country
- Length: 2:05
- Label: Decca
- Songwriter: Bill Anderson

Jan Howard singles chronology
"Count Your Blessings, Woman" (1968)	"I Still Believe in Love" (1968)	"My Son" (1968)

"I Still Believe in Love" is a song written by Bill Anderson that was originally recorded by American country artist Jan Howard. Released as a single by Decca Records, it made the top 40 on the US country chart and the top ten on the Canadian country chart. It was given reviews from both Billboard and Cash Box magazines.

== Background and content ==
The wife of country music songwriter Harlan Howard, Jan Howard forged her own recording career in the 1960s decade. He wrote his wife's first commercial success called "The One You Slip Around With", yet more of her 1960s singles would be written by singer-songwriter Bill Anderson. She would later record duets with Anderson as well. Anderson wrote her solo singles including "Bad Seed" and "I Still Believe in Love". The song was described as a song about romance and was recorded with an uptempo rhythm section.

== Release, critical reception and chart performance ==
"I Still Believe in Love" was released as a single by Decca Records in July 1968. It was distributed as a seven-inch vinyl single with a B-side: "Life's That Way". Cash Box called the track "light and breezy" while Billboard predicted the song would make the top 20 of their country chart. "I Still Believe in Love" ultimately peaked in the top 40 but not the top 20. Making its debut on the US Billboard Hot Country Songs chart on August 6, 1968, it spent 11 weeks there before rising to the number 27 position on October 5. Yet on Canada's RPM Country Tracks chart it made the top ten, rising to the number eight position. It was her second charting single in Canada. The song was the lead single to Howard's 1969 eponymous album.

== Track listing ==
7" vinyl single

- "I Still Believe in Love" – 2:05
- "Life's That Way" – 2:27

== Charts ==
Weekly chart performance for "I Still Believe in Love"
Chart (1968)	Peak position
Canada Country Tracks (RPM)	8
US Hot Country Songs (Billboard)	27
