= Bad Seed (Jan Howard song) =

Single by Jan Howard

from the album Bad Seed
- B-side: "You Go Your Way (I'll Go Crazy)"
- Released: September 1966
- Genre: Country; pop
- Length: 2:53
- Label: Decca
- Songwriter: Bill Anderson
- Producer: Owen Bradley

Jan Howard singles chronology
| "Evil on Your Mind" (1966) | "Bad Seed" (1966) | "Any Old Way You Do" (1967) |

"Bad Seed" is a song written by Bill Anderson that was originally recorded by American country artist Jan Howard. Released as a single by Decca Records, it was the second top ten song on the US country chart in Howard's career. It was given reviews by Billboard, Cash Box and Wide Open Country.

== Background, content and recording ==
Country music songwriter Harlan Howard encouraged his wife Jan Howard to have her own singing career. Helping her get a recording contract, Howard had her first top 20 country song with 1960's "The One You Slip Around With". Her career then stalled until the release of the 1966 top five song "Evil on Your Mind". Many of Howard's 1960s singles were written by singer-songwriter Bill Anderson, whom she later recorded with. The first Anderson-penned track was 1966's "Bad Seed". The song described the gypsy lifestyle of a woman who refuses to settle down with a man. "Bad Seed" was produced by Owen Bradley.

== Release, critical reception and chart performance ==
"Bad Seed" was released as a single by Decca Records in September 1966 as a seven-inch vinyl single featuring a B-side titled "You Go Your Way (I'll Go Crazy)". The promotional version of the single titled the song as "Bad Seeds". The single was given reviews from two music publications. This included Cash Box who found the track to be an "excellent song" and "rhythmic". Billboard found Howard to have "strong vocal work" and along with "clever" lyrics. In addition, the publication believed the song would make the top ten of the country list. In later years, music website Wide Open Country named it one of the "5 Definitive Songs" in Howard's career. As predicted, "Bad Seed" made the top ten of the US Billboard Hot Country Songs chart. Making its debut on October 8, 1966, it spent 13 weeks there and reached the number ten position by November 5, 1966. It was the second top ten single in Howard's career and final top ten solo single in her career. Her additional top ten songs were duets with Bill Anderson. The song was released on Howard's album of the same name in 1967.

== Track listings ==
7" vinyl single

- "Bad Seed" – 2:53
- "You Go Your Way (I'll Go Crazy)" – 2:37

== Charts ==
Weekly chart performance for "Bad Seed"
| Chart (1966) | Peak position |
|---|---|
| US Hot Country Songs (Billboard) | 10 |
