= For Loving You =

1967 song by Bill Anderson and Jan Howard

Single by Bill Anderson and Jan Howard

from the album For Loving You
- B-side: "Untouchables"
- Released: October 16, 1967
- Genre: Country
- Label: Decca
- Songwriter: Steve Karliski/Pinto Rossini
- Producer: Owen Bradley

Bill Anderson singles chronology
"No One's Gonna Hurt You Anymore" (1967)	"For Loving You" (1967)	"Stranger on the Run" (1967)

Jan Howard singles chronology
"Roll Over and Play Dead" (1967)	"For Loving You" (1967)	"Count Your Blessings, Woman" (1968)

"For Loving You" is a 1967 duet by Bill Anderson and Jan Howard. The single was the duo's most successful release. "For Loving You" went to number one on the country charts in four weeks and spent 20 weeks on the chart.

== Chart performance ==
=== Bill Anderson and Jan Howard ===
Chart (1967)	Peak position
Canada RPM Country Tracks	9
US Billboard Hot Country Singles	1

== Cover versions ==
- A year later, Skeeter Davis and Don Bowman charted a cover version which went to number 72 on the same chart.

=== Skeeter Davis and Don Bowman ===
Chart (1968)	Peak position
Canada RPM Country Tracks	18
US Billboard Hot Country Singles	72
