= Evil on Your Mind =

1966 single

Single by Jan Howard

from the album Jan Howard Sings Evil on Your Mind
- B-side: "Crying for Love"
- Released: March 1966
- Genre: Country
- Length: 2:16
- Label: Decca
- Songwriter: Harlan Howard
- Producer: Owen Bradley

Jan Howard singles chronology
"You Don't Find a Good Man Everyday" (1965)	"Evil on Your Mind" (1966)	"Bad Seed" (1965)

"Evil on Your Mind" is a song written by Harlan Howard that was originally recorded by his wife (and American country artist) Jan Howard. Released as a single by Decca Records, the song made the US country top ten in 1966 and became one of six top ten singles in Jan Howard's career. The song received positive reception from publications following its release and was later nominated in 1967 by the Grammy Awards. It also served as the title track to her 1966 studio album Jan Howard Sings Evil on Your Mind.

== Background ==
The wife of country music songwriter Harlan Howard, Jan Howard was encouraged by her husband to have her own recording career. With her husband's help, her first material was released in 1959 and she had her first top 20 country single in 1960 with "The One You Slip Around With". After one charting record at the Capitol label, with her husband's help, she moved to Decca Records Her first Decca single titled "What Makes a Man Wander?" made the US country top 30 in 1965. Yet, her 1965 follow-up releases failed to gain traction and Howard was disappointed. Howard and her producer Owen Bradley waited to return to the studio until they found a better quality song, which would eventually be "Evil on Your Mind".

== Content and recording ==
Harlan Howard then composed "Evil on Your Mind", which told the story of a wife who suspects her husband of cheating after he persuades her to take a trip with her sister so he can engage in an affair. On her website, Howard recalled "having a good feeling about the song" after it was composed. Harlan then had his wife cut a demo of the song (along with four additional tracks) for Bradley to hear. In response, Bradley told Jan "that'a hit!". "Evil on Your Mind" was officially recorded with Bradley serving as the song's producer in 1966.

== Critical reception ==
"Evil on Your Mind" has since received a positive response from music magazines and writers. Billboard magazine predicted the song would make their country chart's top ten list and wrote, "Modern up-beat country production with clever lyric and fine vocal performance by Miss Howard." Cash Box also believed it to be a commercial success, writing that she would do "Top 50 business" with the track. The publication also wrote that the "side is a swinging, pop-flavored stanza". Addie Moore of the music website Wide Open Country named it among her "five definitive songs" and wrote that the track "struck that fine balance between helpless heartache and righteous anger." Writers Mary A. Bufwack and Robert K. Oermann wrote in their book, Finding Their Voice: The History of Women in Country Music, that the song was an example of Jan's "uptempo" and "feisty female" recordings that exemplified her sixties decade singles. Bill Friskics-Warren and David Cantwell named it among one of "500 greatest" country songs in their 2003 book Heartaches by the Number Country Music's 500 Greatest Singles.

== Release and chart performance ==
"Evil on Your Mind" was released as a single by Decca Records in April 1966. It was distributed by the label as a seven-inch vinyl single and included a B-side: Jan's self-composed track "Crying for Love". It made its debut on the US Billboard Hot Country Songs chart on April 23, 1966, and spent a total of 20 weeks there. The song rose to the number five position on July 2, ultimately becoming Jan's first top ten single in her career. It was one of two top ten solo singles in her career (her additional four top ten songs were duets with Bill Anderson) and her longest-running solo release on the country songs chart. It then served as the title track to Jan's second studio album titled Jan Howard Sings Evil on Your Mind (1966). Jan's performance of the song then received a nomination from the Grammy Awards in 1967, becoming one of two songs in her career to receive a nomination.

== Track listings ==
7" vinyl single

- "Evil on Your Mind" – 2:16
- "Crying for Love" – 2:23

== Charts ==
Weekly chart performance for "Evil on Your Mind"
Chart (1966)	Peak position
US Hot Country Songs (Billboard)	5

=== Year-end charts ===
Year-end chart performance for "Evil on Your Mind"
Chart (1966)	Position
US Hot Country Songs (Billboard)	58

== Accolades ==
Year	Nominee / work	Award	Result	Ref.
1967	9th Annual Grammy Awards	Best Country Vocal Performance, Female	Nominated	
