= The One You Slip Around With =

1959 single

Single by Jan Howard
- B-side: "I Wish I Could Fall in Love Again"
- Released: November 1959
- Genre: Country; Bakersfield Sound
- Length: 2:17
- Label: Challenge
- Songwriters: Harlan Howard; Fuzzy Owen
- Producer: Joe Johnson

Jan Howard singles chronology
| "Make an Honest Woman Out of Me" (1959) | "The One You Slip Around With" (1959) | "Wrong Company" (1960) |

"The One You Slip Around With" is a song originally written by Harlan Howard and Fuzzy Owen that was originally recorded by American country artist Jan Howard. The wife of Harlan Howard, the song became her first top 20 single on the US country songs chart. It received positive reviews from Billboard and Cash Box magazines following its release.

== Background, recording and content ==
Married to Nashville songwriter Harlan Howard, Jan Howard was encouraged by her husband to sing professionally and he helped her secure a recording contract in the late 1950s. A duet with Wynn Stewart was a success, leading to a solo release during the same period. Her producer Joe Johnson insisted on her recording "The One You Slip Around With" as her next single and she agreed to cut it. The story line of "The One You Slip Around With" was centered on a woman who discovers her spouse is cheating on her. It was composed by Harlan Howard and Fuzzy Owen, featuring production from Joe Johnson. Jan Howard recorded the song using her own voice to perform three-part harmony.

== Release, critical reception and chart performance ==
"The One You Slip Around With" was released by Challenge Records in November 1959. It was distributed as a seven-inch vinyl single and featured a B-side: "I Wish I Could Fall in Love Again". The song received positive reception from music publications following its release. This included Billboard magazine, which found Howard's performance to be "a fine rendition of a good tune, and it should register strongly with devotees of country music." Cash Box gave the song an "A" rating and wrote, "This could be the one the thrush will achieve national recognition with". In a separate Billboard publication dating from 1960, the magazine recommended the single to jukebox retailers. "The One You Slip Around With" made its debut on the US Billboard Hot Country Songs chart on January 11, 1960. Spending a total of 12 weeks there, it peaked at the number 13 position on February 29. The song became Howard's first top 20 entry on the chart and her first charting single as well.

== Track listing ==
7" vinyl single

- "The One You Slip Around With" – 2:17
- "I Wish I Could Fall in Love Again" – 2:15

== Charts ==
=== Weekly charts ===
Weekly chart performance for "The One You Slip Around With"
| Chart (1960) | Peak position |
|---|---|
| US Hot Country Songs (Billboard) | 13 |
