= List of Hot Country Singles number ones of 1967 =

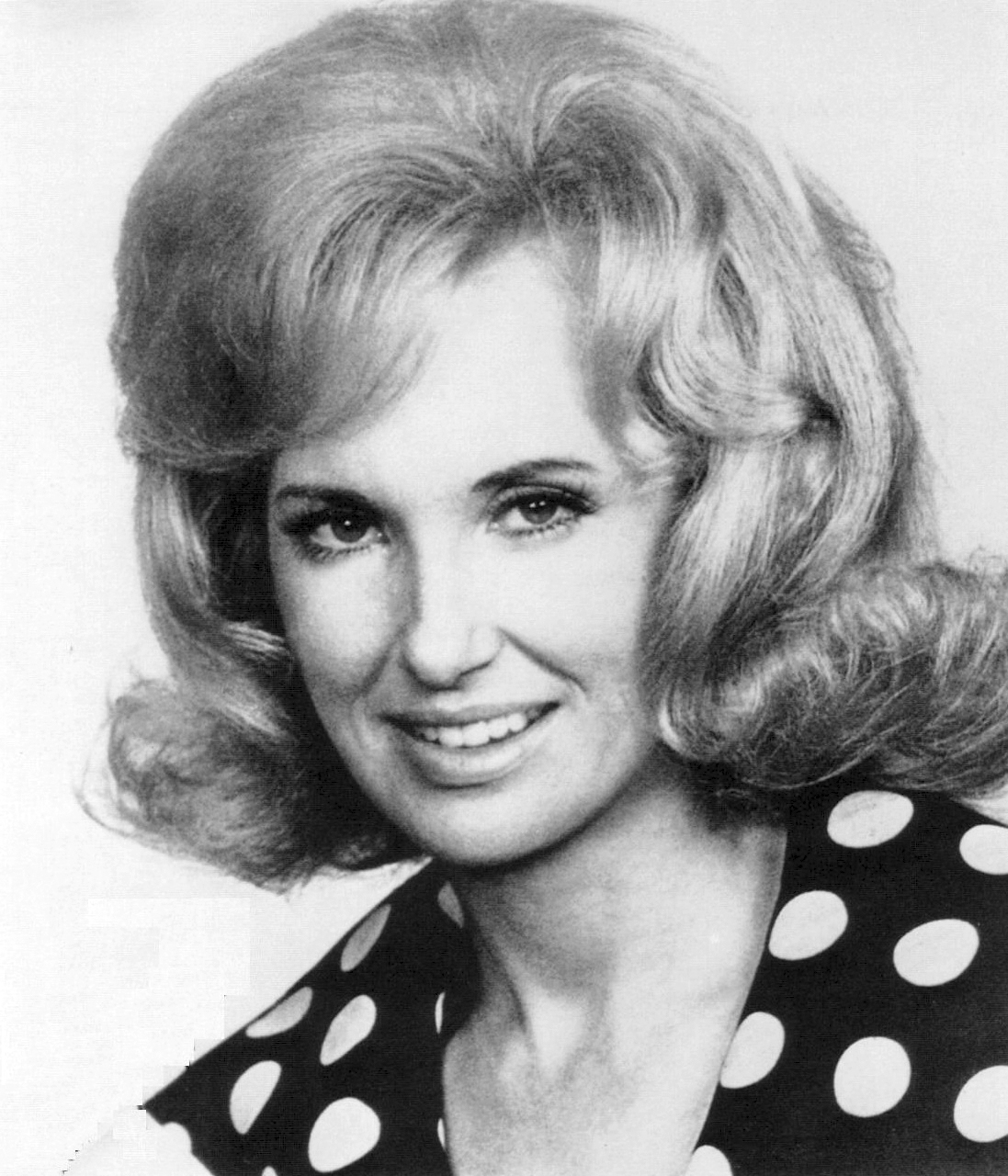
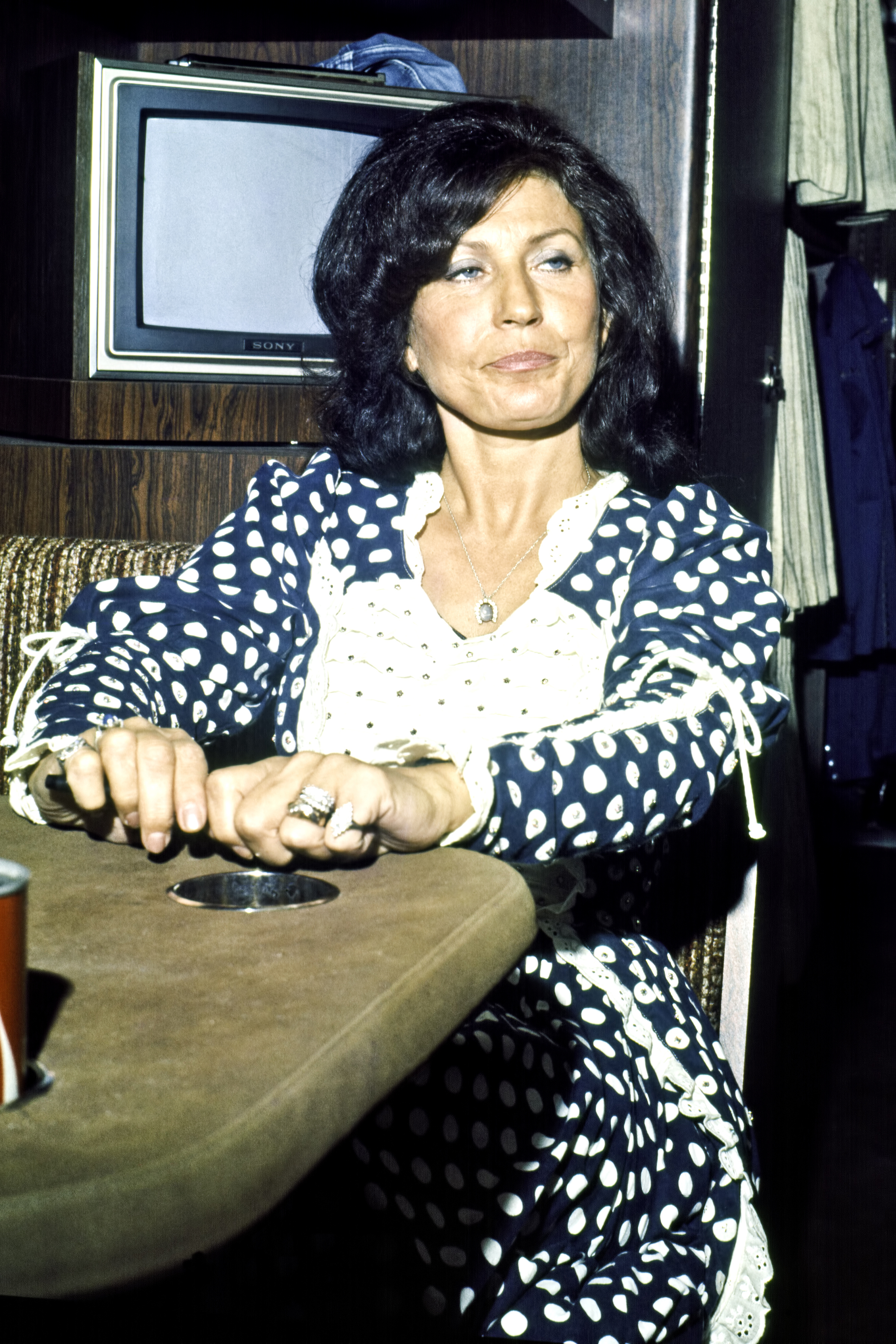
Two of country music's most successful female vocalists, Tammy Wynette (left) and Loretta Lynn, both reached number one for the first time in 1967.

Hot Country Songs is a chart that ranks the top-performing country music songs in the United States, published by Billboard magazine. In 1967, 23 different singles topped the chart, which was published at the time under the title Hot Country Singles, in 52 issues of the magazine. Chart placings were based on playlists submitted by country music radio stations and sales reports submitted by stores.

In the issue of Billboard dated January 7, the number one position was held by Jack Greene with "There Goes My Everything", the song's third week at number one. It remained at the top of the chart for the first five weeks of 1967 before it was replaced by Loretta Lynn's "Don't Come Home A' Drinkin' (With Lovin' On Your Mind)" in the issue dated February 11. The song marked the first appearance at number one for Lynn, whose career would ultimately span six decades and lead to her being regarded as one of the most influential artists in country music history. Another female vocalist who would go on to achieve a string of number one hits and be viewed as an all-time great of country music, Tammy Wynette, also reached number one for the first time in 1967. Wynette topped the chart for the first time when she collaborated with David Houston on the song "My Elusive Dreams", and returned to the top spot later in the year with the solo single "I Don't Wanna Play House". As a result of their lengthy and successful careers, both Lynn and Wynette would be dubbed the "first lady of country".

Three other artists reached number one for the first time in 1967, beginning with Wynn Stewart, who topped the chart for two weeks in June with "It's Such a Pretty World Today". Leon Ashley achieved his only number one when he spent a single week in the top spot in September with "Laura (What's He Got That I Ain't Got)"; his success was unusual in that his single was released on his own label, which he had set up to record, release and distribute his material after failing to find success elsewhere. Finally, Jan Howard ended the year at number one with her first chart-topper, "For Loving You", a duet with Bill Anderson. Sonny James spent the highest number of total weeks at number one in 1967, occupying the top spot for a total of eleven weeks with "Need You", "I'll Never Find Another You" and "It's the Little Things", one week more than Jack Greene spent at number one with "There Goes my Everything" and "All the Time". James was one of three artists who each took three different singles to number one in 1967. Buck Owens reached the top spot with "Where Does the Good Times Go", "Sam's Place" and "Your Tender Loving Care", which spent a combined total of eight weeks at number one. David Houston spent a total of five weeks in the peak position with "With One Exception", "You Mean the World to Me" and his duet with Tammy Wynette.

== Chart history ==
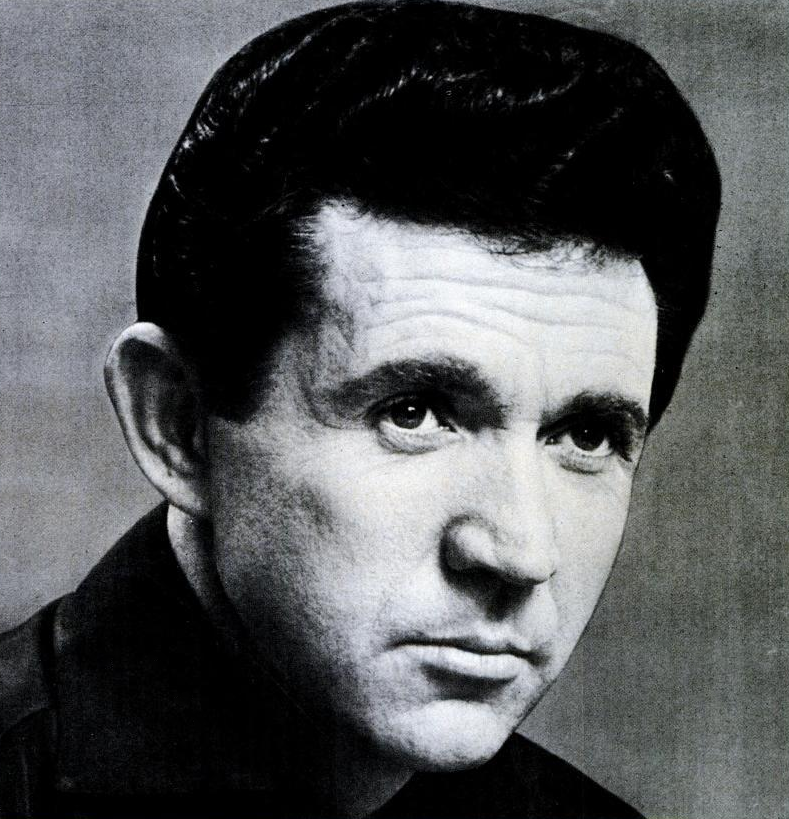
Sonny James spent the most weeks at number one of any artist in 1967.

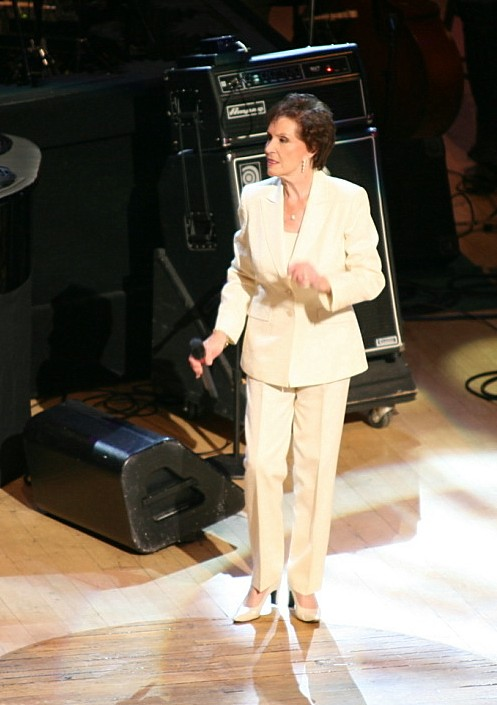
Jan Howard (pictured in 2007) ended the year at number one with "For Loving You", a duet with Bill Anderson.

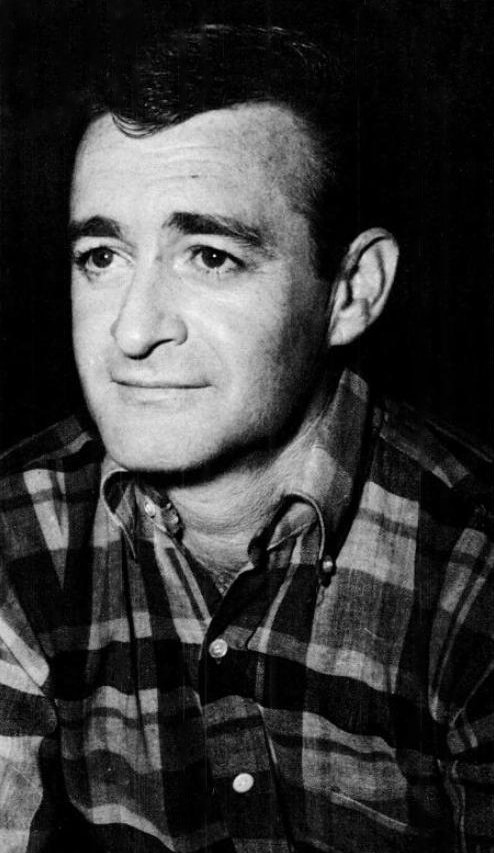
Wynn Stewart had his only chart-topper in 1967.

Hot Country Singles number ones of 1967
Issue date	Title	Artist(s)	Ref.
January 7	"There Goes My Everything"	Jack Greene	
January 14	"There Goes My Everything"	Jack Greene	
January 21	"There Goes My Everything"	Jack Greene	
January 28	"There Goes My Everything"	Jack Greene	
February 4	"There Goes My Everything"	Jack Greene	
February 11	"Don't Come Home A' Drinkin' (With Lovin' On Your Mind)"	Loretta Lynn	
February 18	"Where Does the Good Times Go"	Buck Owens	
February 25	"Where Does the Good Times Go"	Buck Owens	
March 4	"I'm A Lonesome Fugitive"	Merle Haggard	
March 11	"Where Does the Good Times Go"	Buck Owens	
March 18	"Where Does the Good Times Go"	Buck Owens	
March 25	"I Won't Come In While He's There"	Jim Reeves	
April 1	"Walk Through This World With Me"	George Jones	
April 8	"Walk Through This World With Me"	George Jones	
April 15	"Lonely Again"	Eddy Arnold	
April 22	"Lonely Again"	Eddy Arnold	
April 29	"Need You"	Sonny James	
May 6	"Need You"	Sonny James	
May 13	"Sam's Place"	Buck Owens	
May 20	"Sam's Place"	Buck Owens	
May 27	"Sam's Place"	Buck Owens	
June 3	"It's Such a Pretty World Today"	Wynn Stewart	
June 10	"It's Such a Pretty World Today"	Wynn Stewart	
June 17	"All The Time"	Jack Greene	
June 24	"All The Time"	Jack Greene	
July 1	"All The Time"	Jack Greene	
July 8	"All The Time"	Jack Greene	
July 15	"All The Time"	Jack Greene	
July 22	"With One Exception"	David Houston	
July 29	"Tonight Carmen"	Marty Robbins	
August 5	"I'll Never Find Another You"	Sonny James	
August 12	"I'll Never Find Another You"	Sonny James	
August 19	"I'll Never Find Another You"	Sonny James	
August 26	"I'll Never Find Another You"	Sonny James	
September 2	"Branded Man"	Merle Haggard	
September 9	"Your Tender Loving Care"	Buck Owens	
September 16	"My Elusive Dreams"	David Houston and Tammy Wynette	
September 23	"My Elusive Dreams"	David Houston and Tammy Wynette	
September 30	"Laura (What's He Got That I Ain't Got)"	Leon Ashley	
October 7	"Turn the World Around"	Eddy Arnold	
October 14	"I Don't Wanna Play House"	Tammy Wynette	
October 21	"I Don't Wanna Play House"	Tammy Wynette	
October 28	"I Don't Wanna Play House"	Tammy Wynette	
November 4	"You Mean the World to Me"	David Houston	
November 11	"You Mean the World to Me"	David Houston	
November 18	"It's the Little Things"	Sonny James	
November 25	"It's the Little Things"	Sonny James	
December 2	"It's the Little Things"	Sonny James	
December 9	"It's the Little Things"	Sonny James	
December 16	"It's the Little Things"	Sonny James	
December 23	"For Loving You"	Bill Anderson and Jan Howard	
December 30	"For Loving You"	Bill Anderson and Jan Howard	

== See also ==
- 1967 in music
- 1967 in country music
- List of artists who reached number one on the U.S. country chart
