= 1967 in country music =

This is a list of notable events in country music that took place in 1967.

== Events ==
- April 1 — The Country Music Hall of Fame and Museum opens in Nashville.
- September — Lynn Anderson becomes a featured vocalist on The Lawrence Welk Show; earlier in the year, she signs her first national recording contract with Chart Records.
- September 30 – Singer-songwriter Leon Ashley becomes the first performer in the genre to write, record, produce, release, distribute and publish a single that reaches No. 1 on the Billboard Hot Country Singles chart with "Laura (What's He Got That I Ain't Got)."
- October — The first Country Music Association Awards are handed out at Nashville's Municipal Auditorium. The show is not televised.

=== No dates ===
- For the first time in history, more than 20 No. 1 songs top the Billboard Hot Country Singles chart in a 52-week timespan. It will mark the start of a new trend in country music: a proliferation of No. 1 songs in a given year, a trend that – thanks to changes in radio programming Billboard data compilation – peaks in 1986 when there is a new No. 1 song every week.
- Dolly Parton joins Porter Wagoner's band, television series and road show. She and Wagoner record their first duets, releasing "The Last Thing on My Mind" (their first major hit together) late in the year. Parton will go on to become the first woman in country music to have top 10 hits in five different decades.
- The Browns disband when sisters Maxine and Bonnie leave the group. Jim Ed Brown begins the second phase of his long career – as a solo recording artist. The move pays off, as he immediately scores with "Pop a Top."

== Top hits of the year ==
=== Number one hits ===
==== United States ====
(as certified by Billboard)

Date	Single Name	Artist	Wks. No.1	CAN peak	Spec. Note
February 11	Don't Come Home A' Drinkin' (With Lovin' on Your Mind)	Loretta Lynn	1	—	^{[A]}
February 18	Where Does the Good Times Go	Buck Owens and the Buckaroos	4	—	^{[2]}: Returns to Number One March 11
March 4	The Fugitive	Merle Haggard and the Strangers	1	—
March 25	I Won't Come In While He's There	Jim Reeves	1	—	^{[B]}
April 1	Walk Through This World With Me	George Jones	2	—	Jones' first Billboard Number One since "She Thinks I Still Care" in 1962.
April 15	Lonely Again	Eddy Arnold	2	—
April 29	Need You	Sonny James	2	—
May 13	Sam's Place	Buck Owens and the Buckaroos	3	—
June 3	It's Such a Pretty World Today	Wynn Stewart	2	—	^{[C]}
June 17	All the Time	Jack Greene	4	—	^{[1]}
July 22	With One Exception	David Houston	1	—
July 29	Tonight Carmen	Marty Robbins	1	—
August 5	I'll Never Find Another You	Sonny James	4	—
September 2	Branded Man	Merle Haggard and the Strangers	1	—
September 9	Your Tender Loving Care	Buck Owens and the Buckaroos	1	—
September 16	My Elusive Dreams	David Houston and Tammy Wynette	2	—	^{[A] – Tammy Wynette}
September 30	Laura (What's He Got That I Ain't Got)	Leon Ashley	1	7	^{[C]}
October 7	Turn the World Around	Eddy Arnold	1	4
October 14	I Don't Wanna Play House	Tammy Wynette	3	3
November 4	You Mean the World to Me	David Houston	2
November 18	It's the Little Things	Sonny James	5	2
December 23	For Loving You	Bill Anderson and Jan Howard	4	9	^{[C] – Jan Howard}

Notes

- 1 No. 1 song of the year, as determined by Billboard.
- 2 Song dropped from No. 1 and later returned to top spot.
- A First Billboard No. 1 hit for that artist.
- B Last Billboard No. 1 hit for that artist.
- C Only Billboard No. 1 hit for that artist to date.

==== Canada ====
(as certified by RPM)

Date	Single Name	Artist	Wks. No.1	U.S. peak	Spec. Note
January 21	The Weatherman	Gary Buck	5	—
February 25	Whistling on the River	Mercey Brothers	7	—	^{[A], [2]}: Stayed at No. 1 for 6 weeks in December 1966 – January 1967.; Fell to #2 on the week of January 21, 1967.
March 4	Take This Heart of Mine	Odie Workman	2	—	^{[C]}
March 18	Whirlpool	Bambi Lynn	2	—	^{[C]}
April 1	Ten Foot Pole	Johnny Ellis	3	—	^{[C]}
April 22	Irena Cheyenne	Jimmy Arthur Ordge	3	—	^{[A]}
May 13	Uncle Tom	Mercey Brothers	6	—	^{[2]}: Fell to #2 on the week of June 3, 1967.
June 3	I Can't Even Do Wrong Right	Johnny Burke	2	—	^{[C]}
July 8	It's Just About Over	Johnny Clark	3	—	^{[C]}
July 29	The Alcan Run	Bud Roberts	2	—	^{[C]}
August 12	I Got What I Wanted	The Rainvilles	3	—	^{[C]}
September 2	Take the Bad with the Good	Lynn Jones	1	—	^{[A]}
September 9	The Sound That Makes Me Blue	Dianne Leigh	4	—
October 7	Human Nature	Orval Prophet	2	—	^{[A]}
October 21	Too Far Gone	Lucille Starr	3	72	^{[A]}
November 11	You Mean the World to Me	David Houston	3		^{[A]}
December 2	Gardenias in Her Hair	Marty Robbins	1	9	^{[A]}
December 9	Deep Water	Carl Smith	1	10	^{[C]}
December 16	Mary in the Morning	Tommy Hunter	2	66	^{[C]}
December 30	It Takes People Like You (To Make People Like Me)	Buck Owens	2	2

Notes

- 2 Song dropped from No. 1 and later returned to top spot.
- A First RPM No. 1 hit for that artist.
- C Only RPM No. 1 hit for that artist.

=== Other major hits ===
==== Singles released by American artists ====
US	CAN	Single	Artist
10	—	Anything Your Heart Desires	Billy Walker
27	20	The Ballad of Water Hole #3	Roger Miller
3	—	Bear with Me a Little Longer	Billy Walker
14	—	Bob	The Willis Brothers
13	4	Bottle, Bottle	Jim Ed Brown
6	—	Break My Mind	George Hamilton IV
5	—	Burning a Hole in My Mind	Connie Smith
18	—	Burning Bridges	Glen Campbell
20	—	California Up Tight Band	Flatt & Scruggs
9	—	'Cause I Have You	Wynn Stewart
16	—	Charleston Railroad Tavern	Bobby Bare
8	4	The Chokin' Kind	Waylon Jennings
4	—	Cincinnati, Ohio	Connie Smith
2	—	The Cold Hard Facts of Life	Porter Wagoner
14	—	Come Kiss Me Love	Bobby Bare
9	—	Danny Boy	Ray Price
18	—	Diesel on My Tail	Jim & Jesse
12	—	A Dime at a Time	Del Reeves
4	3	Does My Ring Hurt Your Finger	Charley Pride
8	—	Don't Squeeze My Sharmon	Charlie Walker
8	—	Drifting Apart	Warner Mack
6	5	Fool Fool Fool	Webb Pierce
11	—	Fuel to the Flame	Skeeter Davis
8	—	Funny, Familiar, Forgotten Feelings	Don Gibson
5	—	Get While the Gettin's Good	Bill Anderson
20	—	Goodbye Wheeling	Mel Tillis
11	—	Green River	Waylon Jennings
7	—	Happy Tracks	Kenny Price
16	—	He's Got a Way with Women	Hank Thompson
12	—	Heart, We Did All We Could	Jean Shepard
12	—	How Fast Them Trucks Can Go	Claude Gray
4	—	How Long Will It Take	Warner Mack
3	—	Hurt Her Once for Me	The Wilburn Brothers
5	—	I Can't Get There from Here	George Jones
17	—	I Didn't Jump the Fence	Red Sovine
6	—	I Know One	Charley Pride
9	—	I Never Had the One I Wanted	Claude Gray
11	19	I Taught Her Everything She Knows	Billy Walker
2	—	I Threw Away the Rose	Merle Haggard
10	—	I'll Come Runnin'	Connie Smith
6	16	I'm Still Not Over You	Ray Price
5	—	If I Kiss You (Will You Go Away)	Lynn Anderson
7	—	If My Heart Had Windows	George Jones
12	—	If the Whole World Stopped Lovin'	Roy Drusky
7	—	If You're Not Gone Too Long	Loretta Lynn
18	—	In Del Rio	Billy Walker
2	—	Jackson	Johnny Cash and June Carter
13	—	Juanita Jones	Stu Phillips
15	—	Jukebox Charlie	Johnny Paycheck
15	—	Julie	Porter Wagoner
9	—	Just Between You and Me	Charley Pride
13	—	Just Beyond the Moon	Tex Ritter
11	—	Life Turned Her That Way	Mel Tillis
13	—	Like a Fool	Dottie West
9	—	Little Old Wine Drinker Me	Robert Mitchum
6	—	Long-Legged Guitar Pickin' Man	Johnny Cash and June Carter
3	—	A Loser's Cathedral	David Houston
12	—	Love Me and Make It All Better	Bobby Lewis
48	14	Mabel (You Have Been a Friend to Me)	Billy Grammer
5	—	Mama Spank	Liz Anderson
12	—	Mental Revenge	Waylon Jennings
3	—	Misty Blue	Eddy Arnold
13	—	Motel Time Again	Johnny Paycheck
16	—	Mr. Shorty	Marty Robbins
12	—	My Kind of Love	Dave Dudley
10	—	No One's Gonna Hurt You Anymore	Bill Anderson
16	—	No Tears Milady	Marty Robbins
17	—	Ode to Billie Joe	Bobbie Gentry
17	—	Oh! Woman	Nat Stuckey
4	—	Once	Ferlin Husky
8	—	Paper Mansions	Dottie West
9	—	Phantom 309	Red Sovine
15	—	The Piney Wood Hills	Bobby Bare
3	—	Pop a Top	Jim Ed Brown
15	—	Promises and Hearts (Were Made to Break)	Stonewall Jackson
13	—	Roarin' Again	The Wilburn Brothers
9	—	Ruby, Don't Take Your Love to Town	Johnny Darrell
10	—	Ruthless	The Statler Brothers
16	—	Sneaking 'Cross the Border	The Harden Trio
17	—	Something Fishy	Dolly Parton
5	—	Stamp Out Loneliness	Stonewall Jackson
16	—	The Storm	Jim Reeves
16	—	Sweet Misery	Jimmy Dean
16	—	Tear Time	Wilma Burgess
11	—	Tears Will Be the Chaser for Your Wine	Wanda Jackson
7	—	Urge for Going	George Hamilton IV
7	—	Walkin' in the Sunshine	Roger Miller
13	—	A Wanderin' Man	Jeannie Seely
5	—	What Does It Take (To Keep a Man Like You Satisfied)	Skeeter Davis
5	6	What Kind of a Girl (Do You Think I Am)	Loretta Lynn
2	8	What Locks the Door	Jack Greene
17	—	What's Come Over My Baby	Dottie West
14	—	Where Could I Go (But to Her)	David Houston
4	13	A Woman in Love	Bonnie Guitar
10	—	The Words I'm Gonna Have to Eat	Bill Phillips
20	—	You Beat All I Ever Saw	Johnny Cash
18	—	You Can Have Her	Jim Ed Brown
10	—	You Can't Have Your Kate and Edith, Too	The Statler Brothers
14	—	You Pushed Me Too Far	Ferlin Husky
26	2	You've Been So Good to Me	Van Trevor
17	—	Your Forevers (Don't Last Very Long)	Jean Shepard
3	—	Your Good Girl's Gonna Go Bad	Tammy Wynette

==== Singles released by Canadian artists ====
US	CAN	Single	Artist
—	3	The Battle of the Little Big Horn	Tommy Hunter
—	5	Blue Is the Colour	Billy Stoltz
—	5	Build a Scaffold Way Up High	Doug Lycett
—	2	Chew Tobacco Road	Irwin Prescott
—	2	Cup of Disgrace	Tommy Hunter
—	5	Don't Speak to Me of Loneliness	Dougie Trineer
18	—	Down at the Pawn Shop	Hank Snow
—	5	The Fool	Dick Nolan
—	7	The Homecoming	Ralph Carlson
—	3	I Did It	The Whippoorwills
—	3	The Johnson Family	Ralph Carlson
20	15	Learnin' a New Way of Life	Hank Snow
—	4	Leave Me a Memory	Johnny Ellis
—	10	Lone Star Rag	Frankie Rodgers
—	4	Love's Gonna Come Back	Gary Buck
—	2	Loving Day	Johnny Burke
—	2	Model “T”	Irwin Prescott
—	6	Transport Blues	Ralph Carlson
—	6	Walkin' with the Blues	Billy Stoltz
—	3	Why Can't He Be You	Dianne Leigh
—	4	Why Did You Hurt Me	Merv Smith
—	6	You're the Least of My Worries	Hugh Scott
—	5	Your Special Day	Myrna Lorrie

== Top new album releases ==
Album	Artist	Record Label
12 Greatest Hits	Patsy Cline	Decca
Bill Anderson's Greatest Hits	Bill Anderson	Decca
Branded Man	Merle Haggard	Capitol
Carryin' On with Johnny Cash & June Carter	Johnny Cash and June Carter	Columbia
Get While the Gettin's Good	Bill Anderson	Decca
Greatest Hits Vol. 1	Johnny Cash	Columbia
Heart, We Did All That We Could	Jean Shepard	Capitol
Hello, I'm Dolly	Dolly Parton	Monument
It's Such a Pretty World Today	Wynn Stewart	Capitol
Just Between You And Me	Porter Wagoner and Dolly Parton	RCA
Love of the Common People	Waylon Jennings	RCA
The One and Only	Waylon Jennings	RCA
Promises, Promises	Lynn Anderson	Chart
This Is Jan Howard Country	Jan Howard	Decca
Waylon Sings Ol' Harlan	Waylon Jennings	RCA

=== Other top albums ===
Album	Artist	Record Label
Blue Side of Lonesome	Jim Reeves	RCA
By the Time I Get to Phoenix	Glen Campbell	Capitol
The Cold Hard Facts of Life	Porter Wagoner	RCA
Cookin' Up Hits	Liz Anderson	RCA
The Country Way	Charley Pride	RCA
Walk Through This World with Me	George Jones	Musicor
Don't Come Home a Drinkin' (With Lovin' on Your Mind)	Loretta Lynn	Decca
Dottie West Sings Sacred Ballads	Dottie West	RCA
The Game of Triangles	Bobby Bare and Liz Anderson	RCA
Gentle on My Mind	Glen Campbell	Capitol
Hand In Hand With Jesus	Skeeter Davis	RCA
I Can Do Nothing Alone	Bill Anderson	Decca
I'll Help You Forget Her	Dottie West	RCA
Jackson Ain't a Very Big Town	Norma Jean	RCA
Lonely Again	Eddy Arnold	RCA
Love's Gonna Happen to Me	Wynn Stewart	Capitol
My Elusive Dreams	Tammy Wynette	Epic
Nashville Women	Hank Locklin	RCA
Norma Jean Sings Porter Wagoner	Norma Jean	RCA
Please Don't Squeeze My Charmin	Charlie Walker	Epic
The Pride of Country Music	Charley Pride	RCA
Queen Of Honky Tonk Street	Kitty Wells	Decca
Reckless Love Affair	Wanda Jackson	Capitol
Ride, Ride, Ride	Lynn Anderson	Chart
Skeeter Sings Buddy Holly	Skeeter Davis	RCA
Soul of a Convict	Porter Wagoner	RCA
Thanks, Hank!	Jeannie Seely	Monument
Turn the World Around	Eddy Arnold	RCA
With All My Heart and Soul	Dottie West	RCA
You'll Always Have My Love	Wanda Jackson and The Party Timers	Capitol
Your Forevers Don't Last Very Long	Jean Shepard	Capitol
Your Good Girl's Gonna Go Bad	Tammy Wynette	Epic

== Births ==
- February 6 — Anita Cochran, vocalist best known for 1998 hit "What If I Said"
- February 22 — Greg Holland, singer since the 1990s.
- April 5 — Troy Gentry, one half of Montgomery Gentry (d. 2017)
- May 1 — Tim McGraw, singer and actor active since the 1990s, also known for marriage to Faith Hill.
- September 21 — Faith Hill, singer known for her multi-genre success since the 1990s, and marriage to Tim McGraw.
- October 26 — Keith Urban, Australian-born singer who began enjoying great success in the United States since 2000.
- December 5 — Gary Allan, Bakersfield-styled singer-songwriter since the 1990s.
- December 26 — Audrey Wiggins, sister of John Wiggins, since the 1990s.

== Deaths ==
- January 1 — Moon Mullican, 57, known as the "King of the Hillbilly Piano Players", also widely known today for his hit "I'll Sail My Ship Alone" (heart attack).

== Country Music Hall of Fame Inductees ==
- Red Foley (1910–1968)
- J. L. Frank (1900–1952)
- Jim Reeves (1923–1964)
- Stephen H. Sholes (1911–1968)

== Major awards ==
=== Grammy Awards ===
- Best Country and Western Solo Vocal Performance, Female — "I Don't Wanna Play House", Tammy Wynette
- Best Country and Western Solo Vocal Performance, Male — "Gentle on My Mind", Glen Campbell
- Best Country and Western Performance, Duet, Trio or Group (Vocal or Instrumental) — "Jackson," Johnny Cash and June Carter
- Best Country and Western Recording — "Gentle on My Mind", Al De Lory (Performer: Glen Campbell)
- Best Country and Western Song — "Gentle on My Mind", John Hartford (Performer: Glen Campbell)

=== Academy of Country Music ===
- Album of the Year — Gentle on My Mind, Glen Campbell
- Top Male Vocalist — Glen Campbell
- Top Female Vocalist — Lynn Anderson
- Top Vocal Duo — Merle Haggard and Bonnie Owens
- Top Vocal Group — Sons of the Pioneers
- Top New Male Vocalist — Jerry Inman
- Top New Female Vocalist — Bobbie Gentry

=== Country Music Association ===
- Founding President's Award (formerly Connie B. Gay Award) — Gene Nash, Leroy Van Dyke
- Entertainer of the Year — Eddy Arnold
- Song of the Year — "There Goes My Everything", Dallas Frazier (Performer: Jack Greene)
- Single of the Year — "There Goes My Everything", Jack Greene
- Album of the Year — There Goes My Everything, Jack Greene
- Male Vocalist of the Year — Jack Greene
- Female Vocalist of the Year — Loretta Lynn
- Vocal Group of the Year — The Stoneman Family
- Instrumentalist of the Year — Chet Atkins
- Instrumental Group of the Year — The Buckaroos
- Comedian of the Year — Don Bowman

== See also ==
- Country Music Association
- Inductees of the Country Music Hall of Fame
