= Billboard Top Country Singles of 1967 =

List of popular songs

This is a list of Billboard magazine's ranking of the top country singles of 1967. "All the Time" by Jack Greene ranked as the year's No. 1 country single.

The ranking was based on performance on the Billboard country charts during the first eight months of 1967. Accordingly, the list excludes songs like Tammy Wynette's "I Don't Wanna Play House" and Sonny James' "It's the Little Things", which reached No. 1 later in the year.

Rank	Peak (Note: This column recites the record's peak position on Billboard's weekly charts.)	Title	Artist(s)	Label
1	1	"All the Time"	Jack Greene	Decca
2	1	"Walk Through This World With Me"	George Jones	Musicor
3	1	"It's Such a Pretty World Today"	Wynn Stewart	Capitol
4	1	"Where Does the Good Times Go"	Buck Owens	Capitol
5	3	"Your Good Girl's Gonna Go Bad"	Tammy Wynette	Epic
6	1	"There Goes My Everything"	Jack Greene	Decca
7	1	"Need You"	Sonny James	Capitol
8	1	"Sam's Place"	Buck Owens	Capitol
9	1	"With One Exception"	David Houston	Epic
10	1	"Lonely Again"	Eddy Arnold	RCA Victor
11	2	"The Cold Hard Facts of Life"	Porter Wagoner	RCA Victor
12	5	"If I Kiss You (Will You Go Away)"	Lynn Anderson	Chart
13	1	"I'll Never Find Another You"	Sonny James	Capitol
14	5	"Get While the Gettin's Good"	Bill Anderson	Decca
15	1	"I'm A Lonesome Fugitive"	Merle Haggard	Capitol
16	2	"I Threw Away the Rose"	Merle Haggard	Capitol
17	1	"I Won't Come In While He's There"	Jim Reeves	RCA Victor
18	7	"Urge for Going"	George Hamilton IV	RCA Victor
19	3	"Misty Blue"	Eddy Arnold	RCA Victor
20		"I Know Me"	Charley Pride	RCA Victor
21	5	"Stamp Out Loneliness"	Stonewall Jackson	RCA Victor
22	5	"Mama Spank"	Liz Anderson	RCA Victor
23	9	"Danny Boy"	Ray Price	Columbia
24	7	"If You're Not Gone Too Long"	Loretta Lynn	Decca
25	11	"Life Turned Her That Way"	Mel Tillis	Kapp
26	8	"Drifting Apart"	Warner Mack	Decca
27	3	"A Loser's Cathedral"	David Houston	Epic
28	2	"Jackson"	Johnny Cash and June Carter	Columbia
29	1	"Tonight Carmen"	Marty Robbins	Columbia
30	1	"Don't Come Home A' Drinkin' (With Lovin' on Your Mind)"	Loretta Lynn	Decca
31	7	"Happy Tracks"	Kenny Price	Boone
32	3	"Pop a Top"	Jim Ed Brown	RCA Victor
33	8	"Paper Mansions"	Dottie West	RCA Victor
34	5	"I Can't Get There from Here"	George Jones	Musicor
35	9	"Just Between You and Me"	Charley Pride	RCA Victor
36	4	"Once"	Ferlin Husky	Capitol
37	10	"I'll Come Runnin'"	Connie Smith	RCA Victor
38	7	"Walkin' in the Sunshine"	Roger Miller	Smash
39	11	"Tears Will Be the Chaser for Your Wine"	Wanda Jackson	Capitol
40	9	"Ruby, Don't Take Your Love to Town"	Johnny Darrell	United Artists
41	11	"Fuel to the Flame"	Skeeter Davis	RCA Victor
42	3	"Hurt Her Once for Me"	The Wilburn Brothers	Decca
43	9	"I Never Had the One I Wanted"	Claude Gray	Decca
44	10	"Ruthless"	The Statler Brothers	Columbia
45	10	"Anything Your Heart Desires"	Billy Walker	Monument
46	12	"My Kind of Love"	Dave Dudley	Mercury
47	12	"Mental Revenge"	Waylon Jennings	RCA Victor
48	13	"Just Beyond the Moon"	Tex Ritter	Capitol
49	14	"Bob"	The Willis Brothers	Starday
50	9	"Little Old Wine Drinker Me"	Robert Mitchum	Monument

== See also ==
- List of Hot Country Singles number ones of 1967
- List of Billboard Hot 100 number ones of 1967
- 1968 in country music
