= Sonny James discography =

- Studio albums: 37
- Live albums: 2
- Compilation albums: 13
- Tribute albums: 2
- Singles: 103
- B-sides: 2
- No. 1 Singles (USA): 24

The article presents a discography for American country artist Sonny James.

== Studio albums ==
=== 1950s ===
Title	Album details
The Southern Gentleman	Release date: 1957; Label: Capitol Records
Sonny	Release date: September 1957; Label: Capitol Records
Honey	Release date: 1958; Label: Capitol Records
The Sonny Side	Release date: 1959; Label: Capitol Records

=== 1960s ===
Title	Album details	Peak chart positions	
Title	Album details	US Country	US
Young Love	Release date: 1962; Label: Dot Records	1	2
The Minute You're Gone	Release date: November 1963; Label: Capitol Records	—	—
You're the Only World I Know	Release date: November 1964; Label: Capitol Records	2	—
I'll Keep Holding On (Just to Your Love)	Release date: March 1965; Label: Capitol Records	2	—
Behind the Tear	Release date: October 1965; Label: Capitol Records	2	—
True Love's a Blessing	Release date: October 1965; Label: Capitol Records	3	—
Till the Last Leaf Shall Fall	Release date: July 1966; Label: Capitol Records	6	—
Need You	Release date: April 1967; Label: Capitol Records	1	—
I'll Never Find Another You	Release date: August 1967; Label: Capitol Records	6	—
A World of Our Own	Release date: 1967; Label: Capitol Records	8	—
Heaven Says Hello	Release date: June 1968; Label: Capitol Records	16	—
Born to Be with You	Release date: 1968; Label: Capitol Records	2	—
Only the Lonely	Release date: 1969; Label: Capitol Records	4	161
"—" denotes releases that did not chart

=== 1970s and 1980s ===
Title	Album details	Peak chart positions	
Title	Album details	US Country	US
It's Just a Matter of Time	Release date: 1970; Label: Capitol Records	4	177
My Love/Don't Keep Me Hangin' On	Release date: July 1970; Label: Capitol Records	8	197
#1 Biggest Hits in Country Music	Release date: 1970; Label: Capitol Records	6	187
Empty Arms	Release date: 1971; Label: Capitol Records	9	150
The Sensational Sonny James	Release date: 1971; Label: Capitol Records	6	197
Here Comes Honey Again	Release date: 1971; Label: Capitol Records	16	—
That's Why I Love You Like I Do	Release date: 1972; Label: Capitol Records	5	—
When the Snow Is on the Roses	Release date: 1972; Label: Columbia Records	4	190
The Greatest Country Hits of '72	Release date: 1973; Label: Columbia Records	12	—
If She Helps Me Get Over You	Release date: 1973; Label: Columbia Records	17	—
Is It Wrong	Release date: 1974; Label: Columbia Records	22	—
Mis Esposa Con Amor (To My Wife with Love)	Release date: 1974; Label: Columbia Records	27	—
A Little Bit South of Saskatoon/ Little Band of Gold	Release date: 1975; Label: Columbia Records	29	—
The Guitars of Sonny James	Release date: 1975; Label: Columbia Records	41	—
Country Male Artist of the Decade	Release date: 1975; Label: Columbia Records	31	—
200 Years of Country Music	Release date: 1976; Label: Columbia Records	6	—
When Something Is Wrong with My Baby	Release date: 1976; Label: Columbia Records	26	—
You're Free to Go	Release date: 1977; Label: Columbia Records	25	—
This Is the Love	Release date: 1978; Label: Columbia Records	—	—
Sunny Side Up	Release date: 1979; Label: Monument Records	—	—
I'm Looking Over the Rainbow	Release date: 1982; Label: Dimension Records	—	—
"—" denotes releases that did not chart

== Christmas albums ==
Title	Album details	Peak positions
Title	Album details	US
My Christmas Dream	Release date: 1966; Label: Capitol Records	73

== Live albums ==
Title	Album details	Peak chart positions	
Title	Album details	US Country	US
The Astrodome Presents in Person Sonny James	Release date: 1969; Label: Capitol Records	4	83
In Prison, In Person	Release date: 1977; Label: Columbia Records	25	—
"—" denotes releases that did not chart

== Compilation albums ==
Title	Album details	Peak chart positions	
Title	Album details	US Country	US
The Best of Sonny James	Release date: November 1966; Label: Capitol Records	1	141
The Best of Sonny James, Vol. 2	Release date: 1969; Label: Capitol Records	26	—
Sonny James Close Up	Release date: 1969; Label: Capitol Records	38	184
Biggest Hits	Release date: 1971; Label: Capitol Records	7	—
Traces	Release date: 1972; Label: Capitol Records	21	—
The Gentleman from the South	Release date: 1973; Label: Capitol Records	41	—
Young Love	Release date: 1973; Label: Capitol Records	50	—
Hit Sounds	Release date: 1973; Label: Capitol Records	—	—
Greatest Hits	Release date: 1978; Label: Columbia Records	—	—
Sonny James	Release date: 1986; Label: Dot/MCA Records	—	—
American Originals	Release date: 1989; Label: Columbia Records	—	—
Capitol Collector's Series	Release date: 1990; Label: Capitol Records	—	—
The Best of Sonny James	Release date: 1991; Label: Curb Records	—	—
"—" denotes releases that did not chart

== Singles ==
=== 1950s ===
Year	Single	Peak chart positions				Album
Year	Single	US Country	US Cash Box Country	US	UK	Album
1952	"Short Cut"	—	—	—	—	non-album singles
1952	"That's Me Without You"	9	—	—	—	non-album singles
1953	"Somebody Else's Heartache"	—	—	—	—	non-album singles
1953	"Poor Boy Rich Lovin'"	—	—	—	—	non-album singles
1953	"My Greatest Thrill"	—	—	—	—	non-album singles
1954	"That's How I Need You"	—	—	—	—	non-album singles
1954	"The People Next to Me"	—	—	—	—	non-album singles
1954	"She Done Give Her Heart to Me"	14	—	—	—	non-album singles
1954	"I Forgot to Remember Santa Claus"	—	—	—	—	non-album singles
1955	"Lovin' Season"	—	—	—	—	non-album singles
1955	"Ain't Gonna Take No Chance"	—	—	—	—	non-album singles
1955	"Till the Last Leaf Shall Fall"	—	—	—	—	Till the Last Leaf Shall Fall
1955	"Let's Go Bunny Huggin'"	—	—	—	—	non-album singles
1955	"Pigtails and Ribbons"	—	—	—	—	non-album singles
1956	"For Rent (One Empty Heart)"	7	10	—	—	The Best of Sonny James
1956	"Twenty Feet of Muddy Water"	11	15	—	—	The Minute You're Gone
1956	"The Cat Came Back"	12	—	—	30	You're the Only World I Know
1956	"Young Love"	1	1	1	11	The Sonny Side
1957	"First Date, First Kiss, First Love"	9	10	25	—	The Sonny Side
1957	"Lovesick Blues"	15	13	—	—	The Sonny Side
1957	"A Mighty Lovable Man"	—	—	—	—	The Sonny Side
1957	"Uh-Huh-mm"	8	9	92	—	The Sonny Side
1958	"Kathleen"	—	30	—	—	The Sonny Side
1958	"Are You Mine"	—	—	—	—	The Sonny Side
1958	"You Got That Touch"	—	—	94	—	non-album singles
1958	"Let Me Be the One to Love You"	—	—	—	—	non-album singles
1959	"Dream Big"	—	—	—	—	non-album singles
1959	"Talk of the School"	—	—	85	—	non-album singles
1959	"Pure Love"	—	—	107	—	non-album singles
1959	"Who's Next in Line"	—	—	—	—	non-album singles
1959	"I Forgot More Than You'll Ever Know"	—	—	80	—	Sonny
"—" denotes releases that did not chart

=== 1960s ===
Year	Single	Peak chart positions					Album
Year	Single	US Country	US Cash Box Country	US	CAN Country	CAN	Album
1960	"Jenny Lou"	22	18	67	—	—	non-album singles
1960	"Wondering"	—	—	—	—	—	non-album singles
1960	"I Wish This Night Would Never End / Bimbo"	—	—	—	—	—	non-album singles
1961	"Apache"	—	—	87	—	—	non-album singles
1961	"Innocent Angel"	—	—	—	—	—	non-album singles
1961	"Young Love" (re-recording)	—	—	—	—	—	non-album singles
1962	"(The Legend Of) Brown Mountain Light"	—	28	—	—	—	non-album singles
1962	"A Mile And A Quarter"	—	44	—	—	—	non-album singles
1962	"On the Longest Day"	—	—	—	—	—	non-album singles
1963	"The Minute You're Gone"	9	8	95	—	—	The Minute You're Gone
1963	"Going Through the Motions (Of Living)"	17	10	—	—	—	The Minute You're Gone
1964	"Baltimore"	6	7	134	—	—	You're the Only World I Know
1964	"Sugar Lump" /	27	—	—	—	—	You're the Only World I Know
1964	"Ask Marie"	—	10	—	—	—	You're the Only World I Know
1964	"You're the Only World I Know"	1	1	91	—	—	You're the Only World I Know
1965	"I'll Keep Holding On (Just to Your Love)"	2	3	116	—	—	I'll Keep Holding On (Just to Your Love)
1965	"Behind the Tear"	1	2	113	—	—	Behind the Tear
1965	"True Love's a Blessing"	3	2	—	—	—	True Love's a Blessing
1966	"Take Good Care of Her"	1	1	—	—	—	True Love's a Blessing
1966	"Room in Your Heart"	2	1	—	—	—	The Best of Sonny James
1966	"Barefoot Santa Claus"	—	—	—	—	—	My Christmas Dream
1967	"Need You"	1	1	—	—	—	Need You
1967	"I'll Never Find Another You"	1	1	97	—	—	I'll Never Find Another You
1967	"It's the Little Things"	1	1	—	2	—	Behind the Tear
1968	"A World of Our Own"	1	1	118	1	—	A World of Our Own
1968	"Heaven Says Hello"	1	1	—	26	—	Heaven Says Hello
1968	"Born to Be with You"	1	1	81	9	—	Born to Be with You
1969	"Only the Lonely"	1	1	92	1	93	Only the Lonely
1969	"Running Bear"	1	1	94	1	74	The Astrodome Presents in Person
1969	"Since I Met You Baby"^{[A]}	1	1	65	3	79	The Astrodome Presents in Person
1969	"It's Just a Matter of Time"	1	1	87	4	85	It's Just a Matter of Time
"—" denotes releases that did not chart

=== 1970s ===
Year	Single	Peak chart positions			Album
Year	Single	US Country	US	CAN Country	Album
1970	"My Love"	1	125	3	My Love/Don't Keep Me Hangin' On
1970	"Don't Keep Me Hangin' On"	1	—	17	My Love/Don't Keep Me Hangin' On
1970	"Endlessly"	1	108	10	Empty Arms
1971	"Empty Arms"	1	93	1	Empty Arms
1971	"Bright Lights, Big City"	1	91	4	The Sensational Sonny James
1971	"Here Comes Honey Again"	1	—	4	Here Comes Honey Again
1971	"Only Love Can Break a Heart"	2	—	2	Biggest Hits
1972	"That's Why I Love You Like I Do"	1	—	1	That's Why I Love You Like I Do
1972	"When the Snow Is on the Roses"	1	103	1	When the Snow Is on the Roses
1972	"Traces"	30	—	42	Traces
1972	"White Silver Sands"	5	—	2	When the Snow Is on the Roses
1972	"Downfall of Me"	32	—	48	That's Why I Love You Like I Do
1973	"I Love You More and More Everyday"	4	—	3	If She Helps Me Get Over You
1973	"Reach Out Your Hand and Touch Me"	61	—	71	Empty Arms
1973	"If She Just Helps Me Get Over You"	15	—	11	If She Helps Me Get Over You
1973	"Heaven on Earth"	66	—	58	The Sensational Sonny James
1973	"Surprise, Surprise"	49	—	67	Here Comes Honey Again
1974	"Is It Wrong (For Loving You)"	1	—	75	Is It Wrong
1974	"A Mi Esposa Con Amor (To My Wife with Love)"	4	—	3	A Mi Esposa Con Amor (To My Wife with Love)
1974	"All the Way Together"	—	—	—	That's Why I Love You Like I Do
1975	"A Little Bit South of Saskatoon"	6	—	9	A Little Bit South of Saskatoon/ Little Band of Gold
1975	"Little Band of Gold"	5	—	4	A Little Bit South of Saskatoon/ Little Band of Gold
1975	"Maria Elena"	—	—	—	The Guitars of Sonny James
1975	"What in the World's Come Over You"	10	—	3	Country Male Artist of the Decade
1975	"Eres Tu (Touch the Wind)"	67	—	—	The Guitars of Sonny James
1976	"Prisoner's Song"	14	—	3	200 Years of Country Music
1976	"When Something Is Wrong with My Baby"	6	—	5	When Something Is Wrong with My Baby
1976	"Come On In"	8	—	10	Greatest Hits
1977	"You're Free to Go"	9	—	21	You're Free to Go
1977	"In the Jailhouse Now" (with His Tennessee State Prison Band)	15	—	30	In Prison In Person
1977	"Abilene" (with His Tennessee State Prison Band)	24	—	16	In Prison In Person
1978	"This Is the Love"	16	—	37	This Is the Love
1978	"Caribbean"	18	—	20	This Is the Love
1978	"Building Memories"	30	—	39	Greatest Hits
1979	"Hold What You've Got"	36	—	60	Sunny Side Up
1979	"Lorelei"	62	—	—	Sunny Side Up
"—" denotes releases that did not chart

=== 1980s ===
Year	Single	Peak chart positions		Album
Year	Single	US Country	CAN Country	Album
1981	"Innocent Lies" (and His Southern Gentleman)	19	40	I'm Looking Over the Rainbow
1982	"A Place in the Sun" (and His Southern Gentleman)	60	—	I'm Looking Over the Rainbow
1982	"I'm Looking Over the Rainbow" (and Silver)	66	—	I'm Looking Over the Rainbow
1982	"The Fool in Me" (and Silver)	33	—	I'm Looking Over the Rainbow
1983	"Don't Let the Stars Get in Your Eyes" (and Silver)	58	—	I'm Looking Over the Rainbow
"—" denotes releases that did not chart

== Other singles ==
=== Guest singles ===
Year	Single	Artist	Peak positions	Album
Year	Single	Artist	US Country	Album
1985	"One Big Family"	Heart of Nashville	61	non-album single

=== Charted B-sides ===
Year	B-side	Peak positions	A-side
Year	B-side	US Country	A-side
1957	"You're the Reason I'm in Love"	6	"Young Love"
1964	"Ask Marie"	19	"Sugar Lump"
1976	"Back in the Saddle Again"	flip	"The Prisoner's Song"

== Notes ==
- A "Since I Met You Baby" also peaked at number 38 on the RPM Adult Contemporary Tracks chart in Canada.
