= Please Believe Me (song) =

Single by Jimmy Roselli

from the album Core Napulitano
- B-side: "I Don't Want to Walk Without You"
- Released: November 1967
- Genre: Traditional pop
- Label: United Artists
- Songwriters: Al Stillman and Luigi Tenco
- Producer: Henry Jerome

Jimmy Roselli singles chronology
"All the Time" (1967)	"Please Believe Me" (1967)	"'O Surdato 'Nnammurato" (1968)

"Please Believe Me" is a 1967 single by Jimmy Roselli released under United Artists. It was his third and final single released that year, performing well on the adult-oriented charts much like his previous releases.

== Background ==
In the middle of 1967, Roselli had his first big hit, "There Must Be a Way", which reached No. 13 on the Billboard Easy Listening and No. 2 on the Record World Top Non-Rock chart. Riding the success he would release another, but a minor hit single "All the Time", which peaked at No. 19 on the Easy Listening chart. His final single of the year would be "Please Believe", a ballad arranged by Arnold Goland and produced by Henry Jerome, (who would become A&R director of United Artists next year).

== Release and reception ==
"Please Believe Me" was released as a seven inch single in November 1967, on United Artists Records. It was backed by "I Don't Want to Walk Without You" on the B-side, which was lifted from his album There Must Be a Way, released just a few months earlier. The catalogue number of the single was UA 50234, and like with most of Roselli's singles, didn't receive a picture sleeve.

Professional ratings
Review scores
Source	Rating
Record World	4/5 stars

Soon after its release three of the leading American music magazines reviewed the single. Billboard predicted it would reach the top 60 on the Hot 100 and positively wrote that "...this well-written ballad with strong Arnold Goland arrangement is by far his most commercial pop single to date." Cashbox would note "...this side is another of the simply done, solidly sung goodies that should keep the fire burning." Record World commented "He sings this ballad in robust style."

== Chart performance and aftermath ==
The single was commercially successful, being an easy listening hit, and almost breaking into the pop charts. The single would debut on the Billboard Easy Listening chart next year, on January 13th, peaking at No. 31 during a four-week run on it. The single would reach No. 25 on Cashbox's Looking Ahead chart and No. 14 on Record World's Up-Coming Singles chart. It would also peak at No. 29 on the magazine's Top Non-Rock chart. Although Billboard predicted it to reach the Hot 100, the single wouldn't appear on the chart, nor bubble under it.

This was Roselli's final "big" hit song, with the exception of "When Your Wedding Ring Was New" in 1987. In early 1968, Roselli would release the album Core Napulitano, which featured three of his singles, including "Please Believe Me".

== Track listing ==
7" vinyl single

- "Please Believe Me" – 2:21
- "I Don't Want to Walk Without You" – 2:35

== Charts ==
Chart (1968)	Peak position
US Billboard Easy Listening	31
US Cashbox Looking Ahead	25
US Record World Top Non-Rock	29
US Record World Up-Coming Singles	14
