= Today My Way (Patti Page album) =

Studio album by Patti Page
- Released: October 1967
- Genres: Pop-country; easy listening
- Label: Columbia CS 9561
- Producer: Jack Gold

Patti Page chronology
Patti Page's Greatest Hits (1966)	Today My Way (1967)	Gentle on My Mind (1968)

Singles from Today My Way
- 1. "Same Old You" Released: April 1967; 2. "All the Time" Released: July 1967; 3. "Gentle On My Mind" Released: November 1968

Today My Way was a studio album by Patti Page, released by Columbia Records. It was originally released in October 1967 as a vinyl LP. The album was a collection of Page's easy listening interpretations of popular middle-of-the-road and country hits of the era. Today My Way did not chart for the first seven months of its release. The album reached the charts in May 1968 after the third single from the album, "Gentle On My Mind", returned Page to the pop charts in early 1968.

== Chart performance and singles ==
Today My Way debuted on Cashbox magazine's Top 100 Albums chart in the issue dated May 18, 1968, peaking at No. 78 during a six-week run on the chart. The album entered Record World magazine's LP's Coming Up chart in the issue dated May 25, 1968, peaking at a lower No. 95 during a four-week run.

Three singles were featured on Today My Way. "Same Old You" was released as a single in April 1967 backed by "Walkin' - Just Walkin'". It became a top-20 single on America's Billboard Easy Listening chart, rising to the number 16 position. "All the Time" was released as a single in July 1967. The track reached the number 23 position during its six-week run on the Easy Listening chart. "Gentle On My Mind" was taken from the album and received a single release in November 1967, spending sixteen weeks on the Billboard Hot 100 chart in 1968, peaking at number 66, returning her to the chart for the first time in three years. It did better on the Easy Listening charts, and reached the number 7 position.

== Reissue ==
The album was reissued, combined with the 1970 Patti Page album Honey Come Back, in compact disc format, by Collectables Records on November 25, 2003. In addition, three bonus tracks were added to the CD: "Up, Up and Away" and "On the Other Side" (after the 11 tracks of this album) and "Toy Balloon" (after the tracks from Honey Come Back).

== Track listing ==
Side one
No.	Title	Writer(s)	Length
1.	"All the Time"	Mel Tillis, Wayne P. Walker	2:41
2.	"In the Chapel in the Moonlight"	Billy Hill	2:52
3.	"(Darlin') What's She Got That I Ain't Got"	Leon Ashley, Margie Singleton	3:02
4.	"I Haven't Anything Better to Do"	Paul Vance, Lee Pockriss	3:42
5.	"I Take It Back"	Buddy Buie, James Cobb	2:35
6.	"There Goes My Everything"	Dallas Frazier	2:47

Side two
No.	Title	Writer(s)	Length
7.	"Gentle On My Mind"	John Hartford	2:37
8.	"Don't Sleep in the Subway"	Tony Hatch, Jackie Trent	2:56
9.	"Same Old You"	Ruth Ann Roberts	2:33
10.	"Can't Take My Eyes Off You"	Bob Crewe, Bob Gaudio	3:14
11.	"Excuse Me"	Don Addrisi, Dick Addrisi	2:11

== Charts ==
Chart performance for Today My Way
Chart (1968)	Peak position
US Cashbox Top 100 Albums	78
US Record World 100 Top LP's	95

== Personnel ==
All credits are adapted from the liner notes of Today My Way.

- Jack Gold – producer
- Frank Bez – photography
- Patti Page – lead vocals
