= There Goes My Everything =

There Goes My Everything may refer to:

- There Goes My Everything (book), a book by historian and professor Jason Sokol on White Southerners In The Age of Civil Rights, 1945-1975
- "There Goes My Everything" (song), a standard country song covered by Jack Greene, Engelbert Humperdinck, Elvis Presley and others
- There Goes My Everything (album), a 1967 studio released by the song's original music artist Jack Greene
