= Arlie Duff =

American country musician (1924–96)

Arlie Duff (born Arleigh Elton Duff; March 28, 1924 - July 4, 1996) was an American country musician. His biggest hit was "You All Come" in 1953.

== Childhood and adolescence ==
Arlie Duff was born in Texas in 1924. His father Adolphus taught him to sing and he performed in church services with his sister Lois. After serving three years in the US Navy, Duff studied at Stephen F. Austin State College in Nacogdoches and played basketball.

== Career ==
Duff worked as an English teacher, later earning him the nickname "The Singing School Teacher". Duff had written a few songs but never seriously considered a career as a musician. His friend Gordon Baxter was a DJ and advised him to try his hand at music. Duff played a few times with Blackie Crawford and a short time later became a member of his band, the Western Cherokees.

In 1953 Duff recorded his song "You All Come" for the Texan label Starday Records. The single rose to number seven on the Billboard country chart and opened the doors to fame for Duff. Duff was heard in shows like the Louisiana Hayride, Red Foley's Ozark Jubilee, Saturday Night Shindig and the Grand Ole Opry. The title of his hit changed over time to "Y'All Come" and was chosen as the theme song by the Houston Hometown Jamboree. Bill Monroe used the song from then on to close his concerts. Other artists including Bing Crosby, Patti Page, Bobby Bare, Faron Young, Grandpa Jones, George Jones, Bobby Vinton, Minnie Pearl, Glen Campbell, Buck Owens, Porter Wagoner, Gene Pitney and Little Jimmy Dickens recorded their version of the song.

On October 10, 1954, Duff married Nancy White. In 1955 Duff moved from Starday to Decca Records, where he had another chart success with the self-written rockabilly song "Alligator Come Across." Other works as a songwriter include "It's the Little Things" (Sonny James, George Jones, Marie Osmond), "Building Memories" (Sonny James), "Love Me Like There's No Tomorrow (Sonny James), "Til I Heart it From You" (George Jones) and "Another Story" (Ernest Tubb, Leon Redbone). Duff received BMI awards for "Y'All Come" in 1953 and "It's the Little Things" in 1968.

Duff left the music business to take care of his family and focus on radio work. While working at a radio station in Colorado Springs, he made some minor records for the small Smartt label. In 1963 he returned to Texas and worked in Austin and at KKAS in Beaumont. Eventually he settled in Houston.

In 1983 Duff published his autobiography Y'All Come and moved to Woodbury, Connecticut a year later. He died in [Waterbury Connecticut] in 1996 while playing golf. He left behind his wife and eight children and was preceded in death by a son.

== Discography ==
Year	Title	#	Comments
Starday Records
1953	Y’All Come / Poor Ole Teacher	45-103	
1953	A Million Tears / Stuck In The Mud Hole	45-106	
1954	Country Singing (Along The Road) / When The Saints Go Marching In	45-127	with the Duff Trio
1954	Let Me Be Your Salty Dog / Back To The Country	45-132	
1955	Courtin’s Here To Stay / Fifteen Cents A Stop	45-176	
1957	What a Way To Die / You’ve Done It Again	45-302	with the Duff Family
Decca Records
1953	Courtin’ In The Rain / She’s A Housewife, That’s All	9-29243	
1955	I Dreamed Of a Hillbilly-Heaven / Lie Detector	9-29428	
1955	Take It Easy On Me / Pass The Plate of Happiness Around	9-29589	
1956	Home Boy / Oh How I Cried	9-29866	
1956	Alligator Come Across / So Close and Yet So Far	9-29987	
Smartt Records
1958	Send Me An Angel / You’re The One For Me	1001/1002	
1958	A Dark Night, A Lonely Street / Mama, You’ve Had Your Day	1003/1004	
Musicor Records
1967	Best of Everything / Money Hungry	1240	
1967	Speak of the Devil / Touch of Loneliness	1276	
Salvo Records
	In The Big Woods / Croppo Le Blanc	2861	

== Links ==
- Hillbilly-Music.com: Arlie Duff
- AllMusic.com: Arlie Duff
