= Honey Come Back =

Honey Come Back may refer to:

- "Honey Come Back" (song), a song by Glen Campbell
- Honey Come Back (album), an album by Patti Page
