= While Your Lover Sleeps =

Single by Leon Ashley

from the album Laura (What's He Got That I Ain't Got)
- B-side: "That's Alright"
- Released: December 1968
- Genre: Country
- Length: 2:11
- Label: Ashley
- Songwriter(s): Leon Ashley; Buddy Mize; Margie Singleton
- Producer(s): Leon Ashley

Leon Ashley singles chronology
"Flower of Love" (1968)	"While Your Lover Sleeps" (1968)	"Walkin' Back to Birmingham" (1969)

"While Your Lover Sleeps" is a single by American country music artist Leon Ashley. The song peaked at number 25 on the Billboard Hot Country Singles chart. It also reached number 1 on the RPM Country Tracks chart in Canada.

== Chart performance ==
Chart (1969)	Peak position
U.S. Billboard Hot Country Singles	25
Canadian RPM Country Tracks	1
