= Jimmy Roselli =

Italian-American singer (1925–2011)

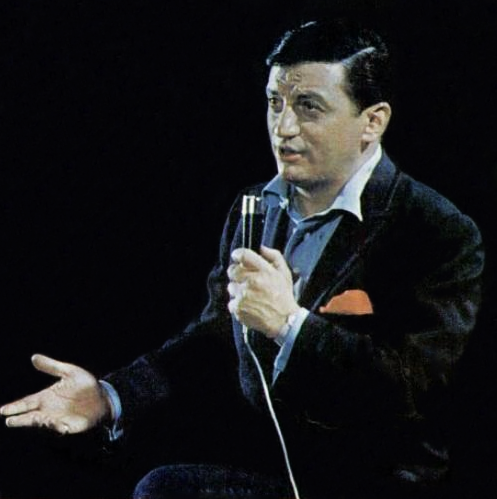
- Roselli in 1965

Background information
- Born: Michael John Roselli; December 26, 1925; Hoboken, New Jersey, U.S.
- Died: June 30, 2011 (aged 85) Clearwater, Florida, U.S.
- Genres: Traditional pop, jazz
- Occupations: Singer, pianist
- Years active: 1954–2011
- Labels: Lenox / Ad-Lib, United Artists, M&R
- Website: www.jimmyroselli.com

Michael John "Jimmy" Roselli (December 26, 1925 – June 30, 2011) was an American pop singer and pianist.

== Early life ==
Roselli was born in Hoboken, New Jersey, the son of Anna Bernadette Lovella, a seamstress, and Phillip Roselli, a boxer. His mother died two days after he was born and his father abandoned him, leaving him in the care of his aunts and his widowed grandfather, Michael Roselli, who spoke no English. He grew up five doors down from Frank Sinatra, who was ten years his senior. In 1944, Roselli joined the United States Army, serving in the 66th Infantry Division. During the war, he witnessed the sinking of the SS Léopoldville and served in northern France and Vienna. After the war, he returned to Hoboken, where he married Angeline Giuffra and had a daughter. During this time, he worked as a construction worker and a pianist. He received his first break in 1954 when Michael "Trigger Mike" Coppola arranged for him to appear with Jimmy Durante at the Boston Latin Quarter.

== Career ==
He had success with the song "Mala Femmena" on his first album Showcase: Jimmy Roselli. It sold over three million records in 1963. It never was a hit song for him, but is considered his signature song. His only charting pop hit was a 1967 remake of "There Must Be a Way", a song previously recorded by Joni James. In addition to reaching No. 93 on the Billboard Hot 100 chart, "There Must Be a Way" was an easy-listening hit, reaching No. 13 in Billboard and No. 2 in Record World. He also had success with the song "All The Time" that same year. The song reached No. 19 on the Billboard easy listening chart. His third and last hit song was "Please Believe Me" in 1968. That song was No. 31 on the Billboard easy listening chart. Those were his only U.S. hit singles, although his version of "When Your Old Wedding Ring Was New" twice appeared in the UK Singles Chart. It peaked at number 51 in 1983, and number 52 in 1987.

At the beginning of his career, with appearances on The Ed Sullivan Show, with Jimmy Durante, and at the Copacabana, critics were calling him a "miracle". As New York magazine states, "guys were trying to put a stranglehold on him. He pushed them all away." Although he was on good terms with a number of mob chieftains, he claimed that he had "never done business with organized criminals". In 1970, Roselli refused Joseph Colombo's offer to sing at a concert that supported the Mob-controlled Italian-American Civil Rights League. After this incident, Roselli was blackballed from singing in clubs and venues owned or controlled by Mafia associates. At times, he was relegated to selling his music out of the trunk of his car parked in Little Italy in Manhattan (he was the founder and owner of M&R Records).

Jimmy Roselli is a favorite among Italian-Americans and his signature tune "Mala Femmina" is featured twice in Martin Scorsese's Mean Streets. Roselli sang in perfect Neapolitan dialect. Other Neapolitan songs recorded by Roselli include "Core 'ngrato", "Anema e core" and "Scapricciatiello". Jerry Lewis said of him that "Roselli sings as an Italian should sing".

Later, as the influence of the Mafia waned, Roselli's career experienced a resurgence. In 1989, he found success in the United Kingdom when he played a series of concerts at the London Palladium. During the 1990s, he also headlined various shows at Trump Plaza Hotel and Casino in Atlantic City.

He sang the title song "Who Can Say?" for the 1966 Italian documentary film Africa Addio.

A book in the late 1990s entitled Making The Wiseguys Weep: The Jimmy Roselli Story was published by David Evanier. A feature film about Jimmy Roselli is being developed by James Ivory and Roger Birnbaum.

Joseph Pistone mentioned an incident he witnessed regarding Roselli during the Feast of San Gennaro in the former FBI agent's book, Donnie Brasco: My Undercover Life in the Mafia.

== Death ==
Roselli died of heart failure in 2011 at his home in Clearwater, Florida.

== Discography ==
=== Albums ===
Year	Title	Peak chart positions		
Year	Title	Record World	Billboard 200	US Christ.
1963	Showcase: Jimmy Roselli	—	—	—
1964	This Heart of Mine	—	—	—
1965	Life & Love Italian Style	84	96	—
1965	Mala Femmena	109	—	—
1965	The Great Ones	—	145	—
1965	Saloon Songs	—	—	—
1965	New York: My Port of Call	—	—	—
1965	Right from the Heart	—	—	—
1966	The Christmas Album	—	—	66
1966	The Italian Album	—	—	—
1967	Saloon Songs Vol. 2	—	—	—
1967	Sold Out: Carnegie Hall Concert	—	—	—
1967	There Must Be a Way	89	191	—
1968	Rock-a-Bye Your Baby	—	—	—
1968	3 A.M.	—	—	—
1969	Core Spezzato	—	184	—
1969	Let Me Sing and I'm Happy	—	—	—
1970	It's Been Swell	—	—	—
1971	Jimmy Roselli	—	—	—
1971	Saloon Songs Vol. 3	—	—	—
1972	Simmo 'E Napule... Paisa	—	—	—

=== Singles (Partial List) ===
Year	Single	Chart positions		
Year	Single	Hot 100	CB	AC
1962	"A Fool in Love" "The Sheik of Araby"	— —	— —	— —
1963	"Mala Femmena" "Her Eyes Shine Like Diamonds"	135 —	101 —	— —
1964	"Anema E Core" "Oh Marie"	— —	125 —	— —
1965	"Don't Cry, Little Girl, Don't Cry" "Just Say I Love Her"	— —	— 140	— —
1965	"Laugh It Off" "Why Don't We Do This More Often"	— —	— —	— —
1966	"I'm Gonna Change Everything" "I'll Never Let You Cry"	— —	— —	29 —
1966	"Buon Natale" (it) "Christmas"	— —	— —	— —
1967	"There Must Be a Way" "I'm Yours To Command"	93 —	90 —	13 —
1967	"All the Time" "There Goes My Everything"	— —	107 —	19 —
1967	"Please Believe Me" "I Don't Want to Walk Without You"	— —	125 —	31 —
1968	"'O Surdato 'Nnammurato" "Bella (Beautiful)"	— —	122 —	— —
1968	"Oh! What It Seemed to Be" "Get Out Of My Heart"	— —	134 —	35 —
1969	"Why Did You Leave Me" "My Heart Cries For You"	— —	— 123	— —
1969	"Senza Mamma e Inamurata!" "E Rrose Parlano"	— —	— —	— —
1969	"I'll Take Care of You" "Buona Sera, Mrs. Campbell"	— —	— —	— 38
