= Gentle on My Mind (Patti Page album) =

Studio album by Patti Page
- Released: June 1968
- Genres: Country pop; easy listening
- Length: 34:43
- Label: Columbia
- Producer: Don Costa

Patti Page chronology
| Today My Way (1967) | Gentle on My Mind (1968) | Honey Come Back (1970) |

Singles from Gentle on My Mind
- 1. "Gentle on My Mind" Released: November 1967; 2. "Little Green Apples" Released: May 1968

Gentle on My Mind was a studio album by Patti Page, released by Columbia Records. It was originally released in June 1968 as a vinyl LP. The album was produced and arranged by Don Costa, and conducted by Patti's long-time accompanist, Rocky Cole. The album includes many other well-known country hits, such as the Jim Reeves hit song, "Four Walls" and a country hit of 1967, "Green Green Grass of Home".

== Chart performance and singles ==
Two singles were featured on Gentle on My Mind . "Gentle On My Mind" was taken from her album Today My Way and received a single release in November 1967, spending sixteen weeks on the Billboard Hot 100 chart in 1968, peaking at number 66, returning her to the chart for the first time in three years. It did much better on the Easy Listening charts, and reached the number 7 position. "Little Green Apples" was released as a single in May 1968. It peaked at No. 96 on the Billboard Hot 100, and at No. 12 on the Easy Listening chart. It served as her final Hot 100 entry as well.

Gentle on My Mind became Page's final album to appear on any pop-oriented chart. It debuted on Billboard magazine's Top LP's chart in the issue dated July 27, 1968, peaking at No. 168 during a six-week run on the chart. It entered Cashbox magazine's Looking Ahead Albums chart, which was a continuation of their Top 100 Albums chart, in the issue dated July 13, 1968, peaking at No. 106 during a three-week run on the chart.

== Reception ==
An unspecified reviewer on Record World said that "The songs here, mostly in the city - country frame, will fall gently on the ear", and noted, "But doesn't everything that Patti sings? 'Gentle on My Mind,' 'Green Green Grass of Home,' 'Skip a Rope,' 'Little Green Apples,' etc."

== Reissue ==
The album was reissued, combined with the 1965 Patti Page album Hush, Hush, Sweet Charlotte, on compact disc by Collectables Records on August 24, 1999.

== Track listing ==
=== Side one ===
| No. | Title | Writer(s) | Length |
|---|---|---|---|
| 1. | "Gentle On My Mind" | John Hartford | 2:34 |
| 2. | "Little Green Apples" | Bobby Russell | 3:03 |
| 3. | "Take Me to Your World" | Billy Sherrill, Glenn Sutton | 2:55 |
| 4. | "Am I That Easy to Forget" | Carl Belew, W.S. Stevenson | 3:21 |
| 5. | "Have a Little Faith" | Billy Sherrill, Glenn Sutton | 2:11 |
| 6. | "Four Walls" | Marvin Moore, George Campbell | 3:18 |

=== Side two ===
| No. | Title | Writer(s) | Length |
|---|---|---|---|
| 7. | "This House" | Annette Tucker, Kathy Wakefield | 3:04 |
| 8. | "Honey (I Miss You)" | Bobby Russell | 4:08 |
| 9. | "Skip a Rope" | Jack Moran, Glenn Douglas Tubb | 2:29 |
| 10. | "Green Green Grass of Home" | Claude "Curly" Putman Jr. | 3:30 |
| 11. | "Release Me" | Eddie Miller, James Pebworth, Robert Yount | 3:30 |
| Total length: | | | 34:43 |

== Charts ==
=== Studio album ===
| Chart (1968) | Peak position |
|---|---|
| US Billboard Top LP's | 168 |
| US Cashbox Looking Ahead Albums | 106 |

=== Singles ===
| Title | Year | Chart | Peak position |
|---|---|---|---|
| "Gentle On My Mind" | 1967 | US Billboard Hot 100 | 66 |
| "Gentle On My Mind" | 1967 | US Easy Listening (Billboard) | 7 |
| "Little Green Apples" | 1968 | US Billboard Hot 100 | 96 |
| "Little Green Apples" | 1968 | US Easy Listening (Billboard) | 12 |
