= Any Old Way You Do =

Single by Jan Howard

from the album This Is Jan Howard Country
- B-side: "Your Ole Handy Man"
- Released: February 1967
- Genre: Country; pop
- Length: 2:21
- Label: Decca
- Songwriter(s): Harlan Howard

Jan Howard singles chronology
"Bad Seed" (1966)	"Any Old Way You Do" (1967)	"Roll Over and Play Dead" (1967)

"Any Old Way You Do" is a song written by Harlan Howard that was originally recorded by his wife and American country artist Jan Howard. Released as a single by Decca Records, it rose into the US country top 40 in 1967 and was later issued on her studio album This Is Jan Howard Country. It was given positive reviews by music publications following its release.

== Background and recording ==
The wife of songwriter Harlan Howard, Jan Howard had her own solo recording career. She had her most successful period during the 1960s decade with songs like "Evil on Your Mind" and "Bad Seed". Among her other charting songs was "Any Old Way You Do". The song was composed by Harlan Howard and was recorded in an uptempo style.

== Release, critical reception and chart performance ==
"Any Old Way You Do" was released as a single by Decca Records in February 1967. It was distributed as a seven-inch vinyl single that also included a B-side: "Your Ole Handy Man". It was given a positive review by music publications following its release. Cashbox called the song "a cute racer" while Billboard called it "outstanding" and predicted it would make the top ten of the country chart. However, the song failed to enter the top ten. Making its debut on March 11, 1967, and spending 11 weeks on the chart, it rose into the top 40 of the US Billboard Hot Country Songs chart, peaking at number 32 in May. It was included on Howard's 1967 studio album titled This Is Jan Howard Country.

== Track listing ==
7" vinyl single

- "Any Old Way You" – 2:21
- "Your Ole Handy Man" – 2:12

== Charts ==
=== Weekly charts ===
Weekly chart performance for "Any Old Way You Do"
Chart (1967)	Peak position
US Hot Country Songs (Billboard)	32
