= Your Tender Loving Care (song) =

Single by Buck Owens

from the album Your Tender Loving Care
- B-side: "What A Liar I Am"
- Released: June 26, 1967
- Genre: Country
- Length: 2:45
- Label: Capitol
- Songwriter(s): Buck Owens
- Producer(s): Ken Nelson

Buck Owens singles chronology
"Sam's Place" (1967)	"Your Tender Loving Care" (1967)	"It Takes People Like You (To Make People Like Me)" (1967)

"Your Tender Loving Care" is the title track from Buck Owens' 1967 album. The single was number one country hit spending one week at the top and a total of fourteen weeks on the chart.

== Record setter ==
When "Your Tender Loving Care" reached No. 1, it established a new record for most No. 1 songs in as many single releases with 15. Owens' streak had started in June 1963 with "Act Naturally," and the next 13 singles he released all had their A-sides reach the No. 1 position on the Hot Country Singles chart; included in that streak was one B-side, "Together Again," the flip side of "My Heart Skips a Beat."

While several of Owens' other singles during that span had B-sides charted on their own but failed to reach No. 1, and there was also a Christmas single in the streak, Billboard chart statistician Joel Whitburn has disregarded all non-No. 1 duets, B-side releases that chart on their own and Christmas releases in determining No. 1 streaks, meaning that Owens had a 15-No. 1 streak. It was the first lengthy streak of No. 1 single releases; due to various factors, artists beforehand rarely had more than three or four No. 1 songs in as many single releases on the country charts.

Owens' chart-topping streak was snapped in January 1968 when Owens' next single, "It Takes People Like You (To Make People Like Me)," peaked at No. 2, held out by "For Loving You" by Bill Anderson and Jan Howard, and "Sing Me Back Home" by Merle Haggard. He went on to score another No. 1 with the next song, "How Long Will My Baby Be Gone," and have five more No. 1 hits in his career.

Owens kept the record for lengthiest No. 1 hit streak until November 1971, when Capitol Records labelmate Sonny James scored his 16th straight No. 1 hit with "Here Comes Honey Again." In the years since, only Earl Thomas Conley and Alabama have had lengthier No. 1 streaks, with 16 and 21 straight No. 1 songs in a row, respectively.

== Chart performance ==
Chart (1967)	Peak position
U.S. Billboard Hot Country Singles	1
