= Hangin' On (The Gosdin Brothers song) =

1967 single by the Gosdin Brothers

Single by The Gosdin Brothers
- B-side: "Multiple Heartaches"
- Released: August 1967
- Recorded: July 1967
- Studio: Gary Paxton Studios, Bakersfield, California
- Genre: Country rock; Bakersfield sound
- Length: 2:46
- Label: Bakersfield International
- Songwriters: Buddy Mize; Ira Allen
- Producer: Gary S. Paxton

The Gosdin Brothers singles chronology
"No Matter Where You Go (There You Are)" (1967)	"Hangin' On" (1967)	"She Still Wishes I Were You" (1968)

"Hangin' On"

Single by Vern Gosdin

from the album Till the End
- B-side: "Yesterday's Gone"
- Released: November 1976
- Recorded: August 1976
- Studio: Sound Stage Studio, Nashville, Tennessee
- Genre: Country
- Length: 2:55
- Label: Elektra Records E-45353
- Songwriters: Buddy Mize, Ira Allen
- Producer: Gary S. Paxton

Vern Gosdin singles chronology
"Hangin' On" (1976)	"Yesterday's Gone" (1977)

"Hangin' On" is a song by the Gosdin Brothers, released in August 1967. It has been recorded by numerous artists, including Joe Simon, Ann Peebles, Cher, Cliff Richard and Ann-Margret & Lee Hazlewood.

Vern Gosdin, who had been one half of the Gosdin Brothers, re-recorded a solo version of "Hangin' On" in 1976. Featuring Emmylou Harris on harmony vocals, this version became his breakthrough solo hit early in 1977.

== Charting versions ==
The Gosdin Brothers

Chart (1967–68)	Peak position
Australia (Kent Music Report)	68
US Hot Country Songs (Billboard)	37

Leon Ashley & Margie Singleton

Chart (1967)	Peak position
US Hot Country Songs (Billboard)	54

Joe Simon

Chart (1968)	Peak position
Canada Top Singles (RPM)	48
US Billboard Hot 100	25
US Hot R&B/Hip-Hop Songs (Billboard)	11

Ann Peebles

Chart (1974)	Peak position
UK Singles (OCC)	54
US Bubbling Under the Hot 100 (Billboard)	102
US Hot R&B/Hip-Hop Songs (Billboard)	37

Vern Gosdin (with Emmylou Harris)

Chart (1977)	Peak position
Canada Country Singles (RPM)	15
US Hot Country Songs (Billboard)	16

Lane Brody

Chart (1984)	Peak position
US Hot Country Songs (Billboard)	59

== Cliff Richard version ==
"(You Keep Me) Hangin' On"
- Cover of the single released in Germany

Single by Cliff Richard
- B-side: "Love Is Here"
- Released: 26 April 1974
- Recorded: 11 & 13 February 1974
- Studio: EMI Studios, London
- Genre: Baroque pop; country
- Length: 2:59
- Label: EMI
- Songwriters: Buddy Mize; Ira Allen
- Producer: David Mackay

Cliff Richard singles chronology
"Take Me High" (1973)	"(You Keep Me) Hangin' On" (1974)	"It's Only Me You Left Behind" (1975)

Richard covered "Hangin' On" in 1974, using the title "(You Keep Me) Hangin' On", as used by Joe Simon and Ann Peebles. It was released as a single in April 1974 with the B-side "Love Is Here", written by Petrina Lordan (who was married to Jerry Lordan) and John Franklin.

=== Track listing ===
7": EMI / EMI 2150

1. "(You Keep Me) Hangin' On" – 2:59
2. "Love Is Here" – 2:02

=== Personnel ===
- Cliff Richard – vocals
- Terry Britten – guitar, backing vocals
- Kevin Peek – acoustic guitar
- Alan Tarney – bass guitar, backing vocals
- Trevor Spencer – drums, percussion
- Cliff Hall – keyboards
- Dave MacRae – keyboards
- Gordon Huntley – steel guitar
- Barrie Guard – percussion
- Anna Peacock – backing vocals
- Jean Hawker – backing vocals
- David Mackay – backing vocals

=== Charts ===
Chart (1974)	Peak position
Ireland (IRMA)	15
Netherlands (Single Tip)	18
New Zealand (Listener)	13
UK Singles (Official Charts)	13
