= Roll Over and Play Dead =

Single by Jan Howard

from the album This Is Jan Howard Country
- B-side: "You and Me and Tears and Roses"
- Released: June 1967
- Genre: Country
- Length: 2:21
- Label: Decca
- Songwriter(s): E. Rich

Jan Howard singles chronology
"Any Old Way You Do" (1967)	"Roll Over and Play Dead" (1967)	"For Loving You" (1967)

"Roll Over and Play Dead" is a song written by E. Rich that was recorded by American country artist Jan Howard. Released as a single by Decca Records, it placed in the top 40 on the US country songs chart in 1967. The song was given positive reviews from music publications following its release and was later included on Howard's studio album This Is Jan Howard Country.

== Background and recording ==
Jan Howard was married to country music songwriter Harlan Howard and after discovering her singing skills, he helped her get a recording contract. Her first commercial success was 1960's "The One You Slip Around With". As the decade progressed, she became identified with uptempo songs that often portrayed assertive women. "Roll Over and Play Dead" was considered to be among these recordings and was composed by E. Rich. In her box set, Howard claimed that the song's writer (E. Rich) was actually a pseudonym for Jerry Reed.

== Release, critical reception and chart performance ==
"Roll Over and Play Dead" was released as a single by Decca Records in June 1967. It was distributed as a seven-inch vinyl record that featured a B-side titled "You and Me and Tears and Roses". Cashbox magazine called the song "a lively stanza" they thought would "please many a country fan". Billboard magazine called it an "infectious rhythm entry" with "fine vocal performance". They also predicted the song would reach the top ten of their country chart. Despite this prediction, the song did not make the top ten list. Making its debut on the US Billboard Hot Country Songs chart on July 22, 1967, it spent a total of ten weeks there before peaking at the number 26 position on September 16. It was Howard's ninth charting US country single and ninth top 40 entry on the same chart. It was included on Howard's 1967 studio album titled This Is Jan Howard Country.

== Track listing ==
7" vinyl single

- "Roll Over and Play Dead" – 2:21
- "You and Me and Tears and Roses" – 2:22

== Charts ==
=== Weekly charts ===
Weekly chart performance for "Roll Over and Play Dead"
Chart (1967)	Peak position
US Hot Country Songs (Billboard)	26
