= There Must Be a Way (album) =

Studio album by Jimmy Roselli
- Released: 1967
- Genre: Vocal Pop
- Label: United Artists
- Producer: Henry Jerome

Jimmy Roselli chronology
Sold Out: Carnegie Hall Concert (1967)	There Must Be a Way (1967)	Rock-a-Bye Your Baby (1968)

Singles from There Must Be a Way
- 1. "There Must Be a Way" Released: 1967; 2. "All the Time" Released: 1967; 3. "Oh! What It Seemed to Be" Released: 1968

There Must Be a Way is an album by American-Italian singer Jimmy Roselli, released in 1967.

== Overview ==
After the success with "There Must Be a Way", his only song to reach the Billboard Hot 100 singles chart, peaking at No. 93 and No. 13 on the Billboard Easy Listening, he recorded the album, There Must Be a Way. It peaked at No. 191 on the Billboard Top LPs chart during a three-week stay on the chart. On Record World's Top 100 LP's the album peaked at No. 89, during a five-week run on the chart.

The album features the hit Roselli song, and other hits from years before, like the Dean Martin hit song, "In the Chapel in the Moonlight", a more orchestral version of Johnnie Ray's hit "Walkin' My Baby Back Home", and some country songs.

"All the Time" was released as a single with the album's release, peaking at No. 19 on the Easy Listening chart, "Oh! What It Seemed to Be" was released as a single the next year and reached No. 35 on the Easy Listening chart. The single stayed on the chart for three weeks.

== Critical reception ==
Billboard stated that "Featuring his hit single, 'There Must Be a Way', Roselli's open, full tones score throughout this highly commercial LP of standards and today's popular tunes. 'There Goes My Everything' and 'Get Out of My Heart' have the right country feeling." Record World noted that the "Big ballads of the last three decades are here-all belted out solidly by Jimmy."

== Track listing ==
Side one
No.	Title	Writer(s)	Length
1.	"There Must Be a Way"	Sammy Gallop, David Saxon, David A. Cook	3:02
2.	"There Goes My Everything"	Dallas Frazier	2:59
3.	"Oh! What It Seemed to Be"	Bennie Benjamin, Frankie Carle, George David Weiss	2:30
4.	"You Wanted Someone to Play With (I Wanted Someone to Love)"	George McConnell, Mike Morris, Neil Osborne	2:25
5.	"Get Out of My Heart"	Guy Louis	2:53

Side two
No.	Title	Writer(s)	Length
6.	"All the Time"	Mel Tillis, Wayne Walker	2:09
7.	"I Don't Want to Walk Without You"	Frank Loesser, Jule Styne	2:37
8.	"Chapel in the Moonlight"	Billy Hill	2:14
9.	"Walkin' My Baby Back Home"	Fred E. Ahlert, Roy Turk	2:43
10.	"Moments to Remember"	Robert Allen, Al Stillman	2:06
Total length:			25:10

== Charts ==
Chart peaks for There Must Be a Way
Chart (1967)	Peak position
US Billboard 200 Top LPs	191
US Record World 100 Top LPs	89
