= This Is Jan Howard Country =

Studio album by Jan Howard
- Released: November 1967
- Genre: Country; Nashville Sound
- Label: Decca

Jan Howard chronology
Bad Seed (1966)	This Is Jan Howard Country (1967)	For Loving You (1967)

Singles from This Is Jan Howard Country
- 1. "Any Old Way You Do" Released: February 1967; 2. "Roll Over and Play Dead" Released: June 1967

This Is Jan Howard Country is a studio album by American country artist Jan Howard. It was released in November 1967 by Decca Records and contained a total of 12 tracks. The album was the fourth released in Howard's career, featuring both uptempo tunes and ballad songs. Along with cover tracks were also new recordings. This included two single releases that made the US country top 40: "Any Old Way You Do" and "Roll Over and Play Dead". The album itself made the US country albums top ten list. It received positive reviews from both Billboard and Cash Box magazines.

== Background, recording and content ==
Jan Howard was the former wife of country songwriter Harlan Howard and after discovering she could sing, he helped her sign a recording contract. Her first commercial success was 1960's "The One You Slip Around With". Her music became more identified with the Nashville Sound sub-genre as the decade progressed, specifically with uptempo tunes that portrayed women in assertive positions. Among these songs was the 1967 charting single "Roll Over and Play Dead" which appeared on This Is Jan Howard Country. The collection consisted of 12 tracks that were handpicked by Howard according to the liner notes. Several covers appear on the album including "Your Good Girl's Gonna Go Bad", "Gentle on My Mind" and "Burning Bridges". Liner notes author Bill Thompson explained that the lyrics of "Gentle on My Mind" were reworked by John Hartford especially for Howard so it could come from a female's perspective. New tracks included "You and Me and Tears and Roses", which was a ballad originally from Germany.

== Release and critical reception ==
This Is Jan Howard was released by Decca Records in November 1967. It was the fourth studio album in Howard's music career and her third with Decca. It was distributed by the label as a vinyl LP offered in both mono and stereo formats. Following its release, the album was given reviews from music publications. Billboard believed the album would be "a sure sales jumper" with "stirring" renditions of cover songs. Cash Box also thought the album would have "a healthy amount of chart action" and called it "a winning effort". Concluding, the publication wrote, "Keep this one high on your list of disks to watch."

== Chart performance and singles ==
This Is Jan Howard made its debut on the US Billboard Top Country Albums chart on December 9, 1967. Spending 11 weeks there, it rose to the number nine position on January 20, 1968. It was Howard's third album to make Billboard country survey and her highest-peaking album on the survey as a solo recording artist. In total, it was one of four albums by Howard to make the country survey top ten. Two singles were included on This Is Jan Howard Country. The earliest single released was "Any Old Way You Do", which Decca first issued in February 1967. It rose into the US country songs top 40, peaking at number 32. "Roll Over and Play Dead" was then issued as a single by Decca in June 1967 and also rose into the US country top 40, peaking at number 26.

== Track listing ==
Side one
No.	Title	Writer(s)	Length
1.	"Roll Over and Play Dead"	E. Rich	2:18
2.	"Love Me and Make It All Better"	Eddie Rabbitt	2:28
3.	"Your Good Girl's Gonna Go Bad"	Billy Sherrill; Glenn Sutton	1:50
4.	"You Don't Know Me"	Eddy Arnold; Cindy Walker	2:35
5.	"You and Me and Tears and Roses"	Heinz Bucholz; Jim Glaser; Karl Goetz	2:22
6.	"Break My Mind"	John D. Loudermilk	3:01

Side two
No.	Title	Writer(s)	Length
1.	"Gentle on My Mind"	John Hartford	3:01
2.	"A Fallen Star"	James Joiner	2:35
3.	"Your Ole Handy Man"	Dolly Parton	2:12
4.	"Burning Bridges"	Walter Scott	2:32
5.	"All the Time"	Mel Tillis; Wayne P. Walker	2:32
6.	"Any Old Way You Do"	Harlan Howard	2:21

== Chart performance ==
Chart (1967–68)	Peak position
US Top Country Albums (Billboard)	9

== Release history ==
Region	Date	Format	Label	Ref.
North America	November 1967	Vinyl LP (Mono); Vinyl LP (Stereo)	Decca Records	
