= There Must Be a Way =

1945 popular song

"There Must Be a Way" is a song written by David Saxon, Robert Cook and Sammy Gallop in 1945. The first recording was by Johnnie Johnston with Paul Baron and His Orchestra in the same year.

== Background ==
The song was published in the post–World War II era, part of a wave of sentimental ballads expressing love, longing, and heartbreak — very much in the style of traditional pop and pre-rock balladry. It became a standard in pop and easy listening, covered by many notable artists over the years.

== Early recordings ==
"There Must Be a Way"

Single by Joni James

from the album More Joni Hits
- B-side: "Sorry for Myself?"
- Released: January 11, 1959
- Recorded: 1958
- Genre: Traditional pop
- Length: 2:39
- Label: MGM

Joni James singles chronology
"There Goes My Heart" (1958)	"There Must Be a Way" (1959)	"I Still Get a Thrill" (1959)

- Connee Boswell and The Paulette Sisters (1945): An early recording of the song, reflecting its initial popularity. She released the song as a single with the B-side "Something Sentimental".
- Perry Como recorded the song in a 1947 session with Russ Case and His Orchestra; it was released in June 1948 as the B-side to “Rambling Rose” (RCA Victor 20‑2947). The single "Rambling Rose" spent 14 weeks on the Billboard chart starting July 23, 1948, and reached a peak position of No. 18.
- Joni James recorded the song in 1959. Her recording peaked at No. 33 on the Billboard Hot 100 spending 12 weeks there. In another American chart magazine, Cashbox, the single peaked at No. 28. It reached No. 30 on the Canadian singles chart and No. 24 on the UK singles chart. It was her most successful song of the year, and all years after.

== Later recordings ==
"There Must Be a Way"

Single by Frankie Vaughan

from the album There Must Be a Way
- B-side: "You're Nobody till Somebody Loves You"
- Released: 11 August 1967
- Recorded: Mid 1967
- Genre: Traditional pop, vocal pop
- Length: 2:53
- Label: Columbia

Frankie Vaughan singles chronology
"Cabaret" (1966)	"There Must Be a Way" (1967)	"So Tired" (1967)

- Jerry Vale (1965): Vale's interpretation of the song was featured on his album There Goes My Heart, which included many past hits and standards.
- Frankie Vaughan recorded the song in 1967, it reached number 7 on the UK singles chart, (staying on the chart for 21 weeks) and number 19 on the Irish Singles Chart. It was his most successful song of the year, and all years after. With the success, he recorded an album with the same name, which was his only charting studio album, reaching No. 22 in the UK.
- "There Must Be a Way" by Louis Armstrong was released in 1968, produced by Bob Thiele. It was later included on his album What a Wonderful World.

== Jimmy Roselli version ==
"There Must Be a Way"

Single by Jimmy Roselli

from the album There Must Be a Way
- B-side: "I'm Yours To Command"
- Released: June 1967
- Genre: Traditional pop, easy listening
- Length: 3:04
- Label: United Artists
- Producer: Henry Jerome

Jimmy Roselli singles chronology
"I'm Gonna Change Everything" (1966)	"There Must Be a Way" (1967)	"All the Time" (1967)

=== Release and reception ===
Jimmy Roselli recorded the song in early 1967. United Artists Records released it as a seven-inch single with "I'm Yours To Command" on the B-side. "There Must Be a Way" was arranged by Hutch Davie, and both songs were produced by Henry Jerome who Roselli would work with for the rest of the tear. Record World called it a "velvety reprise of the oldie."

=== Chart performance ===
It was his first and only single that appeared on the Billboard Hot 100, peaking at No. 93 on August 12, 1967. It was his most successful song on the Billboard Easy Listening chart, where it peaked at No. 13, And his most successful single on the Cashbox Top 100 Singles chart, where it reached No. 90 and stayed on the it for 9 weeks. The single would also go on to reach No. 2 on Record World's Top Non-Rock chart, which was similar to Billboard's Easy Listening chart. On the magazine's 100 Top Pops chart the single would stall at No. 87 and quickly drop out.

=== Aftermath ===
The single's success made him rush out two more singles that year, but none cracked the top 100s. Roselli, like Frankie Vaughan, also released an album titled There Must Be a Way in 1967.

== Charts ==
Joni James
Chart (1959)	Peak position
US Billboard Hot 100	33
US Cashbox Top 100 Singles	28
Canada CHUM Singles Chart	30
UK Singles Chart	24

Frankie Vaughan
Chart (1967)	Peak position
UK Singles Chart	7
Irish Singles Chart	19

Jimmy Roselli
Chart (1967)	Peak position
US Billboard Hot 100	93
US Billboard Easy Listening	13
US Cashbox Top 100 Singles	90
US Record World 100 Top Pops	87
US Record World Top Non-Rock	2
