= Honey Come Back (album) =

Studio album by Patti Page
- Released: February 25, 1970
- Genres: Pop-country; easy listening
- Length: 33:12
- Label: Columbia

Patti Page chronology
Gentle on My Mind (1968)	Honey Come Back (1970)	I'd Rather Be Sorry (1971)

Honey Come Back is a studio album by Patti Page, released by Columbia Records. It was originally released in May 1970 as a vinyl LP.

The album was reissued, combined with the 1967 Patti Page album Today My Way, on compact disc by Collectables Records on November 25, 2003. In addition, three bonus tracks were added to the CD: "Up, Up and Away", "On the Other Side" (after the 11 tracks of Today My Way), and "Toy Balloon" (after the tracks from this album).

== Track listing ==
Side one
No.	Title	Writer(s)	Length
1.	"I'll Never Fall in Love Again"	Burt Bacharach; Hal David	3:03
2.	"Come Saturday Morning"	Fred Karlin; Dory Previn	2:54
3.	"Wonderful World, Beautiful People"	Jimmy Cliff	2:56
4.	"A Brand New Me"	Jerry Butler; Kenny Gamble; Theresa Bell	3:04
5.	"Early in the Morning"	Mike Leander; Edward Seago	2:59
6.	"La La La (If I Had You)"	Danny Janssen	2:46
Total length:			17:42

Side two
No.	Title	Writer(s)	Length
1.	"Something"	George Harrison	2:52
2.	"Yester-Me, Yester-You, Yesterday"	Ronald Dean Miller; Bryan Wells	2:47
3.	"Winter World of Love"	Leslie Reed; Barry Mason	3:31
4.	"Raindrops Keep Fallin' on My Head"	Burt Bacharach; Hal David	3:14
5.	"Honey Come Back"	Jimmy Webb	3:06
Total length:			15:30
