= Stamp Out Loneliness =

Single by Stonewall Jackson

from the album Help Stamp Out Loneliness
- A-side: "Road to Recovery"
- Released: December 27, 1966
- Recorded: 1966
- Genre: Country
- Length: 2:35
- Label: Columbia
- Songwriter(s): C. Belew, V. Givens
- Producer(s): Don Law, Frank Jones

Stonewall Jackson singles chronology
"Blues Plus Booze (Means I Lose" (1966)	"Stamp Out Loneliness" (1966)	"Promises and Hearts (Were Made to Break" (1967)

"Stamp Out Loneliness" is a song written by C. Belew and V. Givens, performed by Stonewall Jackson, and released on the Columbia label (catalog no. 4–43966). It debuted on the Billboard country and western chart in February 1967, peaked at the No. 5 spot, and remained on the chart for a total of 14 weeks.
