= There Goes My Everything (album) =

Studio album by Jack Greene
- Released: December 1966
- Recorded: February 1965 – November 1966
- Studio: Bradley's Barn, Mount Juliet, Tennessee
- Genre: Country
- Label: Decca Records
- Producer: Owen Bradley

Jack Greene chronology
| There Goes My Everything (1966) | All the Time (1967) |

Singles from There Goes My Everything
- 1. "Don't You Ever Get Tired (Of Hurting Me)" Released: April 1965; 2. "Ever Since My Baby Went Away" Released: October 1965; 3. "There Goes My Everything" Released: October 1966

There Goes My Everything is a studio album by American country music artist Jack Greene. It was released in December 1966 on Decca Records and was produced by Owen Bradley. It was Greene's debut studio album as a recording artist after playing in the band of Ernest Tubb for several years. Three singles were included in the album. Its biggest hit was the title track, which topped the country charts in 1966 and helped jump start Greene's music career. The album itself would also reach peak positions on the Billboard country chart following its release.

== Background and content ==
There Goes My Everything came to be recorded through Greene's membership in Ernest Tubb's concert band. As a drummer and occasional vocalist, he was featured on Tubb's single, "The Last Letter", which brought him widespread attention. The performance led to his contract with Decca Records, which spawned the recording of the album. There Goes My Everything was recorded in several sessions starting in February 1965 and ending in November 1966. All recording sessions were held at Bradley's Barn, a studio in Mount Juliet, Tennessee owned by the album's producer, Owen Bradley. The album contained 12 songs, some of which were cover versions of hits previously recorded by other artists. The third track was a cover of "Almost Persuaded" by David Houston. The seventh track was a cover of Buck Owens's "Together Again". The tenth track, "Here Comes My Baby", was recorded by Dottie West.

== Release and reception ==
Professional ratings
Review scores
| Source | Rating |
|---|---|
| Allmusic | 3/5 stars |

There Goes My Everything was officially released on Decca Records in December 1966. The album peaked at number one on the Billboard Top Country Albums chart by February 1967. It became Greene's only album to reach this position on the chart. In addition, it peaked at number 66 on the Billboard 200 albums list in April 1967, becoming one of two releases by Greene to enter this chart. The album was later reviewed by Greg Adams of Allmusic, who gave the release three of five possible stars. "The LP that contains Greene's signature song is otherwise standard country album fare, comprised almost entirely of covers of recent country hits", Adams commented.

The record included three singles that were released between 1965 and 1966. The first single release was 1965's "Don't You Ever Get Tired (Of Hurting Me)", which did not chart on any Billboard publications. It was the album's second single, "Ever Since My Baby Went Away", that made a chart appearance, peaking at number 37 on the Billboard Hot Country Singles chart. The third and final single was the title track, which topped the Billboard country songs chart in December 1966. The single would remain at the number 1 position for nearly two months and help Greene win the Country Music Association's Male Vocalist of the Year award. The album itself would also win the Album of the Year award.

== Track listing ==
Side one
| No. | Title | Writer(s) | Length |
|---|---|---|---|
| 1. | "There Goes My Everything" | Dallas Frazier | 2:33 |
| 2. | "Walking on New Grass" | Ray Pennington | 2:18 |
| 3. | "Almost Persuaded" | Billy Sherrill; Glenn Sutton | 2:48 |
| 4. | "A Wound Time Can't Erase" | Bill D. Johnson | 3:01 |
| 5. | "Think I'll Go Somewhere and Cry Myself to Sleep" | Bill Anderson | 3:01 |
| 6. | "Ever Since My Baby Went Away" | Marty Robbins | 2:38 |

Side two
| No. | Title | Writer(s) | Length |
|---|---|---|---|
| 1. | "Together Again" | Buck Owens | 2:19 |
| 2. | "The Hurt's on Me" | Don Bowman | 2:10 |
| 3. | "Make the World Go Away" | Hank Cochran | 2:28 |
| 4. | "Here Comes My Baby" | Bill West; Dottie West | 2:42 |
| 5. | "Tender Years" | Darrell Edwards; George Jones | 2:33 |
| 6. | "Don't You Ever Get Tired (Of Hurting Me)" | Cochran | 2:20 |

== Personnel ==
All credits are adapted from the liner notes of There Goes My Everything.

Musical personnel

- Harold Bradley – guitar
- Pete Drake – steel guitar
- Ray Edenton – guitar
- Jack Greene – lead vocals
- Buddy Harman – drums
- Roy Huskey – bass
- The Jordanaires – background vocals
- Bob Moore – bass
- Hargus "Pig" Robbins – piano
- Hal Rugg – steel guitar
- Jerry Smith – piano
- Pete Wade – guitar

Technical personnel

- Owen Bradley – producer
- Roy Buksbaum – photography
- Ralph Emery – liner notes

== Chart performance ==
| Chart (1966–1967) | Peak position |
|---|---|
| US Billboard 200 | 66 |
| US Top Country Albums (Billboard) | 1 |
