= Laura (What's He Got That I Ain't Got) =

- South African release picture sleeve

Single by Leon Ashley

from the album Laura (What's He Got That I Ain't Got)
- B-side: "With the Help of the Wine"
- Released: July 1967
- Recorded: 1967
- Genre: Country
- Length: 2:31
- Label: Ashley
- Songwriters: Leon Ashley, Margie Singleton
- Producer: Leon Ashley

Leon Ashley singles chronology
"Before You Were Mine" (1967)	"Laura (What's He Got That I Ain't Got)" (1967)	"Hangin' On" (1967)

"Laura (What's He Got That I Ain't Got)" is a song co-written and recorded by American country music singer Leon Ashley. Recorded in 1967 and released on his own Ashley Records label, the song was his only No. 1 single that September. Frankie Laine and Brook Benton took cover versions to the pop and Adult Contemporary charts that year, while Claude King, Marty Robbins and Kenny Rogers charted their own versions on the country charts.

== Background ==
Ashley had previously released several singles on the Goldband and Imperial record labels, but none of his singles were successful. Then, in 1967, Ashley founded his own label, Ashley Records. That year, he recorded a song he co-wrote with his wife, Margie Singleton: "Laura (What's He Got That I Ain't Got)." Released that July, "Laura" went on to become a No. 1 smash on the Billboard Hot Country Singles chart by the end of September.

=== Plot ===
The song is told from the perspective of Laura's husband, and depicts a confrontation the two are having regarding an apparently crumbling marriage.

In the first verse, the husband has Laura touch, hold and caress various parts of his body, such as his lips, ears, hair and hands. Later, he reminds her of the various things he did for her and gave her during their marriage, such as building a home, and buying fancy items such as satin pillows, dresses and curtains; he also demands that she read their names on their checks, which sit in her handbag.

Each refrain calls Laura out, saying he is aware that she is having an affair with another man. The husband demands to know "what's he got that I ain't got," bemoaning the fact that it "must be something I was born without." Just before each refrain, he warns that he has grown angry and gone crazy as a result of this affair and not knowing why she has turned to another man. In the first verse, he warns that "you took an awful chance to be with another man." The warning before the second refrain turns noticeably darker, warning of violence with the lyric "And if there's time before I pull this trigger." It is not known or stated where the barrel of the gun is targeted — at the singer himself, who may be contemplating suicide; at Laura, as a direct consequence for her infidelity; or at the "other man," should the singer have walked in on him and Laura "in flagrante delicto."

== Cover versions ==
Following Ashley's original, the song has been covered several times. Frankie Laine and Brook Benton concurrently released their own versions of the song in September 1967. These versions debuted on the Easy Listening (now Hot Adult Contemporary Tracks) charts in the same week, and both made the lower regions of the Billboard Hot 100.

Three other country music covers charted as well. Claude King sent a version to number 50 on the country singles chart in 1967 shortly after Ashley's version fell from Number One. Marty Robbins also recorded a cover version in 1973, taking it to number 60 on the Hot Country Singles chart, and Kenny Rogers took his 1977 cover to number 19 from his self-titled album. Other covers include Tommy Collins, Tommy Overstreet, David Houston, and Hank Locklin.

== Charts ==
=== Leon Ashley ===
Chart (1967)	Peak position
U.S. Billboard Hot Country Singles	1
U.S. Billboard Bubbling Under Hot 100	20
Canadian RPM Country Tracks	7

=== Frankie Laine ===
Chart (1967)	Peak position
US Billboard Hot 100	63
US Adult Contemporary (Billboard)	23

=== Brook Benton ===
Chart (1967)	Peak position
US Billboard Hot 100	78
US Adult Contemporary (Billboard)	37

=== Claude King ===
Chart (1967)	Peak position
US Hot Country Songs (Billboard)	50

=== The Newbeats ===
Chart (1970)	Peak position
U.S. Billboard Hot 100	115

=== Marty Robbins ===
Chart (1973)	Peak position
US Hot Country Songs (Billboard)	60
Canadian RPM Country Tracks	44

=== Kenny Rogers ===
Chart (1976)	Peak position
US Hot Country Songs (Billboard)	19
Canadian RPM Country Tracks	39
