= Here Comes Honey Again =

Single by Sonny James

from the album Here Comes Honey Again
- B-side: "Only Ones We Truly Hurt (Are the Ones We Truly Love)"
- Released: September 1971
- Genre: Country
- Label: Capitol
- Songwriter(s): Sonny James, Carole Smith

Sonny James singles chronology
| "Bright Lights, Big City" (1971) | "Here Comes Honey Again" (1971) | "Only Love Can Break a Heart" (1971) |

"Here Comes Honey Again" is a 1971 single by Sonny James written by James and Carole Smith. "Here Comes Honey Again" was the last of sixteen, number one country hits in a row for Sonny James. His next release, his remake of "Only Love Can Break a Heart", would peak at number two on country charts. "Here Comes Honey Again" would stay at number one for a single week and spend a total of fourteen weeks on the country chart.

== No. 1 hits record ==
On the U.S. Billboard Hot Country Singles chart, "Here Comes Honey Again" established James as the new record holder for most No. 1 songs in as many single releases with 16, surpassing Buck Owens (his labelmate at Capitol Records) who had 15 consecutive No. 1 songs without a miss from 1963 to 1967. James' streak had started in 1967 with "Need You," and save for non-charting Christmas singles released between 1967 and 1970, every one of his songs went to No. 1. The next single release, "Only Love Can Break a Heart," peaked at No. 2 – held out by Freddie Hart's "My Hang-Up Is You," breaking the streak. James held the new record of 16 in a row without a miss until August 1985, when Alabama scored their 17th-straight No. 1 song in as many non-holiday single releases with "40 Hour Week (For a Livin')."

== Chart performance ==
| Chart (1971) | Peak position |
|---|---|
| U.S. Billboard Hot Country Singles | 1 |
| Canadian RPM Country Tracks | 4 |
