= Leon Ashley =

American country music singer (1936–2013)

- Birth name: Leon Walton
- Born: May 18, 1936 Mansfield, Georgia
- Origin: Covington, Georgia, U.S.
- Died: October 20, 2013 (aged 77) Hendersonville, Tennessee
- Genres: Country
- Occupation: Singer-songwriter
- Instrument: Vocals
- Years active: 1960–1980
- Labels: Goldband, Imperial, Dot, Ashley

Leon Walton (May 18, 1936 – October 20, 2013), better known by his stage name Leon Ashley, was an American country music singer. He is known mainly for his single "Laura (What's He Got That I Ain't Got)", which topped the country singles charts in 1967. This single was distributed on his own label. Ashley recorded, released, distributed and published the single on his own. Besides this song, he released several other singles throughout the 1960s and 1970s.

== Biography ==
Leon Walton was born on May 18, 1936, in Covington, Georgia. He first performed at age nine on a local radio show, and released his first single in 1960 on Goldband Records. This single did not attract significant airplay, neither did later releases on Imperial Records and Dot Records. Ashley eventually married singer Margie Singleton.

In 1964, Ashley founded his own label, Ashley Records. The label's releases proved more successful than his releases on Goldband and Imperial, with one Ashley Records release — "Laura (What's He Got That I Ain't Got)" — becoming his only number 1 country hit that year. This song made him the first country music artist "to write, record, release, distribute and publish his own material", according to Allmusic. An album, also entitled Laura (What's He Got That I Ain't Got), reached No. 10 on the Top Country Albums chart. He had several more hit singles soon afterward, including more duets with Singleton, as well as a duets album on the Ashley label. One single, "While Your Lover Sleeps", reached No. 1 on the Canadian country charts. His chart success waned by 1969, however, and he shifted his focus to songwriting for other artists. Brook Benton and Frankie Laine concurrently sent of "Laura" to the pop and A.C. charts in 1969, and Claude King sent a version to the lower regions of the country charts shortly after Ashley's version fell from the top of the charts. Marty Robbins also charted in 1973 with it, and Kenny Rogers sent a cover to No. 19 three years later.

Ashley died in Hendersonville, Tennessee on October 20, 2013, after a lengthy illness.

== Discography ==
=== Albums ===
Year	Album	Chart Positions
Year	Album	US Country
1967	Laura (What's He Got That I Ain't Got)	10
1968	Ode to Billie Joe	—
1969	A New Brand of Country (with Margie Singleton)	—
1970	Ease Up: By Special Request	—

=== Singles ===
Year	Song	Chart Positions	
Year	Song	US Country	CAN Country
1960	"He'll Never Go"	—	—
1961	"Teen Age Angel"	—	—
1961	"It's Alright Baby"	—	—
1962	"Not Going Home"	—	—
1964	"You Give Me Reason to Live"	—	—
1966	"How Can We Divide These Little Hearts" (with Margie Singleton)	—	—
1967	"Most Men"	—	—
1967	"Before You Were Mine"	—	—
1967	"Laura (What's He Got That I Ain't Got)"^{A}	1	7
1967	"Hangin' On" (with Margie Singleton)	54	—
1967	"Anna, I'm Taking You Home"	28	—
1968	"Mental Journey"	14	4
1968	"You'll Never Be Lonely Again" (with Margie Singleton)	55	—
1968	"Flower of Love"	8	—
1968	"While Your Lover Sleeps"	25	1
1969	"Walkin' Back to Birmingham"	23	—
1969	"Ain't Gonna Worry"	55	—
1969	"If Love Has Died" (with Margie Singleton)	—	—
1970	"Life for a Wife"	—	—
1970	"All That Love Is Gone" (with Margie Singleton)	—	—
1970	"Brace Up and Face It"	—	—
1970	"Happy Loving You" (with Margie Singleton)	—	—
1970	"Mama's Ten"	—	—
1971	"There Ain't No Easy Way"	—	—
1972	"Ease Up"(with Margie Singleton)	—	—
1972	"There's Not a Single Thing About Me"	—	—
1973	"Love Fits Me Better"	—	—
1980	"Look What Loving Me Has Done to You"	—	—
1980	"Dear Willie (A Letter from Luckenbach)"	—	—

- ^{A}Peaked at No. 20 on Bubbling Under Hot 100.
