= I'll Never Find Another You =

1964 single by the Seekers

Single by the Seekers

from the album The Best of the Seekers
- B-side: "Open Up Them Pearly Gates"
- Released: December 1964
- Recorded: 4 November 1964
- Studio: Abbey Road Studios, London
- Genre: Folk-pop, Gospel
- Length: 2:40
- Label: EMI Columbia DB 7431, Capitol
- Songwriter: Tom Springfield
- Producer: Tom Springfield

The Seekers singles chronology
"I'll Never Find Another You" (1964)	"What Have They Done to the Rain" (1965)

"I'll Never Find Another You"

Single by Sonny James

from the album I'll Never Find Another You
- B-side: "Goodbye Maggie Goodbye"
- Released: May 1967
- Genre: Country
- Label: Capitol
- Songwriter: Tom Springfield
- Producer: Kelso Herston

Sonny James singles chronology
"Need You" (1967)	"I'll Never Find Another You" (1967)	"It's the Little Things" (1967)

"I'll Never Find Another You" is a 1964 single by the Australian folk-influenced pop group the Seekers. It reached No. 1 in the United Kingdom in February 1965. It was The Seekers' first UK-released single, and the second most-popular of 1965 in the UK. The song was also popular in the United States, reaching peaks of No. 4 pop and No. 2 easy listening on the Billboard Hot 100 charts. The B-Side was the gospel song, "Open Up The Pearly Gates."

The track was written and produced by Tom Springfield, who was also responsible for most of the Seekers' subsequent hits.

It experienced a 1967 US revival as a country music No. 1 by Sonny James.

In July 2018, the tune was featured in a Westpac bank TV advertisement in Australia, covered by Julia Jacklin.

The song was added to the National Film and Sound Archive of Australia's Sounds of Australia registry in 2011.

== Chart performance ==
=== The Seekers ===
Chart (1964–1965)	Peak position
Australian Kent Music Report	1
Canada CHUM Charts	6
Malaysia	3
Norway VG-lista	6
UK Singles Chart	1
U.S. Billboard Hot 100	4
U.S. Billboard Easy Listening	2
Ireland	2

=== Sonny James ===
Chart (1967)	Peak position
U.S. Billboard Hot Country Singles	1
U.S. Billboard Hot 100	97

== See also ==
- List of best-selling singles of the 1960s in the United Kingdom
