= Sam's Place =

Single by Buck Owens

from the album Your Tender Loving Care
- B-side: "Don't Ever Tell Me Goodbye"
- Released: March 13, 1967
- Genre: Country
- Length: 2:00
- Label: Capitol
- Songwriter(s): Buck Owens; Red Simpson
- Producer(s): Ken Nelson

Buck Owens singles chronology
"Where Does the Good Times Go" (1966)	"Sam's Place" (1967)	"Your Tender Loving Care" (1967)

"Sam's Place" is a 1967 country song written by Buck Owens and Red Simpson and recorded by Owens. The single went to number one on the country charts spending three weeks at the top and a total of thirteen weeks on the country charts.

== Content ==
The song is about a honky-tonk called "Sam's Place," of which the singer is a regular all-night patron ("You can always find me down at Sam's Place from the setting sun until the break of day."). Other patrons include two women who are nicknamed for their dancing abilities and whose real names happen to rhyme with their respective hometowns: "Shimmy-Shakin'" Tina from Pasadena and "Hootchie-Kootchie" Hattie from Cincinnati.

== Chart performance ==
Chart (1967)	Peak position
U.S. Billboard Hot Country Singles	1
U.S. Billboard Hot 100	92
