= Where Does the Good Times Go =

Single by Buck Owens

from the album It Takes People Like You
- B-side: "The Way That I Love You"
- Released: December 26, 1966
- Genre: Country
- Length: 2:18
- Label: Capitol
- Songwriter(s): Buck Owens
- Producer(s): Ken Nelson

Buck Owens singles chronology
| "Open Up Your Heart" (1966) | "Where Does the Good Times Go" (1966) | "Sam's Place" (1967) |

"Where Does the Good Times Go" is a 1967 single by Buck Owens. "Where Does the Good Times Go" was a number one country hit spending four weeks at the top spot and fourteen weeks on the chart.

== Chart performance ==
| Chart (1966–1967) | Peak position |
|---|---|
| U.S. Billboard Hot Country Singles | 1 |
| U.S. Billboard Bubbling Under Hot 100 | 14 |
