= Margie Singleton =

American singer-songwriter (born 1935)

- Born: Margaret Louise Ebey; October 12, 1935 (age 90); Coushatta, Louisiana, United States
- Genres: Country
- Occupations: Singer, songwriter
- Instrument: Vocals
- Years active: 1957–present
- Labels: Starday Records; Mercury Records; United Artists Records; Monument Records

Margaret Louise Ebey (born October 12, 1935), known professionally as Margie Singleton, is an American country music singer and songwriter. In the 1960s, she was a popular duet and solo recording artist, working with country stars George Jones and Faron Young. Singleton had her biggest hit with Young called "Keeping Up with the Joneses" in 1964. She managed a successful solo career in the 1960s.

== Biography ==
=== Early life and rise to fame ===
She was born in Coushatta, Louisiana, United States. As a young child, she was influenced by blues and gospel music. In 1949, at the age of 13, she married Shelby Singleton. They worked at a munitions plant near Shreveport, Louisiana, during the Korean War. She began to play guitar and write songs as a teenager after the birth of her first child, Stephen Singleton, in 1950. She had her second son, Sidney Singleton, in 1955.

In 1957, she signed with Starday Records, and released her first single that same year called "One Step (Nearer to You)". The flip side of the single was called "Not What He's Got". Both of these songs were self-penned. In 1958, she made her radio and professional debut on Louisiana Hayride. That same year, she released two other singles, "Nothing but True Love" and "Teddy" with a great B-side, the outstanding rockabilly "oo-wee (you're the one for me)all penned by Shelby Singleton and her. "Nothing but true love" was more successful, becoming a minor hit on the country music chart, reaching the top 25. She regularly appeared on Louisiana Hayride before moving to Jubilee USA in 1960.

=== Height of career in 1960s ===
Singleton released another single in 1959 called "The Eyes of Love". The song gave Singleton her first major hit when it reached the top 20 in 1960. In 1961, she switched to Mercury Records where her husband Shelby Singleton was a producer. With his help, Singleton recorded a duet with George Jones called "Did I Ever Tell You". The song became another hit for Singleton, and was released in 1961. The following year, the duo had equal success with another country hit called "Waltz of the Angels".

Singleton continued to be an avid songwriter. She wrote a pop music hit for Brook Benton called "Lie to Me". In 1963, he had another pop hit with another song written by Singleton called "My True Confession". In 1963, Singleton made her debut on country music's most coveted show, the Grand Ole Opry; and had another hit with the song "Old Records". In addition to being a solo and duet star, she also sang as a back-up vocalist with The Jordanaires. Numerous performers recorded many of her songs, including Teresa Brewer, Tammy Wynette, and Charley Pride. In 1964, Singleton teamed up with singer Faron Young. Together, they recorded the song "Keeping Up with the Joneses". That year, the song reached the country top five, and became Singleton's biggest hit. The flip side of the single, "No Thanks, I Just Had One", was a top 40 country hit. They continued to release singles and record together.

By 1965, Singleton was divorced from Shelby Singleton. That same year, she married Leon Ashley, and soon moved to United Artists Records. In 1967, she moved to her husband's label, Ashley Records. That year, she recorded a cover version of the Bobbie Gentry hit song "Ode to Billie Joe", which reached the country top 40. She had a top 60 duet with her husband called "Hangin' On" in 1968. That same year, she appeared in a movie with Marty Robbins called Road to Nashville. Her chart success was fading rapidly, although she continued to record, including the first version of "Harper Valley PTA" that was later a huge crossover hit by Jeannie C. Riley.

=== Later career ===
Singleton continued to record for her husband's label, but with no further chart entries. She toured with her husband Leon with the Country Music Spectacular, and with his band, Strings of Nashville. He died in 2014. Singleton returned to the studio, recording a new gospel CD, as well as revisiting yesterday and re-recording some of her past hits and favorites. She continues to play dates and enjoys writing. She has recorded and released a video for her self-penned song, "Heaven or Hell" (2018).

== Discography ==
=== Albums ===
Year	Album
1962	Duets Country Style (with George Jones)
1965	Cryin' Time
1967	Sings Country Music with Soul
1968	Harper Valley PTA
1969	New Brand of Country (with Leon Ashley)
1969	Ode to Billie Joe
1969	You Gave Me a Mountain

=== Singles ===
Year	Single	US Country	Album
1957	"One Step (Nearer to You)"	-	singles only
1958	"Teddy"	-	singles only
1959	"Nothin' but True Love"	25	singles only
1959	"The Eyes of Love"	12	20 Greatest Hits
1961	"Did I Ever Tell You" (with George Jones)	15	Duets Country Style
1962	"Waltz of the Angels" (with George Jones)	11	Duets Country Style
1963	"Magic Star"^{A}	—	singles only
1964	"Old Records"	11	singles only
1964	"Keeping Up with the Joneses" (with Faron Young)	5	Golden Hits
1964	"No Thanks, I Just Had One" (with Faron Young)	40	singles only
1964	"Another Woman's Man, Another Man's Woman" (with Faron Young)	38	singles only
1966	"How Can We Divide These Little Hearts" (with Leon Ashley)	—	singles only
1967	"Ode to Billie Joe"	39	A New Brand of Country
1967	"Hangin' On" (with Leon Ashley)	54	A New Brand of Country
1968	"Wandering Mind"	52	A New Brand of Country
1968	"You'll Never Be Lonely Again" (with Leon Ashley)	55	A New Brand of Country

- ^{A}"Magic Star" peaked at number 24 on the Bubbling Under Hot 100 Singles chart.
