= It's the Little Things =

Single by Sonny James

from the album Behind the Tear
- B-side: "Don't Cut Timber on a Windy Day"
- Released: August 1967
- Genre: Country
- Label: Capitol
- Songwriter(s): Arlie Duff
- Producer(s): Marvin Hughes

Sonny James singles chronology
"I'll Never Find Another You" (1967)	"It's the Little Things" (1967)	"A World of Our Own" (1968)

"It's the Little Things" is a 1967 single by Sonny James. "It's the Little Things" was Sonny James' twenty-fifth release on the country chart, the song went to number one on the country chart for five weeks and spent a total of fourteen weeks on the charts.

== Chart performance ==
Chart (1967)	Peak position
U.S. Billboard Hot Country Singles	1
Canadian RPM Country Tracks	2
