= Need You (Sonny James song) =

Single by Sonny James

from the album Need You
- B-side: "On and On"
- Released: January 1967
- Genre: Country
- Label: Capitol
- Songwriter(s): Johnny Blackburn; Lou Porter; Teepee Mitchell
- Producer(s): Marvin Hughes

Sonny James singles chronology
"Room in Your Heart" (1966)	"Need You" (1967)	"I'll Never Find Another You" (1967)

"Need You" is a 1967 single by Sonny James. The single went to number one on the Billboard Hot Country Singles chart where it spent two weeks at the top. "Need You" spent a total of seventeen weeks on the chart.

"Need You" is known as the song that began a string of 16 consecutive single releases that reached No. 1 on the Billboard Hot Country Singles chart without a miss. The string would continue into 1971, capped by the song "Here Comes Honey Again," the string finally being broken in 1972 with "Only Love Can Break a Heart." The string of 16 consecutive (non-holiday) single releases would be surpassed in 1985 by the country supergroup Alabama; the band would go on to have 21 No. 1 songs in a row, and to date is the only act to match James' record.

== Chart performance ==
Chart (1967)	Peak position
U.S. Billboard Hot Country Singles	1
