= All the Time (Kitty Wells song) =

1959 song first performed by Kitty Wells, becoming a hit for Jack Greene

Song
- Published: 1959
- Songwriters: Mel Tillis; Wayne P. Walker

"All the Time"

Single by Jack Greene

from the album All the Time
- B-side: "Wanting You But Never Having You"
- Released: April 1967
- Genre: Country
- Label: Decca
- Producer: Owen Bradley

Jack Greene singles chronology
"There Goes My Everything" (1966)	"All the Time" (1967)	"What Locks the Door" (1967)

"All the Time" is a song that has been recorded by many country music artists. The first version, by Kitty Wells, peaked at #18 on the country music charts in 1959. It was the b-side to her single "Mommy for a Day," which peaked at #5.

== Cover versions ==
- Eight years later, Jack Greene covered the song, taking his version to Number One on the same chart. The song "bubbled under" the Hot 100, peaking at No. 3. The song's B-side, "Wanting You but Never Having You," peaked at No. 63.
- Patti Page released the song as single with the B-side "Pretty Bluebird". It peaked at No. 23 on the Billboard Easy Listening chart. The song was later included on her album Today My Way (1967).
- Jimmy Roselli's more pop version reached number 19 on the Easy Listening chart in 1967. It also reached No. 7 on Cashbox's Looking Ahead chart. It was also included in his There Must Be a Way album.
- Wayne Newton released the song as a single in early 1968. It peaked at No. 26 on the Easy Listening chart and at No. 34 on Cashbox's Looking Ahead chart.
- Other artists who have released cover versions include Marion Worth, George Morgan, Eddy Arnold, Webb Pierce, Hank Snow, Johnny Paycheck, Charley Pride, Jean Shepard, Anne Murray, and Connie Smith.

== Chart performances ==
=== Kitty Wells ===
Chart (1959)	Peak position
U.S. Billboard Hot Country Singles	18

=== Jack Greene ===
Chart (1967)	Peak position
U.S. Billboard Hot Country Singles	1
U.S. Billboard Bubbling Under Hot 100	3

=== Patti Page ===
Chart (1967)	Peak position
U.S. Billboard Easy Listening	23

=== Jimmy Roselli ===
Chart (1967)	Peak position
U.S. Billboard Easy Listening	19
U.S. Cashbox Looking Ahead	7

=== Wayne Newton ===
Chart (1967)	Peak position
U.S. Billboard Easy Listening	26
U.S. Cashbox Looking Ahead	34
