= There Goes My Everything (song) =

1965 song by Dallas Frazier; first recorded by Ferlin Husky

Single by Jack Greene

from the album There Goes My Everything
- B-side: "The Hardest Easy Thing"
- Published: November 24, 1965 Acuff-Rose Publications Blue Crest Music, Inc., Husky Music, Inc.
- Released: October 1966
- Recorded: August 6, 1966
- Studio: RCA Victor, Nashville
- Genre: Country
- Label: Decca
- Songwriter: Dallas Frazier
- Producer: Owen Bradley

Jack Greene singles chronology
"Ever Since My Baby Went Away" (1966)	"There Goes My Everything" (1966)	"All the Time" (1967)

"There Goes My Everything" is a popular song written by Dallas Frazier and published in 1965. The song is now considered a country music standard, covered by many artists.

== Jack Greene recording ==
"There Goes My Everything" is best known in a 1966 version by Jack Greene. The version spent seven weeks at the top of the US country music chart, with a total of 21 weeks on the chart. It peaked at 65 on the Billboard Hot 100. It was Jack Greene's only crossover hit. The song also won several awards, including "Single of the Year" and "Song of the Year" at the first Country Music Association Awards presentation. In addition, the accompanying album of the same title won "Album of the Year", and Greene won "Male Vocalist of the Year".

== Content ==
The song is about a couple who are splitting up, but why is a mystery. The singer says that he can hear a voice refer to him as "darling", which seems an unlikely address when a couple are bitterly splitting up. The song describes the narrator's feelings as his lover is leaving him. He comes to realize how much she meant to him now that he is losing her – "There goes my reason for living/There goes the one of my dreams/There goes my only possession/There goes my everything".

== Chart performance ==
Chart (1966)	Peak position
US Hot Country Songs (Billboard)	1
U.S. Billboard Hot 100	65

== Cover versions ==
- In 1967, Engelbert Humperdinck hit number 20 on the Billboard Hot 100 with his version of the song. This version went to No. 2 on the UK Singles Chart, and number two in Ireland. It went to number 12 in New Zealand.
- In 1971, Elvis Presley hit the top 10 on the country charts with his version, which is also featured on the album Elvis Country (I'm 10,000 Years Old). Presley's version also reached number six in the UK chart.
