= Sonny James =

American country music singer-songwriter (1928–2016)

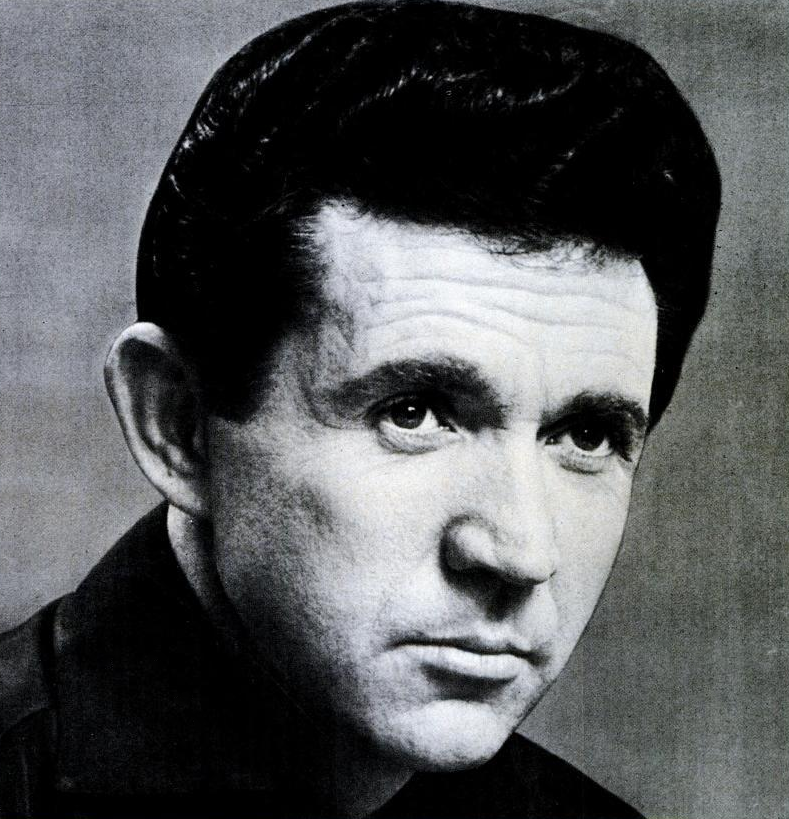
- James in 1967

Background information
- Also known as: Sonny James; The Southern Gentleman
- Born: James Hugh Loden; May 1, 1928
- Origin: Hackleburg, Alabama, U.S.
- Died: February 22, 2016 (aged 87) Nashville, Tennessee, U.S.
- Genres: Country, pop
- Occupation: Singer-songwriter
- Instruments: Vocals, guitar
- Years active: 1953–1983
- Labels: Capitol; Columbia; Dot; RCA; Monument; Dimension; Curb

James Hugh Loden (May 1, 1928 – February 22, 2016), known professionally as Sonny James, was an American country music singer and songwriter best known for his 1957 hit, "Young Love", topping both the Billboard Hot Country and Disk Jockey singles charts. Dubbed the "Southern Gentleman" for his congenial manner, his greatest success came from ballads about the trials of love. James had 72 country and pop charted releases from 1953 to 1983, including an unprecedented five-year streak of 16 straight Billboard Hot Country No. 1 singles among his 26 Billboard Hot Country No. 1 hits. From 1964 to 1976, James placed 21 of his albums in the Top 10 of Billboard Top Country Albums. James was given a star on the Hollywood Walk of Fame in 1961 and co-hosted the first Country Music Association Awards show in 1967. He was inducted into the Country Music Hall of Fame in 2007.

== Biography ==
=== Musical beginnings ===
James Hugh Loden was born on May 1, 1928 to Archie Lee "Pop" Loden and Della Burleson Loden, who operated a 300-acre (120 ha) farm outside Hackleburg, Alabama. His parents were amateur musicians, and his sister Thelma Lee Loden Holcombe also played instruments and sang from an early age. By age three, James was playing a mandolin and singing, and was dubbed "Sonny Boy". In 1933, the family appeared on a radio audition, which resulted in their being offered a regular Saturday slot on Muscle Shoals, Alabama, radio station WNRA. About this time, his parents volunteered to raise an Alabama girl named Ruby Palmer, who soon became part of the family musical group, known as the Loden Family. Later billed as Sonny Loden and the Southerners, the group played theaters, auditoriums, and schoolhouses throughout the Southern United States.

Up to this point, their musical appearances had been a part-time effort for the family, as they returned after each gig or tour to work the family farm. After a few years, Pop Loden decided they were professional enough to immerse themselves in the field full-time, so he leased out the farm and they took a daily spot on radio station KLCN, where they provided early-morning accompaniment for the area's early risers. After that, they had spots on several other radio stations around the South. In 1949, they returned to Alabama with a show on radio station WSGN in Birmingham, Alabama. Near Christmastime that year, the two girls were married in West Memphis, Arkansas, in a double ceremony and left the group. The parents found other girls to take their places, but the group soon disbanded. James's parents returned to Hackleburg and opened a clothing store, where James worked while belatedly finishing his final year of high school. During the summer of 1950, he worked with a band, sometimes singing, but he was most useful as a guitar player on the Memphis, Tennessee radio station WHBQ.

On September 9, 1950, his career was interrupted by the Korean War when his Alabama Army National Guard unit was activated. After military service in Korea, James moved to Nashville, where he spent a week staying with Chet Atkins and his wife. He had roomed with Atkins years earlier in Raleigh, North Carolina, when they were playing at the same radio station. Atkins invited Capitol Records executive Ken Nelson to join them for dinner. James stated, "After dinner, Chet and I began woodshedding on our guitars. We played a few songs I had written, then Chet turned to Ken and said, 'What do you think, Ken?' And Ken said, 'I'd like to record him.'" Nelson asked him to drop his last name professionally, believing already several musicians were named Loden, Louden, or Luden, and that "James" would be easier to remember: "The smallest children can remember Sonny James." So, he released his first studio record as Sonny James. While appearing on Louisiana Hayride, he met musician Slim Whitman. James's performance on stage playing a fiddle and singing brought a strong crowd response, and Whitman invited him to front for his new touring band. James stayed with Whitman's group for only two months, when Whitman felt he had to do some club work to keep up his income to be able to pay his band. The Loden family had only appeared in schoolhouses and such, and Sonny agreed to stay on for a few shows until Whitman could find his replacement. For the remainder of his career, he never played a club performance. Over the next few years, James had several songs that did reasonably well on the country music charts, and he continued to develop his career with performances at live country music shows. He also appeared on radio, including Big D Jamboree, before moving to the all-important new medium of television, where he became a regular performer on ABC's Ozark Jubilee in Springfield, Missouri, beginning in October 1955.

Following his long streak of No. 1 hits, James is also remembered for his 1975 No. 6 song, "A Little Bit South of Saskatoon", that was in the 1977 Paul Newman hockey comedy Slap Shot.

=== Top of the charts ===
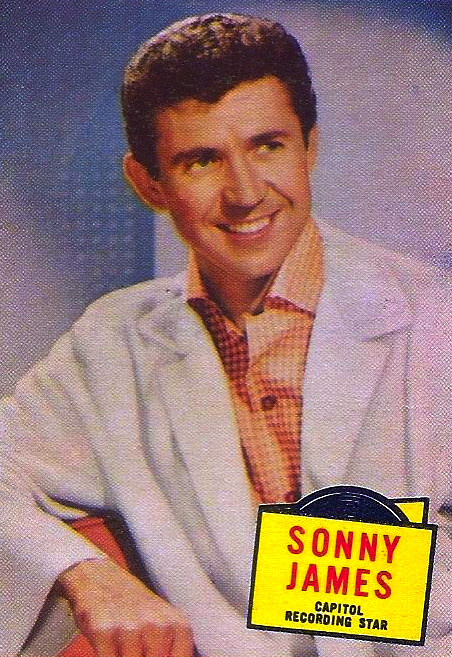
James in 1957

In late 1956, James released the 45 rpm single" Young Love". As the first teenaged country crossover single, it topped both the US country and pop music charts in January and February 1957. Record sales could have been higher if Capitol Records had anticipated the exposure on popular-music charts; they had ordered only enough copies of the record to satisfy the anticipated country-music demand, and were therefore unable to supply most of the requests for records. The track peaked at number 11 in the UK Singles Chart. It sold well over one million copies, and was awarded a gold disc. Dubbed the Southern Gentleman because of his polite demeanor, he gained more exposure with an appearance on the popular Ed Sullivan Show and the Bob Hope Show.

Thus began a seven-year search for a sound that gave him a lasting career. Two more years at Capitol Records did not produce it, and they parted ways in 1959. James signed with National Recording Corporation, and then stints with Dot (1960–1961), RCA (1961–1962), his second time with Capitol (1963–1972), and later with Columbia (1972–1979), Monument (1979), and Dimension (1981–1983).

In 1962, he returned to his roots and became a member of the Grand Ole Opry, and a year later signed again with Capitol Records. From 1964 to 1972, he was a dominant force in country music. James and his Southern Gentlemen appeared on the major TV shows during that period, including Ed Sullivan, Andy Williams, Glen Campbell, Jimmy Dean, Mike Douglas, Merv Griffin, and the Joey Bishop Show, and was a guest on Hee Haw several times; he also appeared on the Johnny Cash Show and made minor singing appearances in four motion pictures.

=== More success ===
On August 15, 1964, James made his first appearance with a vocal group that had been together for five years. The group consisted of Lin Bown/first tenor, Gary Robble/second tenor, Duane West/baritone, and Glenn Huggins/bass. These four young men had started singing as freshmen at Eastern Nazarene College in Quincy, Massachusetts, in 1959, and in September 1962 they transferred to a sister college in Nashville, Tennessee. Sixteen months later in January 1964, they replaced the Jordanaires as the Grand Ole Opry quartet. James felt he had found the combination that propelled him into his second career – that sound he had been seeking for seven years. So these 21- and 22-year-old men, along with James's multitalented bass player Milo Liggett, became the Southern Gentlemen and joined 36-year-old Sonny James.

Two months later, James had his first No. 1 Billboard hit since "Young Love", topping the country charts with the song he co-wrote with Bob Tubert, "You're the Only World I Know". His next five releases peaked on the Billboard country charts at Nos. 2, 1, 3, 1, and 2 – although all five of them hit No. 1 on either Billboard, Record World, or Cashbox.

=== Billboard number-one streak ===
Beginning in 1967 with "Need You" and ending with "Here Comes Honey Again" in 1971, James recorded 16 straight No. 1 country singles. His career No. 1 total is 26, the last coming with 1974's "Is It Wrong (For Loving You)". During his career, James had 72 charted releases.

In 1973, James also helped launch the solo career of Marie Osmond, producing and arranging her first three albums, including her smash hit, "Paper Roses".

=== Personal life and death ===
In July 1957, Sonny married Doris Shrode in Dallas, Texas.

In the spring of 1984, Sonny and Doris quietly retired to their home in Nashville, Tennessee. He came home to Hackleburg during the first annual Neighbor Day Festival on April 20, 2002, and continued attending the festival every other year. During the April 25, 2009, festival, he recognized the 100th birthday of the town of Hackleburg on the main stage.

James died on February 22, 2016, in Nashville at the age of 87. He died of natural causes at Nashville's Alive Hospice, according to a statement on his official website. He is buried at Cedar Tree Cemetery, in Hackleburg, Alabama.

== Recognition ==
In 1956, as rock and roll was just beginning, James's multimillion selling single "Young Love" became a No. 1 country and pop hit, one of the first such crossover hits by a country artist.

In 1957, James became the first country recording artist to appear on The Ed Sullivan Show.

In 1961, honoring his contribution to the music industry, James was honored with a star on the Hollywood Walk of Fame at 6630 Hollywood Blvd. He was the first country music star to receive this honor, as well as being the only person to get a star on the Hollywood Walk of Fame in 1961, as well as the last person to get one until 1968.

In 1967, along with Bobbie Gentry, James hosted the first Country Music Association Awards show.

From 1969 through 1971, James became the first country artist to achieve a feat previously not done in the country music industry. In the middle of his highly successful run of 16 consecutive No. 1 hits, of the next seven singles that James released, five had previously been moderately successful releases for soulful R&B artists Ivory Joe Hunter, Brook Benton and Clyde Otis, and Jimmy Reed. Those five songs were "Since I Met You Baby", "It's Just a Matter of Time", "Endlessly", "Empty Arms", and "Bright Lights, Big City", all of which hit No. 1 on the Billboard country charts.

In 1969, Billboard named Sonny James as Country Music's Artist of the Year.

In February 1971, James was the first country artist whose music went into space; he made a special music recording for the crew of Apollo 14. They later presented him with one of the small American flags that they had carried to the Moon.

In 1973, James produced Marie Osmond's first three albums. The first single, "Paper Roses", reached No. 1 on the Billboard Hot Country Songs chart less than one month after her 14th birthday. Osmond thus became the youngest female and overall youngest solo artist to ever reach the No. 1 position on that chart, a record that still stands as of 2025.

In 1987, James was inducted into the Alabama Music Hall of Fame.

In June 2001, he was honored with the Male Golden Voice Award. In November 2001, he received the Master Achievement Award / R.O.P.E. Award. In June 2002, he was honored by the Country Music DJ Hall of Fame and Country Radio Broadcasters with the Career Achievement Award.

On November 6, 2006, he appeared on television for the first time in nearly 20 years, when presenter Kris Kristofferson announced on the ABC's Country Music Association Awards that James was to be one of its newest inductees into the Country Music Hall of Fame. This is considered by many to be one of the highest honors in the career of a country music artist. James's acceptance speech opened with the words, "I want to thank my Good Lord for the career He has given me."

In May 2007, Sonny James and his Southern Gentlemen were officially inducted into the Country Music Hall of Fame and Museum.

In 2009, James was inducted into the Hit Parade Hall of Fame.

On August 15, 2015, exactly 51 years to the day when he first teamed up with the Southern Gentlemen in 1964, James was inducted into the Birmingham Record Collectors Hall of Fame. Gary Robble, one of The Southern Gentlemen, accepted the award on behalf of James and all of The Southern Gentlemen.
