= Tom T. Hall discography =

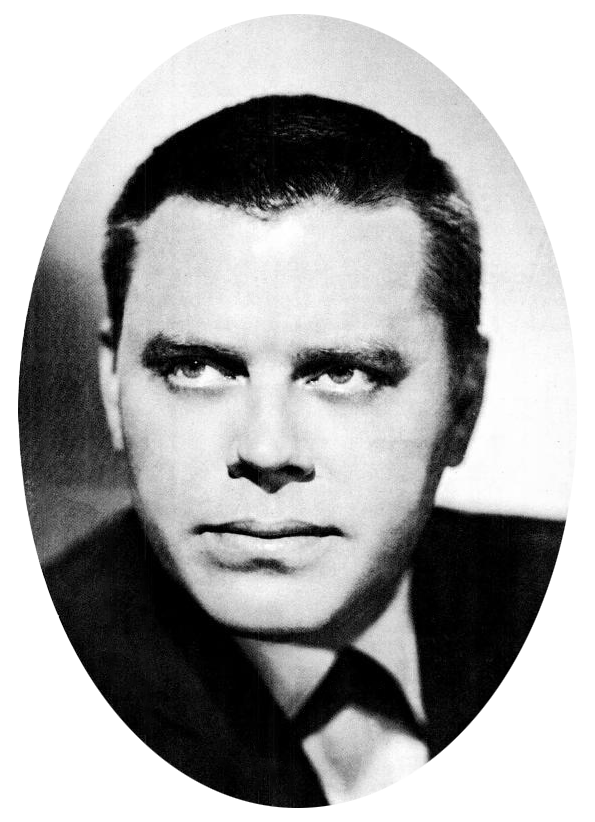
- Tom T. Hall in 1967
- Studio albums: 35
- Compilation albums: 9
- Singles: 50
- No. 1 Singles: 8

The discography for American country music singer Tom T. Hall consists of 35 studio albums, nine compilation albums. and 50 singles.

== Studio albums ==
=== 1960s–1970s ===
Title	Details	Peak chart positions			
Title	Details	US Country	US	AUS	CAN Country
Ballad of Forty Dollars	Release date: 1969; Label: Mercury Records	—	—	—	—
Homecoming	Release date: 1969; Label: Mercury Records	23	—	—	—
I Witness Life	Release date: 1970; Label: Mercury Records	40	—	—	—
One Hundred Children	Release date: 1970; Label: Mercury Records	31	—	—	—
In Search of a Song	Release date: 1971; Label: Mercury Records	8	137	—	—
We All Got Together and...	Release date: 1972; Label: Mercury Records	12	—	—	—
The Storyteller	Release date: 1972; Label: Mercury Records	8	—	26	—
Rhymer and Other Five and Dimers	Release date: 1973; Label: Mercury Records	1	181	30	—
For the People in the Last Hard Town	Release date: 1973; Label: Mercury Records	3	149	—	—
Country Is	Release date: 1974; Label: Mercury Records	7	—	91	—
Songs of Fox Hollow	Release date: 1974; Label: Mercury Records	3	180	—	—
I Wrote a Song About It	Release date: 1975; Label: Mercury Records	28	—	—	—
Faster Horses	Release date: 1976; Label: Mercury Records	3	—	—	—
The Magnificent Music Machine	Release date: 1976; Label: Mercury Records	11	—	—	—
About Love	Release date: 1977; Label: Mercury Records	20	—	—	—
New Train, Same Rider	Release date: 1978; Label: RCA Records	37	—	—	—
Places I've Done Time	Release date: 1978; Label: RCA Records	19	—	—	17
Saturday Morning Songs/The “is” Songs	Release date: 1979; Label: RCA Records	—	—	—	—
Ol’ T’s in Town	Release date: 1979; Label: RCA Records	20	—	—	5
"—" denotes releases that did not chart

=== 1980s–2021 ===
Title	Details	Peak positions
Title	Details	US Country
A Soldier of Fortune	Release date: 1980; Label: RCA Records	—
The Storyteller and the Banjo Man (with Earl Scruggs)	Release date: 1982; Label: Columbia Records	—
Everything from Jesus to Jack Daniels	Release date: 1983; Label: Mercury Records	—
Natural Dreams	Release date: 1984; Label: Mercury Records	43
Song in a Seashell	Release date: 1985; Label: Mercury Records	63
Country Songs for Kids	Release date: 1989; Label: Mercury Records	—
Songs from Sopchoppy	Release date: 1996; Label: Mercury Records	—
Home Grown	Release date: 1997; Label: Mercury Records	—
Tom T. Hall Sings Miss Dixie and Tom T.	Release date: 2007; Label: Blue Circle Records	—
"—" denotes releases that did not chart

== Compilation albums ==
Title	Details	Peak positions	Certifications (sales threshold)
Title	Details	US Country	Certifications (sales threshold)
Tom T. Hall's Greatest Hits	Release date: 1972; Label: Mercury Records	20	
Greatest Hits Vol. 2	Release date: 1975; Label: Mercury Records	12	US: Gold
Greatest Hits Vol. 3	Release date: 1978; Label: Mercury Records	—	
Country	Release date: 1984; Label: Range Records	—	
The Essential Tom T. Hall	Release date: 1988; Label: Mercury Records	—	
Storyteller, Poet, Philosopher	Release date: 1995; Label: Mercury Records	—	
Loves Lost and Found	Release date: 1995; Label: Mercury Records	—	
Country Songs for Children	Release date: 1995; Label: Mercury Records	—	
20th Century Masters— The Millennium Collection	Release date: 2000; Label: MCA Nashville	—	
"—" denotes releases that did not chart

== Singles ==
=== 1960s ===
Year	Single	Peak chart positions		Album
Year	Single	US Country	CAN Country	Album
1967	"I Washed My Face in the Morning Dew"	30	—	Ballad of Forty Dollars
1968	"The World the Way I Want It"	66	—	Ballad of Forty Dollars
1968	"Ain't Got the Time"	68	—	Ballad of Forty Dollars
1968	"Ballad of Forty Dollars"	4	4	Ballad of Forty Dollars
1969	"Strawberry Farms"	40	—	Homecoming
1969	"Homecoming"	5	—	Homecoming
1969	"A Week in a Country Jail"	1	32	Homecoming
"—" denotes releases that did not chart

=== 1970s ===
Year	Single	Peak chart positions					Album
Year	Single	US Country	US	CAN Country	CAN	AUS	Album
1970	"Shoeshine Man"	8	—	10	—	—	Homecoming
1970	"Salute to a Switchblade"	8	—	14	—	—	I Witness Life
1970	"Day Drinkin'" (with Dave Dudley)	23	—	20	—	—	—N/a
1970	"One Hundred Children"	14	—	11	—	—	One Hundred Children
1971	"Ode to Half a Pound of Ground Round"	21	—	18	—	—	One Hundred Children
1971	"The Year That Clayton Delaney Died"	1	42	6	42	—	In Search of a Song
1972	"Me and Jesus"	8	98	4	—	—	We All Got Together and...
1972	"The Monkey That Became President"	11	—	9	—	—	We All Got Together and...
1972	"Pamela Brown"	—	—	—	—	24	We All Got Together and...
1972	"More About John Henry"	26	—	14	—	—	The Storyteller
1972	"(Old Dogs, Children And) Watermelon Wine"	1	—	1	—	20	The Storyteller
1972	"Hello, We're Lonely" (with Patti Page)	14	—	20	—	—	—N/a
1973	"Ravishing Ruby"	3	—	1	—	80	Rhymer and Other Five and Dimers
1973	"Watergate Blues"	16	101	20	—	—	Rhymer and Other Five and Dimers
1973	"I Love"^{[A]}	1	12	1	13	28	For the People in the Last Hard Town
1974	"That Song Is Driving Me Crazy"	2	63	2	58	54	Country Is
1974	"Country Is"	1	—	1	—	—	Country Is
1974	"I Care"	1	—	6	—	—	Songs of Fox Hollow
1975	"Deal"	8	—	8	—	—	I Wrote a Song About it
1975	"I Like Beer"	4	—	12	—	70	I Wrote a Song About it
1975	"Faster Horses (The Cowboy and the Poet)"	1	—	2	—	—	Faster Horses
1976	"Negatory Romance"	24	—	17	—	—	Faster Horses
1976	"Fox on the Run"	9	—	12	—	—	Magnificent Music Machine
1977	"Your Man Loves You Honey"	4	—	11	—	—	About Love
1977	"It's All in the Game"	12	—	8	—	—	About Love
1977	"May the Force Be with You Always"	13	—	5	—	—	New Train Same Rider
1978	"I Wish I Loved Somebody Else"	13	—	29	—	—	New Train Same Rider
1978	"What Have You Got to Lose"	9	—	14	—	—	Places I've Done Time
1979	"Son of Clayton Delaney"	14	—	18	—	—	Places I've Done Time
1979	"There Is a Miracle in You"	20	—	21	—	—	Saturday Morning Songs
1979	"You Show Me Your Heart (And I'll Show You Mine)"	11	—	26	—	—	Ol'T's in Town
"—" denotes releases that did not chart

=== 1980s ===
Year	Single	Peak chart positions		Album
Year	Single	US Country	CAN Country	Album
1980	"The Old Side of Town"	9	9	Ol'T's in Town
1980	"Soldier of Fortune"	51	—	Soldier of Fortune
1980	"Back When Gas Was Thirty Cents a Gallon"	36	—	Soldier of Fortune
1981	"The All New Me"	41	—	World Class Country
1982	"There Ain't No Country Music on This Jukebox" (with Earl Scruggs)	77	—	Storyteller and the Banjo Man
1982	"Song of the South" (with Earl Scruggs)	72	—	Storyteller and the Banjo Man
1983	"Everything from Jesus to Jack Daniels"	42	—	Everything from Jesus to Jack Daniels
1984	"Famous in Missouri"	81	—	Natural Dreams
1984	"P.S. I Love You"	8	5	Natural Dreams
1985	"A Bar with No Beer"	40	—	Song in a Seashell
1985	"Down in the Florida Keys"	42	—	Song in a Seashell
1986	"Love Letters in the Sand"	79	—	Song in a Seashell
1986	"Down at the Mall"	65	—	—N/a
"—" denotes releases that did not chart

=== Music videos ===
Year	Video
1973	"I Love"
1996	"Shoes And Dress That Alice Wore"

== B-sides ==
Year	B-Side	Peak chart positions			Original A-Side
Year	B-Side	US Country	US	AUS	Original A-Side
1972	"Pamela Brown"	—	—	24	"The Monkey That Became President"
1973	"Spokane Motel Blues"	flip	—	—	"Watergate Blues"
1974	"Sneaky Snake"	69	55	—	"I Care"
1980	"Jesus on the Radio (Daddy on the Phone)"	flip	—	—	"The Old Side of Town"
1986	"Susie's Beauty Shop"	52	—	—	"Love Letters in the Sand"
"—" denotes releases that did not chart

== Notes ==
- A "I Love" also peaked at number 2 on the Billboard Hot Adult Contemporary Tracks chart and number 7 on the RPM Adult Contemporary Tracks chart in Canada.

== See also ==
- Category:Songs written by Tom T. Hall
