= List of Hot Country Singles number ones of 1970 =

Merle Haggard topped the chart with one of his best-known songs, "The Fightin' Side of Me".

Hot Country Songs is a chart that ranks the top-performing country music songs in the United States, published by Billboard magazine. In 1970, 23 different singles topped the chart, which was published at this time under the title Hot Country Singles, in 52 issues of the magazine, based on playlists submitted by country music radio stations and sales reports supplied by stores.

In the issue of Billboard dated January 3, 1970, "Baby, Baby (I Know You're a Lady)" by David Houston replaced the final chart-topper of 1969, Charley Pride's "(I'm So) Afraid of Losing You Again" at number one. Houston's single held the top spot until the January 31 issue, when it was replaced by Tom T. Hall's song "A Week in a Country Jail". Hall had achieved success as a songwriter, including penning the song "Harper Valley PTA" which had been both a pop and country number one for Jeannie C. Riley in 1968, but "A Week in a Country Jail" was his first number one as a performer. Hall also wrote "The Pool Shark", which gave Dave Dudley his one and only week at number one. Husband-and-wife duo Jack Blanchard & Misty Morgan also reached number one for the first and only time with "Tennessee Bird Walk". Lynn Anderson topped the chart for the first time with "Rose Garden", which was also a major crossover hit, reaching the top five of Billboard's all-genres chart, the Hot 100. Hank Williams Jr., the son of one of the most influential country singers of all time, Hank Williams, achieved the first number one of a career which would go on to span more than fifty years when he collaborated with the Mike Curb Congregation on the single "All for the Love of Sunshine".

Sonny James spent the most weeks at number one of any artist, his four chart-toppers totalling fourteen weeks in the top spot. "It's Just a Matter of Time", "My Love", "Don't Keep Me Hangin' On" and "Endlessly" formed part of a streak of sixteen consecutive number ones for James, which ran from 1967 until 1971. Three other artists took multiple singles to number one during 1970. Charley Pride had three chart-toppers totalling six weeks at number one, the highest total after the fourteen achieved by James, and Conway Twitty and Tammy Wynette each achieved two number ones. Twitty and his frequent duet partner Loretta Lynn both reached number one in 1970 with tracks which came to be regarded as their respective signature songs: "Hello Darlin'" and the autobiographical "Coal Miner's Daughter". The final number one of the year was "Rose Garden" by Lynn Anderson, which began a run atop the chart in the issue of Billboard dated December 26 which would last until the issue dated January 30, 1971.

== Chart history ==
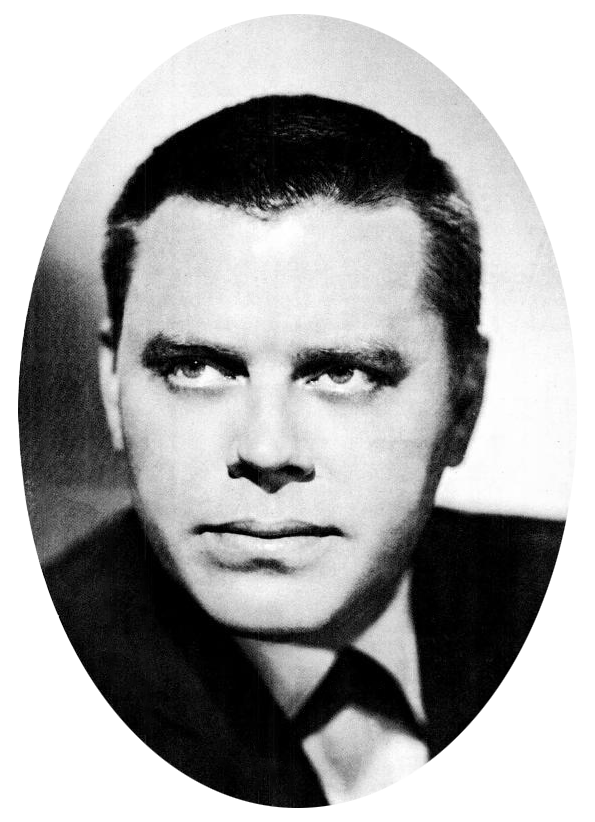
Tom T. Hall had his first number one in 1970 with "A Week in a Country Jail".

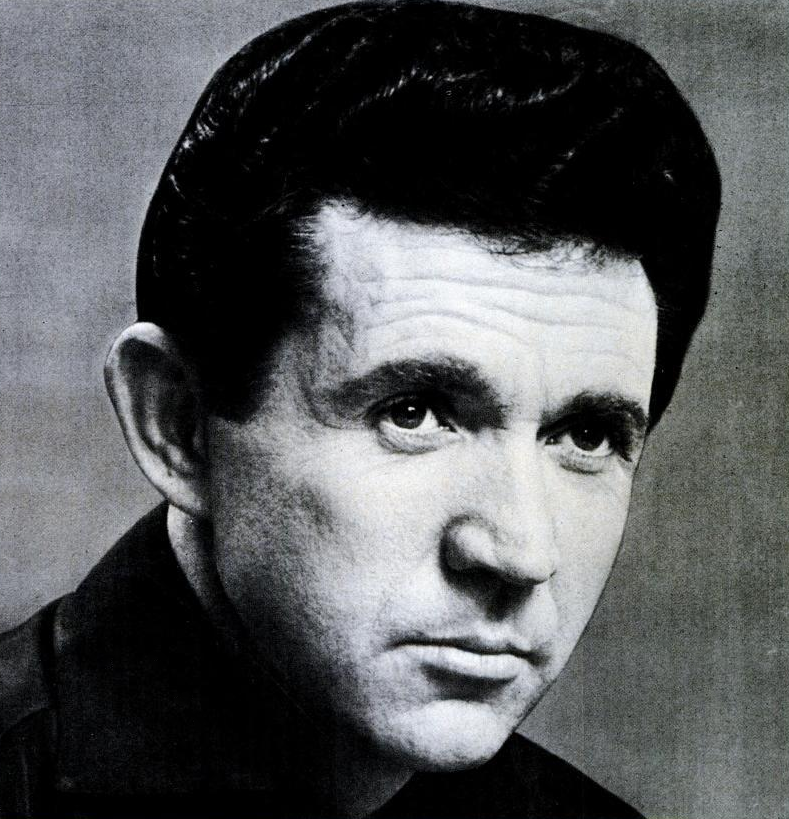
Sonny James spent fourteen weeks at number one during the year.

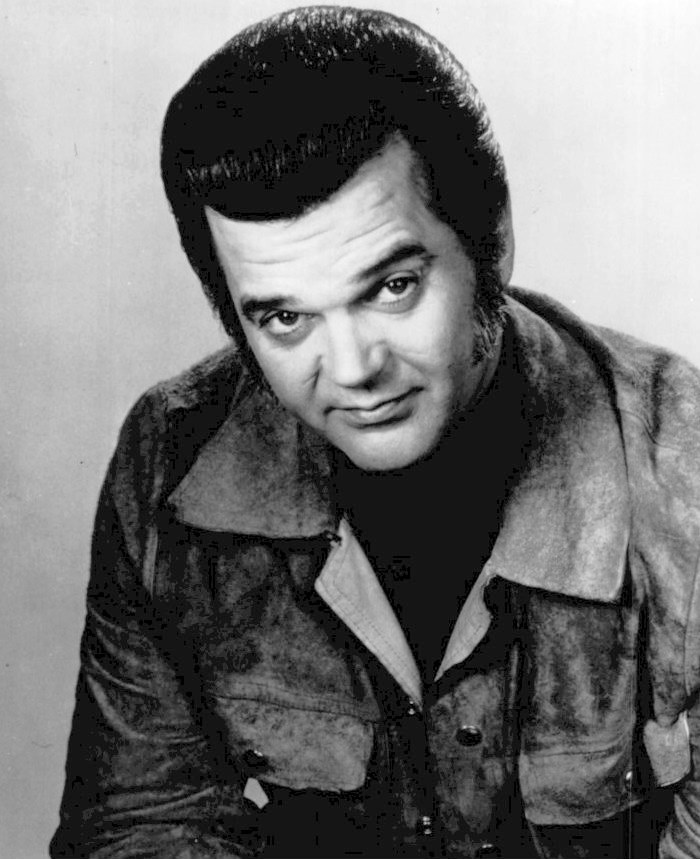
Conway Twitty topped the chart with "Hello Darlin'", which came to be regarded as his signature song.

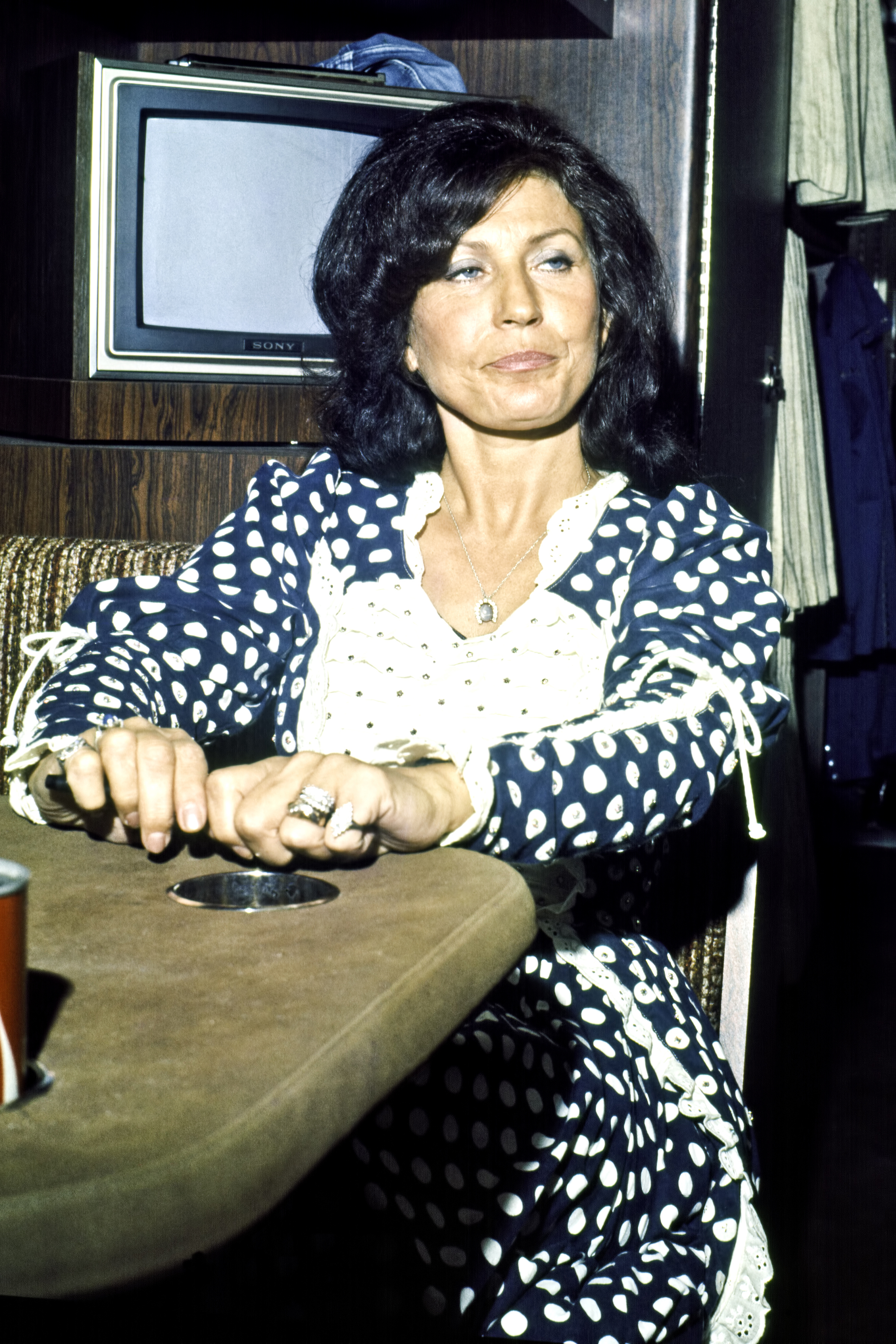
Loretta Lynn reached number one with the autobiographical "Coal Miner's Daughter".

Issue date	Title	Artist(s)	Ref.
January 3	"Baby, Baby (I Know You're a Lady)"	David Houston	
January 10	"Baby, Baby (I Know You're a Lady)"	David Houston	
January 17	"Baby, Baby (I Know You're a Lady)"	David Houston	
January 24	"Baby, Baby (I Know You're a Lady)"	David Houston	
January 31	"A Week in a Country Jail"	Tom T. Hall	
February 7	"A Week in a Country Jail"	Tom T. Hall	
February 14	"It's Just a Matter of Time"	Sonny James	
February 21	"It's Just a Matter of Time"	Sonny James	
February 28	"It's Just a Matter of Time"	Sonny James	
March 7	"It's Just a Matter of Time"	Sonny James	
March 14	"The Fightin' Side of Me"	Merle Haggard	
March 21	"The Fightin' Side of Me"	Merle Haggard	
March 28	"The Fightin' Side of Me"	Merle Haggard	
April 4	"Tennessee Bird Walk"	Jack Blanchard & Misty Morgan	
April 11	"Tennessee Bird Walk"	Jack Blanchard & Misty Morgan	
April 18	"Is Anybody Goin' to San Antone"	Charley Pride	
April 25	"Is Anybody Goin' to San Antone"	Charley Pride	
May 2	"My Woman, My Woman, My Wife"	Marty Robbins	
May 9	"The Pool Shark"	Dave Dudley	
May 16	"My Love"	Sonny James	
May 23	"My Love"	Sonny James	
May 30	"My Love"	Sonny James	
June 6	"Hello Darlin'"	Conway Twitty	
June 13	"Hello Darlin'"	Conway Twitty	
June 20	"Hello Darlin'"	Conway Twitty	
June 27	"Hello Darlin'"	Conway Twitty	
July 4	"He Loves Me All the Way"	Tammy Wynette	
July 11	"He Loves Me All the Way"	Tammy Wynette	
July 18	"He Loves Me All the Way"	Tammy Wynette	
July 25	"Wonder Could I Live There Anymore"	Charley Pride	
August 1	"Wonder Could I Live There Anymore"	Charley Pride	
August 8	"Don't Keep Me Hangin' On"	Sonny James	
August 15	"Don't Keep Me Hangin' On"	Sonny James	
August 22	"Don't Keep Me Hangin' On"	Sonny James	
August 29	"Don't Keep Me Hangin' On"	Sonny James	
September 5	"All for the Love of Sunshine"	Hank Williams Jr. with the Mike Curb Congregation	
September 12	"All for the Love of Sunshine"	Hank Williams Jr. with the Mike Curb Congregation	
September 19	"For the Good Times"	Ray Price	
September 26	"There Must Be More to Love Than This"	Jerry Lee Lewis	
October 3	"There Must Be More to Love Than This"	Jerry Lee Lewis	
October 10	"Sunday Mornin' Comin' Down"	Johnny Cash	
October 17	"Sunday Mornin' Comin' Down"	Johnny Cash	
October 24	"Run, Woman, Run"	Tammy Wynette	
October 31	"Run, Woman, Run"	Tammy Wynette	
November 7	"I Can't Believe That You've Stopped Loving Me"	Charley Pride	
November 14	"I Can't Believe That You've Stopped Loving Me"	Charley Pride	
November 21	"Fifteen Years Ago"	Conway Twitty	
November 28	"Endlessly"	Sonny James	
December 5	"Endlessly"	Sonny James	
December 12	"Endlessly"	Sonny James	
December 19	"Coal Miner's Daughter"	Loretta Lynn	
December 26	"Rose Garden"	Lynn Anderson	

== See also ==
- 1970 in music
- List of artists who reached number one on the U.S. country chart
