= Greatest Hits Vol. 2 (Tom T. Hall album) =

Compilation album by Tom T. Hall
- Released: 1975
- Genre: Country
- Length: 28:48
- Label: Mercury
- Producer: Jerry Kennedy

Tom T. Hall chronology
I Wrote a Song About It (1975)	Greatest Hits Vol. 2 (1975)	Faster Horses (1977)

Professional ratings
Review scores
Source	Rating
Christgau's Record Guide	D+

Greatest Hits Vol. 2 is the second compilation album by American country music singer Tom T. Hall released by Mercury in 1975. It reached #12 in the US country charts and was certified Gold by the RIAA.

== Track listing ==
All tracks written by Tom T. Hall

Side 1

1. "Country Is" - 2:09
2. "I Love" – 2:06
3. "The Little Lady Preacher" - 2:53
4. "Sneaky Snake" – 1:57
5. "I Like Beer" 2:52
6. "Ravishing Ruby" 2:28

Side 2

1. "(Old Dogs, Children and) Watermelon Wine" – 4:09
2. "Deal" – 2:30
3. "Who's Gonna Feed Them Hogs" – 2:35
4. "That Song Is Driving Me Crazy" – 3:08
5. "I Care" – 2:01

== Personnel ==
- Strings and Horn arrangements by Cam Mullins
- Vocal accompaniment by The Irwin Steinberg Aggregation

== Production ==
- Recorded at Mercury Custom Recording Studio, Nashville, Tennessee
- Producer: Jerry Kennedy
- Engineer: Tom Sparkman except “Sneaky Snake” and “I Care” engineered by Larry Rogers
- Album photography: Ed Caraeff (at Fox Hollow, Franklin, Tennessee)
- Album art direction: Jim Schubert
- Album design: Joe Kotleba
