= Touching Home =

Touching Home may refer to:

- Touching Home (film), a 2008 American drama film
- Touching Home (album), a 1971 album by Jerry Lee Lewis
- "Touching Home" (song), a 1971 single by Jerry Lee Lewis
