= There Must Be More to Love Than This =

There Must Be More to Love Than This may refer to:

- There Must Be More to Love Than This (song), a 1970 single by Jerry Lee Lewis
- There Must Be More to Love Than This (album), a 1971 album by Jerry Lee Lewis
