= Salute to a Switchblade =

Single by Tom T. Hall

from the album I Witness Life
- B-side: "That'll Be All Right With Me"
- Released: June 15, 1970
- Recorded: February 2, 1970
- Studio: Monument Recording, Nashville, Tennessee
- Genre: Country
- Length: 3:23
- Label: Mercury 73078
- Songwriter: Tom T. Hall
- Producer: Jerry Kennedy

Tom T. Hall singles chronology
"Shoeshine Man" (1970)	"Salute to a Switchblade" (1970)	""Day Drinkin'" (with Dave Dudley)" (1978)

"Salute to a Switchblade" is a song written and recorded by American country music artist Tom T. Hall. It was released in June 1970 as the only single from the album I Witness Life. The song peaked at number 8 on the U.S. country singles chart and at number 14 on the Canadian country singles chart.

== Chart performance ==
Chart (1970)	Peak position
US Hot Country Songs (Billboard)	8
Canadian RPM Country Tracks	14
