= The Monkey That Became President =

Single by Tom T. Hall

from the album We All Got Together and...
- B-side: "Pamela Brown"
- Released: June 19, 1972
- Recorded: December 21, 1971; Mercury Custom Recording Studio, Nashville, Tennessee
- Genre: Country
- Length: 3:00
- Label: Mercury 73297
- Songwriter(s): Tom T. Hall
- Producer(s): Jerry Kennedy

Tom T. Hall singles chronology
"Me and Jesus" (1972)	"The Monkey That Became President" (1972)	"More About John Henry" (1972)

"The Monkey That Became President" is a song written and recorded by the American country music artist Tom T. Hall. It was released in June 1972 as the second and final single from the album, We All Got Together and.... The song peaked at number 11 on the U.S. country singles chart and at number 9 on the Canadian country singles chart.

== Content ==
The narrator pokes fun at government by showing that a monkey can perform duties better than politicians.

== Chart performance ==
Chart (1972)	Peak position
US Hot Country Songs (Billboard)	11
Canadian RPM Country Tracks	9
