= Your Man Loves You Honey =

Single by Tom T. Hall

from the album About Love
- B-side: "One of the Mysteries of Life"
- Released: April 4, 1977
- Genre: Country
- Length: 2:16
- Label: Mercury
- Songwriter(s): Tom T. Hall
- Producer(s): Jerry Kennedy

Tom T. Hall singles chronology
"Fox on the Run" (1976)	"Your Man Loves You Honey" (1977)	"It's All in the Game" (1977)

"Your Man Loves You Honey" is a song written and recorded by American country music artist Tom T. Hall. It was released in April 1977 as the lead single from the album, About Love. The song peaked at number four on the U.S. country singles chart and at number 11 on the Canadian country singles chart.

== Chart performance ==
Chart (1977)	Peak position
U.S. Billboard Hot Country Singles	4
Canadian RPM Country Tracks	11
