= Chantilly Lace (song) =

1958 single by the Big Bopper

Single by The Big Bopper

from the album Chantilly Lace
- B-side: "The Purple People Eater Meets the Witch Doctor"
- Released: August 1958
- Studio: Gold Star (Houston, Texas)
- Genre: Rock and roll
- Length: 2:20
- Label: Mercury
- Songwriter: J.P. Richardson
- Producer: Jerry Kennedy

The Big Bopper singles chronology
"Chantilly Lace" (1958)	"Little Red Riding Hood" (1958)

"Chantilly Lace" is a 1958 rock and roll song by The Big Bopper. It was produced by Jerry Kennedy, and reached No. 6 on the US Billboard Hot 100. Bruce Channel covered the song on his 1962 album, Hey! Baby. The song was also covered by Jerry Lee Lewis in 1972.

== History ==
The song was recorded at the Gold Star Studios in Houston, Texas. Originally cut for Pappy Daily's D Records label, the recording was purchased by Mercury Records and reissued in the summer of 1958, just over six months after Chuck Berry released "Sweet Little Sixteen", which uses the same chord progression.

The song was originally released as the flip side to "The Purple People Eater Meets The Witch Doctor", which parodied "The Purple People Eater" by Sheb Wooley and "Witch Doctor" by David Seville. This was J. P. Richardson's first release under the moniker The Big Bopper. However, DJs and the public preferred the flip side "Chantilly Lace", and it was this song that became a hit.

The song reached No. 6 on the Billboard Hot 100 and spent 22 weeks on the national Top 40. It was the third most played song of 1958. On the Cash Box chart, "Chantilly Lace" reached No. 4.

== Lyrics ==
The song depicts a young man flirting with his girlfriend on the telephone and listing things about her that he likes, including:

Chantilly lace and a pretty face
And a ponytail hangin' down
A wiggle in her walk and a giggle in her talk
Make the world go 'round.

== Charts ==
Chart (1958)	Peak position
Canada (CHUM Hit Parade)	2
UK Singles (Official Charts)	12
US Billboard Hot 100	6
US Cash Box Top 100	4

== Jerry Lee Lewis version ==
"Chantilly Lace"

Single by Jerry Lee Lewis

from the album The Killer Rocks On
- B-side: "Think About It Darlin'"
- Released: February 1972
- Recorded: January 13, 1972
- Length: 2:50
- Label: Mercury
- Songwriter: J.P. Richardson

In January 1972, Jerry Lee Lewis recorded a version of "Chantilly Lace" at the Mercury studio in Nashville. The recording was done with everyone (10 musicians and 6 backing singers) crowded into the studio as Lewis did not want any overdubbing on the record. The single (with B-side "Think About It Darlin'") was released six weeks after it was recorded. It was for three weeks a No. 1 hit on the Billboard Hot Country Singles chart and a top fifty pop hit in the United States and a Top 40 pop hit in the UK. The song was included in the album The Killer Rocks On

=== Charts ===
Chart (1972)	Peak position
Belgium (Ultratop 50 Flanders)	18
Belgium (Ultratop 50 Wallonia)	50
Canada Top Singles (RPM)	59
Canada Country Singles (RPM)	1
Netherlands (Single Top 100)	15
UK Singles (Official Charts)	33
US Billboard Hot 100	43
US Hot Country Songs (Billboard)	1
US Adult Contemporary (Billboard)	23
US Cashbox Top 100	56

== In popular culture ==
The song inspired an answer song titled "That Makes It", recorded by actress Jayne Mansfield in 1964, and released as the B-side to "Little Things Mean A Lot". Mansfield performed the song in the 1966 film The Las Vegas Hillbillys.
