= The Killer Rocks On =

Studio album by Jerry Lee Lewis
- Released: 1972
- Recorded: Nashville, Tennessee
- Genre: Rock and roll
- Label: Mercury
- Producer: Jerry Kennedy

Jerry Lee Lewis chronology
Would You Take Another Chance on Me? (1971)	The Killer Rocks On (1972)	Who's Gonna Play This Old Piano? (1972)

Professional ratings
Review scores
Source	Rating
Christgau's Record Guide	B

The Killer Rocks On is a studio album by American rock and roll pioneer Jerry Lee Lewis, released on Mercury Records in 1972.

== Recording and reception ==
Producer Jerry Kennedy recalled of the sessions to Lewis biographer Nick Tosches, "He wanted everybody there. He didn't want anything overdubbed later. It was a mess. We had an acre of people there - voices, strings, everything. And, as always, Jerry Lee started changin' keys, and the arranger was goin' crazy, havin' to rewrite stuff for the string section..."

== Track listing ==
No.	Title	Writer(s)	Length
1.	"Don't Be Cruel"	Otis Blackwell; Elvis Presley	1:58
2.	"You Can Have Her"	William S. Cook	2:22
3.	"Games People Play"	Joe South	2:33
4.	"Lonely Weekends"	Charlie Rich	1:45
5.	"You Don't Miss Your Water"	William Bell	2:31
6.	"Turn On Your Love Light"	Deadric Malone; Joseph Scott	2:30
7.	"Chantilly Lace"	J.P. Richardson	2:50
8.	"C.C. Rider"	Traditional	2:52
9.	"Walk a Mile In My Shoes"	South	3:02
10.	"Me and Bobby McGee"	Fred Foster; Kris Kristofferson	3:11
11.	"Shotgun Man"	Cecil Harrelson	2:43
12.	"I'm Walkin'"	Dave Bartholomew; Fats Domino	2:09
Total length:			30:26

== Charts ==
Chart (1972)	Peak position
Australia (Kent Music Report)	30

== Personnel ==
- Jerry Lee Lewis - vocals, piano
- Chip Young, Dale Sellers, Harold Bradley, Pete Wade, Ray Edenton, Jerry Kennedy - guitar
- Pete Drake - steel guitar
- Kenny Lovelace - fiddle
- Bob Moore - bass
- Bill Strom - organ
- Buddy Harman - drums
- Charlie McCoy - marimba; arranger on "Turn on Your Love Light"
- Dolores Edgen, Hursel Wiginton, Joe Babcock, Millie Kirkham, Rickie Page, Trish Williams - backing vocals
- Cam Mullins - arrangements
