= Shoeshine Man =

Single by Tom T. Hall

from the album Homecoming
- B-side: "Kentucky in the Morning"
- Released: March 23, 1970
- Recorded: July 3, 1969
- Studio: Monument Recording, Nashville, Tennessee
- Genre: Country, rockabilly
- Length: 3:02
- Label: Mercury 73039
- Songwriter(s): Tom T. Hall
- Producer(s): Jerry Kennedy

Tom T. Hall singles chronology
"A Week in a Country Jail" (1969)	"Shoeshine Man" (1970)	"Salute to a Switchblade" (1970)

"Shoeshine Man" is a song written and recorded by American country music artist Tom T. Hall. It was released in March 1970 as the fourth and final single from the album, Homecoming. The song peaked at number 8 on the U.S. country singles chart and at number 10 on the Canadian country singles chart. The rockabilly number tells the story of a shoe-shining harmonica player in Montgomery, Alabama, who professes to be "number one in the land."

== Chart performance ==
Chart (1970)	Peak position
US Hot Country Songs (Billboard)	8
Canadian RPM Country Tracks	10
