= Touching Home (song) =

Single by Jerry Lee Lewis

from the album Touching Home
- A-side: "Touching Home" "Woman, Woman (Get Out of Our Way)"
- Released: March 1971
- Genre: Country
- Length: 2:34
- Label: Smash
- Songwriter(s): Dallas Frazier; A. L. Owens
- Producer(s): Jerry Kennedy

Jerry Lee Lewis singles chronology
"In Loving Memories" / "I Can't Have a Merry Christmas, Mary (Without You)"" (1970)	"Touching Home" / "Woman, Woman (Get Out of Our Way)" (1971)	"Love on Broadway" / "Matchbox" (1971)

"Touching Home" is a song written by Dallas Frazier and A. L. Owens and originally recorded by American musician Jerry Lee Lewis for his Mercury Records' album of the same name (1971). It was also released as a single [with "Woman, Woman (Get Out of Our Way)" from Mercury's album There Must Be More to Love Than This on the flip side], reaching number 5 on the Cash Box Country Singles chart and number 3 on the Billboard country chart.

== Track listing ==
7" single (Mercury 73192, 1971)
No.	Title	Length
1.	"Touching Home"
2.	"Woman, Woman (Get Out of Our Way)" (From Mercury's album There Must Be More to Love Than This)

== Charts ==
Chart (1970)	Peak position
US Hot Country Songs (Billboard)	3
US Cash Box Country Singles	5

== See also ==
- Touching Home (album)#Recording
