= The Pool Shark (song) =

Single by Dave Dudley

from the album The Pool Shark
- B-side: "Bigger They Come The Harder They Fall"
- Released: February 21, 1970
- Genre: Country
- Length: 2:59
- Label: Mercury
- Songwriter(s): Tom T. Hall
- Producer(s): Jerry Kennedy

Dave Dudley singles chronology
| "George (And the North Woods)" (1969) | "The Pool Shark" (1970) | "This Night (Ain't Fit for Anything But Drinking)" (1970) |

"The Pool Shark" is a song written by Tom T. Hall and recorded by American country music artist Dave Dudley. It was released in February 1970 as the lead single from the album of the same name, The Pool Shark. The song was Dave Dudley's twenty-first release on the country chart and his only number one. The single stayed at the top of the country charts for one week and spent a total of fourteen weeks on the chart.

== Story ==
The song tells the story of a young traveling man and hard-luck gambler who stops at a roadside bar. After watching one of the regulars, a middle-aged man, play pool for a while, the two strike up a conversation and agree to play a game. Eventually, the two play a long best-of series of the games, with the regular revealing himself to be a pro at the game who, under the guise of a friendly challenge, frequently hustles unwary opponents out of money.

The pro eventually winning all the main protagonist's money -- $187 plus his ring -- and leaves in a Cadillac with a beautiful young woman ("a blonde built like the rest of that car"). In the end, the protagonist asks the waitress out; the conversations with her had been interspersed occasionally with the main story.

== Chart performance ==
| Chart (1970) | Peak position |
|---|---|
| U.S. Billboard Hot Country Singles | 1 |
| Canadian RPM Country Tracks | 4 |
