= Would You Take Another Chance on Me? =

Studio album by Jerry Lee Lewis
- Released: 1971
- Recorded: Nashville, Tennessee
- Genre: Country
- Length: 31:26
- Label: Mercury
- Producer: Jerry Kennedy

Jerry Lee Lewis chronology
Touching Home (1971)	Would You Take Another Chance on Me? (1971)	The Killer Rocks On (1972)

Would You Take Another Chance on Me? is a studio album by American musician and pianist Jerry Lee Lewis, released on Mercury Records in 1971.

== Track listing ==
No.	Title	Writer(s)	Length
1.	"Would You Take Another Chance on Me"	Jerry Foster; Bill Rice	2:53
2.	"Another Hand Shakin' Goodbye"	Dallas Frazier; Sanger D. Shafer	2:37
3.	"Swinging Doors"	Merle Haggard	2:51
4.	"Thirteen at the Table"	Buddy Emmons	3:38
5.	"Big Blon' Baby"	Kenny Jacobson; Rhoda Roberts	2:05
6.	"Lonesome Fiddle Man"	Frazier; Shafer	2:33
7.	"Me and Bobby McGee"	Fred Foster; Kris Kristofferson	3:12
8.	"For the Good Times"	Kristofferson	3:45
9.	"Things That Matter Most to Me"	Thomas LaVerne; Bill Taylor; Don Pittman	3:13
10.	"The Hurtin' Part"	LaVerne; Taylor	2:27
11.	"The Goodbye of the Year"	Frazier; A. L. Owens	2:12
Total length:			31:26

== Personnel ==
- Jerry Lee Lewis - vocals, piano
- Chip Young, Harold Bradley, Jerry Kennedy, Ray Edenton - guitar
- Pete Drake - steel guitar
- Kenny Lovelace - fiddle
- Bob Moore - bass
- Bill Strom - organ
- Buddy Harman - drums
- The Nashville Edition - vocal accompaniment; Cam Mullins - arrangements on "Would You Take Another Chance on Me", "Me and Bobby McGee" and "For the Good Times"
- The Nashville Sounds - vocal accompaniment

== Reception ==
AllMusic states that the collection "is slowed by layers of backing vocals, gauzy accouterments that turn this into an album approximating romance..."

== Charts ==
Chart	Song	Peak	Ref
Hot Country Songs	Me and Bobby McGee	1	
Billboard Hot 100	Me and Bobby McGee	44	
Billboard Top 40	Me and Bobby McGee	39	
Hot Country Songs	Would You Take Another Chance on Me	1	
Canadian RPM Country Tracks	Would You Take Another Chance on Me	2	
Top Country Albums	—N/a	3	
Billboard 200	—N/a	115	
