= In Search of a Song =

Studio album by Tom T. Hall
- Released: 1971
- Recorded: Tracks 1 & 9: March 26, 1971; Other tracks: May 1971
- Studio: Mercury Custom Recording Studio, Nashville, Tennessee
- Genre: Country music, Progressive country
- Length: 30:50
- Label: Mercury
- Producer: Jerry Kennedy

Tom T. Hall chronology
One Hundred Children (1970)	In Search of a Song (1971)	We All Got Together and... (1972)

Professional ratings
Review scores
Source	Rating
Allmusic	5/5 stars
Christgau's Record Guide	A
Rolling Stone	(favorable)

In Search of a Song is the fifth studio album by country singer-songwriter Tom T. Hall, released in 1971. The album includes eleven songs based on Hall's observations of rural life. It became a number eight top country album and the opening track, "The Year That Clayton Delaney Died," became a number one country single.

== History ==
In Search of a Song was released amid Hall's first stint with Mercury Records (1969–1977), during which he released one or more albums each year (see Tom T. Hall discography). It is the first full album to result from one of Hall's "song-hunting" trips to Kentucky. Hall was known to make periodic visits to rural Kentucky. He didn't actually write songs on these trips so much as take notes and gather raw material that he would later write about. He typically traveled backroads by car, sometimes with a photographer, to find inspiration by observing and visiting with the common people of his home state. On this particular trip, Hall traveled with music journalist William "Bill" Neuel Littleton of Nashville, TN. Littleton took the photographs that appear on the album's front and back cover, subsequently writing the album's liner notes.

In a 1998 interview with online publication Perfect Sound Forever, Hall reflected on his songwriting approach: "I used to get into my car and drive out to an intersection and put my finger out the window and find out which way the wind was blowing. And I'd just take off in that direction. I'd just drive around for a couple of weeks stopping in small towns, beer joints, cafes, you know, road side motels. Nobody knew who I was. [...] So I did several albums. I did one great album. My best album is called In Search Of A Song."

== Track listing ==
All songs by Hall

1. "The Year That Clayton Delaney Died" – 2:42
2. "Who's Gonna Feed Them Hogs" – 2:35
3. "Trip to Hyden" – 2:52
4. "Tulsa Telephone Book" – 2:21
5. "It Sure Can Get Cold in Des Moines" – 2:53
6. "The Little Lady Preacher" – 2:53
7. "L.A. Blues" – 2:40
8. "Kentucky, February 27, 1971" – 3:16
9. "A Million Miles to the City" – 2:51
10. "Second Handed Flowers" – 2:55
11. "Ramona's Revenge" – 2:53

== Personnel ==
=== Musicians ===
- Tom T. Hall – guitar, vocals
- Jerry Kennedy – guitar, dobro, sitar
- Ray Edenton – guitar
- Chip Young – guitar
- Harold Bradley – six-string bass guitar, banjo
- Pete Drake – pedal steel guitar, dobro
- Bob Moore – bass
- Buddy Harman – drums
- Hargus "Pig" Robbins – piano
- George Tidwell – trumpet
- Charlie McCoy – harmonica, vibes

=== Production ===
- Jerry Kennedy – Producer
- Tracks 1 & 9 recorded March 26, 1971
- Other tracks recorded May 1971, Mercury Custom Recording Studio, Nashville, Tennessee

== Charts ==
Year	Chart	Position
1971	U.S. Top Country	8
1971	U.S. 200	137

== Releases ==
Year	Format	Label	Catalog #
1971	LP	Mercury	822500-1
1971	Audio cassette	Mercury	822500-4
2005	Re-issue CD	Mercury	—
2005	Compilation disc	Hux	71
2006	Remastered CD	Hip-O Select	000424002
