= You Mean the World to Me (David Houston song) =

Single by David Houston

from the album You Mean the World to Me
- B-side: "Don't Mention Tomorrow"
- Released: August 1967
- Genre: Country
- Length: 2:15
- Label: Epic
- Songwriter(s): Billy Sherrill; Glenn Sutton
- Producer(s): Billy Sherrill

David Houston singles chronology
"With One Exception" (1967)	"You Mean the World to Me" (1967)	"Have a Little Faith" (1968)

"You Mean the World to Me" is a song written by Billy Sherrill and Glenn Sutton, and recorded by American country music artist David Houston. It was released in August 1967 as the first single and title track from the album You Mean the World to Me. The song was Houston's third number one on the country charts as a solo artist. The single spent two weeks at number one and a total of sixteen weeks on the chart.

== Chart performance ==
Chart (1967)	Peak position
US Hot Country Songs (Billboard)	1
U.S. Billboard Hot 100	75
Canadian RPM Country Tracks	1
