= We All Got Together and... =

Studio album by Tom T. Hall
- Released: 1972
- Recorded: 1972
- Studio: Mercury Custom Recording Studio, Nashville, Tennessee
- Genre: Country music
- Label: Mercury
- Producer: Jerry Kennedy

Tom T. Hall chronology
In Search of a Song (1971)	We All Got Together and... (1972)	The Storyteller (1972)

We All Got Together and... is a 1972 album by Tom T. Hall released on Mercury Records. All songs except "High Steppin' Proud" were written by Tom T. Hall. The album reached number 12 on Billboard Country Charts.

Two tracks were released as singles from the album. The first was "Me and Jesus" that reached number 8 on the Billboard Country Chart and also made it to number 98 on the Billboard Hot 100. The second was "The Monkey That Became President" that reached number 11 on the Billboard Country Chart.

== Track listing ==
All tracks composed by Tom T. Hall; except where indicated
Side A

1. "Turn It On, Turn It On, Turn It On" (4:11)
2. "Souvenirs" (2:52)
3. "Pamela Brown" (2:36)
4. "Bourbon Man" (3:38)
5. "The Promise and The Dream" (Backing Vocals - Millie Kirkham) (2:50)
6. "She Gave Her Heart to Jethro" (4:08)

Side B

1. "Coot Marseilles Blues" (3:29)
2. "The Monkey That Became President" (3:00)
3. "Pratt Street" (2:08)
4. "High Steppin' Proud" (Hillman Hall) (2:46)
5. "Me and Jesus" (Backing Vocals – The Mt. Pisgah United Methodist Church Choir) (3:20)

== Charts ("Me and Jesus") ==
=== Weekly charts ===
Chart (1972)	Peak position
US Billboard Hot 100	98
US Hot Country Songs (Billboard)	8

=== Year-end charts ===
Chart (1972)	Position
US Hot Country Songs (Billboard)	48
