= Already It's Heaven =

Single by David Houston

from the album Already It's Heaven
- B-side: "Lighter Shade of Blue"
- Released: May 1968
- Genre: Country
- Label: Epic
- Songwriter(s): Billy Sherrill; Glenn Sutton
- Producer(s): Billy Sherrill

David Houston singles chronology
| "Have a Little Faith" (1968) | "Already It's Heaven" (1968) | "Where Love Used to Live" (1968) |

"Already It's Heaven" is a song written by Billy Sherrill and Glenn Sutton, and recorded by American country music artist David Houston. It was released in May 1968 as the second single and title track from the album Already It's Heaven. The single was Houston's sixteenth release on the country charts. "Already It's Heaven" spent one week at the top of the country charts and total of fifteen weeks on the chart.

== Chart performance ==
| Chart (1968) | Peak position |
|---|---|
| US Hot Country Songs (Billboard) | 1 |
| Canadian RPM Country Tracks | 1 |
