= The Year That Clayton Delaney Died =

1971 single by Tom T. Hall

Single by Tom T. Hall

from the album In Search of a Song
- B-side: "Second Handed Flowers"
- Released: July 5, 1971
- Recorded: March 26, 1971; Mercury Custom Recording Studio, Nashville, Tennessee
- Genre: Country
- Length: 2:42
- Label: Mercury 73221
- Songwriter(s): Tom T. Hall
- Producer(s): Jerry Kennedy

Tom T. Hall singles chronology
| "Ode to Half a Pound of Ground Round" (1971) | "The Year That Clayton Delaney Died" (1971) | "Me and Jesus" (1972) |

"The Year That Clayton Delaney Died" is a song written and recorded by American country music artist Tom T. Hall.

== Background ==
The song is based on Hall's childhood neighbor and boyhood hero, Lonnie Easterly.

== Chart performance ==
It was released in July 1971 as the only single from the album, In Search of a Song. "The Year That Clayton Delaney Died" was Hall's second number one on the country chart. The single stayed at number one for two weeks and spent a total of eighteen weeks on the country charts.

=== Weekly charts ===
| Chart (1971) | Peak position |
|---|---|
| U.S. Billboard Hot Country Singles | 1 |
| U.S. Billboard Hot 100 | 42 |
| Canadian RPM Country Tracks | 6 |
| Canadian RPM Top Singles | 42 |

=== Year-end charts ===
| Chart (1971) | Rank |
|---|---|
| U.S. Country (Billboard) | 4 |
