= Faster Horses (The Cowboy and the Poet) =

Single by Tom T. Hall

from the album Faster Horses
- B-side: "No New Friends Please"
- Released: December 1975
- Recorded: November 21, 1975; US Recording Studios, Nashville, Tennessee
- Genre: Country, country rock
- Label: Mercury 73755
- Songwriter(s): Tom T. Hall
- Producer(s): Jerry Kennedy

Tom T. Hall singles chronology
"I Like Beer" (1975)	"Faster Horses (The Cowboy and the Poet)" (1975)	"Negatory Romance" (1976)

"Faster Horses (the Cowboy and the Poet)" is a song written and recorded by American country music artist Tom T. Hall. It was released in December 1975 as the second single from the album, Faster Horses. Members of the Western Writers of America chose it as one of the Top 100 Western songs of all time.

== Background ==
A young poet encounters a cowboy in a local bar and is struck by his thin, worn appearance from years of hard work. Sensing the cowboy has words of inspiration to share, the poet approaches the cowboy, who responds that the only good things in life are "faster horses, younger women, older whiskey and more money." He goes on to explain that "to pray for peace and rain" is just a wish to be prosperous, which to him is "buffalo chips." The poet responds that he has no interest in any of those things, but the cowboy calls him a liar.

The irritated poet grabs the cowboy to fight but relents when a weapon is pulled on him. In the end, the would-be poet swears off philosophical pursuits and, pondering what he would say if his son asked him the meaning of life, suggests he would recite the cowboy's list.

== Senate reference ==
The chorus was given in evidence to a U.S. Senate subcommittee by the banking consultant Alex Sheshunoff:

Mr. Sheshunoff: ...we recently did a lot of market research on what bank customers really want from the banks they do business with. We asked them what they really wanted and what do you think is important, and what do you really want; and unfortunately, just as we were able to publish our market research, it was preempted by Mr. Tom T. Hall from Nashville, Tenn., when he said, faster horses, younger women and older whiskey.
Senator McIntyre: Say that again, faster horses, younger women and older whiskey?
Mr. Sheshunoff: And more money.

== Chart performance ==
The song was Hall's final number one on the Billboard Hot Country Singles chart, spending one week at the top and a total of 13 weeks within the chart's top 40.

=== Weekly charts ===
Chart (1975–76)	Peak position
US Hot Country Songs (Billboard)	1
Canadian RPM Country Tracks	2

=== Year-end charts ===
Chart (1976)	Position
US Hot Country Songs (Billboard)	13
