= With One Exception =

Single by David Houston

from the album A Loser's Cathedral
- B-side: "Sweet Sweet Judy"
- Released: March 1967
- Genre: Country
- Label: Epic
- Songwriter(s): Billy Sherrill; Glenn Sutton
- Producer(s): Billy Sherrill

David Houston singles chronology
"A Loser's Cathedral" (1967)	"With One Exception" (1967)	"You Mean the World to Me" (1967)

"With One Exception" is a song written by Billy Sherrill and Glenn Sutton, and recorded by American country music artist David Houston. It was released in March 1967 as the third single from the album A Loser's Cathedral. The song was Houston's second number one on the country charts. The single stayed at number one for a single week and spent a total of fifteen weeks on the chart.

== Chart performance ==
Chart (1967)	Peak position
U.S. Billboard Hot Country Singles	1
