= My Woman's Good to Me =

Single by David Houston

from the album Where Love Used to Live/My Woman's Good to Me
- B-side: "Lullaby to a Little Girl"
- Released: January 1969
- Genre: Country
- Label: Epic
- Songwriter(s): Billy Sherrill; Glenn Sutton
- Producer(s): Billy Sherrill

David Houston singles chronology
"Where Love Used to Live" (1968)	"My Woman's Good to Me" (1969)	"I'm Down to My Last 'I Love You'" (1969)

"My Woman's Good to Me"

Single by George Benson

from the album Tell It Like It Is
- B-side: "Jackie, All"
- Released: June 1969
- Recorded: Van Gelder Studio, Englewood Cliffs May 20, 1969
- Genre: Soul
- Label: A&M 1076 S
- Songwriter(s): Billy Sherrill; Glenn Sutton
- Producer(s): Creed Taylor

George Benson singles chronology
"Shape Of Things To Come" (1968)	"My Woman's Good to Me" (1969)	"My Cherie Amour" (1969)

"My Woman's Good to Me" is a song written by Billy Sherrill and Glenn Sutton, and recorded by American country music artist David Houston. It was released in January 1969 as the third single from his album Where Love Used to Live/My Woman's Good to Me. The song peaked at number 4 on the Billboard Hot Country Singles chart. It also reached number 1 on the RPM Country Tracks chart in Canada.

George Benson recorded "My Woman's Good to Me" on May 20, 1969 and included his version on the album Tell It Like It Is. Benson's version, recorded in New York, charted in the lower reaches of the Billboard Hot 100. In the following decade it became popular in the United Kingdom on the flourishing Northern Soul scene.

== Chart performance ==
Chart (1969)	Peak position
US Hot Country Songs (Billboard)	4
Canadian RPM Country Tracks	1
