= Touching Home (album) =

Studio album by Jerry Lee Lewis
- Released: 1971
- Recorded: Nashville, Tennessee
- Genre: Country
- Length: 29:33
- Label: Mercury
- Producer: Jerry Kennedy

Jerry Lee Lewis chronology
There Must Be More to Love Than This (1971)	Touching Home (1971)	Would You Take Another Chance on Me? (1971)

Touching Home is a studio album by American musician and pianist Jerry Lee Lewis, released on Mercury Records in 1971.

== Recording ==
The single "Touching Home" would become Lewis' twelfth Top 10 country hit since 1968 and the title track for his third Mercury album of 1971. Lewis gives a riveting performance on the song, his vocal conveying the emotional torment found in the lyrics as he moans "No longer do I wonder why men have lost their minds, or wind up in a jungle of flashing neon signs." A second single, "When He Walks On You (The Way You Have Walked on Me)," barely missed the Top Ten, peaking at number 11. The album also includes Kris Kristofferson's "Help Me Make It Through the Night", a song Lewis greatly respected; in 2014 he told biographer, Rick Bragg, that the song was a "masterpiece...You don't mess with Kristofferson." Lewis was also in the habit of occasionally recording songs written by his younger sister Linda Gail Lewis, such as "Foolish Kind of Man," which she penned with her husband and Lewis guitarist Kenny Lovelace.

== Reception ==
AllMusic calls Touching Home "a hard country album, lacking overall sweetened gloss. It's a good, strong shot of barroom country, filled with broken-hearted ballads and enlivened by a rollicking 'Please Don't Talk About Me When I'm Gone,' and given some pathos by 'Mother, The Queen of My Heart,' a bit of kitsch that doesn't seem so corny when surrounded by so much tough country." The album reached number 11 on the Billboard country albums chart.

== Track listing ==
No.	Title	Writer(s)	Length
1.	"When He Walks On You (Like You Have Walked On Me)"	Dallas Frazier; A. L. Owens	2:34
2.	"Time Changes Everything"	Tommy Duncan	2:27
3.	"Help Me Make It Through the Night"	Kris Kristofferson	3:02
4.	"Mother, The Queen of My Heart"	Jimmie Rodgers; Slim Bryant	3:05
5.	"Hearts Were Made for Beating"	Lamar Morris; Warren Keith	2:38
6.	"Foolish Kind of Man"	Linda Gail Lewis; Kenneth Lovelace	2:37
7.	"Touching Home"	Frazier; Owens	2:40
8.	"Please Don't Talk About Me When I'm Gone"	Sidney Clare; Sam H. Stept; Bee Palmer	2:28
9.	"You Helped Me Up (When the World Let Me Down)"	Cile Davis; Carmen Holland; Clyde Pitts	2:18
10.	"When Baby Gets the Blues"	Charles R. Phipps	2:51
11.	"Comin' Back for More"	Ray Griff	2:53
Total length:			29:33

== Personnel ==
- Jerry Lee Lewis - vocals, piano
- Chip Young, Dale Sellers, Harold Bradley, Jerry Shook, Pete Wade, Ray Edenton - guitar
- Lloyd Green, Pete Drake - steel guitar
- Kenny Lovelace - fiddle
- Bill Strom, Bob Moore - bass
- Buddy Harman, Jerry Carrigan - drums
- The Nashville Sounds, The Jordanaires - vocal accompaniment
