= Where Love Used to Live =

Single by David Houston

from the album Where Love Used to Live/My Woman's Good to Me
- B-side: "I Love a Rainbow"
- Released: September 1968
- Genre: Country
- Label: Epic
- Songwriter(s): Billy Sherrill; Glenn Sutton

David Houston singles chronology
"Already It's Heaven" (1968)	"Where Love Used to Live" (1968)	"My Woman's Good to Me" (1969)

"Where Love Used to Live" is a song written by Billy Sherrill and Glenn Sutton, and recorded by American country music artist David Houston. It was released in September 1968 as the first single from his album Where Love Used to Live/My Woman's Good to Me. The song peaked at number 2 on the Billboard Hot Country Singles chart. It also reached number 1 on the RPM Country Tracks chart in Canada.

== Chart performance ==
Chart (1968)	Peak position
US Hot Country Songs (Billboard)	2
Canadian RPM Country Tracks	1
