= Have a Little Faith (David Houston song) =

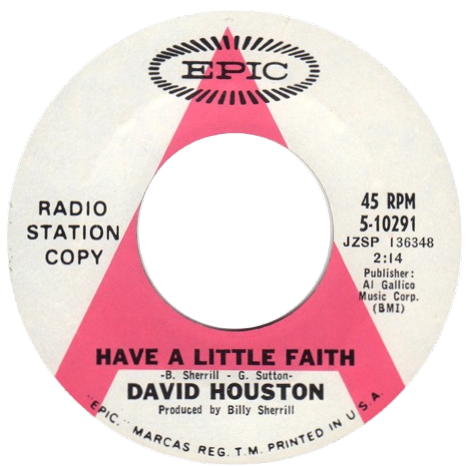

Single by David Houston

from the album Already It's Heaven
- B-side: "Too Far Gone"
- Released: February 1968
- Recorded: Early 1968
- Genre: Country
- Label: Epic
- Songwriters: Billy Sherrill; Glenn Sutton
- Producer: Billy Sherrill

David Houston singles chronology
"You Mean the World to Me" (1967)	"Have a Little Faith" (1968)	"Already It's Heaven" (1968)

"Have a Little Faith" is a song written by Billy Sherrill and Glenn Sutton, and recorded by American country music artist David Houston.

== Release ==
It was released in February 1968 as the first single from the album Already It's Heaven. The song was Houston's fourth number one single on the country charts. The single stayed at number one for a single week and spent a total of thirteen weeks on the chart. "Have a Little Faith" was a crossover hit peaking at #18 on Billboard's Easy Listening survey.

== Charts ==
Chart performance for "Have a Little Faith"
Chart (1968)	Peak position
US Hot Country Songs (Billboard)	1
U.S. Billboard Easy Listening	18
US Billboard Hot 100	98
Canadian RPM Country Tracks	1

== Other Versions ==
- Patti Page recorded the song for her country-pop album Gentle On My Mind in 1968.
- Bob Luman released a version as the B-side to his 1972 single, "When You Say Love".
