= Song in a Seashell =

Studio album by Tom T. Hall
- Released: 1985
- Studio: Young 'Un Sound, Nashville, Tennessee
- Genre: Country
- Label: Mercury
- Producer: Jerry Kennedy

Tom T. Hall chronology
| Natural Dreams (1984) | Song in a Seashell (1985) | Country Songs for Kids (1989) |

Song in a Seashell is an album by American country music singer Tom T. Hall released in 1985 on Mercury Records. The album reached No. 63 on the Billboard country albums chart, while three of its singles reached the country singles chart, "A Bar with No Beer" (No. 40), "Down in the Florida Keys" (No. 42), and "Love Letters in the Sand" (No. 79).

== Track listing ==
All tracks composed by Tom T. Hall; except where indicated

Side 1

1. "That Lucky Old Sun" (Haven Gillespie, Beasley Smith) – 2:16
2. "A Bar with No Beer" (Gordon Parsons, Benny Barnes) – 2:52
3. "I Have Friends – 2:39
4. "A Song in a Seashell" – 2:05
5. "Red Sails in the Sunset" (Jimmy Kennedy, Hugh Williams) – 2:50

Side 2

1. "Down in the Florida Keys" – 2:46
2. "Love Letters in the Sand" (Fred Coots, Charles Kenny, Nick Kenny) – 2:13
3. "This Ain’t Exactly What I Had in Mind" – 3:36
4. "Gone Fishin’" (Nick Kenny, Charles Kenny) – 2:31
5. "We're All Through Dancing" – 2:51

== Musicians ==
- David Briggs, Hargus "Pig" Robbins - keyboards
- Jerry Carrigan, Ron Gannaway - percussion
- Ray Edenton, Jerry Kennedy, Pete Wade, Chip Young - guitar
- Weldon Myrick - steel guitar
- Mike Leech - bass guitar
- George Binkley, John Borg, Roy Christensen, Virginia Christensen, Connie Callopy, Charles Everett, Carl Gorodetzky, Lennie Haight, Lee Larrison, Dennis Molchan, Pamela Sixfin, Mark Tanner, Gary Vanosdale, Stephanie Woolf - strings (Nashville String Machine)
- Bergen White - string arrangements
- The Beach Buch - background vocals on "Down in the Florida Keys"

== Production ==
- Produced by Jerry Kennedy
- Recorded and Mixed at Young 'Un Sound, Nashville, Tennessee
- Engineers: Ron "Snake" Reynolds, assisted by Barry Foy
- Mastered at Master Mix, Nashville, Tennessee, by Hank Williams
- Album Design: Bill Brunt (Private Eye Studio)
- Photography: Scott Bonner & Ron Keith
