= Ravishing Ruby =

Single by Tom T. Hall

from the album Rhymer and Other Five and Dimers
- B-side: "I Flew Over Our House Last Night"
- Released: April 9, 1973
- Recorded: February 6, 1973; Mercury Custom Recording Studio, Nashville, Tennessee
- Genre: Country
- Length: 2:28
- Label: Mercury 73377
- Songwriter: Tom T. Hall
- Producer: Jerry Kennedy

Tom T. Hall singles chronology
| "Hello, We're Lonely" (1972) | "Ravishing Ruby" (1973) | "Watergate Blues" (1973) |

"Ravishing Ruby" is a song written and recorded by American country music artist Tom T. Hall. It was recorded on February 6, 1973, and released in April 1973 as the first single from his album Rhymer and Other Five and Dimers. The song peaked at number 3 on the Billboard Hot Country Singles chart. It also reached number 1 on the RPM Country Tracks chart in Canada.

== Chart performance ==
| Chart (1973) | Peak position |
|---|---|
| U.S. Billboard Hot Country Singles | 3 |
| Canadian RPM Country Tracks | 1 |
