= Tell It Like It Is (George Benson album) =

Studio album by George Benson
- Released: August 1969
- Recorded: April 29, 1969 (#6–7, 9); May 16, 1969 (#1–5); May 20, 1969 (#8, 10–11)
- Studios: Van Gelder Studio, Englewood Cliffs, NJ
- Genre: Jazz
- Length: 32:27
- Labels: A&M/CTI; SP 3020
- Producer: Creed Taylor

George Benson chronology
Goodies (1968)	Tell It Like It Is (1969)	The Other Side of Abbey Road (1970)

Singles from Tell It Like It Is
- 1. "My Woman's Good to Me" Released: 1969

Tell It Like It Is is the seventh album by American guitarist George Benson featuring performances recorded in 1969 and released on the A&M label.

== Chart performance ==
The album peaked at No. 145 on the Billboard Top LPs chart.

== Reception ==
The AllMusic review states "Benson manages to transcend the blasting Latin-percussion-spiced production, the tight time limits, and all with often brilliantly tasty guitar fills and brief solos in many styles and three reverb-heavy vocals".

Professional ratings
Review scores
Source	Rating
AllMusic	3/5 stars

== Track listing ==
1. "Soul Limbo" (Booker T. & the M.G.'s) – 3:25
2. "Are You Happy" (Theresa Bell, Jerry Butler, Kenneth Gamble) – 2:27
3. "Tell It Like It Is" (George Davis, Lee Diamond) – 2:51
4. "Land of 1000 Dances" (Chris Kenner) – 2:48
5. "Jackie, All" (Eumir Deodato) – 2:14
6. "Don't Cha Hear Me Callin' to Ya" (Rudy Stevenson) – 3:16
7. "Water Brother" (Don Sebesky) – 2:09
8. "My Woman's Good to Me" (Billy Sherrill, Glenn Sutton) – 3:14
9. "Jama Joe" (George Benson) – 3:49
10. "My Cherie Amour" (Stevie Wonder, Henry Cosby, Sylvia Moy) – 3:28
11. "Out in the Cold Again" (Ted Koehler, Rube Bloom) – 2:41

== Personnel ==
- George Benson – guitar, vocals
- Lew Soloff – trumpet
- Arthur Clarke (tracks 1–5), Bob Porcelli (tracks 6, 7 & 9), Hubert Laws (tracks 6, 7 & 9), Jerome Richardson (tracks 1–5, 8, 10 & 11), Joe Farrell (tracks 8, 10 & 11), Joe Henderson (tracks 8, 10 & 11), Sonny Fortune (tracks 1–5) – saxophone
- Rodgers Grant (tracks 6, 7 & 9), Richard Tee (tracks 1–5, 8, 10 & 11) – piano
- Bob Bushnell (tracks 1–5), Jerry Jemmott (tracks 1–7 & 9), Jim Fielder (tracks 8, 10 & 11) – bass guitar
- Leo Morris – drums
- Paul Alicea, Angel Allende, Johnny Pacheco – percussion
- Marty Sheller – arranger, conductor

Technical

- Pete Turner – photography

== Charts ==
Chart (1969)	Peak position
US Billboard Top LPs	145
