= Goodies (George Benson album) =

Studio album by George Benson
- Released: February/March 1969
- Recorded: November 18 & 19, 1968
- Studio: A&R Studios, New York City
- Genre: Jazz
- Length: 38:12
- Label: Verve; V6 8771
- Producer: Esmond Edwards

George Benson chronology
Shape of Things to Come (1968)	Goodies (1969)	Tell It Like It Is (1969)

Professional ratings
Review scores
Source	Rating
AllMusic	2/5 stars

Goodies is the sixth album by jazz guitarist George Benson recorded in 1968 and released on the Verve label.

== Reception ==
AllMusic awarded the album 2 stars stating "Verve needed one more album from Benson after he signed with A&M/CTI, and ended up with a strange grab-bag in which Benson plays superbly throughout, whatever the odd goulash of sounds in back of him".

== Track listing ==
All compositions by George Benson except as indicated

1. "I Remember Wes" – 3:50
2. "Carnival Joys" – 3:50
3. "(You Make Me Feel Like) A Natural Woman" (Carole King, Gerry Goffin, Jerry Wexler) – 4:40
4. "That Lucky Old Sun" (Beasley Smith, Haven Gillespie) – 3:37
5. "Julie" – 3:10
6. "Windmills of Your Mind" (Michel Legrand, Alan and Marilyn Bergman) – 5:00
7. "Doobie, Doobie Blues" – 5:10
8. "Song for My Father" (Horace Silver) – 4:45
9. "People Get Ready" (Curtis Mayfield) – 4:10

== Personnel ==
=== Musicians ===
- George Benson – guitar, vocals
- Clark Terry – trumpet
- Garnett Brown – trombone
- Arthur Clarke – tenor saxophone, flute
- George Marge – tenor saxophone, flute
- Bobby Lucas – harmonica
- Paul Griffin – piano, celeste
- Bob Cranshaw – electric bass (tracks 4, 6–7)
- Chuck Rainey – bass guitar (tracks 1–3, 5, 8–9)
- Jimmy Johnson Jr. – drums (tracks 4, 6–7)
- Leo Morris – drums (tracks 1–3, 5, 8–9)
- Jack Jennings – congas, vibraphone
- The Sweet Inspirations – vocals
- The Winston Collymore Strings arranged and conducted by Horace Ott (tracks 2, 4, 5 & 7)

=== Technical ===
- Esmond Edwards – producer
- Val Valentin – engineering director
- Don Hahn – engineer
- Barton Beneš – cover art
- Stephen Stuart – photography
- Del Shields – liner notes
