= Deal (Tom T. Hall song) =

Single by Tom T. Hall

from the album I Wrote a Song About It
- B-side: "It Rained in Every Town Except Paducah"
- Released: May 19, 1975
- Recorded: April 23, 1975; Mercury Custom Recording Studio, Nashville, Tennessee
- Genre: Country
- Length: 2:30
- Label: Mercury
- Songwriter: Tom T. Hall
- Producer: Jerry Kennedy

Tom T. Hall singles chronology
"I Care" (1974)	"Deal" (1975)	"I Like Beer" (1975)

"Deal" is a song written and recorded by American country music artist Tom T. Hall. It was released in May 1975 as the only single from the album, I Wrote a Song About It. The song peaked at number 8 on both the U.S. and the Canadian country singles chart.

== Chart performance ==
Chart (1975)	Peak position
US Hot Country Songs (Billboard)	8
Canadian RPM Country Tracks	8
