= What Have You Got to Lose =

Single by Tom T. Hall

from the album Places I've Done Time
- B-side: "Three Sofa Story"
- Released: August 28, 1978
- Genre: Country
- Length: 3:12
- Label: RCA
- Songwriter(s): Tom T. Hall
- Producer(s): Roy Dea

Tom T. Hall singles chronology
"I Wish I Loved Somebody Else" (1978)	"What Have You Got to Lose" (1978)	"Son of Clayton Delaney" (1979)

"What Have You Got to Lose" is a song written and recorded by American country music artist Tom T. Hall. It was released in August 1978 as the lead single from the album, Places I've Done Time. The song peaked at number 9 on the U.S. country singles chart and at number 14 on the Canadian country singles chart.

== Chart performance ==
Chart (1978)	Peak position
US Hot Country Songs (Billboard)	9
Canadian RPM Country Tracks	14
