= Places I've Done Time =

Studio album by Tom T. Hall
- Released: 1978
- Studios: Toy Box, Brentwood, Tennessee
- Genre: Country
- Label: RCA Victor
- Producers: Roy Dea, Tom T. Hall

Tom T. Hall chronology
New Train Same Rider (1978)	Places I've Done Time (1978)	Saturday Morning Songs/The “Is” Songs (1979)

Places I've Done Time is a studio album by American country music singer-songwriter Tom T. Hall, released by RCA Records in 1978, reaching number 19 in the US country charts and number 17 in the Canadian country charts. Two singles from the album, "What Have You Got to Lose" and "Son of Clayton Delaney", also charted in both countries.

== Track listing ==
All tracks composed by Tom T. Hall; except where indicated
Side 1

1. "What Have You Got to Lose"
2. "I Couldn't Live in Southern California"
3. "The Grocery Truck"
4. "The Man Who Shot Himself"
5. "Son of Clayton Delaney"

Side 2

1. "Mr. Bojangles" (Jerry Jeff Walker)
2. "The Three Sofa Story"
3. "The Great East Broadway Onion Championship of 1978"
4. "Hat Full of Feathers" (Glen Ray)
5. "Gimme Peace" (Hillman Hall)

== Musicians ==
- Harold Bradley, James Marshall - bass guitar
- Henry Strzelecki, Floyd Chance - bass
- Harold Bradley - banjo
- Hayward Bishop - drums
- Bobby Wood - piano
- Bill Wence - electric piano
- Ray Edenton, Jerry Shook, Gary Lusk, Charles Stewart, Chip Young - rhythm guitar
- Rick Money - acoustic guitar
- Murrel Counts - fiddle
- Dale Sellers - electric guitar, acoustic dobro
- James Edwards - slide dobro, mandolin
- Sheldon Kurland, Virginia Christensen, Carl Goradetzky, Wilfred Lehman, Stephen Smith, Samuel Terranova, Pamela Vonasdale, Stephanie Woolf - violin
- Marvin Chantry, Gary Vanosdale - viola
- Byron Bach, Roy Christensen - cello
- Cam Mullins - string arrangements
- Lea Jane Berinati, Yvonne Hodges, Sherilyn Kramer - backing vocals

== Production ==
- Producers: Ken Nelson & Fuzzy Owen
- Recording Engineer: Al Pachuki
- Assistant Engineer: Stan Beaver
- Mastering Engineer: Randy Kling
- Recorded at the Toy Box, Brentwood, Tennessee
- Front album cover photo: Hope Powell
- Back album cover montage: Joe Horton
- Album art direction: Mary Lancaster, Pinwheel Studios
