= There Must Be More to Love Than This (album) =

Studio album by Jerry Lee Lewis
- Released: 1971
- Recorded: Nashville, Tennessee
- Genre: Country, honky-tonk
- Length: 29:18
- Label: Mercury
- Producer: Jerry Kennedy

Jerry Lee Lewis chronology
In Loving Memories: The Jerry Lee Lewis Gospel Album (1971)	There Must Be More to Love Than This (1971)	Touching Home (1971)

There Must Be More to Love Than This is a studio album by American musician and pianist Jerry Lee Lewis, released on Mercury Records in 1971.

== Track listing ==
No.	Title	Writer(s)	Length
1.	"There Must Be More to Love Than This"	Thomas LaVerne; Bill Taylor	2:45
2.	"Bottles and Barstools"	Glenn Sutton	2:49
3.	"Reuben James"	Barry Etris; Alex Harvey	2:45
4.	"I'd Be Talkin' All the Time"	Chuck Howard; Larry Kingston	2:21
5.	"One More Time"	Larry Butler; Jan Crutchfield; Buddy Killen	2:24
6.	"Sweet Georgia Brown"	Ben Bernie; Kenneth Casey; Maceo Pinkard	2:29
7.	"Woman, Woman (Get Out of My Way)"	Linda Gail Lewis; Cecil J. Harrelson	3:17
8.	"I Forgot More Than You'll Ever Know"	Cecil A. Null	2:42
9.	"Foolaid"	Harrelson; Carmen Holland	2:33
10.	"Home Away from Home"	Jerry Chesnut	2:33
11.	"Life Has Its Little Ups and Downs"	Margaret Ann Rich	2:40
Total length:			29:18

== Personnel ==
- Jerry Lee Lewis – vocals, piano
- Buck Hutcheson, Chip Young, Harold Bradley, Ray Edenton – guitar
- Ned Davis – steel guitar
- Kenny Lovelace – fiddle
- Bob Moore, Eddie DeBruhl – bass
- Buddy Harman, Kenny Buttrey – drums

== Charts ==
=== Weekly charts ===
Chart (1971)	Peak position
US Billboard 200	190
US Top Country Albums (Billboard)	8

=== Year-end charts ===
Chart (1971)	Position
US Top Country Albums (Billboard)	45
