= Country Is =

Single by Tom T. Hall

from the album Country Is
- B-side: "God Came Through Bellville Georgia"
- Released: September 9, 1974
- Genre: Country
- Length: 2:09
- Label: Mercury
- Songwriter(s): Tom T. Hall
- Producer(s): Jerry Kennedy

Tom T. Hall singles chronology
"That Song Is Driving Me Crazy" (1974)	"Country Is" (1974)	"I Care" (1974)

"Country Is" is a song written and recorded by American country music artist Tom T. Hall. It was released in September 1974 as the second and final single from the album of the same name, Country Is. The song was Hall's fifth number one on the country chart. The single went to number one for a single week and spent a total of eleven weeks on the country chart.

== Chart performance ==
Chart (1974)	Peak position
US Hot Country Songs (Billboard)	1
Canadian RPM Country Tracks	1
