= That Song Is Driving Me Crazy =

Single by Tom T. Hall

from the album Country Is
- B-side: "Forget It"
- Released: May 20, 1974
- Recorded: April 15, 1974; Mercury Custom Recording Studio, Nashville, Tennessee
- Genre: Country
- Length: 3:08
- Label: Mercury 73488
- Songwriter(s): Tom T. Hall
- Producer(s): Jerry Kennedy

Tom T. Hall singles chronology
"I Love" (1973)	"That Song Is Driving Me Crazy" (1974)	"Country Is" (1974)

"That Song Is Driving Me Crazy" is a song written and recorded by American country music artist Tom T. Hall. It was released in May 1974 as the lead single from the album Country Is. The song peaked at number 2 on both the U.S. and Canadian country singles charts.

== Chart performance ==
Chart (1974)	Peak position
Canadian RPM Country Tracks	2
Canadian RPM Top Singles	58
U.S. Billboard Hot Country Singles	2
U.S. Billboard Hot 100	63
U.S. Billboard Adult Contemporary	24
U.S. Cash Box Top 100	60
