= Don't Keep Me Hangin' On =

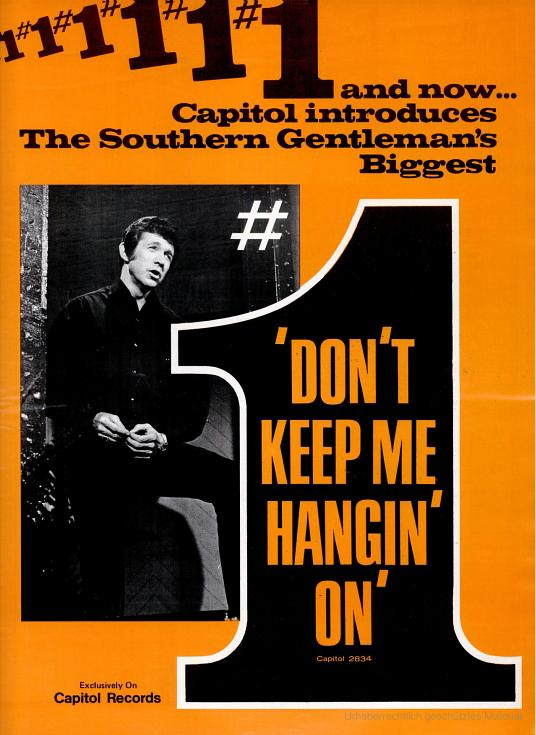

Single by Sonny James

from the album My Love/Don't Keep Me Hangin' On
- B-side: "Woodbine Valley"
- Released: June 1970
- Genre: Country
- Label: Capitol
- Songwriter(s): Sonny James; Carole Smith
- Producer(s): George Richey; Kelso Herston

Sonny James singles chronology
"My Love" (1970)	"Don't Keep Me Hangin' On" (1970)	"Endlessly" (1970)

"Don't Keep Me Hangin' On" is a 1970 single by Sonny James. It was James's thirty-fourth release to reach the U.S. country singles chart, spending four weeks at number one and a total of fourteen weeks on the chart.

== Chart performance ==
Chart (1970)	Peak position
U.S. Billboard Hot Country Singles	1
Canadian RPM Country Tracks	17
