= David Houston (singer) =

American country singer (1935–1993)

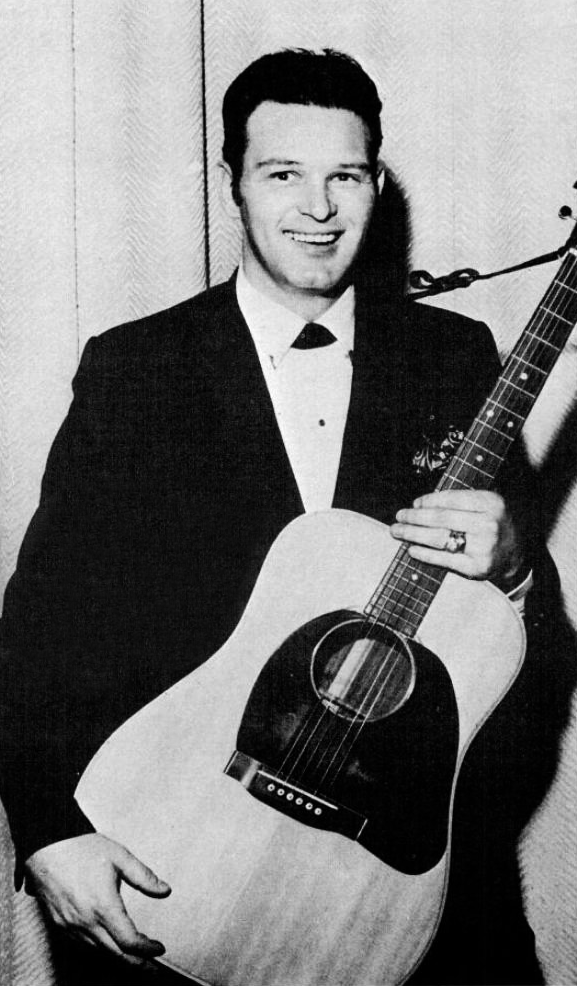
- David Houston in 1965

Background information
- Born: Charles David Houston; December 9, 1935
- Origin: Bossier City, Louisiana, U.S.
- Died: November 30, 1993 (aged 57) Bossier City, Louisiana
- Genres: Country
- Occupation: Singer
- Instruments: Guitar; vocals
- Years active: 1950s–1989
- Label: Epic

Charles David Houston (December 9, 1935 – November 30, 1993) was an American country music singer. His peak in popularity came between the mid-1960s and the early 1970s.

His biggest success came in 1966, when his recording of "Almost Persuaded", topped the Billboard's Hot Country Singles chart for nine weeks, and garnered Houston a pair of Grammy Awards.

== Biography ==
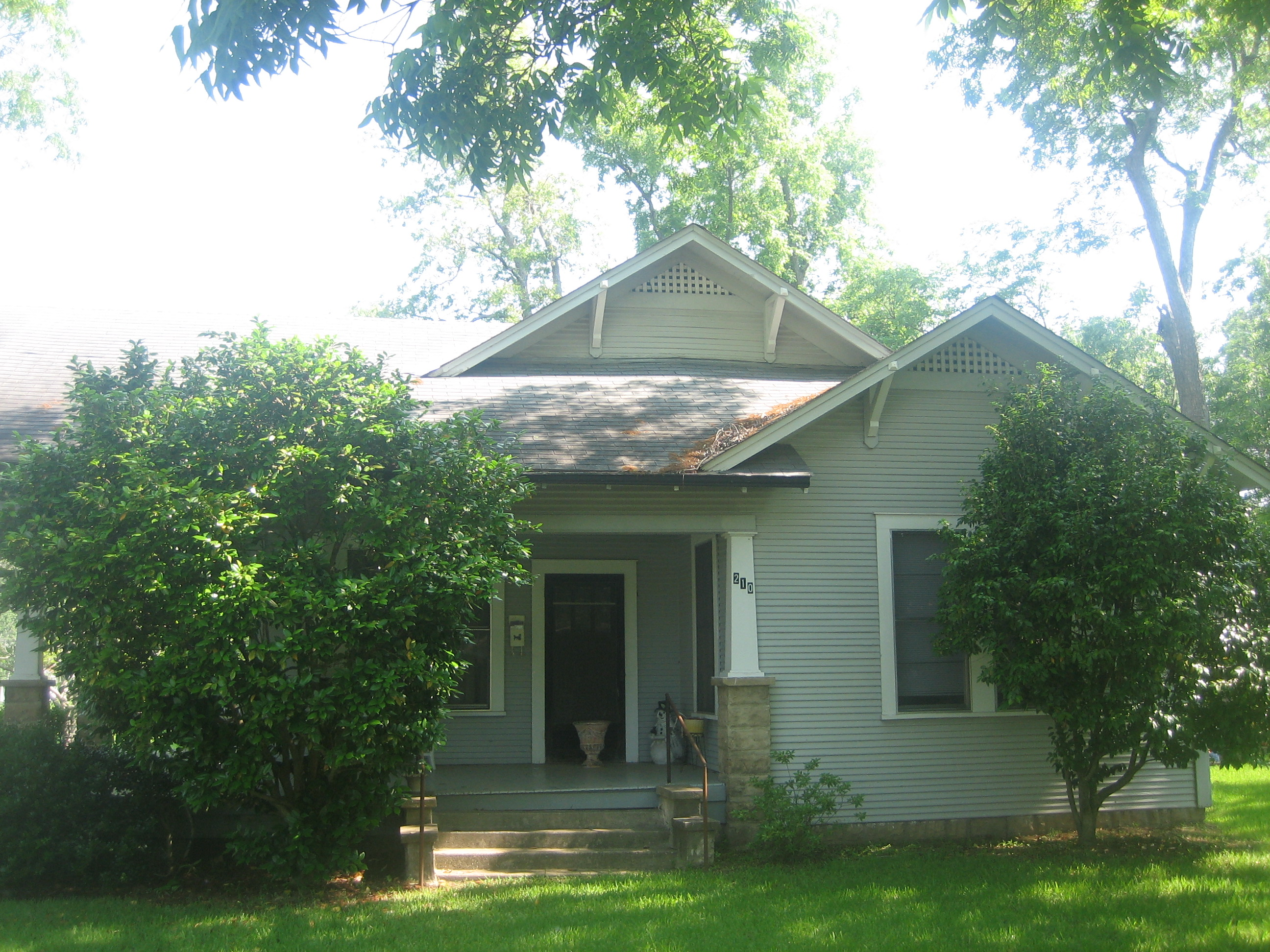
David Houston's childhood home in Minden, Louisiana

Houston was born in Bossier City in northwestern Louisiana, United States. He claimed to be a descendant of Sam Houston, the first president of the Republic of Texas (there is no available data to support this claim) and Confederate General Robert E. Lee. His godfather was 1920s pop singer Gene Austin. Like Austin, Houston lived briefly as a youth in a house at the intersection of Marshall and Goodwill streets in Minden, the seat of Webster Parish in northwestern Louisiana. Another musician from Minden, Tommy Tomlinson, collaborated with Houston in the single "Mountain of Love".

Houston was one of the earliest artists with National Recording Corporation in Atlanta, Georgia. In 1963, he rose to national stardom with "Mountain of Love"; the song, which was different from the tune made famous by composer Harold Dorman, Johnny Rivers, and Charley Pride, rose to number two on Billboard's Hot Country Singles chart, as did "Livin' in a House Full of Love" (1965).

In 1966, Houston recorded "Almost Persuaded". This song, which is unrelated to the Philip Paul Bliss hymn of the same title, is the tale of a married man managing to resist a temptress he meets in a tavern. Houston's recording of it quickly reached number one that August, eventually spending nine weeks atop Billboard's Hot Country Singles chart. For 46 years, no song did as well until Taylor Swift matched its nine-week record on December 15, 2012, with "We Are Never Ever Getting Back Together". (Swift's song went on to surpass the nine-week run of "Almost Persuaded", spending a 10th week at No. 1 in early 2013.)

Houston was awarded two Grammy Awards for Best Country & Western Recording and Best Country & Western Performance, Male in 1967 for "Almost Persuaded" which began a string of top five Houston singles through 1973, including six more number ones: "With One Exception" and "You Mean the World to Me" (1967); "Have a Little Faith" and "Already It's Heaven" (1968); "Baby, Baby (I Know You're a Lady)" (1970); and 1967's "My Elusive Dreams" duet with Tammy Wynette.

In later years, Houston sang duets with Barbara Mandrell on several of her early hits, most notably 1970's "After Closing Time" and 1972's "I Love You, I Love You".

Houston's last Top 10 country hit came in 1974 with "Can't You Feel It", though he continued making records until 1989.

Houston died of a brain aneurysm on November 30, 1993, in Bossier City, one week before his 58th birthday. He had been residing in the New Orleans suburb of Kenner.

== Discography ==
=== Albums ===
Year	Album	Chart Positions		Label
Year	Album	US Country	US	Label
1964	New Voice from Nashville	—	—	Epic
1965	Twelve Great Country Hits	—	—	Epic
1966	Almost Persuaded	1	57	Epic
1967	A Loser's Cathedral	12	—	Epic
1967	Golden Hyms	—	—	Epic
1967	My Elusive Dreams (with Tammy Wynette)	11	—	Epic
1967	You Mean the World to Me	3	—	Epic
1968	David Houston's Greatest Hits	20	—	Epic
1968	Already It's Heaven	9	—	Epic
1969	Where Love Used to Live / My Woman's Good to Me	27	—	Epic
1969	David	14	143	Epic
1970	Baby, Baby	7	194	Epic
1970	The World of David Houston	35	—	Epic
1970	Wonders of the Wine	13	170	Epic
1971	A Woman Always Knows	22	218	Epic
1971	David Houston's Greatest Hits, Volume II	21	—	Epic
1972	The Day That Love Walked In	14	—	Epic
1972	A Perfect Match (with Barbara Mandrell)	38	—	Epic
1973	The Many Sides of David Houston	45	—	Epic
1973	Good Things	17	—	Epic
1975	A Man Needs Love	—	—	Epic
1976	What a Night	—	—	Epic
1977	David Houston	—	—	Starday
1978	Best	—	—	Gusto
1979	From the Heart of Houston	—	—	Derrick
1980	Next Sunday I'm Gonna Be Saved	—	—	Excelsior
1981	From Houston to You	—	—	Excelsior
"—" denotes releases that did not chart.

=== Singles ===
Year	Single	Chart Positions			Album
Year	Single	US Country	US	CAN Country	Album
1963	"Mountain of Love"	2	132	—	New Voice from Nashville
1964	"Passing Through"	37	—	—	New Voice from Nashville
1964	"Chickashay"	17	—	—	New Voice from Nashville
1964	"One If for Him, Two If for Me"	11	—	—	New Voice from Nashville
1964	"Love Looks Good on You"	17	—	—	New Voice from Nashville
1965	"Sweet, Sweet Judy"	18	—	—	A Loser's Cathedral
1965	"Rose Colored Glasses"	—	—	—	A Loser's Cathedral
1965	"Livin' in a House Full of Love"	3	117	—	Almost Persuaded
1966	"Sammy"	47	—	—	single only
1966	"Almost Persuaded"^{A}	1	24	—	Almost Persuaded
1966	"Where Could I Go? (But to Her)"	14	133	—	A Loser's Cathedral
1966	"A Loser's Cathedral"	3	135	—	A Loser's Cathedral
1967	"With One Exception"	1	—	—	A Loser's Cathedral
1967	"You Mean the World to Me"	1	75	1	You Mean the World to Me
1968	"Have a Little Faith"	1	98	1	Already It's Heaven
1968	"Already It's Heaven"	1	—	1	Already It's Heaven
1968	"Where Love Used to Live"	2	—	1	Where Love Used to Live/ My Woman's Good to Me
1969	"My Woman's Good to Me"	4	—	1	Where Love Used to Live/ My Woman's Good to Me
1969	"I'm Down to My Last 'I Love You'"	3	—	4	A Woman Always Knows
1969	"Baby, Baby (I Know You're a Lady)"	1	—	1	Baby, Baby
1970	"I Do My Swinging at Home"	3	—	4	Wonders of the Wine
1970	"Wonders of the Wine"	6	—	5	Wonders of the Wine
1971	"A Woman Always Knows"	2	—	1	A Woman Always Knows
1971	"Nashville"	9	—	24	David Houston's Greatest Hits, Volume II
1971	"Home Sweet Home"	32	—	—	Good Things
1971	"Maiden's Prayer"	10	—	19	Good Things
1972	"The Day That Love Walked In"	18	—	20	The Day That Love Walked In
1972	"Soft, Sweet and Warm"	8	—	6	Good Things
1972	"I Wonder How John Felt (When He Baptized Jesus)"	41	—	—	single only
1972	"Good Things"	2	—	3	Good Things
1973	"She's All Woman"	3	—	6	Good Things
1973	"The Lady of the Night"	22	—	95	single only
1974	"That Same Ol' Look of Love"	33	—	—	A Man Needs Love
1974	"Can't You Feel It"	9	—	13	A Man Needs Love
1975	"A Man Needs Love"	36	—	—	A Man Needs Love
1975	"I'll Be Your Steppin' Stone"	40	—	45	What a Night
1975	"Sweet Molly" (with Calvin Crawford)	69	—	—	What a Night
1975	"The Woman on My Mind"	35	—	—	What a Night
1976	"What a Night"	51	—	—	What a Night
1976	"Lullaby Song"	—	—	—	singles only
1976	"Come on Down (To Our Favorite Forget-About-Her Place)"	24	—	—	singles only
1977	"So Many Ways"	33	—	—	David Houston
1977	"Ain't That Lovin' You Baby"	68	—	—	David Houston
1977	"The Twelfth of Never"	98	—	—	David Houston
1977	"It Started All Over Again"	56	—	—	Best
1978	"No Tell Motel"	72	—	—	Best
1978	"Waltz of the Angels"	51	—	—	From the Heart of Houston
1978	"Best Friends Make the Worst Enemies"	46	—	—	From the Heart of Houston
1979	"Faded Love and Winter Roses"	33	—	—	From the Heart of Houston
1979	"Let Your Love Fall Back on Me"	57	—	—	From the Heart of Houston
1979	"Here's to All the Too Hard Working Husbands (In the World)"	60	—	—	From the Heart of Houston
1980	"You're the Perfect Reason"	64	—	—	singles only
1980	"Sad Love Song Lady"	78	—	—	singles only
1981	"My Lady"	—	—	—	From Houston to You
1981	"Texas Ida Red"	69	—	—	From Houston to You
1989	"A Penny for Your Thoughts Tonight Virginia"	85	—	—	single only
"—" denotes releases that did not chart.

- ^{A}"Almost Persuaded" also peaked at No. 45 on the RPM Top Singles chart in Canada.

=== Singles from collaboration albums ===
Year	Single	Collaborator	Chart Positions			Album
Year	Single	Collaborator	US Country	US	CAN Country	Album
1967	"My Elusive Dreams"	Tammy Wynette	1	89	—	My Elusive Dreams
1968	"It's All Over"	Tammy Wynette	11	—	—	My Elusive Dreams
1970	"After Closing Time"	Barbara Mandrell	6	—	4	A Perfect Match
1971	"We've Got Everything but Love"	Barbara Mandrell	20	—	—	A Perfect Match
1972	"A Perfect Match"	Barbara Mandrell	24	—	—	A Perfect Match
1973	"I Love You, I Love You"	Barbara Mandrell	6	—	18	A Perfect Match
1974	"Lovin' You Is Worth It"	Barbara Mandrell	40	—	—	A Perfect Match
1974	"Ten Commandments of Love"	Barbara Mandrell	14	—	9	A Man Needs Love
"—" denotes releases that did not chart.

== Notes ==
Missing from David Houston's 45 Discography are "We Got Love" (1964) and "My Little Lady" (1965).

== Bibliography ==
- Roy, Don. (1998). "David Houston". In The Encyclopedia of Country Music. Paul Kingsbury, Editor. New York: Oxford University Press. p. 249. ISBN 978-0195176087
