= I Love (Tom T. Hall song) =

Song by Tom T. Hall

Single by Tom T. Hall

from the album For the People in the Last Hard Town
- B-side: "Back When We Were Young"
- Released: October 29, 1973
- Recorded: 1973
- Genre: Country
- Label: Mercury
- Songwriter: Tom T. Hall
- Producer: Jerry Kennedy

Tom T. Hall singles chronology
"Watergate Blues" (1973)	"I Love" (1973)	"That Song Is Driving Me Crazy" (1974)

"I Love" is a song written and recorded by American country music artist Tom T. Hall. It was released in October 1973 as the only single from the album For the People in the Last Hard Town. The song would be Hall's most successful single and was his fourth number one on the US country singles chart, spending two weeks at the top and a total of 15 weeks on the chart. Additionally, "I Love" was Hall's sole entry on the Top 40, peaking at number 12.

== Covers and alternative versions ==
- Addressing potential censorship issues, an alternative version of Hall's recording replaced the lyrics "bourbon in a glass and grass" with "old TV shows and snow".
- "I Love" was used, with altered lyrics, in a popular 2003 TV commercial for Coors Light, which prominently featured the Klimaszewski Twins.
- A parody of the song titled "I Like" appeared on The Rhino Brothers Present the World's Worst Records.

== Soundtrack appearances ==
The song was used in the film For No Good Reason.

== Chart performance ==
=== Weekly charts ===
Chart (1973–1974)	Peak position
Australian Go-Set Chart	35
Australia KMR	28
Canadian RPM Country Tracks (2wks@#1)	1
Canadian RPM Top Singles	13
Canadian RPM Adult Contemporary Tracks	7
New Zealand (Listener)	20
US Hot Country Songs (Billboard)	1
US Billboard Hot 100	12
US Adult Contemporary (Billboard)	2
US Cash Box Top 100	17

=== Year-end charts ===
Chart (1974)	Rank
Australia KMR	161
Canada RPM Top Singles	95
US Billboard Hot 100	83
