= Baby, Baby (I Know You're a Lady) =

Single by David Houston

from the album Baby, Baby
- B-side: "True Love's a Lasting Thing"
- Released: October 1969 (U.S.)
- Recorded: 1969
- Genre: Country
- Length: 2:20
- Label: Epic
- Songwriter(s): Alex Harvey and Norro Wilson
- Producer(s): Billy Sherrill

David Houston singles chronology
"I'm Down to My Last 'I Love You'" (1969)	"Baby, Baby (I Know You're a Lady)" (1969)	"I Do All My Swinging At Home" (1970)

"Baby, Baby (I Know You're a Lady)" is a song made famous by country music singer David Houston.

Originally released in 1969, the song represented a first and a last. The last was that it was Houston's seventh (and final) No. 1 hit on the Billboard magazine Hot Country Singles chart; the song spent four weeks atop the chart.

The song was also the first time up-and-coming Nashville songwriter Norro Wilson had one of his compositions hit number one; it was a shared credit with co-writer Alex Harvey. During the next four decades, Wilson would become one of country music's most prolific songwriters and producers. He wrote hits for singers including Charley Pride, Charlie Rich, Jean Shepard, Tammy Wynette and others; his production credits would include songs by Pride, Joe Stampley, Wynette, Kenny Chesney, Sara Evans, Janie Fricke, Reba McEntire and others.

== Chart performance ==
Chart (1969–1970)	Peak position
U.S. Billboard Hot Country Singles	1
Canadian RPM Country Tracks	1
Australian (Kent Music Report)	97

== Sources ==
- Baby, Baby (I Know You're a Lady), AllMusic
- Roland, Tom, "The Billboard Book of Number One Country Hits" (Billboard Books, Watson-Guptill Publications, New York, 1991 (ISBN 0-82-307553-2))
