= I Care (Tom T. Hall song) =

Single by Tom T. Hall

from the album Songs of Fox Hollow
- B-side: "Sneaky Snake"
- Released: December 16, 1974
- Genre: Country
- Label: Mercury
- Songwriter(s): Tom T. Hall
- Producer(s): Jerry Kennedy

Tom T. Hall singles chronology
"Country Is" (1974)	"I Care" (1974)	"Deal" (1975)

"I Care" is a song written and recorded by American country music artist Tom T. Hall. It was released in December 1974 as the only single from the album Songs of Fox Hollow. "I Care" was Hall's sixth number one on the U.S. country singles chart. The single had a one-week stay at number one and remained on the chart for a total of ten weeks.

== B-side ==
The B-side of the single "I Care" was "Sneaky Snake," which captured enough attention to crossover to the pop market (including #1 at some pop stations in the Midwest) and peak at #55 on the Billboard Hot 100 singles chart in 1975. It was his final recording to crossover to the Billboard Hot 100 singles chart.

"Sneaky Snake" is a novelty song about an anthropomorphic snake who likes sneaking up on people and stealing their root beer. After omnisciently observing how Sneaky Snake "goes dancin', wigglin', and a-hissin'/Sneaky Snake goes dancin', gigglin', and a-kissin'," the singer states how he doesn't like him because he laughs, due to moving through the grass and "ticklin' his underneath."

Both songs can be found on Greatest Hits Vol. 2 (1975).

== Charts ==
=== Weekly charts ===
Chart (1974–75)	Peak position
US Hot Country Songs (Billboard)	1
Canadian RPM Country Tracks	6

=== Year-end charts ===
Chart (1975)	Position
US Hot Country Songs (Billboard)	46
