= I Like Beer =

Single by Tom T. Hall

from the album I Wrote a Song About It
- B-side: "From a Mansion to a Honky Tonk"
- Released: August 25, 1975
- Recorded: March 27, 1975; Mercury Custom Recording Studio, Nashville, Tennessee
- Genre: Country
- Length: 2:52
- Label: Mercury 73704
- Songwriter(s): Tom T. Hall
- Producer(s): Jerry Kennedy

Tom T. Hall singles chronology
"Deal" (1975)	"I Like Beer" (1975)	"Faster Horses (The Cowboy and the Poet)" (1975)

"I Like Beer" is a song written and recorded by American country music artist Tom T. Hall. The song was released in August 1975 as the lead single from the album I Wrote a Song About It. The song peaked at number 4 on the U.S. country singles chart and number 12 on the Canadian country singles chart.

== Plot ==
In the first verse, Hall explains that in previous songs of his, that he mentioned his fondness for beer, and for this song, he would like to make this explicit, praising its mood-mellowing effects and explaining in the chorus that he does not like the coarseness of whiskey, the cost of champagne, or the effects vodka has on him (makes him run his mouth, ostensibly getting him in trouble). In the second verse, he takes joy in embarrassing his vermouth-drinking wife by yelling out for a beer. In the third verse, Hall tells of a dream he had of heaven, where the water tasted like beer before, to his disappointment, "they turned it all into wine."

== Chart performance ==
Chart (1975–76)	Peak position
Australian (Kent Music Report)	70
Canadian RPM Country Tracks	12
New Zealand (Listener)	30
U.S. Billboard Hot Country Singles	4
