= There Must Be More to Love Than This (song) =

Single by Jerry Lee Lewis

from the album There Must Be More to Love Than This
- B-side: "Home Away from Home"
- Released: July 1970
- Genre: Country, honky-tonk
- Length: 2:46
- Label: Mercury
- Songwriters: Bill Taylor; Thomas LaVerne
- Producer: Jerry Kennedy

Jerry Lee Lewis singles chronology
"I Can't Seem to Say Goodbye" (1970)	"There Must Be More to Love Than This" (1970)	"Waiting for a Train" (1970)

"There Must Be More to Love Than This" is a 1970 single by Jerry Lee Lewis. It was Lewis's fourth number one on the U.S. country music chart. The single spent two weeks at the top spot and a total of fourteen weeks on the chart.

== Charts ==
=== Weekly charts ===
Chart (1970)	Peak position
US Hot Country Songs (Billboard)	1
Canadian RPM Country Tracks	1

=== Year-end charts ===
Chart (1970)	Position
US Hot Country Songs (Billboard)	12
