= A Week in a Country Jail =

Single by Tom T. Hall

from the album Homecoming
- B-side: "Flat Footin'-It"
- Released: November 24, 1969
- Recorded: March 4, 1969; Columbia Studio, Nashville, Tennessee
- Genre: Country
- Length: 3:00
- Label: Mercury 72998
- Songwriter(s): Tom T. Hall
- Producer(s): Jerry Kennedy

Tom T. Hall singles chronology
"Homecoming" (1969)	"A Week in a Country Jail" (1969)	"Shoeshine Man" (1969)

"A Week in a Country Jail" is a song written and recorded by American country music artist Tom T. Hall. It was released in November 1969 as the third and final single from his 1969 studio album Homecoming. The song was Hall's fifth release to reach the U.S. country singles chart and the first of seven number-ones. "A Week in a Country Jail" stayed at the top for two weeks and spent a total of thirteen weeks on the chart.

== Content ==
The song begins with the protagonist being arrested for speeding while standing on red at traffic lights. He spends the night in a jail cell, being served hot bologna, eggs and gravy and, during his prolonged stay, becomes interested in the jailer's wife. After seven days, the inmate is finally lectured on traffic laws by the judge who takes "every nickel he had" and releases him.

== Chart performance ==
Chart (1969–1970)	Peak position
US Hot Country Songs (Billboard)	1
Canadian RPM Country Tracks	32
