= Dave Dudley =

American country singer (1928–2003)

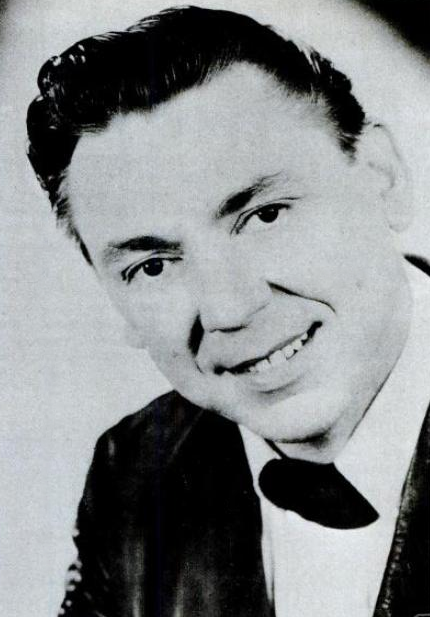

Background information
- Born: May 3, 1928; Spencer, Wisconsin, U.S.
- Died: December 22, 2003 (aged 75) Danbury, Wisconsin, U.S.
- Genres: Country music, Truck-driving country
- Occupation: Singer
- Years active: 1951–2003
- Labels: National Recording Corporation; Golden Wing Records; Mercury Records

Dave Dudley (May 3, 1928 – December 22, 2003) was an American country music singer best known for his truck-driving country anthems of the 1960s and 1970s and his somewhat-slurred bass. His signature song was "Six Days on the Road", and he is also remembered for "Vietnam Blues", "Truck Drivin' Son-of-a-Gun", and "Me and Ol' C.B.". His other recordings include a duet with Tom T. Hall, "Day Drinking", and his own top-10 hit, "Fireball Rolled a Seven", supposedly based on the career and death of Edward Glenn "Fireball" Roberts.

== Biography ==
=== Early life and rise to fame ===
Born in Spencer, Wisconsin, United States, Dudley's grandparents came from Königsberg in East Prussia, Germany. His father, then a local tavern owner, gave Dudley his first guitar at the age of 11.

Baseball was Dudley's first love, and in high school, he was a standout pitcher. In 1942, the New York Yankees obtained his option. At the time, Dudley was serving in the U.S. Navy in the South Pacific, having convinced his mother to sign his enlistment papers when he was 17. She also signed the baseball option on his behalf. After his military service, his contract was transferred to the Chicago White Sox organization. In April 1948, the White Sox assigned him to their Wisconsin Rapids affiliate for spring training in Hot Springs, Arkansas and was later transferred him to the Gainesville Owls of the Big State League in Texas. After an arm injury abruptly ended Dudley's baseball career, he dropped by WTMT in Wausau, Wisconsin and began hosting his Texas Stranger Show, playing Country Western music while also performing on air.

In early 1951, Dudley began performing in taverns across northeastern Wisconsin, usually as part of a trio that worked under a variety of names and lineups. They were billed at different times as Dave Dudley and His Rodeo Riders and Dave Dudley and His Country Caravan before eventually settling on The Dave Dudley Trio.

That May, the group began an 18-week residency at The Flame in Green Bay, Wisconsin, where they performed mostly country-western songs alongside a few numbers from the Hawaiian songbook each night.

By May 1952, they had recorded their first single, “Nashville Blues” backed with “You Don't Care,” a 78 rpm disc released on Pfau Records of Milwaukee.

Dudley continued playing tavern residencies and gradually built a local following. In March 1953, he appeared on WTMJ-TV in Milwaukee, which further boosted his popularity.

In 1955, Dudley signed with King Records, a Cincinnati label recognized for its roster of country, R&B, and early rock ’n’ roll artists. Over the next two years, King released three of his 45 rpm singles. In 1959, National Recording Corporation released his single, "Where's There's a Will".

In 1960, Dudley moved to Minneapolis, Minnesota, where he started performing under the billing, Dave Dudley and the Country Gentlemen. He also began hosting his own radio show again, this time on KEVE in Minneapolis. On December 3, 1960, while packing away his guitar after a performance, Dudley was seriously injured when struck by a car. Following a lengthy recovery, Dudley returned to performing and reached the Top 40 county charts for the first time with “Maybe I Do” in 1961 and “Under Cover of the Night” in 1962.

=== Height of his career ===
In 1963, Jimmy C. Newman gave Dudley the demo for "Six Days on the Road". Soon after, while running under time during a recording session, the song was cut unrehearsed and completed on the second take. It was released as a single on Golden Wing Records, a label Dudley had founded using settlement money from his earlier accident. Released in late-April 1963, “Six Days on the Road” became Dave Dudley's breakout hit, roaring up the Billboard Hot Country Singles chart and peaking at number two that summer. The only song standing between him and the number-one spot was Johnny Cash's “Ring of Fire,” which dominated the charts at the same time. The record spent 21 weeks on the chart and also crossed over to the pop market, peaking at number 32 on the Billboard Hot 100. One of the first radio stations to play the single was WOKY-AM, a Milwaukee rock station. The song would go on to sell over one million copies.

"It's amazing to hear the record was selling 10,000 copies a day," Dudley later recalled to the Nevada State Journal in 1973. "It's also amazing how many companies will offer you a contract that wouldn't before."

The success of “Six Days on the Road” led to a recording contract with Mercury Records and by the end of 1963, he released his first single from the label, "Last Day in the Mines". Dudley scored more big hits in the 1960s, including "Truck Drivin' Son-of-a-Gun", "Trucker's Prayer", and "Anything Leaving Town Today". "Six Days on the Road" was subsequently recorded by several other artists, including George Thorogood and the Destroyers, Steve Earle, the Flying Burrito Brothers, and Sawyer Brown.

Dudley continued to have success into the 1970s, while continuing to record for Mercury Records. He had some country top 10s in the 1970s, including "Comin' Down" and "Fly Away Again". By the late 1970s, his success on the charts was beginning to fade, although Dudley amassed 33 top-40 country hits.

In 1978, Dudley's name became known to the audience in Germany after the German country band Truck Stop had a single top-10 hit in Germany, titled "Ich möcht’ so gern Dave Dudley hör’n" ("I would like to listen to Dave Dudley so much[, to Hank Snow and Charley Pride]".

=== Late career and death ===
In the 1980s, Dudley continued to record sporadically, and remained popular in concert. During this time, he was elected to the Nashville Teamsters Truck Drivers Union, receiving a solid gold membership card from the union. He also found out that he had a big fan base in Europe, and decided to try to appeal more to this market. Dudley purchased Staples Lake Resort in the mid 1970s, and ran a successful business/resort there until the mid- to late-1980s with wife, Marie. During his ownership, he also sponsored several country music festivals on the property.

In total, Dudley recorded more than 70 albums, but he did not manage to reclaim his past success, and neither his single "Where's That Truck?", recorded with disc jockey Charlie Douglas, nor the track "Dave Dudley, American Trucker", recorded in 2002 in the wake of the September 11 attacks, helped revive his career. Few of his hits have made it onto CDs and albums, creating a market for his vintage vinyl recordings.

Dudley died on December 22, 2003, aged 75, after suffering a heart attack in his car in a parking lot in Danbury, Wisconsin.

== Discography ==
=== Albums ===
Year	Album	US Country	Label
1963	Dave Dudley Sings Six Days on the Road	16	Golden Wing
1964	Songs About the Working Man	19	Mercury
1964	Travelin' with Dave Dudley	8	Mercury
1964	Talk of the Town	16	Mercury
1965	Rural Route No. 1	—	Mercury
1965	Truck Drivin' Son-of-a-Gun	3	Mercury
1965	Greatest Hits	—	Mercury
1966	There's a Star-Spangled Banner Waving Somewhere	12	Mercury
1966	Lonelyville	6	Mercury
1966	Free and Easy	10	Mercury
1967	My Kind of Love	—	Mercury
1967	Dave Dudley Country	29	Mercury
1968	Greatest Hits Vol. 2	39	Mercury
1968	Thanks for All the Miles	39	Mercury
1969	One More Mile	15	Mercury
1969	George (And the North Woods)	—	Mercury
1970	The Best of Dave Dudley	32	Mercury
1970	The Pool Shark	16	Mercury
1971	Dave Dudley Sings Listen Betty (I'm Singing Your Song)	32	Mercury
1971	Will the Real Dave Dudley Please Sing	27	Mercury
1972	The Original Traveling Man	18	Mercury
1973	Keep On Truckin'	22	Mercury
1975	Special Delivery	—	United Artists
1975	Uncommonly Good Country	13	United Artists
1976	1776	—	United Artists
1976	Presents	—	United Artists
1977	Chrome and Polish	—	Rice
1978	On the Road Again	—	Rice
1980	Interstate Gold	—	Sun
1980	Diesel Duets (w/ Charlie Douglas)	—	Sun
1981	King of the Road	—	Sun
1982	Trucker's Christmas	—	Cetera
1983	20 Great Truck Driver Favorites	—	Plantation
1984	Nashville Rodeo Saloon	—	Bellaphon
1985	Truck Drivin' Man	—	Bellaphon

=== Singles ===
Year	Single	Chart position			Album
Year	Single	US Country	US	CAN Country	Album
1952	"Nashville Blues"	—	—		singles only
1955	"Cry Baby Cry"	—	—		singles only
1956	"Ink Dries Quicker Than Tears"	—	—		singles only
1956	"Rock and Roll Nursery Rhyme"	—	—		singles only
1959	"I Just Want to Be Your Friend"	—	—		singles only
1960	"It's Gotta Be That Way"	—	—		singles only
1961	"Maybe I Do"	28	—		singles only
1962	"Under Cover of the Night"	18	—		singles only
1963	"Six Days on the Road"^{A}	2	32		Dave Dudley Sings Six Days on the Road
1963	"Cowboy Boots"	3	95		Songs About the Working Man
1964	"Last Day in the Mines"	7	125		Songs About the Working Man
1964	"Mad"	6	—	—	Talk of the Town
1965	"Two Six Packs Away"	15	—	—	Truck Drivin' Son-of-a-Gun
1965	"Truck Drivin' Son-of-a-Gun"	3	125	—	Truck Drivin' Son-of-a-Gun
1965	"What We're Fighting For"	4	—	—	There's a Star-Spangled Banner; Waving Somewhere
1966	"Viet Nam Blues"	12	127	—	There's a Star-Spangled Banner; Waving Somewhere
1966	"Lonelyville"	13	—	—	Lonelyville
1966	"Long Time Gone"	15	—	—	Free and Easy
1967	"My Kind of Love"	12	—	—	My Kind of Love
1967	"Trucker's Prayer"	23	—	—	Dave Dudley Country
1967	"Anything Leaving Town Today"	12	—	20	Greatest Hits Vol. 2
1968	"There Ain't No Easy Run"	10	—	5	Thanks for All the Miles
1968	"I Keep Coming Back for More"	14	—	6	Thanks for All the Miles
1968	"Please Let Me Prove (My Love for You)"	10	—	6	One More Mile
1969	"One More Mile"	12	—	—	One More Mile
1969	"George (And the North Woods)"	10	—	4	George (And the North Woods)
1970	"The Pool Shark"	1	—	4	The Pool Shark
1970	"This Night (Ain't Fit for Anything But Drinking)"	20	—	22	The Pool Shark
1970	"Day Drinkin'" (w/ Tom T. Hall)	23	—	20	single only
1971	"Listen Betty (I'm Singing Your Song)"	15	—	5	Dave Dudley Sings Listen Betty (I'm Singing Your Song)
1971	"Comin' Down"	8	—	17	Dave Dudley Sings Listen Betty (I'm Singing Your Song)
1971	"Fly Away Again"	8	—	5	Will the Real Dave Dudley Please Sing
1972	"If It Feels Good Do It"	14	—	26	The Original Traveling Man
1972	"You've Gotta Cry Girl"	12	—	14	The Original Traveling Man
1972	"We Know It's Over" (w/ Karen O'Donnal)	40	—	—	single only
1973	"Keep On Truckin'"	19	—	10	Keep On Truckin'
1973	"It Takes Time"	37	—	27	single only
1973	"Rollin' Rig"	47	—	—	Special Delivery
1974	"Have It Your Way"	67	—	—	Special Delivery
1974	"Counterfeit Cowboy"	61	—	—	Special Delivery
1975	"How Come It Took So Long (To Say Goodbye)"	74	—	—	Special Delivery
1975	"Fireball Rolled a Seven"	21	—	24	Special Delivery
1975	"Wave at 'Em Billy Boy"	—	—	—	Uncommonly Good Country
1975	"Me and Ole C.B."	12	—	8	Uncommonly Good Country
1976	"Sentimental Journey"	47	—	—	Uncommonly Good Country
1976	"1776"	—	—	—	1776
1976	"38 and Lonely"	83	—	—	Presents
1976	"Rooster Hill"	—	—	—	Presents
1977	"Just Memories"	—	—	—	single only
1977	"Devils in Heaven Bound Machines"	—	—	—	Chrome and Polish
1977	"Rollin' On (We Gone)"	—	—	—	Chrome and Polish
1978	"One A.M. Alone"	95	—	—	On the Road Again
1978	"Wayward Wind"	—	—	—	singles only
1979	"Moonlight in Vermont"	—	—	—	singles only
1980	"Last Run"	—	—	—	Interstate Gold
1980	"Big Fanny"	—	—	—	Diesel Duets
1980	"Rolaids, Doan's Pills and Preparation H"	77	—	—	King of the Road
1980	"Driver"	—	—	—	King of the Road
1981	"Eagle"	—	—	—	King of the Road
1981	"I Do"	—	—	—	singles only
1981	"I Was Country Before Barbara Mandrell"	—	—	—	singles only
1983	"I Wish I Had a Nickel"	—	—	—	Nashville Rodeo Saloon

- ^{A}Peaked at number 13 on Easy Listening (now Hot Adult Contemporary Tracks)

== Other sources ==
- Country Music: The Rough Guide; Wolff, Kurt; Penguin Publishing
