= Tom T. Hall =

American country musician (1936–2021)

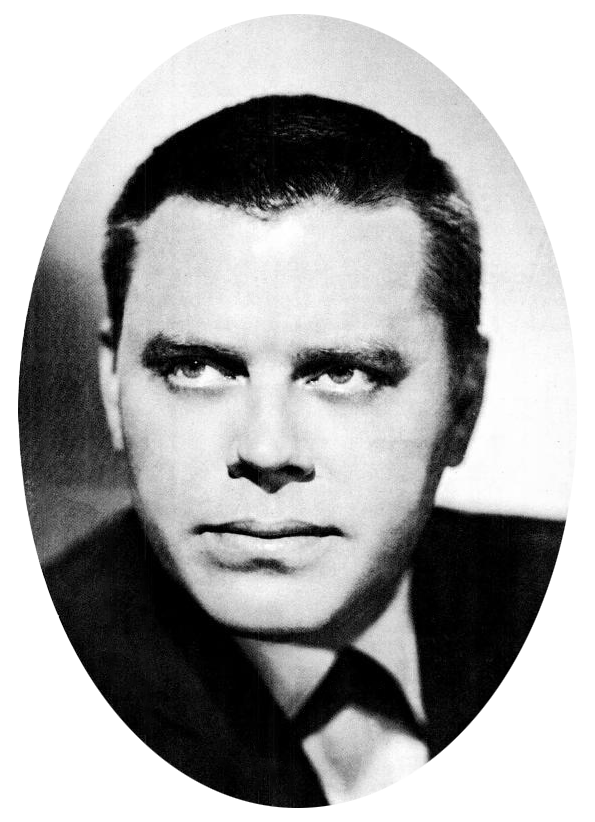
- Hall in 1967

Background information
- Born: Thomas Hall; May 25, 1936; Tick Ridge, Kentucky, U.S.
- Died: August 20, 2021 (aged 85) Franklin, Tennessee, U.S.
- Genres: Country; progressive country
- Occupations: Singer, songwriter, author
- Instruments: Vocals; guitar; banjo; mandolin; piano; saxophone
- Years active: 1963–2011
- Labels: Mercury; RCA Victor; Columbia; Blue Circle

Thomas Hall (May 25, 1936 – August 20, 2021), known professionally as Tom T. Hall and informally nicknamed "the Storyteller", was an American country music singer-songwriter and short-story author. He wrote 12 number-one hit songs, with 26 more that reached the top 10, including the number-one international pop crossover hit "Harper Valley PTA", and "I Love", which reached number 12 on the Billboard Hot 100. He is included in Rolling Stone's list of 100 Greatest Songwriters. He was inducted into the Country Music Hall of Fame in 2008, and the International Bluegrass Music Hall of Fame alongside his wife Dixie in 2018.

== Early life and career ==
Hall was born on Tick Ridge, seven miles south of Olive Hill, Kentucky, on May 25, 1936. As a teenager, he organized a band, called the Kentucky Travelers, which performed before movies for a traveling theater. Hall enlisted in the U.S. Army in 1957, serving in Germany. While in the service, he performed over the Armed Forces Radio Network and wrote comic songs about army experiences. Following his discharge in 1961, he used G.I. Bill educational benefits to enroll at Roanoke College, where he worked as a disc jockey. His early career included being an announcer at WRON, a local radio station in Ronceverte, West Virginia. Hall was also an announcer at WMOR (1330 AM) in Morehead and WGOH (1370 AM) in Grayson, both in Kentucky. Hall was also an announcer at WSPZ, which later became WVRC Radio in Spencer, West Virginia, in the 1960s.

Hall's big songwriting break came in 1963, when country singer Jimmy C. Newman recorded his song "DJ for a Day". In 1964, Hall moved to Nashville and started to work as a $50-a-week songwriter for Newkeys Music, the publishing company belonging to Newman and his business partner, Jimmy Key, writing up to half a dozen country songs per day. Key suggested that he add the middle initial "T" to his name. Hall was nicknamed "The Storyteller", and he composed songs for dozens of country music stars, including Johnny Cash, George Jones, Loretta Lynn, Waylon Jennings, Alan Jackson, and Bobby Bare. He also penned "Hello Vietnam", a song that openly supported the Vietnam War at a time when war-protest songs were beginning to dominate the pop music chart. The song proved to be a hit for country singer Johnnie Wright and was later used by Stanley Kubrick to provide the soundtrack to the barbershop montage that opens his 1987 Vietnam film Full Metal Jacket.

One of Hall's earliest successful songwriting ventures, "Harper Valley PTA", recorded in 1968 by Jeannie C. Riley, hit number one on the Billboard Hot 100 and Hot Country Singles charts a week apart. It sold over six million copies and won both a Grammy Award and a CMA Award. The song went on to inspire a motion picture and television program of the same name. Hall himself recorded the song for his album The Definitive Collection (as track number 23). His recording career took off after Riley's rendition of the song, and he released a number of hits from the late 1960s through the early 1980s. Some of his biggest hits include "A Week in a Country Jail", "(Old Dogs, Children and) Watermelon Wine", "I Love", "Country Is", "The Year Clayton Delaney Died", "I Like Beer", "Faster Horses (the Cowboy and the Poet)", and "That Song Is Driving Me Crazy". One of Hall's best-known numbers, "Pamela Brown", was recorded by Leo Kottke and became a staple of Kottke's performances. Hall is also noted for his child-oriented songs, including "Sneaky Snake" and "I Care", the latter of which hit number one on the country charts in 1975. His song "I Love", in which the narrator lists the things in life that he loves, was recorded by Heathen Dan, with completely altered lyrics, as "I Like" and appeared many times on Dr. Demento's show in the early 1980s. Hall's song was also used with altered lyrics and a hard-rock arrangement in a popular 2003 TV commercial for Coors Light. In the mid- to late 1970s, Hall was a commercial spokesperson for Chevrolet trucks.

Hall succeeded Ralph Emery as host of the syndicated country music TV show Pop! Goes the Country in 1980 and continued until the series ended in 1982. Hall largely retired from writing new material in 1986 and from performing in 1994; his last public performance, which was also his first in several years, was in 2011.

== Awards and honors ==
Hall won the Grammy Award for Best Album Notes in 1973 for the notes he wrote for his album Tom T. Hall's Greatest Hits. He was nominated for, but did not win, the same award in 1976 for his album Greatest Hits Volume 2. He was a member of the Grand Ole Opry from 1971. In 1998, his 1972 song "(Old Dogs, Children and) Watermelon Wine" came in second in a BBC Radio 2 poll to find the UK's favorite easy listening record, despite never having been a hit in the UK and being familiar to Radio 2 listeners mostly through occasional plays by DJ Terry Wogan.

Hall was inducted into the Kentucky Music Hall of Fame in 2002, and into the Country Music Hall of Fame on February 12, 2008. His wait for these honors was longer than anticipated; Hall attributed it to being somewhat reclusive and "not well liked" among the Nashville music industry, noting that he almost never collaborated with other songwriters, and by the 1990s, was largely out of step with the corporate style of country music.

On June 1, 2014, Rolling Stone ranked "(Old Dogs, Children and) Watermelon Wine" at number 93 on its list of the 100 greatest country songs. In November 2018 Hall and his wife Dixie Hall were inducted together into the International Bluegrass Music Hall of Fame. On June 13, 2019, Hall was inducted into the Songwriters Hall of Fame. Of all the honors he had received in his lifetime, he considered this induction to be his proudest moment and the pinnacle of his achievement, also stating that he was taken by surprise for even being considered.

Together with his wife Dixie, he won the Society for the Preservation of Bluegrass Music of America Bluegrass Song Writer of the Year award in 2002, 2003, 2004, 2005, 2007, 2008, 2009, 2010, 2011, 2013, 2014, and 2015.

== Personal life ==
Hall was married in 1961 to Opal "Hootie" McKinney, a native of Grayson, Kentucky. Their son, Dean Todd Hall, was born on June 11, 1961. Dean worked for his father in the early 1980s, first as a roadie and later as a guitarist. Dean has since worked as a solo artist and with Bobby Bare's band.

Hall met bluegrass songwriter Dixie Deen in 1965 at a music-industry award dinner to which she was invited for having written the song "Truck Drivin' Son-of-a-Gun", which became a hit for Dave Dudley. Born Iris Lawrence in the West Midlands, England, in 1934, she emigrated to the U.S. in 1961 and married Hall in 1968, taking the name Dixie Hall. The two were married until her death on January 16, 2015. They lived in Franklin, Tennessee.

== Death ==
At age 85, Hall died at his home in Franklin, Tennessee, on August 20, 2021, of a self-inflicted gunshot wound to the head.

== Selected discography ==
- In Search of a Song (1971)
- We All Got Together and... (1972)
- Places I've Done Time (1978)
- Song in a Seashell (1985)

== Books written by Hall ==
- How I Write Songs, Why You Can (1976), Chappell Music Co. ISBN 978-0882544236
- The Songwriter's Handbook (1976), Rutledge Hill Press ISBN 9781558538603
- The Storyteller's Nashville (1979), Doubleday & Co.; (Spring House Press, 2016), ISBN 978-1-940611-44-0
- The Laughing Man of Woodmont Coves (1982), Doubleday & Co. ISBN 9781557282255
- The Acts of Life (1986), The University of Arkansas Press ISBN 9780938626718
- Spring Hill, Tennessee (1990), Longstreet Press, Inc. ISBN 9780929264738
- What a Book! (1996), Longstreet Press, Inc. ISBN 9781563523403

== See also ==
- Category:Songs written by Tom T. Hall
- Category:Tom T. Hall songs
- Category:Tom T. Hall albums
