= Jerry Kennedy =

American record producer (1940–2026)

Background information
- Born: Jerry Glenn Kennedy; August 10, 1940; Shreveport, Louisiana, U.S.
- Origin: Shreveport, Louisiana, U.S.
- Died: February 11, 2026 (aged 85) Nashville, Tennessee, U.S.
- Genres: Country music, rock and roll
- Occupations: Record producer, songwriter, guitarist
- Instruments: Vocals, guitar, dobro
- Years active: 1961–2026
- Label: Mercury

Jerry Glenn Kennedy (August 10, 1940 – February 11, 2026) was an American record producer, songwriter, and guitarist.

== Early years ==
Kennedy was born in Shreveport, Louisiana, on August 10, 1940. As a child, he recalled "beating on broomsticks and other things" as his initial forays into music-making. His first guitar was a Silvertone, which his parents bought for him when he was "eight or nine." He began taking lessons from a local guitar legend, Tillman Franks. Kennedy attended various shows around the Shreveport area as a boy, including the legendary Louisiana Hayride. One show he particularly remembered attending is Hank Williams's last show at the Shreveport Municipal Auditorium saying, "I was a kid sittin' on the front row."

In 1954, Elvis Presley performed on Louisiana Hayride, and Kennedy was in attendance with a friend. He recalled their frustration with the young girls who screamed incessantly, preventing his friend and him from hearing Scotty Moore, Presley's guitar player, clearly during the performance. "[W]e got mad at all of the girls screamin', because we couldn't hear Scotty when Elvis was doin' his shakin'. It upset us that we couldn't hear the guitar."

== Career ==
Kennedy signed a recording contract with RCA Records at age 11. He subsequently recorded several singles, several of which included contributions by Chet Atkins. Thereafter Kennedy became something of a teen idol at his high school. Though he never became a star as a vocalist, he sang background vocals for several Mercury Records artists as a teenager. After working in recording sessions around Shreveport for several years, he was convinced to move to Nashville by Irving Green, the president of Mercury Records. Kennedy arrived in Nashville just as the country music boom of the 1960s was getting under way. Soon after his arrival, he was asked to work as a talent scout for Mercury's country subsidiary, Smash Records, and to begin producing and also playing in recording sessions.

Kennedy and Tommy Tomlinson, a Louisiana Hayride star from Minden, Louisiana, developed four instrumental albums for Mercury Records in 1960. The albums, titled Tom & Jerry, covering all genres of music, also involved Hank Garland, Boots Randolph, Bob Moore, and Harold Bradley.

The Jerry Kennedy Orchestra participated in the complete recording sessions for Johnny Hallyday in 1962. Five discs were issued from these sessions: Johnny Sings America's Rockin' Hits; The 1962 Nashville Sessions, Vol. 2: The French Recordings, reissued on CD as Nashville Session 62, in 1990; a CD 5 titles of the Club Dial "C'est fini miss Molly" and a CD included in Johnny Hallyday: Le Livre.

He was one of the session musicians used by Bob Dylan in recording his classic album Blonde on Blonde, in 1966.

A recipient of four Grammy Awards, Kennedy's Dobro and guitar playing have been featured on the albums of artists as varied as Elvis Presley, Kris Kristofferson and Ringo Starr. Another famous work by Kennedy on dobro was Jeannie C. Riley's "Harper Valley PTA". Kennedy played on or produced nearly all of the country music records of Jerry Lee Lewis.

In 1968, Shelby Singleton, who had served as something of a mentor to Kennedy, left Smash. Kennedy took the reins, and ran Smash Records until 1970, when Mercury shut down that label and appointed him as the head of Mercury's country music division. His time at Mercury produced memorable hits from country music artists such as Roger Miller, Reba McEntire, The Statler Brothers, Johnny Rodriguez, and Tom T. Hall. Hall, speaking in 1974, credited Kennedy with getting him started in the business. "I had a lot of good songs I couldn't get recorded. Jerry Kennedy of Mercury Records asked me to record them, so I did." After receiving this encouragement from Kennedy, Hall went on to record nine LPs with Mercury Records from 1968 to 1974, including his famous "Harper Valley PTA". Kennedy himself left Mercury in 1984 to start JK Productions, through which he produced recordings by The Statler Brothers, Connie Smith, Mel McDaniel, Reba McEntire and other artists.

In 1987, Kennedy and David Briggs released a track for Mercury Records credited to Joe Kenyon, which was a cover of Vangelis' "Hymne". E & J Gallo Winery used this version in its commercials, and it went to number 33 on Hot Country Songs.

== Personal life and death ==
Kennedy died on February 11, 2026, at the age of 85. He was the father of songwriter, musician and producer Gordon Kennedy.
