= Wynn Stewart discography =

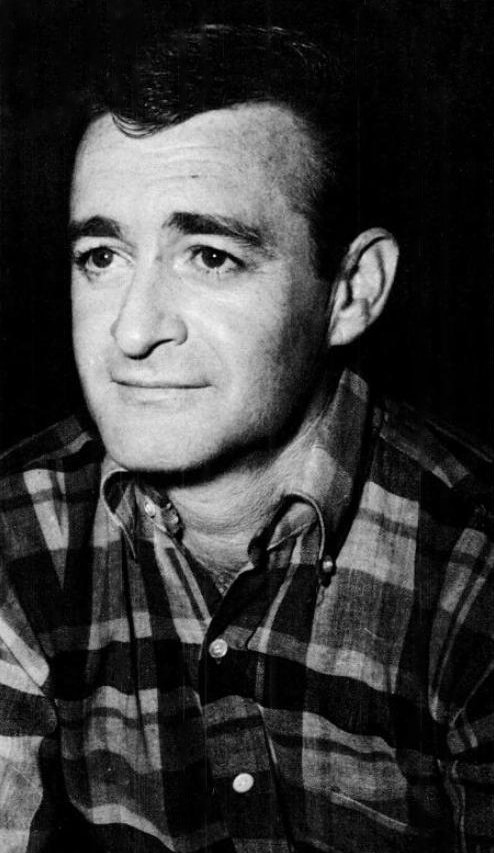
- Wynn Stewart, 1970
- Studio albums: 11
- Compilation albums: 9
- Singles: 50
- B-sides: 1

The discography of American country artist Wynn Stewart contains 11 studio albums, nine compilation albums, 50 singles and one charting B-side single. Stewart signed his first recording contract in 1954, releasing his debut single, "I've Waited a Lifetime." He then briefly signed with Capitol Records, where he had his first charting single with "Waltz of the Angels." The song was a major hit, reaching number 14 on the Billboard Hot Country and Western Sides chart in 1956. His follow-up singles to the hit were not a commercial success and Stewart left Capitol. Stewart then signed with Challenge Records where he adapted a new country style. In 1959, his single "Wishful Thinking" became a major hit. The song was his first to reach the top ten on the country chart, peaking at number five in March 1960. Also in 1960, his duet with Jan Howard became a minor charting single. By December 1961, "Big, Big Love" became his third major hit, climbing to number 18 on the Billboard country chart.

Stewart encountered some professional setbacks and signed back with his former label, Capitol Records in 1965. In 1967, the single "It's Such a Pretty World Today" became the biggest hit of his career. In June 1967, the song reached number one on the Billboard Hot Country Singles chart and spent two weeks there. His second studio album of the same name reached number one on the Billboard Top Country Albums chart in 1967 as well. His musical style shifted again following its success and he went towards a softer Nashville Sound style. Stewart's three follow-up singles all reached the top ten of the country chart: "'Cause I Have You," "Love's Gonna Happen to Me" and "Something Pretty." He also continued to release studio albums. His third album release, Love's Gonna Happen to Me (1967), reached number 13 on the country albums chart. This was followed by Something Pretty (1968), which reached number 28 on the same chart.

Stewart left Capitol in 1971 and moved to RCA Records. He recorded several singles, which only reached minor positions on the Billboard country songs chart. Singles such as "It's Raining in Seattle," only reached the top 60 of the country chart. In 1975, he signed with Playboy Records. In 1976, his single "After the Storm" became a major hit. In October 1976, the single reached number eight on the Billboard country songs chart, becoming his first top ten hit in nearly a decade. Its follow-up single, "Sing a Sad Song," reached the top 20 in 1977. In the late 1970s, Stewart established his own recording label where he released two singles. The first, "Eyes as Big as Dallas," reached the top 40 of the country songs chart. He continued releasing music sporadically before his death in 1985. Posthumously, his final charting single was released called "Wait Till I Get My Hands on You." The song reached number 98 on the Billboard country chart in 1985.

== Albums ==
=== Studio albums ===
List of albums, with selected chart positions, showing other relevant details
Title	Album details	Peak chart positions	
Title	Album details	US	US Coun.
The Songs of Wynn Stewart	Released: September 1965; Label: Capitol; Formats: LP	—	—
It's Such a Pretty World Today	Released: April 1967; Label: Capitol; Formats: LP	158	1
Love's Gonna Happen to Me	Released: November 1967; Label: Capitol; Formats: LP	—	13
Something Pretty	Released: May 1968; Label: Capitol; Formats: LP	—	28
In Love	Released: November 1968; Label: Capitol; Formats: LP	—	—
Let the Whole World Sing It with Me	Released: March 1969; Label: Capitol; Formats: LP	—	41
Yours Forever	Released: October 1969; Label: Capitol; Formats: LP	—	—
You Don't Care What Happens to Me	Released: February 1970; Label: Capitol; Formats: LP	—	—
It's a Beautiful Day	Released: August 1970; Label: Capitol; Formats: LP	—	—
Baby It's Yours	Released: February 1971; Label: Capitol; Formats: LP	—	—
After the Storm	Released: October 1976; Label: Playboy; Formats: LP, cassette	—	24
"—" denotes a recording that did not chart or was not released in that territory.

=== Compilation albums ===
List of compilations albums, showing all relevant details
Title	Album details
Sweethearts of Country Music (with Jan Howard)	Released: 1960; Label: Challenge; Formats: LP
Wynn Stewart	Released: 1962; Label: Wrangler; Formats: LP
Wishful Thinking: The Challenge Years 1958–1963	Released: 1988; Label: Bear Family; Formats: LP
California Country: The Best of the Challenge Years	Released: 1995; Label: AVI; Formats: CD
Wishful Thinking	Released: August 22, 2000; Label: Bear Family; Formats: CD
The Very Best of Wynn Stewart: 1958–1962	Released: June 5, 2001; Label: Varèse Sarabande; Formats: CD
The Very Best of Wynn Stewart & Jan Howard (with Jan Howard)	Released: August 10, 2004; Label: Varèse Sarabande; Formats: CD
Greatest Country Hits	Released: November 10, 2009; Label: Micro Werks; Formats: CD
Come On	Released: November 22, 2011; Label: Bear Family; Formats: CD

== Singles ==
=== As lead artist ===
List of singles, with selected chart positions, and other relevant details
Title	Year	Peak chart positions		Album
Title	Year	US Coun.	CAN Coun.	Album
"I've Waited a Lifetime"	1954	—	—	—N/a
"Waltz of the Angels"	1956	14	—	—N/a
"The Keeper of the Keys"	1956	—	—	—N/a
"That Just Kills Me"	1956	—	—	—N/a
"Hold Back Tomorrow"	1957	—	—	—N/a
"I Wish I Could Say the Same"	1957	—	—	—N/a
"Come On"	1958	—	—	—N/a
"Above and Beyond (The Call of Love)"	1959	—	—	—N/a
"Wishful Thinking"	1959	5	—	—N/a
"Playboy"	1960	—	—	—N/a
"I'd Rather Have America"	1960	—	—	—N/a
"Big, Big Love"	1961	18	—	—N/a
"I Don't Feel at Home"	1962	—	—	—N/a
"Loversville"	1962	—	—	—N/a
"Another Day, Another Dollar"	1962	27	—	—N/a
"I'm Not the Man I Used to Be"	1963	—	—	—N/a
"Big City"	1963	—	—	—N/a
"Half of This, Half of That"	1964	30	—	The Songs of Wynn Stewart
"Sha-Marie"	1965	—	—	The Songs of Wynn Stewart
"I Keep Forgettin' That I Forgot About You"	1965	43	—	It's Such a Pretty World Today
"Angels Don't Lie"	1966	—	—	It's Such a Pretty World Today
"It's Such a Pretty World Today"	1967	1	—	It's Such a Pretty World Today
"'Cause I Have You"	1967	9	—	It's Such a Pretty World Today
"Love's Gonna Happen to Me"	1967	7	—	Love's Gonna Happen to Me
"Something Pretty"	1968	10	20	Something Pretty
"In Love"	1968	16	14	In Love
"Strings"	1968	29	—	Let the Whole World Sing It with Me
"Let the Whole World Sing It with Me"	1969	20	—	Let the Whole World Sing It with Me
"World-Wide Travelin' Man"	1969	19	—	Let the Whole World Sing It with Me
"Yours Forever"	1969	47	—	Yours Forever
"You Don't Care What Happens to Me"	1970	55	—	You Don't Care What Happens to Me
"It's a Beautiful Day"	1970	13	33	It's a Beautiful Day
"Heavenly"	1970	32	—	It's a Beautiful Day
"Baby It's Yours"	1971	55	—	Baby It's Yours
"Hello Little Rock"	1971	53	—	Baby It's Yours
"Paint Me a Rainbow"	1972	49	—	—N/a
"Everything Needs a Little Woman's Touch"	1973	—	—	—N/a
"Love Ain't Worth a Dime Unless It's Free"	1973	51	—	—N/a
"It's Raining in Seattle"	1973	62	—	—N/a
"Lonely Rain"	1975	80	—	After the Storm
"I'm Gonna Kill You"	1976	—	—	After the Storm
"After the Storm"	1976	8	—	After the Storm
"Sing a Sad Song"	1976	19	32	After the Storm
"Eyes as Big as Dallas"	1978	37	—	—N/a
"Could I Talk You Back into Loving Me Again"	1979	59	—	—N/a
"Wishful Drinkin'"	1983	—	—	—N/a
"Wait Till I Get My Hands on You"	1985	98	—	—N/a
"—" denotes a recording that did not chart or was not released in that territory.

=== As a collaborative artist ===
List of singles, with selected chart positions, and other relevant details
Title	Year	Peak chart positions	Album
Title	Year	US Country	Album
"Yankee Go Home" (with Jan Howard)	1958	—	—N/a
"Wrong Company" (with Jan Howard)	1960	26	—N/a
"Wild Side of Life" (with Johnny Paycheck)	1985	—	—N/a
"—" denotes a recording that did not chart or was not released in that territory.

== Other charted songs ==
List of songs, showing selected chart positions and other relevant details
Title	Year	Peak chart positions	Album	Notes
Title	Year	US Country	Album	Notes
"That's the Only Way to Cry"	1967	68	Love's Gonna Happen to Me	(Note: "That's Only Way to Cry" was released as the B-side to the single "Cause I Have You.")
