= After the Storm (Wynn Stewart song) =

Single by Wynn Stewart

from the album After the Storm
- B-side: "Don't Monkey with My Widow"
- Released: July 1976
- Recorded: November 4, 1975
- Studio: RCA Victor Studio
- Genre: Country; Bakersfield Sound
- Length: 2:37
- Label: Playboy
- Songwriter(s): Dale Noe
- Producer(s): Eddie Kilroy

Wynn Stewart singles chronology
"I'm Gonna Kill You" (1976)	"After the Storm" (1976)	"Sing a Sad Song" (1976)

"After the Storm" is a song written by Dale Noe. It was recorded by American country artist Wynn Stewart. It was released as a single in 1976 and became a major hit that same year. "After the Storm" was Stewart's first major hit in five years and returned him to the national charts after several unsuccessful singles. It spawned the release of a new studio album as well as additional singles following its release.

== Background, release and reception ==
"After the Storm" was composed by Dale Noe, who had previously written several singles for Stewart. This included his 1967 number one hit, "It's Such a Pretty World Today" and the 1969 top 20 hit "Let the Whole World Sing It with Me." "After the Storm" was recorded at the RCA Victor Studio, located in Nashville, Tennessee. Six additional tracks were recorded during the same session on November 4, 1975. This included a remake of his 1967 number one single. The recording session was produced by Eddie Kilroy. Stewart had just begun working with Kilroy and it was his second session with him.

"After the Storm" was released as a single on Playboy Records in July 1976. It was Stewart's third single release with the label. His previous release had not charted while his first release, "Lonely Rain", peaked outside the country top 40. The single spent 14 weeks on the Billboard Hot Country Singles chart, peaking at number eight as well in October 1976. "After the Storm" was Stewart's first major hit in over five years. His last major hit had been 1970's "It's a Beautiful Day." It was also his first top ten single in eight years. His previous had been 1968's "Something Pretty."

Since its release, "After the Storm" has been considered Stewart's "comeback" song in his career. Writer Stephen Thomas Erlewine of Allmusic gave the song a positive response when reviewing his 1976 album of the same. He called the song "a fine comeback" in regard to the rest of the album. In comparison with the other featured tracks on his 1976 album, Erlewine called "After the Storm" a song that represented a more pop sound.

== Track listing ==
7" vinyl single

- "After the Storm" – 2:37
- "Don't Monkey with My Widow" – 2:42

== Chart performance ==
Chart (1976)	Peak position
US Hot Country Songs (Billboard)	8
