= It's Such a Pretty World Today (album) =

Studio album by Wynn Stewart
- Released: April 1967
- Recorded: 1965–1967
- Studio: Capitol (Hollywood)
- Genre: Country; Bakersfield Sound
- Length: 32:11
- Label: Capitol
- Producer: Ken Nelson

Wynn Stewart chronology
The Songs of Wynn Stewart (1965)	It's Such a Pretty World Today (1967)	Love's Gonna Happen to Me (1967)

Singles from It's Such a Pretty World Today
- 1. "I Keep Forgettin' That I Forgot About You" Released: August 1965; 2. "Angels Don't Lie" Released: February 1966; 3. "It's Such a Pretty World Today" Released: January 1967; 4. "Cause I Have You" Released: June 1967

It's Such a Pretty World Today is a studio album by American country artist Wynn Stewart. It was released in April 1967 via Capitol Records and was produced by Ken Nelson. It was Stewart's second studio release in his recording career and contained 12 tracks. The album's name was derived from its title track, which became a number one hit in 1967. Although not written by Stewart, other songs on the album were self-composed and contained new material that was previously unreleased. The album reached charting positions on the Billboard surveys as well.

== Background and content ==
The album was Stewart's second for the Capitol label. Stewart had previously recorded for Challenge Records, where he had three charting records including the major hit, "Wishful Thinking." However, after opening a nightclub, which eventually closed, he left Challenge and signed with Capitol. He had been recording for Capitol for two years when It's Such a Pretty World Today was cut in the studio.

The material recorded for the album was cut between 1965 and 1967 at the Capitol Recording Studio, located in Hollywood, California. The sessions were produced by Ken Nelson. Altogether, the project consisted of 12 tracks, six of which were self-written by Stewart himself. Among these songs was the single "Cause I Have You," as well as "Out There Is the World," "You Told Him" and "Unfaithful Arms." Also included was songs composed by others. Among these is "I Keep Forgettin' That I Forgot About You," which was composed by singer-songwriter Liz Anderson. "Let's Pretend We're Kids" was composed by Bobby Wayne.

== Release and reception ==
Before the release of It's Such a Pretty World Today, three singles were issued between 1965 and 1967. The first was "I Keep Forgettin' That I Forgot About You," which was released in August 1965. The single spent seven weeks on the Billboard Hot Country Singles chart before only reaching number 43 in November 1967. A second single was issued in February 1966, the track "Angels Don't Die." However, the song failed to chart any Billboard publications. The lack of initial single success potentially caused the album's delay in release. However, in January 1967, the title track of the album was issued as a radio single. Spending 22 weeks on the Billboard Hot Country Singles chart, it peaked at number one in June 1967. The song was Stewart's biggest hit and only number one single in his recording career.

After the title track's success, It's Such a Pretty World Today was released in April 1967. It was issued as a vinyl LP, containing six songs on each side of the record. The album was also successful on the Billboard charts, spending 25 weeks on the Top Country Albums survey before also reaching number one in August 1967. The record was also his only number one Billboard album. It was also his only album to chart on the Billboard 200 record list. Spending eight weeks charting, it reached a peak of number 158 in September 1967. Upon its release, the album received reception Billboard magazine's July issue. It was listed as one of their "New Action Breakout" LP's for its success on their chart publications that year. One final single was spawned following the release of the album and after the title track's success. "Cause I Have You" was issued as a single in June 1967. The song spent 16 weeks on the Billboard country songs chart before reaching number nine in September. "Cause I Have You" became Stewart's third top ten hit as an artist.

== Track listing ==
Side one
No.	Title	Writer(s)	Length
1.	"It's Such a Pretty World Today"	Dale Noe	2:30
2.	"Angels Don't Die"	Noe	2:48
3.	"Cause I Have You"	Wynn Stewart, Don Sessions	2:32
4.	"Out There Is Your World"	Jay Rogers; Stewart	2:55
5.	"The Tourist"	Curtis Leach; Stewart	3:21
6.	"I Keep Forgettin' That I Forgot About You"	Liz Anderson	2:17

Side two
No.	Title	Writer(s)	Length
1.	"Let's Pretend We're Kids Again"	Dave Pittman; Bobby Wayne	2:46
2.	"You Told Him"	Bozo Darnell	2:46
3.	"Unfaithful Arms"	Stewart	2:59
4.	"Ol' What's Her Name"	Fuzzy Owen	2:42
5.	"You Can Always Give Her Back to Me"	Pittman; Wayne	2:31
6.	"Halfway in Love"	Leach; Stewart	2:04

== Personnel ==
All credits are adapted from the liner notes of It's Such a Pretty World Today.

Musical personnel

- David Allen – drums
- Bobby Austin – bass
- Buddy Cagle – guitar
- Jimmy Collins – steel guitar
- Eddie Drake – guitar
- George French – piano
- Dennis Hromek – bass
- The Anita Kerr Singers – background vocals
- Ralph Mooney – steel guitar
- Roy Nichols – guitar
- Bob Pierce – piano
- Helen Price – drums
- Roy Staggs – guitar
- Wynn Stewart – lead vocals
- Bobby Wayne – guitar
- Red Wooten – bass

Technical personnel

- Ken Nelson – producer
- Ken Veeder – cover photo

== Chart performance ==
Chart (1967)	Peak position
US Billboard 200	158
US Top Country Albums (Billboard)	1

== Release history ==
Region	Date	Format	Label	Ref.
Canada	April 1967	Vinyl	Capitol Records	
United States	April 1967	Vinyl	Capitol Records	
