= Wrong Company =

Single by Wynn Stewart and Jan Howard
- B-side: "We'll Never Love Again"
- Released: March 1960
- Genre: Country; Bakersfield Sound
- Length: 2:13
- Label: Challenge
- Songwriter(s): Harlan Howard
- Producer(s): Joe Johnson

Wynn Stewart singles chronology
"Wishful Thinking" (1960)	"Wrong Company" (1960)	"Playboy" (1960)

Jan Howard singles chronology
"The One You Slip Around With" (1959)	"Wrong Company" (1960)	"If Your Conscience Can't Stop You (How Can I)" (1960)

"Wrong Company" is a song written by Harlan Howard that was recorded as a duet by American country artists Wynn Stewart and Jan Howard. Released as a single, it reached the top 30 of the US country chart in 1960. It was among several recordings made by the duo but was their only charting song. The song received a positive response from music publications and authors following its release.

== Background ==
Wynn Stewart was considered one of country music's "leading figures" in their California Bakersfield Sound sub-genre. His 1956 single "Waltz of the Angels" reached the US country top 20 but could not follow the success. Instead, he signed with a new record label from the help of songwriter Harlan Howard. Meanwhile, Harlan's wife, Jan Howard, had recently begun a recording career and the couple's friendship with Stewart led to the pair singing duets. Producer Joe Johnson at Challenge Records believed the pair could have success and started recording them. Among their duets was the song "Wrong Company", which had been written by Harlan Howard.

== Release, critical reception and chart performance ==
"Wrong Company" was released as a single by Challenge Records in March 1960. It was distributed as a seven-inch vinyl single and featured a B-side called "We'll Never Love Again" (also a duet between the pairing). The song received a positive response by music publications following its release. Billboard magazine found the song to be "an emotion packed reading" while Cash Box called it a "poignant, middle beat weeper". In his book Country Music: The Rough Guide, Kurt Wolff wrote that "Wrong Company" was among Stewart's "strongest" recordings. "Wrong Company" made its debut on the US Billboard Hot Country Songs chart on May 30, 1960, and spent two weeks there, reaching the number 26 position there. It was the duo's only charting single together despite several recordings made.

== Track listing ==
7" vinyl single

- "Wrong Company" – 2:13
- "We'll Never Love Again" – 2:28

== Charts ==
=== Weekly charts ===
Weekly chart performance for "Wrong Company"
Chart (1960)	Peak position
US Hot Country Songs (Billboard)	26
