= Let the Whole World Sing It with Me (album) =

Studio album by Wynn Stewart and The Tourists
- Released: March 1969
- Recorded: 1968–1969
- Studio: Capitol (Hollywood)
- Genre: Country; Bakersfield Sound
- Label: Capitol
- Producer: Ken Nelson

Wynn Stewart and The Tourists chronology
In Love (1968)	Let the Whole World Sing It with Me (1969)	Yours Forever (1969)

Singles from Let the Whole World Sing It with Me
- 1. "Strings" Released: November 1968; 2. "Let the Whole World Sing It with Me" Released: March 1969; 3. "World-Wide Travelin' Man" Released: June 1969

Let the Whole World Sing It with Me is a studio album by American country artist Wynn Stewart. His band, The Tourists, received equal credit on the billing as well. It was released in March 1969 via Capitol Records and was produced by Ken Nelson. It was Stewart's sixth studio album in his music career and spawned a total of three singles. Two of these singles became hits on the Billboard country chart.

== Background and content ==
Let the Whole World Sing It with Me was recorded between 1968 and 1969 at the Capitol Recording Studio, located in Hollywood, California. Like his previous Capitol releases, the record was produced by Ken Nelson. Nelson had been Stewart's long time producer at the label. The album contained a total of 11 tracks, unlike his previous releases, which contained 12. Four of the album's songs were written (or co-written) by Stewart. This included the single, "Strings," and a re-recording of a former single, "The Keeper of the Key." The latter had been co-written with Harlan Howard. Another re-recording is Stewart's hit "Wishful Thinking." The album's title track had been written by Dale Noe. It was Noe who had previously written many of Stewart's Capitol hits, including hits on his last release. This also includes his number single from 1967, "It's Such a Pretty World Today."

== Release and reception ==
Let the Whole World Sing It with Me was released in March 1969 on Capitol Records. It became Stewart's sixth studio release in his recording career and sixth for the Capitol label. It was Stewart's fourth album to chart on the Billboard Top Country Albums survey. Spending three weeks on the chart, it peaked at number 41 in May 1969. The album produced three singles, starting with "Strings," which was issued in November 1968. The song became a top 40 single in February 1969, peaking at number 29 on the Billboard Hot Country Singles chart. The title track was issued as the next single release in March 1969. The song became a major hit after it peaked at number 20 on the Billboard country songs list in June 1969. The album's third and final single, "World-Wide Travelin' Man," was released in June 1969. Spending ten weeks charting, the single became a major hit after reaching number 19 on the country chart in September 1969. Let the Whole World Sing It with Me was reviewed positively by Billboard magazine in April 1969. Writers called the songs on the album "intriguing" and "upbeat." They also praised Stewart's cover of a Cindy Walker-penned tune.

== Track listing ==
Side one
No.	Title	Writer(s)	Length
1.	"Let the Whole World Sing It with Me"	Dale Noe	2:45
2.	"Who Are You"	Bobby George; Wynn Stewart	2:45
3.	"World-Wide Travelin' Man"	Vern Stovall	1:58
4.	"The Keeper of the Key"	Harlan Howard; Stewart	2:26
5.	"You're Everything to Me"	Tommy Collins; Raymond Rush	2:23
6.	"All of a Sudden"	Gene Price	2:28

Side two
No.	Title	Writer(s)	Length
1.	"Strings"	Bobby Bishop; Wynn Stewart	2:29
2.	"Let's Invest in a Little Bit of Love"	Russell Steagall	2:08
3.	"I Was Just Walking Out the Door"	Cindy Walker	2:16
4.	"Wishful Thinking"	Stewart	2:27
5.	"Run Away"	George	2:25

== Personnel ==
All credits are adapted from the liner notes of Let the Whole World Sing It with Me.

Musical personnel

- David Allen – drums
- Tommy Collins – guitar
- Bobby George – guitar
- Dennis Hromek – bass
- Ralph Mooney – steel guitar
- Bob Morris – bass
- Dale Noe – guitar
- Bob Pierce – piano
- Helen Price – drums
- Wynn Stewart – lead vocals
- Bobby Wayne – guitar
- Clarence White – guitar

Technical personnel

- Ken Nelson – producer

== Chart performance ==
Chart (1969)	Peak position
US Top Country Albums (Billboard)	41

== Release history ==
Region	Date	Format	Label	Ref.
United States	March 1969	Vinyl	Capitol Records	
