= Ralph Mooney =

American pedal steel guitarist

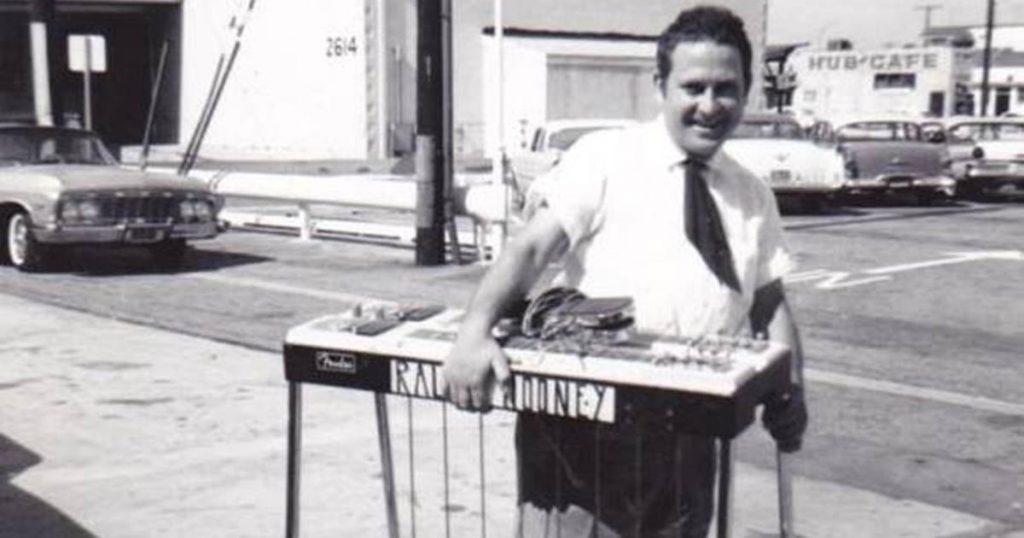
- Ralph Mooney in 1969

Background information
- Born: September 16, 1928
- Origin: Duncan, Oklahoma
- Died: March 20, 2011 (aged 82)
- Genre: Country
- Occupations: Steel guitarist, songwriter
- Instrument: Steel guitar
- Years active: 1950s-1990s
- Formerly of: The Strangers, the Waylors

Ralph Mooney (September 16, 1928 – March 20, 2011) was an American steel guitar player and songwriter, he was inducted into the Steel Guitar Hall of Fame in 1983. He was the original steel guitarist in Merle Haggard's band, the Strangers and Waylon Jennings's band, the Waylors.

A native of Duncan, Oklahoma, Mooney became a key figure in the country music scene around Bakersfield, California. He played on many records associated with the Bakersfield sound, including Wynn Stewart's "Wishful Thinking", Buck Owens' "Under Your Spell Again" and Merle Haggard's "Swinging Doors". He and guitarist James Burton released an instrumental album called Corn Pickin' and Slick Slidin' in 1968.

Mooney played with many other country artists and was a member of Waylon Jennings' band for two decades. Jennings would often transition to Mooney's instrumentals with the lyrics, "Pick it, Moon".

Though best known for his instrumental work, Mooney co-wrote "Crazy Arms" with Chuck Seals; the song was Ray Price's first No. 1 country hit in 1956. Mooney said he wrote the song in 1949 while living in Las Vegas, getting the idea after his wife left him because of his drinking problem.

Tyler Mahan Coe dedicated a full episode of his podcast Cocaine & Rhinestones to Mooney.

Ry Cooder references Mooney in the title track of his 2018 album The Prodigal Son.

== Early years ==
Ralph Mooney was born in Duncan, Oklahoma, in 1928. At the age of 12, he moved to California to live with his sister and her husband; that brother-in-law would begin teaching Mooney to play guitar, fiddle, and mandolin. Around this time, he heard Leon McAuliffe's playing "Steel Guitar Rag" and became fascinated with the pedal steel guitar. He learned to play the number on his flat top guitar, using a knife as a slide. Once Ralph learned what type of instrument McAuliffe was playing, he built his own. Leo Fender would later borrow this instrument to study its design Ralph began playing in local bands including Merl Lindsey And His Oklahoma Nightriders, and eventually joined Skeets McDonald's band, with whom he made his first recordings.

== Career ==
=== Wynn Stewart ===
By 1950, Ralph had become a regular in the house band for the popular Squeakin' Deacon radio show in Los Angeles. Squeakin' Deacon held a weekly talent contest at the Compton Ballroom. A young singer named Winford Stewart took first place so frequently that he shortened his name to "Win". Ralph joined Wynn's band, playing with them around Los Angeles, Bakersfield, and Las Vegas, and joining Stewart in the studio when the singer got his first record deal on Intro Records. Stewart cut two singles, "I've Waited a Lifetime" (with Mooney playing lead guitar instead of pedal steel) and "Strolling". Neither song charted, but the latter caught the attention of Skeets McDonald, who liked it so much he cut it himself (with Ralph playing pedal steel) and got Stewart an audition with Capitol records Ralph continued to play with Stewart on the singer's sessions for Capitol, including Stewart's first major hit "Waltz of the Angels." During this time, Ralph gained session work for other singers as well, playing pedal steel on singles for Terry Fell, Glen Glenn and Wanda Jackson as well as more sessions for Skeets McDonald.

=== "Crazy Arms" ===
In the early 1950s, while Ralph was working with Wynn Stewart and living in Las Vegas, Ralph's wife left him because he was getting "crawling, falling down" drunk. According to Mooney, the experience inspired him to write "Crazy Arms" with his friend Chuck Seals. The song was recorded in 1954 by Wynn Stewart, but that version was never released. Ralph sold the song to Claude Caviness, who formed Pep Records in hopes of finding a hit for his singing wife Marilyn Kaye. Caviness and Kaye, backed by Kenny Brown and the Arkansas Ramblers, cut a duet version of "Crazy Arms" in 1955. Despite criticisms of Kaye's vocals, the single received some radio play, notably at WALT in Tampa, Florida. When rising country star Ray Price visited the station, disc jockey Bob Martin played him the record, recommending that Price record it himself.

Ray Price cut "Crazy Arms" in 1956, reworking some lyrics and adding a walking bassline in 4/4 time. The single was Price's first to hit #1 on Billboard's country charts, where it remained for 20 weeks, establishing the tune's country shuffle feel as a part of Price's signature sound. Following Price's success, the song has been covered countless times. Just weeks after its original release, Jerry Lee Lewis recorded it for his Sun Records debut, and it was later a top 20 hit for both Marion Worth and WIllie Nelson. Mooney said of the song, "It has been recorded by so many different people. I would starve to death if it wasn’t for those royalty checks."

=== Buck Owens ===
In the latter half of the 1950s, Ralph continued to play with Wynn Stewart, but Stewart's drinking and erratic behavior made this work unreliable. Mooney played in other bands and took session work. He was hired as a staff musician for Capitol Records, where in 1958 he began playing sessions with Buck Owens. Ralph played Owens' first session after successfully confronting Capitol for creative control of his recordings; Owens' favorite song from the session is "Second Fiddle". Capitol wouldn't release the song until the following year, but when they did, it reached #24 on the country chart, giving Owens his first hit. Owens' next three singles, "Under Your Spell Again", "Above and Beyond," and "Excuse Me (I Think I've Got a Heartache)", each featuring Mooney's playing, reached numbers 4, 3, and 2, respectively. Ralph continued to play on hit-generating sessions for Buck Owens through 1962, becoming such a fixture in Owens' sound that in 1963, when Owens assembled the band that would become the Buckaroos, he selected Jay McDonald to play pedal steel because McDonald "could mimic the way Ralph Mooney played, so he was just the person I needed to help make what we played onstage sound like my records sounded."

=== Merle Haggard ===
In the early 1960s, Ralph continued to play and record with Wynn Stewart, cutting a few top 40 country singles including "Big, Big Love," Another Day, Another Dollar," and "Half of This, Half of That". By 1961, Wynn Stewart was part owner of the Nashville Nevada Club in Las Vegas. His band, including Ralph Mooney, were the house band. The Nashville Nevada Club was open 24 hours, making it a popular night spot for musicians after their sets were over. In 1962, Merle Haggard was in the crowd while the band played a set without Stewart, when guitarist Roy Nichols recognized him and called him on stage, handed him a guitar, and told him to play while Nichols went to the bathroom. Mooney asked Haggard if he could sing, Merle said "Sure", and the band ran through a few Marty Robbins songs, ending with "Devil Woman." Haggard said that song was one that "You won't hear too many guys singing because it's got a high note in there that will embarrass you if you don't hit it." As the song ended, Haggard saw Stewart watching from the crowd. Stewart was impressed enough to offer Haggard a job playing bass and singing backup on the spot. Haggard accepted and played with Stewart's band until he got his own record deal with Capitol in 1963. His first Capitol single, "Sing a Sad Song" was a Wynn Stewart composition. Mooney and the rest of Wynn's band played on the session, and the single reached #19 on the country chart. Haggard's next single, "Sam Hill," charted but failed to reach the top 40, but it did well enough that Haggard quit Stewart's band and moved back to Bakersfield to pursue his own career.

Haggard's band, prominently billed on his early album covers as the Strangers, was essentially the Nashville Nevada Club house band. Mooney would play on Haggard's first four albums, all of which were top 10 country hits, with Swinging Doors and the Bottle Let Me Down and Branded Man/I Threw Away the Rose both reaching #1. By the mid-1960s, Wynn Stewart's drinking had left his band at loose ends, and Mooney went on tour with Haggard. Mooney's stint as a full-time Stranger was short-lived. In 1967, the band was caught in a snow storm in Minneapolis; Mooney, tired of the hotel, tried to steal the Strangers' tour bus and drive it home himself. He was stopped and sent home.

=== Waylon Jennings ===
Mooney spent the last years of the 1960s doing sessions work, recording an instrumental album with James Burton, and sporadically playing with Wynn Stewart. Stewart had re-signed to Capitol Records in 1965, and in 1967 he released his only #1 single, "It's Such a Pretty World Today." Mooney did not play on the song, but he continued to play with Stewart's band, and the single's success meant that their Las Vegas shows were now in larger, nicer venues instead of clubs and honky tonks. With Stewart typically doing two sets a night, Mooney and Roy Nichols would often spend the time between sets playing for their own entertainment. One such session at the Golden Nugget was overheard by drummer Richie Albright, who introduced Mooney to his boss, Waylon Jennings.

Ralph Mooney joined Jennings' studio and touring band the Waylors in late 1970, at a time when Waylon was growing frustrated with RCA Records' restrictive control over his recording sessions. By 1973, the singer had negotiated a new contract that included the freedom to produce his own records, which meant recording with his own band. The resulting album, Lonesome, On'ry and Mean. is considered a pivotal moment in the development of outlaw country. Mooney would go on to play every pedal steel part on Jennings' albums until 1987, as well as most of the dobro parts, occasionally on the same song, as on "You Ask Me To". He also played on several albums for Jennings' wife, Jessi Colter, contributing to her crossover hit "I'm Not Lisa."

Waylon effusively praised Mooney's playing over the years. On Waylon Live, he calls Mooney "the most imitated steel guitar player and the best one by far...the great Ralph Mooney." In the singer's autobiography, he says, "The band could do just about anything...Mooney was at the heart of it. He was a cult legend in his own right, a steel-guitar genius, and he was in his heyday." Richie Albright recalls Waylon saying, "Hell, there's only one steel guitar player, and it's Ralph Mooney." Waylon often called attention to Mooney during shows and even on record. He would call out "Pick it, Moon!" as Mooney began a solo, and the singer made sly references to Mooney's earlier career, prompting Mooney on Waylon Live to "Show 'em the foot that made Merle Haggard a star," or saying, "Eat your heart out Haggard," on I've Always Been Crazy's cover of Haggard's hit "Tonight the Bottle Let Me Down."

=== Later career ===
Mooney continued to play with Waylon Jennings through most of the 1980s. He did occasional session work as well, playing on Neil Young's Old Ways, Marty Stuart's Hillbilly Rock and two of the last albums Buck Owens recorded, Hot Dog! and Act Naturally. Though never a prolific songwriter, he landed another composition in the charts in 1983 when a Johnny Rodriguez recording of Mooney's "Foolin'" went to #4. That same year he was inducted into the Steel Guitar Hall of Fame, In 1985, Wynn Stewart died of a heart attack at the age of 51. In 1988, Mooney himself had a heart attack; he quit drinking and smoking, and by the 1990s he had mostly retired. He still made regular appearances at the International Steel Guitar Convention in St. Louis, Missouri.

In 2010, Marty Stuart invited Mooney to Nashville to play on Stuart's Ghost Train: The Studio B Sessions. Mooney played steel on the album, co-wrote a song with Stuart, and delivered an instrumental version of his own "Crazy Arms." Stuart called Mooney "the most important picker that ever came through my life."

== Death ==
In January 2011, rumors circulated that Mooney's health was deteriorating. On March 20, 2011, Mooney died of complications from cancer. He was survived by his wife of 62 years, Wanda; his son, Richard; his daughter, Linda Yates; four grandchildren and three great-grandchildren ( Alex Dooley, Elizabeth Dooley, and Jesse Lowry ).

== Equipment ==
Mooney began playing pedal steel on a homemade instrument. According to Bobbe Seymour, this began as a Magnatone double eight-string nonpedal steel guitar, which Mooney modified with household materials. He was quoted as saying that the pedals were held in place with chicken wire strung between the legs; according to steel player Mike Neer, Mooney took this instrument to a session for Wanda Jackson, who saw him setting it up and said to her producer, "You better go get me someone who could play." Leo Fender borrowed this modified instrument to study the design, giving Mooney a Fender model to play.

By 1961, Mooney was using a Fender 1000, another dual eight-string model, through a Fender Twin amplifier on sessions for Buck Owens. Mooney primarily used the E9 neck of the instrument; the second neck, rarely used, was set up with a dobro-style open G tuning instead of the C6 more commonly used by other players.

In the 1970s, after joining Waylon Jennings' band, Mooney was gifted a double-neck Sho-Bud, which maintained the setup and tuning he had developed, including custom-wound pickups designed to emulate the sound of his Fender. Bobbe Seymour recalls a later guitar commissioned by Waylon and the band as a surprise for Mooney. Seymour said this was a Super-Pro model with an E9 tuning the near neck and that the outside neck was tuned "like a G dobro."

At some point after this, Mooney began using instruments made by GFI, a company founded by Gene Fields, who worked as a designer at Fender during the development of their pedal steel line.

== Selected discography ==
- James Burton and Ralph Mooney – Corn Pickin' and Slick Slidin' (Capitol Records, 1968)

With Wynn Stewart

- The Songs of Wynn Stewart (Capitol Records, 1965)
- It's Such a Pretty World Today (Capitol Records, 1967)
- Something Pretty (Capitol Records, 1968)
- Let the Whole World Sing It with Me (Capitol Records, 1969)

With Buck Owens

- Buck Owens (Capitol Records, 1961)
- Buck Owens Sings Harlan Howard (Capitol Records, 1961)
- On the Bandstand (Capitol Records, 1963)
- Hot Dog! (Capitol Records, 1988)
- Act Naturally (Capitol Records, 1989)

With Merle Haggard

- Strangers (Capitol Records, 1965)
- Swinging Doors and the Bottle Let Me Down (Capitol Records, 1966)
- I'm a Lonesome Fugitive (Capitol Records, 1967)
- Branded Man (Capitol Records, 1967)

With Waylon Jennings

- Ladies Love Outlaws (RCA Nashville, 1972)
- Lonesome, On'ry and Mean (RCA Victor, 1973)
- Honky Tonk Heroes (RCA Victor, 1973)
- This Time (RCA Victor, 1974)
- The Ramblin' Man (RCA Victor, 1974)
- Dreaming My Dreams (RCA Victor, 1975)
- Are You Ready for the Country (RCA Victor, 1976)
- Waylon Live (RCA Victor, 1976)
- Ol' Waylon (RCA Victor, 1977)
- I've Always Been Crazy (RCA Victor, 1978)
- What Goes Around Comes Around (RCA Victor, 1979)
- Music Man (RCA Victor, 1980)
- Black on Black (RCA Victor, 1982)
- Never Could Toe the Mark (RCA Victor, 1984)
- Turn the Page (RCA Victor, 1985)
- Sweet Mother Texas (RCA Victor, 1986)
- Hangin' Tough (MCA, 1987)
- A Man Called Hoss (MCA, 1987)

With Jessi Colter

- I'm Jessi Colter (Capitol Records, 1975)
- Jessi (Capitol Records, 1976)
- Diamond in the Rough (Capitol Records, 1976)
- Mirriam (Capitol Records, 1977)
- That's the Way a Cowboy Rocks and Rolls (Capitol Records, 1978)

With Marty Stuart

- Hillbilly Rock (MCA, 1987)
- Ghost Train: The Studio B Sessions (Sugar Hill Records, 2010)
