= Love's Gonna Happen to Me =

Single by Wynn Stewart and the Tourists

from the album Love's Gonna Happen to Me
- B-side: "Waltz of the Angels"
- Released: October 1967
- Recorded: August 3, 1967
- Studio: Capitol (Hollywood)
- Genre: Country; Bakersfield Sound
- Length: 2:16
- Label: Capitol
- Songwriter(s): Jim Stewart
- Producer(s): Ken Nelson

Wynn Stewart singles chronology
"'Cause I Have You" (1967)	"Love's Gonna Happen to Me" (1967)	"Something Pretty" (1968)

"Love's Gonna Happen to Me" is a song written by Jim Stewart and recorded by American country artist Wynn Stewart. It was released as a single in 1967 and became a major hit early the next year.

== Background and release ==
"Love's Gonna Happen to Me" was recorded on August 3, 1967 at the Capitol Recording Studio, located in Hollywood, California. The session was produced by Ken Nelson, Stewart's producer at Capitol Records. Two additional tracks were recorded in the same session. Stewart had recently signed with Capitol Records, after first being dropped by the label in the 1950s. He had first number one single on the label, "It's Such a Pretty World Today."

"Love's Gonna Happen to Me" was released as a single on Capitol Records in October 1967. It was his fifth single release with the label. A re-recording of his earlier hit, "Waltz of the Angels," is included as the single's B-side. His backing band, "The Tourists," were given equal billing on the single release by Capitol Records. The single spent 16 weeks on the Billboard Hot Country Singles chart before becoming a top ten hit, peaking at number seven in January 1968. "Love's Gonna Happen to Me" was Stewart's fourth top ten hit single in his career and his sixth major hit altogether. Over the next several years, Stewart would have further major hits for Capitol Records.

== Track listings ==
7" vinyl single

- "Love's Gonna Happen to Me" – 2:16
- "Waltz of the Angels" – 2:42

== Chart performance ==
Chart (1967–1968)	Peak position
US Hot Country Songs (Billboard)	7
