= World-Wide Travelin' Man =

Single by Wynn Stewart and the Tourists

from the album Let the Whole World Sing It with Me
- B-side: "Cry Baby"
- Released: June 1969
- Recorded: 1969
- Studio: Capitol (Hollywood)
- Genre: Country; Bakersfield Sound
- Length: 1:58
- Label: Capitol
- Songwriter(s): Vern Stovall
- Producer(s): Ken Nelson

Wynn Stewart singles chronology
"Let the Whole World Sing It with Me" (1969)	"World-Wide Travelin' Man" (1969)	"Yours Forever" (1969)

"World-Wide Travelin' Man" is a song written by Vern Stovall. It was recorded by American country artist Wynn Stewart. It was released as a single in 1969 and became a major hit that same year.

== Background and release ==
"World-Wide Travelin' Man" was recorded in 1969 at the Capitol Recording Studio, located in Hollywood, California. The session was produced by Ken Nelson, Stewart's producer at Capitol Records. The song was written by Vern Stovall. Stewart had been on the Capitol label for nearly five years at the time of this single release and had several major hits up to this point. This included the number one single "It's Such a Pretty World Today."

"World-Wide Travelin' Man" was released as a single on Capitol Records in June 1969. It was his twelfth single release with the label. His backing band, "The Tourists," were given equal billing on the single release by Capitol Records. The single spent 10 weeks on the Billboard Hot Country Singles chart before becoming a major hit, peaking at number 19 in September 1969. "In Love" was Stewart's eighth major hit as a music artist in his career on the Billboard charts.

== Track listings ==
7" vinyl single

- "World-Wide Travelin' Man" – 1:58
- "Cry Baby" – 2:17

== Chart performance ==
Chart (1969)	Peak position
US Hot Country Songs (Billboard)	19
