= Sing a Sad Song =

1963 single written by Wynn Stewart

Single by Merle Haggard

from the album Strangers
- B-side: "You Don't Even Try"
- Released: November 1963
- Recorded: 1963
- Studio: Capitol (Hollywood)
- Genre: Country; Bakersfield Sound
- Length: 2:35
- Label: Capitol
- Songwriter: Wynn Stewart
- Producers: Ken Nelson; Fuzzy Owen

Merle Haggard singles chronology
"Singin' My Heart Out" (1962)	"Sing a Sad Song" (1963)	"Sam Hill" (1964)

"Sing a Sad Song" is a song written by Wynn Stewart. It was recorded notably by Merle Haggard in 1963, whose version became his first major hit. It was later recorded by Stewart himself. In 1976, Stewart's own version became a major hit as well.

== Merle Haggard version ==
"Sing a Sad Song" was recorded by Merle Haggard in 1963 for Capitol Records. Haggard cut his version alongside producer Ken Nelson at Capitol Studios. Haggard had recently signed with the Capitol label, and later recorded his debut album in the same session as this single.

"Sing a Sad Song" was released as a single on Capitol Records in November 1963. It was Haggard's debut single release for the label and became successful. The single spent three weeks on the Billboard Hot Country Singles chart, peaking at number 19 in January 1964. The song became Haggard's first major hit as a music artist. It was released on his debut studio album called Strangers. Also included on the album was his first top ten hit,"(My Friends Are Gonna Be) Strangers."

=== Track listings ===
7" vinyl single

- "Sing a Sad Song" – 2:25
- "You Don't Even Try" – 2:15

=== Chart performance ===
Chart (1963–1964)	Peak position
US Hot Country Songs (Billboard)	19

== Wynn Stewart version ==
"Sing a Sad Song"

Single by Wynn Stewart

from the album After the Storm
- B-side: "It's Such a Pretty World Today"
- Released: October 1976
- Recorded: November 4, 1975
- Studio: RCA Victor Studio
- Genre: Country; Bakersfield Sound
- Length: 3:04
- Label: Playboy
- Songwriter: Wynn Stewart
- Producer: Eddie Kilroy

Wynn Stewart singles chronology
"After the Storm" (1976)	"Sing a Sad Song" (1976)	"Eyes as Big as Dallas" (1978)

"Sing a Sad Song" was notably recorded later by its writer, Wynn Stewart. He had first recorded a version that appeared on his 1965 debut studio album The Songs of Wynn Stewart. The album was issued on Capitol Records, but the song was not issued as a single. However, in 1975, Stewart signed a recording contract with Playboy Records where he re-cut the track along with several other former recordings. Stewart re-recorded the song on November 4, 1975, at the RCA Victor Studio, located in Nashville, Tennessee. The session was produced by Eddie Kilroy.

"Sing a Sad Song" was released as a single on Playboy Records in October 1976. It was Stewart's fourth single release with the label. The single spent 11 weeks on the Billboard Hot Country Singles chart, peaking at number 11 in January 1977. In Canada, the song became a top 40 hit single. It peaked at number 32 on the RPM Country Songs chart that same year. "Sing a Sad Song" was Stewart's final major hit of his career. He died in 1985.

=== Track listings ===
7" vinyl single

- "Sing a Sad Song" – 3:04
- "It's Such a Pretty World Today" – 2:33

=== Chart performance ===
Chart (1976–1977)	Peak position
Canada Country Songs (RPM)	32
US Hot Country Songs (Billboard)	19
