= Something Pretty (album) =

Studio album by Wynn Stewart and The Tourists
- Released: May 1968
- Recorded: January 1968
- Studio: Capitol (Hollywood)
- Genres: Country; Bakersfield Sound
- Label: Capitol
- Producer: Ken Nelson

Wynn Stewart and The Tourists chronology
Love's Gonna Happen to Me (1967)	Something Pretty (1968)	In Love (1968)

Singles from Something Pretty
- 1. "Something Pretty" Released: March 1968

Something Pretty is a studio album by American country artist Wynn Stewart and his band, The Tourists. It was released in May 1968 via Capitol Records and was produced by Ken Nelson. It was Stewart's fourth studio recording in his music career and contained a total of 12 tracks. Among these tracks was the title cut, which became a major hit on the country charts. The album received a positive response from music publications.

== Background and content ==
Something Pretty was recorded in January 1968 at the Capitol Recording Studio, located in Hollywood, California. The sessions were produced by Ken Nelson, who had produced Stewart's three previous Capitol releases during the decade. Stewart had been at Capitol for several years up to this point and was previously on the label in the 1950s. During his first stint at the label, he only had one major hit, "Waltz of the Angels." Following this, he was dropped from the roster. However, in 1964, he re-signed with the company under Nelson's production.

A total of 12 tracks were included on Something Pretty. Among these songs, five were written or co-written by Stewart. This included "Built-In Love," "If Tomorrow Could Be Yesterday" and "An Arm's Length from You." Songs written by other performers appeared on the album as well. Included were covers of Floyd Tillman's "This Cold War" and Tom T. Hall's "If Tomorrow Could Be Yesterday." In addition, the song "She Didn't Color Daddy" would also be recorded by singer Kay Adams.

== Release and reception ==
Professional ratings
Review scores
Source	Rating
Allmusic	3.5/5 stars
Billboard	Favorable

Something Pretty was released in May 1968 on Capitol Records. It was Stewart's fourth studio album release in his career and fourth issued on the Capitol label. Stewart's band The Tourists received equal billing on the album's release. It was issued as a vinyl LP, containing six songs on each side of the record. Something Pretty spent a total of six weeks on the Billboard Top Country Albums chart before peaking at number 28 in July 1968. It was Stewart's third album to chart on any Billboard survey. The album's title track was also a charting success. It was released as a single in March 1968. Spending 13 weeks charting, the title track peaked at number ten on the Billboard Hot Country Singles list in June 1968. It was Stewart's fourth top ten hit in his career. The title track also became his first charting single on the Canadian country charts, reaching number 20 the same year.

Something Pretty received a positive reception from music writers and their publications. Following its original release, the album was given a positive response in Billboard magazine in their June 1968 reviews. Writers praised the album's diverse musical styles, noting his band The Tourists in the review. "With Wynn Stewart's singles hit 'Something Pretty' leading the way, this album is destined for the same sales success won by Stewart's previous LP's," they wrote. In later years, Bruce Eder of Allmusic also gave the record a positive response, giving it 3.5 out of 5 stars. Eder noticed the stylistic change in Stewart's sound towards a pop-friendly direction yet praised its production. "The playing is impeccable throughout, and the arrangements and singing are beautiful in both their restraint and execution," he concluded.

== Track listing ==
Side one
No.	Title	Writer(s)	Length
1.	"Something Pretty"	Buddy Wayne; Charlie Williams	2:30
2.	"Built-In Love"	Wynn Stewart	2:30
3.	"She Didn't Color Daddy"	Scotty Turner; Roy Warren	2:33
4.	"One More Memory"	Bobby George; Vern Stovall	2:33
5.	"If Tomorrow Could Be Yesterday"	Wynn Stewart	2:14
6.	"Good Old Fashioned Love"	Tom T. Hall	2:48

Side two
No.	Title	Writer(s)	Length
1.	"It's Too Much Like Lonesome"	Tommy Collins	2:55
2.	"An Arm's Length from You"	Jim Stewart; W. Stewart	2:35
3.	"Your Steppin' Stone"	Bozo Darnell; Major Luper	2:19
4.	"This Cold War"	Floyd Tillman	3:00
5.	"Why Didn't I Write That Song?"	W. Stewart	2:34
6.	"Man, Man Mr. Sandman"	Hal Bynum; W. Stewart	1:56

== Personnel ==
All credits are adapted from the liner notes of Something Pretty.

Musical personnel

- Tommy Collins – guitar
- Bobby George – guitar
- Ralph Mooney – steel guitar
- Bob Morris – bass
- Roy Nichols – guitar
- Bob Pierce – piano
- Helen Price – drums
- Wynn Stewart – lead vocals
- Clarence White – guitar

Technical personnel

- Roy Kohara – cover photo
- Ken Nelson – producer

== Chart performance ==
Chart (1968)	Peak position
US Top Country Albums (Billboard)	28

== Release history ==
Region	Date	Format	Label	Ref.
Canada	May 1968	Vinyl	Capitol Records	
United States	May 1968	Vinyl	Capitol Records	
