= In Love =

In Love may refer to:

- In love, feeling of romantic love

== Albums ==
- In Love (Bunny DeBarge album), 1987
- In Love (Cheryl Lynn album) or the title song, 1979
- In Love (Juli album), 2010
- In Love (Peace album), 2013
- In Love (Wynn Stewart album) or the title song (see below), 1968
- In Love (EP), by Kara, 2015

== Songs ==
- "In Love" (Ronnie Milsap song), 1986
- "In Love" (Wynn Stewart song), 1968
- "In Love", by Brotherhood of Man from B for Brotherhood, 1978
- "In Love", by the Datsuns from The Datsuns, 2002
- "In Love", by Kid Cudi from Entergalactic, 2022
- "In Love", by Lisa Maffia from First Lady, 2003
- "In Love", by Prince from For You, 1978
- "Ishq Mein" (lit. 'In Love'), by Sachin–Jigar, Sachet Tandon, Asees Kaur, Shruti Dhasmana, Sarah Moidutty and Sahil Vishwakarma from the 2025 Indian film Nadaaniyan
- "In Love", by Scouts of St. Sebastian, a bonus song from Guitar Hero III, 2007

== See also ==
- Falling in love (disambiguation)
