= In Love (Wynn Stewart album) =

Studio album by Wynn Stewart and The Tourists
- Released: November 1968
- Recorded: 1967–1968
- Studio: Capitol (Hollywood)
- Genres: Country; Bakersfield Sound
- Label: Capitol
- Producer: Ken Nelson

Wynn Stewart chronology
Something Pretty (1968)	In Love (1968)	Let the Whole World Sing It with Me (1969)

Singles from In Love
- 1. "In Love" Released: July 1968

In Love is a studio album by American country artist Wynn Stewart and his backing band, The Tourists. It was released in November 1968 via Capitol Records and was produced by Ken Nelson. In Love was Stewart's fifth studio release in his recording career and consisted of 11 tracks. The album's title track became a major hit during the same time in both the United States and Canada.

== Background and content ==
In Love was recorded in several sessions between 1967 and 1968. These sessions were held at the Capitol Recording Studio, located in Hollywood, California. The record was produced by Ken Nelson, who was Stewart's long time producer at the Capitol record company. A total of 11 tracks are included on the album. Six of the album's tracks were composed by Dale Noe. Noe had previously composed other material for Stewart, including his 1967 number one hit "It's Such a Pretty World Today." Unlike his previous releases, the album only included one self-written track by Stewart himself. In previous album releases, several Stewart-composed songs were included. Stewart had co-written the song "A Thousand Wonders" for this record. The collection also included a cover version of the 1942 patriotic tune "There's a Star-Spangled Banner Waving Somewhere."

== Release and chart performance ==
In Love was released in November 1968 on Capitol Records. It was Stewart's fifth album release in his career and the fifth release for Capitol. His backing band, The Tourists, received equal billing on the album. The record was issued as a vinyl LP, containing six songs on side one and five songs on side two. Unlike his previous three studio albums, In Love did not reach any positions on the Billboard chart publications. This included the Top Country Albums list. However, its corresponding single was successful. The album's title track was issued as its only single. The song was released to radio in July 1968 via Capitol Records. After 11 weeks, the title track became a major hit, peaking at number 16 on the Billboard Hot Country Singles chart in October 1968. The track also became his second charting single on the Canadian RPM Country Songs chart, reaching number 20 in 1968.

== Track listing ==
Side one
No.	Title	Writer(s)	Length
1.	"In Love"	Bobby George	2:10
2.	"Missing You"	Dale Noe; Red Sovine	3:01
3.	"Kiss-a Me, Love-a Me"	Noe	2:26
4.	"Don't Lay Your Head on My Shoulder"	Noe	2:20
5.	"Happy Blues"	Noe	2:21
6.	"A Tough Row to Hoe"	George	2:00

Side two
No.	Title	Writer(s)	Length
1.	"A Thousand Wonders"	Noe; Wynn Stewart	2:42
2.	"There's a Star-Spangled Banner Waving Somewhere"	Shelby Darnell; Paul Roberts	2:04
3.	"My Own Little World"	Bob Morris	2:35
4.	"Louisiana Blues Harp Man"	Carl Walden	2:13
5.	"I'll Die Tryin"	Noe	2:35

== Personnel ==
All credits are adapted from the liner notes of In Love.

Musical personnel

- David Allen – drums
- Jimmie Collins – steel guitar
- Tommy Collins – guitar
- Bobby George – guitar
- Dennis Hromek – bass
- Ralph Mooney – steel guitar
- Bob Morris – bass
- Dale Noe – guitar
- Bob Pierce – piano
- Helen Price – drums
- Bobby Wayne – guitar
- Wynn Stewart – lead vocals
- Carl Walden – harmonica
- Clarence White – guitar

Technical personnel

- Ken Nelson – producer

== Release history ==
Region	Date	Format	Label	Ref.
Canada	November 1968	Vinyl	Capitol Records	
United States	November 1968	Vinyl	Capitol Records	
