= Love's Gonna Happen to Me (album) =

Studio album by Wynn Stewart and the Tourists
- Released: November 1967
- Recorded: 1967
- Studio: Capitol (Hollywood)
- Genre: Country; Bakersfield Sound
- Label: Capitol
- Producer: Ken Nelson

Wynn Stewart chronology
It's Such a Pretty World Today (1967)	Love's Gonna Happen to Me (1967)	Something Pretty (1968)

Love's Gonna Happen to Me is a studio album by American country artist Wynn Stewart. His backing band, "The Tourists", received equal billing on the album release. It was released in November 1967 via Capitol Records and was produced by Ken Nelson. It was Stewart's third studio album in his career and was the second album release of 1967. The album's title track became a major hit in 1967 during the same period of the record's release.

== Background and content ==
Love's Gonna Happen to Me was recorded in 1967 at the Capitol Recording Studio, located in Hollywood, California. The album's recording sessions were produced by Ken Nelson. Nelson was Stewart's longtime producer with Capitol through the end of the decade. He had also worked with Stewart in the 1950s when he was first signed with the label (but was later dropped and then resigned years later). Love's Gonna Happen to Me contained a total of 12 tracks. Seven of these tracks were written by Stewart himself. Songs such as "That's the Only Way to Cry," "Daddy's Girl" and "Make Big Love" were all self-composed. The track, "Down Came the World" was co-written by Waylon Jennings. Also included was a remake of "Above and Beyond (The Call of Love)," which he first recorded several years prior. Stewart's re-recording of his first Capitol hit, "Waltz of the Angels," is also featured in the album's track listing.

== Release and reception ==
Professional ratings
Review scores
Source	Rating
Billboard	Favorable

Love's Gonna Happen to Me was released in November 1967 on Capitol Records. It was Stewart's third studio album and second album release of the year. His backing band, The Tourists, received equal billing on the album. The album was issued as a Vinyl LP, containing six songs on each side of the record. Love's Gonna Happen to Me spent 11 weeks on the Billboard Top Country Albums chart and peaked at number 13 in March 1968. It was Stewart's second album to chart any Billboard survey. Although not a proper album review, Billboard magazine did give the album's sound reception in a 1967 article. In the article, writers commented that the style of Love's Gonna Happen to Me was "individualistic" compared to other performers. The album's title track was the only single release. It was issued as a single in October 1967. The song became a top ten hit in early 1968, reaching number seven on the Billboard Hot Country Singles chart in January 1968. The song was Stewart's fourth top ten hit in his music career.

== Track listing ==
Side one
No.	Title	Writer(s)	Length
1.	"Love's Gonna Happen to Me"	Jim Stewart	2:16
2.	"Waltz of the Angels"	Dick Reynolds; Jack Rhodes	2:44
3.	"Above and Beyond"	Harlan Howard	2:03
4.	"That's the Only Way to Cry"	Cliff Massey; Wynn Stewart	2:24
5.	"Daddy's Girl"	W. Stewart	2:17
6.	"Loversville"	W. Stewart	2:17

Side two
No.	Title	Writer(s)	Length
1.	"Down Came the World"	Bozo Darnell; Waylon Jennings	2:26
2.	"It's So Cold in Your House and Lonesome in Mind"	Massey; W. Stewart	2:47
3.	"Sing That Same Song"	W. Stewart	2:31
4.	"Make Big Love"	W. Stewart	2:00
5.	"I Won't Live That Long"	Tommy Collins; W. Stewart	2:34
6.	"The World's Youngest Naughty Old Man"	Joe Poovey	2:26

== Personnel ==
All credits are adapted from the liner notes of Love's Gonna Happen to Me.

Musical personnel

- David Allen – drums
- Phil Baugh – guitar
- Jimmie Collins – steel guitar
- Tommy Collins – guitar
- George French – piano
- Harold Garrison – guitar
- Dennis Hromek – bass
- Roy Nichols – guitar
- Bob Pierce – piano
- Wynn Stewart – lead vocals
- Bobby Wayne – guitar

Technical personnel

- Dick Brown – cover photo
- Ken Nelson – producer

== Chart performance ==
Chart (1967–1968)	Peak position
US Top Country Albums (Billboard)	13

== Release history ==
Region	Date	Format	Label	Ref.
Canada	November 1967	Vinyl	Capitol Records	
United States	November 1967	Vinyl	Capitol Records	
