= Let the Whole World Sing It with Me =

Single by Wynn Stewart and the Tourists

from the album Let the Whole World Sing It with Me
- B-side: "Who Are You"
- Released: March 1969
- Recorded: 1969
- Studio: Capitol Recording Studio
- Genre: Country; Bakersfield Sound
- Length: 2:45
- Label: Capitol
- Songwriter(s): Dale Noe
- Producer(s): Ken Nelson

Wynn Stewart singles chronology
"Strings" (1968)	"Let the Whole World Sing It with Me" (1969)	"World-Wide Travelin' Man" (1969)

"Let the Whole World Sing It with Me" is a song written by Dale Noe. It was recorded by American country artist Wynn Stewart. It was released as a single in 1969 and became a major hit that same year.

== Background and release ==
"Let the Whole World Sing It with Me" was recorded in 1969 at the Capitol Recording Studio, located in Hollywood, California. The session was produced by Ken Nelson, Stewart's producer at Capitol Records. The song was written by Dale Noe, who wrote several other singles for Stewart including his number one hit from 1967. Stewart had been on the Capitol label for nearly four years at the time of this single release and had several major hits up to this point. This included the number one single "It's Such a Pretty World Today."

"Let the Whole World Sing It with Me" was released as a single on Capitol Records in March 1969. It was his eleventh single release with the label. His backing band, "The Tourists," were given equal billing on the single release by Capitol Records. The single spent 12 weeks on the Billboard Hot Country Singles chart before becoming a major hit, peaking at number 20 in June 1969. "In Love" was Stewart's eighth major hit as a music artist in his career on the Billboard charts.

== Track listings ==
7" vinyl single

- "Let the Whole World Sing It with Me" – 2:45
- "Who Are You" – 2:45

== Chart performance ==
Chart (1969)	Peak position
US Hot Country Songs (Billboard)	20
