= Tequila (The Champs song) =

1958 single by the Champs

Single by the Champs

from the album Go, Champs, Go!
- Language: Spanish/English
- A-side: "Train to Nowhere"
- Released: January 15, 1958
- Recorded: December 23, 1957
- Studio: Gold Star, Hollywood, California
- Genre: Latin rock; instrumental rock; surf
- Label: Challenge
- Songwriter: Chuck Rio
- Producer: Joe Johnson (Challenge Records)

The Champs singles chronology
"Tequila" (1958)	"Chariot Rock" (1958)

"Tequila" is a 1958 Latin-inspired instrumental song written by "Chuck Rio" (Danny Flores) and recorded by American rock and roll band The Champs. It became a No. 1 hit on both the pop and R&B charts at the time of its release and continues to be strongly referenced in pop culture to this day.

In 1958, "Tequila" won a Grammy for Best Rhythm & Blues Performance at the 1st Annual Grammy Awards. In 2001, it was inducted into the Grammy Hall of Fame.

== History ==
In 1957, Gene Autry's record label, Challenge Records, signed Dave Burgess (1934-2025), a rockabilly singer-songwriter from California. Burgess organized a recording session on December 23 in Hollywood. In the studio that day were Burgess on rhythm guitar, Chuck Hills on bass, the Flores Trio (Danny Flores saxophone and piano, Gene Alden on drums, and lead guitarist Buddy Bruce), and Huelyn Duvall contributing backing vocals. They gathered primarily to record "Train to Nowhere", a song by Burgess, as well as "Night Beat" and "All Night Rock" (a song that has never been released).

The last tune recorded was "Tequila", essentially just a jam by the Flores Trio. It is based on a Cuban mambo song "Como Mi Ritmo No Hay Dos" by Cachao. The word "tequila" is spoken three times throughout the tune. There were three takes, and Danny Flores, who wrote the song, was also the man who spoke the word "Tequila!" solo. The song served as the B-side for "Train to Nowhere", which was released by Challenge Records on January 29, 1958. "Tequila" reached No. 1 on the Billboard pop chart on March 24, 1958. The song reached No. 1 in Canada, on March 24, 1958.

Daniel Flores had written "Tequila", but, because he was signed to another label, the tune was credited to "Chuck Rio", a name he adopted for the stage. Those present for the December 23 session began recording together again on January 20, 1958, under the name the Champs; the group technically formed after recording "Tequila". The tune has been noted to have a similar rhythm structure to Bo Diddley's 1958 release "Dearest Darling" from his self-titled compilation album.

The Champs recorded a sequel to "Tequila" titled "Too Much Tequila". Released as a maroon-label Challenge single, it reached No. 30 on the Billboard Hot 100. In 2020, group leader Dave Burgess resurrected The Champs and recorded 12 new tracks for an LP titled Tequila Party. The album contains a "party" version of "Tequila".

== Covers and references in popular culture ==
- Eddie Platt took the tune to No. 20 in the U.S. in 1958.
- Sheb Wooley's "The Purple People Eater" ends with a high-pitched alien voice shouting "Tequila."
- A version recorded by Yugoslav rock band Iskre appeared as the title track on their second EP, released in 1965.
- Hot Butter, known for their 1972 single "Popcorn", released "Tequila" as a single the same year.(#61 CAN AC)
- English ska band Bad Manners covered the song on their 1980 album Loonee Tunes!
- Jazz guitarist Larry Carlton recorded a version of the tune, with scat vocals by Al Jarreau, on his 1983 album Friends.
- A Latin hip hop cover in 1992 by A.L.T. & the Lost Civilization became a top-ten hit in Australia and New Zealand and reached number 48 in the United States.
- David Sanborn covered the tune from his 2003 album Time Again.
- "Tequila" is the University of Washington Husky Marching Band "dynasty" song, with Washington Huskies fans sporting "Tequila!" bumper stickers and T-shirts. The band plays the song at every home and away football game.
- The 1985 film Pee-wee's Big Adventure featured a scene in which Pee-wee Herman (Paul Reubens) is at a bar and knocks over a row of parked motorcycles angering the bikers, but then proceeds to win them over by selecting "Tequila" from the jukebox and comically dancing to it while wearing platform shoes. The "Pee-wee dance," as well as the character himself, have since been closely linked with the tune in popular culture.
- Professional wrestler Danhausen is also known to do the "Pee-wee dance" to the tune of Tequila in the middle of matches.
- The song was featured in the famous carnival scene from the 1993 film, The Sandlot, where the main characters get sick from Big Chief chewing tobacco
- A recomposition of the song was used as the theme song for Banana Split from 2009 until 2011.
- In 2011, Ben Makinen published lyrics to the song.
- The song was adopted by supporters of Brighton & Hove Albion F.C. in 2019 in honour of their midfielder Yves Bissouma, replacing the word "Tequila" in the song with "Bissouma". Arsenal did the same beginning in 2025 with their defender William Saliba. Celtic fans did the same beginning in 2025 with their striker Daizen Maeda.
- The jazz vocal group The Manhattan Transfer recorded a radically reworked and expanded version of the song, titled "Tequila/The Way of the Booze," on their 2018 album The Junction.

== See also ==
- List of number-one singles of 1958 (U.S.)
- List of number-one R&B singles of 1958 (U.S.)
