= Big Big Love =

Big Big Love may refer to:

- "Big Big Love" (Belinda Carlisle song), 2023
- "Big Love" (Fleetwood Mac song), 1987
- BigBigLove, a 2004 album by Little Birdy
- "Big, Big Love", a 1961 song by Wynn Stewart, covered by k.d. lang and the Reclines in 1989
- "Big Big Love (Fig. 2)", a song by Foals from the 2008 album Antidotes
