= Something Pretty =

Single by Wynn Stewart and the Tourists

from the album Something Pretty
- B-side: "Built In Love"
- Released: March 1968
- Recorded: January 3, 1968
- Studio: Capitol Recording Studio
- Genre: Country; Bakersfield Sound
- Length: 2:30
- Label: Capitol
- Songwriters: Buddy Wayne; Charlie Williams
- Producer: Ken Nelson

Wynn Stewart singles chronology
"Love's Gonna Happen to Me" (1967)	"Something Pretty" (1968)	"In Love" (1968)

"Something Pretty" is a song written by Buddy Wayne and Charlie Williams. It was recorded by American country artist Wynn Stewart. It was released as a single in 1968 and became a major hit that same year.

== Background and release ==
"Something Pretty" was recorded on January 3, 1968, at the Capitol Recording Studio, located in Hollywood, California. The session was produced by Ken Nelson, Stewart's producer at Capitol Records. Three additional tracks were recorded in the same session. Stewart had recently signed with Capitol Records, after first being dropped by the label in the 1950s. He had first number one single on the label, "It's Such a Pretty World Today."

"Something Pretty" was released as a single on Capitol Records in March 1968. It was his fifth single release with the label. His backing band, "The Tourists," were given equal billing on the single release by Capitol Records. The single spent 13 weeks on the Billboard Hot Country Singles chart before becoming a top ten hit, peaking at number seven in January 1968. "Something Pretty" was Stewart's fifth top ten hit single in his career and his seventh major hit altogether. Over the next several years, Stewart would have further major hits for Capitol Records. In Canada, the song became his first charting song and first major hit. It peaked at number 20 on the RPM Country Songs chart that same year.

== Track listings ==
7" vinyl single

- "Something Pretty" – 2:30
- "Built In Love" – 2:30

== Chart performance ==
Chart (1968)	Peak position
Canada Country Songs (RPM)	20
US Hot Country Songs (Billboard)	10
