= I Need You Baby =

I Need You Baby may refer to:

- "I Need You Baby", Rolling Stones cover of "Mona (I Need You Baby)", song by Bo Diddley 1967
- "I Need You Baby", song written for the Orioles by Deborah Chessler 1954
- "I Need You Baby", song by George W. Weston 1958
- "I Need You Baby", song by The Nashville Teens 1964, McDaniels
- "I Need You Baby", single by Jesse James, written by Audrey Calvin 1971
- "I Need You Baby", B-side of "Shake Your Money Maker' by Elmore James
- "I Need You Baby", song by Arthur Alexander 1968
- "I Need You Baby", song by Ray Conniff 1975
- "I Need You Baby", song by Chuck Berry from Rockit 1979
- "I Need You Baby", song by Little Milton 1983
