= Danny Flores =

American musician (1929–2006)

- Also known as: Chuck Rio
- Born: Daniel Flores; July 11, 1929; Santa Paula, California, U.S
- Origin: Huntington Beach, California
- Died: September 19, 2006 (aged 77) Huntington Beach, California
- Genres: Rock and roll, Latin rock
- Occupations: Musician, songwriter
- Instruments: Saxophone, Piano
- Years active: 1957–2006
- Labels: Challenge Records, Jackpot

Daniel Flores (July 11, 1929 – September 19, 2006), also known by his stage name Chuck Rio, was an American rock and roll saxophonist. He is best remembered for his self-penned song "Tequila", which he recorded with The Champs, the band of which he was a member at the time, and which reached number one on the Billboard Hot 100.

== Biography ==
Of Mexican heritage, Flores was born in Santa Paula, California, and grew up in Long Beach. He was interested in the guitar from an early age, first performing at church and family gatherings. At 14, however, Flores switched to the saxophone, forming his first band, the 3-D Ranch Boys. Emulating the rasping sounds of tenor saxophonist Vido Musso, Flores played a variety of music genres - jazz, country, pop, and blues - to cater to his hard-going blue-collar clientele. Much to Flores's amusement, he has remarked, during this early stage of his career, he was commonly called the "Mexican Hillbilly". In the early 1950s, Flores recorded vocals for small Pasadena-based record labels, before signing to Modern Records/RPM Records, and releasing his earliest rock and roll material.

In 1957, Flores met aspiring songwriter and guitarist Dave Burgess. After briefly performing as Danny and Dave, the duo recruited former members of Flores's group, drummer Gene Alden and guitarist Buddy Bruce, along with bassist Cliff Hills to form the Champs. Huelyn Duvall contributed vocals to these tracks. On December 23, 1957, the group recorded three songs for Challenge Records, including Flores' instrumental Tequila. The song is highlighted by Flores's "dirty sax" arrangements and his interjecting "Tequila!" following the turnaround between variations of the saxophone melody. Because Flores' speaking the song's only word made him the song's primary vocalist for crediting and record-keeping purposes, he was credited under the name "Chuck Rio" to avoid conflicts with his other record label, where he was signed as a vocalist. "Tequila" was released as the B-side to the Champs' debut single, but after listeners requested the song over its A-side "Train to Nowhere", "Tequila" propelled to number one on the Billboard Hot 100 in January 1958.

Conflicts between Flores and Burgess over leadership and the band's musical direction led to Flores' departure. He signed his rights away to "Tequila" and ultimately did not receive any royalties from the tune despite its success. In the intervening years, he formed other groups called the Originals and the Persuaders, the latter recording for Saturn Records in 1963. Flores continued to perform across California for the rest of his life. It was not until the early 2000s that he finally received royalties for "Tequila", albeit only for sales in Europe.

Flores died on September 19, 2006, of pneumonia. He had also been suffering from Parkinson's disease for some years.
