= Did I Ever Tell You =

Single by George Jones, Margie Singleton

from the album Duets, Country Style
- B-side: "Not Even Friends"
- Released: August 28, 1961
- Recorded: 1961
- Genre: Country
- Length: 2:06
- Label: Mercury
- Songwriter(s): Jerry Kennedy, Margie Singleton
- Producer(s): Shelby Singleton

George Jones singles chronology
"Tender Years" (1961)	"Did I Ever Tell You" (1961)	"Waltz of the Angels" (1961)

"Did I Ever Tell You" is a duet by American country singers George Jones and Margie Singleton on their 1962 duet album, Duets Country Style. It was released as a single in 1961, peaking at number 15 on the 1961 Billboard Hot Country Songs singles chart.

== Background ==
Like Jones, Singleton began her career at Starday Records and released her first single in 1957, "One Step (Nearer to You)". Singleton released another single in 1959 called "Eyes Of Love". The song gave Singleton her first major hit when it reached the top 20 in 1960. In 1961, she switched to Mercury Records where her husband Shelby Singleton was a producer. With his help, Singleton recorded a duet with George Jones called "Did I Ever Tell You." The song a hit for Singleton, peaking at No. 15 in 1961. The following year, the duo had equal success together with another country hit called "Waltz of the Angels". Jones, who had previously recorded duets with Jeanette Hicks and Virginia Spurlock, would record more famous duets with Melba Montgomery and future wife Tammy Wynette in the years ahead.
