= Big, Big Love =

Single by Wynn Stewart
- B-side: "One More Memory"
- Released: September 1961
- Recorded: August 28, 1961
- Studio: Capitol (Hollywood)
- Genre: Country; Bakersfield Sound
- Length: 2:23
- Label: Challenge Records
- Songwriter(s): Wynn Stewart
- Producer(s): Joe Johnson

Wynn Stewart singles chronology
"I'd Rather Have America" (1960)	"Big, Big Love" (1961)	"I Don't Feel at Home" (1962)

"Big, Big Love" is a song written and recorded by American country artist Wynn Stewart. It was released as a single in 1961 and became a major hit the same year.

== Background and release ==
"Big, Big Love" was recorded on August 28, 1961 at the Capitol Recording Studio, located in Hollywood, California. The session was produced by Joe Johnson, Stewart's producer at Challenge Records. Three additional tracks were recorded during the same session, including the single's B-side "One More Memory." Stewart had recently signed with Challenge Records after several years at Capitol Records. At Challenge, he adapted a new musical style that incorporated the Bakersfield Sound. The song was Stewart's second self-written tune to be released as a single.

""Big, Big Love"" was released as a single on Challenge Records in September 1961. It was his eighth single release with the label. It spent a total of seven weeks on the Billboard Country and Western Sides chart before becoming a major hit, reaching number 18 in December 1961. "Big, Big Love" was Stewart's third major hit in his recording career and second with the Challenge label. He would achieve his biggest success recording for the Capitol label in later years.

== Cover Versions ==
- Waylon Jennings on his 1973 album Lonesome, On'ry and Mean.
- k.d. lang on her 1989 album Absolute Torch and Twang.
- Nick Lowe on his 1988 album Pinker and Prouder Than Previous.
- Tanya Tucker on her 2009 album My Turn

== Track listings ==
7" vinyl single

- "Big, Big Love" – 2:23
- "One More Memory" – 2:10

== Chart performance ==
Chart (1961)	Peak position
US Hot Country Songs (Billboard)	18
