= Another Day, Another Dollar =

Single by Wynn Stewart
- B-side: "Donna on My Mind"
- Released: August 1962
- Recorded: February 8, 1962
- Studio: Capitol (Hollywood)
- Genre: Country; Bakersfield Sound
- Length: 2:25
- Label: Challenge Records
- Songwriter(s): Wynn Stewart
- Producer(s): Joe Johnson

Wynn Stewart singles chronology
"Loversville" (1962)	"Another Day, Another Dollar" (1962)	"I'm Not the Man I Used to Be" (1963)

"Another Day, Another Dollar" is a song written and recorded by American country artist Wynn Stewart. It was released as a single in 1962 and became a top 40 single that year.

== Background and release ==
The phrase "Another Day, Another Dollar" itself comes from the building of the Panama Canal where workers were rumored to receive a single dollar a day as compensation for their labor. The song was recorded on February 8, 1962 at the Capitol Recording Studio, located in Hollywood, California. The session was produced by Joe Johnson, Stewart's producer at Challenge Records. Four additional tracks were recorded during the same session. The song was recorded in the Bakersfield Sound style of country. This sound had been created and adapted by west coast country artists and session musicians.

"Another Day, Another Dollar" was released as a single on Challenge Records in August 1962. The song spent a total of three weeks on the Billboard Country and Western Sides chart before reaching number 27 in December 1962. "Another Day, Another Dollar" was Stewart's fourth charting single in his recording career. It was also his final charting single with the Challenge label before switching labels.

The song regained popularity in 2011 when it was used in the commercial for the new Volkswagen Jetta.

== Track listings ==
7" vinyl single

- "Another Day, Another Dollar" – 2:25
- "Donna on My Mind" – 2:30

== Personnel ==
- Wynn Stewart - vocals, guitar
- Roy E. Nichols - guitar
- Ralph Eugene Mooney - steel quitar
- Robert Allen 'Bobby' Austin - bass
- Helen ‘Peaches’ Price - drums
- Robert Jim Pierce - piano

== Chart performance ==
Chart (1962)	Peak position
US Hot Country Songs (Billboard)	27
