= 'Cause I Have You =

Single by Wynn Stewart
- B-side: "That's the Only Way to Cry"
- Released: July 1967
- Recorded: February 9, 1965
- Studio: Capitol (Hollywood)
- Genre: Country; Bakersfield Sound
- Length: 2:32
- Label: Capitol 5937
- Songwriter(s): Wynn Stewart, Don Sessions
- Producer(s): Ken Nelson

Wynn Stewart singles chronology
"It's Such a Pretty World Today" (1967)	"'Cause I Have You" (1967)	"Love's Gonna Happen to Me" (1967)

"'Cause I Have You" is a song co-written and recorded by American country artist Wynn Stewart. It was released as a single in 1967 and became a major hit the same year. Stewart wrote the song with Don Sessions.

== Background and release ==
"'Cause I Have You" was recorded on February 9, 1965 at the Capitol Recording Studio, located in Hollywood, California. The session was produced by Ken Nelson, Stewart's producer at Capitol Records. Four additional tracks were recorded during the same session, including the single "Sha-Marie." Stewart had recently signed with Capitol Records, after first being dropped by the label in the 1950s. He had first number one single on the label, "It's Such a Pretty World Today."

"'Cause I Have You" was released as a single on Capitol Records in June 1967. It was his fourth single release with the label. The single spent 16 weeks on the Billboard Hot Country Singles chart before becoming a top ten hit, peaking at number nine in September. "'Cause I Have You" was Stewart's third top ten hit single in his career and his fifth major hit altogether. Over the next several years, Stewart would have further major hits for Capitol Records.

== Track listing ==
7" vinyl single

- "'Cause I Have You" – 2:32
- "That's the Only Way to Cry" – 2:24 - Written by Cliff Massey

== Chart performance ==
Chart (1967)	Peak position
US Hot Country Songs (Billboard)	9
