= Bud Hobbs =

American country singer (1919–1958)

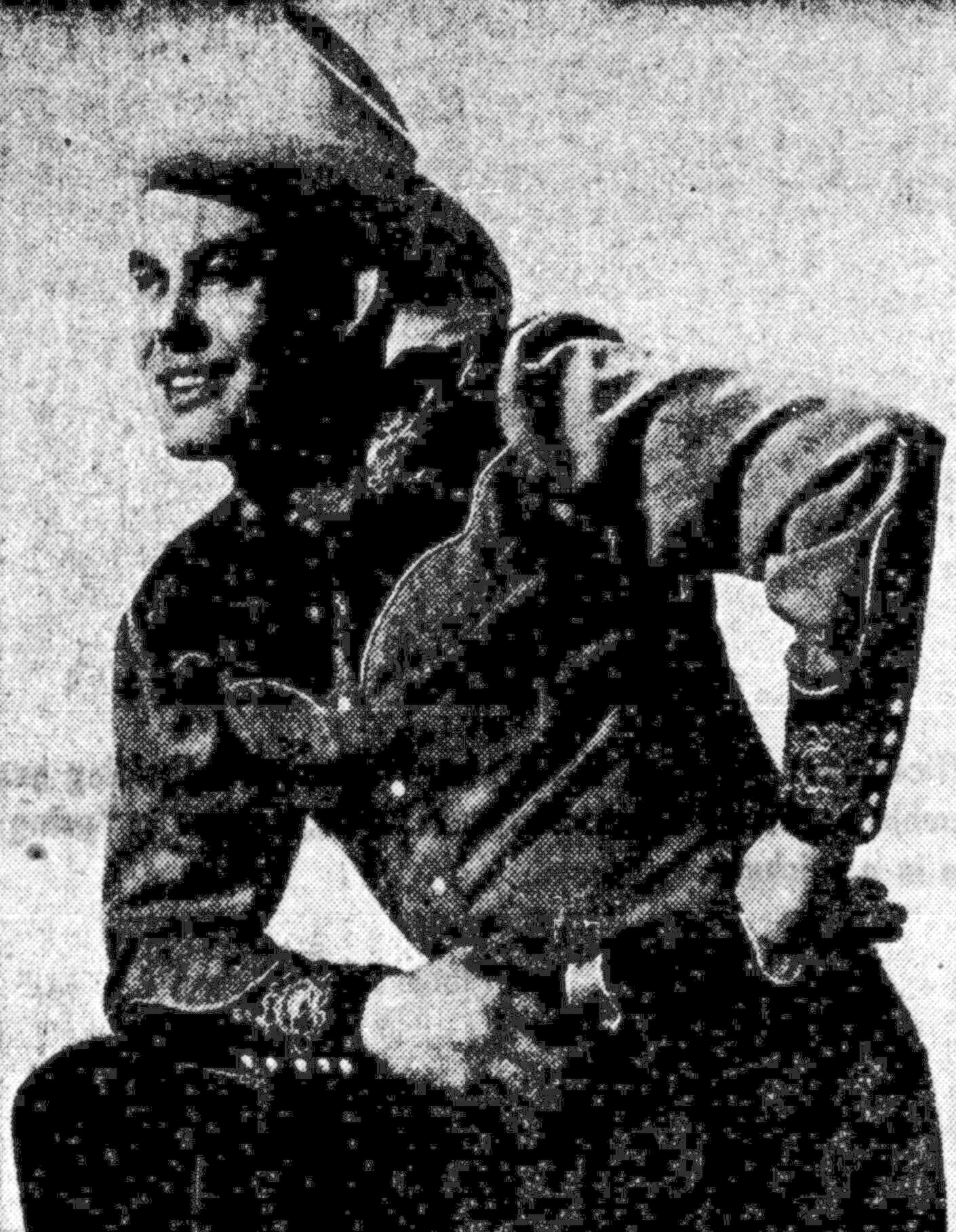
- Hobbs c. 1953
- Born: Henry Roland Hobbs; October 16, 1919; Taft, California, U.S.
- Died: July 18, 1958 (aged 38); Bakersfield, California, U.S.
- Occupations: Singer; Guitarist; Disc jockey; Television host
- Musical career
- Genres: Country; Honky-tonk; Western swing; Bakersfield sound
- Years active: 1940s–1950s
- Label: MGM

Bud Hobbs (October 16, 1919–July 18, 1958) was an American country singer and songwriter who is often cited as an early pioneer of the Bakersfield sound. Known for straddling the stylistic divide between Western swing and honky-tonk, Hobbs possessed a distinctive country-crooner vocal style.

During a career cut short by his death at the age of 38, Hobbs recorded roughly 30 studio sides, three of which reached the Billboard country charts. Four of his releases featured guitarist Buck Owens in an early studio role.

== Performer ==
Hobbs began his musical career in the early 1940s. By 1942 he was described in local press as a "well-known cowboy performer" in the Palm Springs area. Another report that year in the Palm Springs Limelight-News praised his playing and stage presence in dialectal style, noting that "ole Bud Hobbs bang-up good musick" drew dancers to the floor.

From about 1945 to 1948 Hobbs performed with Dude Martin and His Round-Up Gang in San Francisco, before returning to solo work. In 1948 he formed his own dance band, the Trail Herders, which appeared at auditoriums, rodeos, fairs, and barn dances across California, Arizona, New Mexico, Texas, Oklahoma, Oregon, Washington, and other states.

In his native Bakersfield he played regularly at venues such as the Rainbow Gardens, hosted by bandleader Bill Woods of the Blackboard Club. During this period Hobbs also shared stages with leading country acts including Roy Acuff, Tex Williams, Lefty Frizzell, T. Texas Tyler, Ernest Tubb, and Jimmy Wakely.

== Recording artist ==
Between 1947 and 1956 Hobbs recorded approximately 30 titles for MGM Records, issued on both 7-inch and 10-inch 78 rpm discs. His sessions were noted for their high production standards and featured leading Los Angeles studio musicians of the period.

His debut recording session took place at Radio Recorders in Hollywood on December 10, 1947, producing the Sheb Wooley–penned "Lazy Mazy" (MGM 10206), which became his first charting single, reaching number 13 on the Billboard country chart. A follow-up Wooley composition, "I Heard About You" (MGM 10305), peaked at number 12 in January 1949, as did his cover of George Morgan's "Candy Kisses" (MGM 10366), issued in May of that year.

Among Hobbs's later recordings, "Louisiana Swing" (MGM 11964, 1954) has been cited as one of the first discs to embody the style later identified as the Bakersfield sound. Written by Sheb Wooley and cut at Radio Recorders, the track featured Buck Owens on guitar with Jelly Sanders and Oscar Whittington on twin fiddles. Its B-side, the ballad "I'm Gonna Set You Free," was co-written by Hobbs with Dusty Rhodes.

Other standout MGM titles included "Enough Is Enough," "Brimstone Beauty," and "Try Being True." Hobbs concluded his recording career in 1956 with "Last Dance Tonight" (MGM 12285), written by Bill Woods and Bob Wesley.

== Collaboration with Buck Owens ==
Buck Owens, later recognized as the most prominent exponent of the Bakersfield sound, played guitar on at least four of Hobbs's MGM recordings, including "Louisiana Swing," "You're Just What the Doctor Ordered," "Goose Rock," and "Mean, Mean, Mean."

In his autobiography Buck 'Em! Owens recalled these early sessions in Hollywood, describing them as a turning point in his own career:

Since I'd moved to Bakersfield, I'd gone from living in my car to...[moving] back in with my parents until I could find a place of my own. But as far as playing music was concerned, things were moving in the right direction. There was a singer named Bud Hobbs who'd made a bunch of records for the MGM label...I was just excited about getting to be the guitar player on a recording session in Hollywood for the first time...Looking back on it now, that was quite a lineup of musicians...[A]ll of these Bakersfield guys were starting to kind of infiltrate the country records that were being made in Los Angeles...

== Disk jockey and television host ==
Hobbs pursued a parallel career as a radio personality that spanned more than two decades. He began broadcasting at age 17 on KVEC in San Luis Obispo, and by 1946 was hosting his own program on KYA in San Francisco. He later worked for stations including KVAN in Vancouver, Washington, and KXOA in Sacramento.

A 1947 advertisement in Broadcasting magazine promoted his KYA program, stating: "Bud spins the top Western discs in a free and easy way. His breezy banter and songs of the range corrals listeners ... rounds up prospects ... gets YOUR brand on 'em first!" Hobbs also made appearances on coast-to-coast radio programs during this period.

On television he was a frequent guest on Cousin Herb's Trading Post, a variety program broadcast by KERO-TV in Bakersfield. He subsequently hosted his own shows on stations including KPIX in San Francisco and KOBTV in Albuquerque.

== Personal life ==
Like many country performers of his era, Hobbs struggled with alcohol, and his arrests occasionally drew press attention. In March 1941 the Daily Report of Ontario, California, reported that his detention "reportedly required half the police force to accomplish" after he allegedly damaged a local lunch counter; he was fined $200 or sentenced to 90 days in jail for intoxication and disturbing the peace. A decade later, during his time in Sacramento, the Sacramento Bee ran the headline "Police Search for Bud Hobbs Is Pressed" in connection with another incident.

Accounts from family members emphasize a different side of his personality, describing him as ebullient and generous. While living in Los Angeles he socialized with fellow entertainers, and on one occasion brought Clayton Moore, television's Lone Ranger, to meet his young relatives in Bakersfield.

== Death and legacy ==
Hobbs worked for a period at Floyd's Hardware in Bakersfield. On July 18, 1958, he died at a Bakersfield hospital at the age of 38.

In the 21st century, Hobbs's complete recordings for MGM were reissued by the British Archive of Country Music (BACM). His songs have also appeared on compilation releases from labels such as Jasmine Records, Atomicat Records, and Chief Records.

He was inducted into the Western Swing Society Hall of Fame in 1984.
