= Wishful Thinking (Wynn Stewart song) =

Single by Wynn Stewart
- B-side: "Uncle Tom Got Caught"
- Released: October 1959
- Recorded: July 1959; Hollywood, California, U.S.
- Genre: Country; Bakersfield Sound
- Length: 2:41
- Label: Challenge Records
- Songwriter(s): Wynn Stewart
- Producer(s): Joe Johnson

Wynn Stewart singles chronology
"Above and Beyond (The Call of Love)" (1959)	"Wishful Thinking" (1959)	"Playboy" (1960)

"Wishful Thinking" is a song written and recorded by American country artist Wynn Stewart. It was released as a single in 1959 and became a major hit in early 1960.

== Background and release ==
"Wishful Thinking" was recorded in July 1959 in Hollywood, California. The session was produced by Joe Johnson. Johnson was Stewart's producer while recording for the Challenge record company. Stewart had recently signed with Challenge Records after several years at Capitol Records. At Challenge, he adapted a new musical style that incorporated the Bakersfield Sound. Thom Jurek of Allmusic described songs such as "Wishful Thinking" as influences on future Bakersfield recording artists: "the voice was way out front and yet the band would be chugging along not merely backing up the singer but adding to his lyrics with tasty licks and chops of their own."

"Wishful Thinking" was released as a single on Challenge Records in October 1959. It was his fourth single release with the label. The single spent 22 weeks on the Billboard Country and Western Sides chart and became a major hit, reaching number five in March 1960. "Wishful Thinking" was Stewart's first top ten hit as a recording artist and his second biggest hit in his career. He would have two additional charting singles on Challenge Records before leaving the label in 1963.

== Track listings ==
7" vinyl single

- "Wishful Thinking" – 2:41
- "Uncle Tom Got Caught" – 2:09

== Chart performance ==
Chart (1959–1960)	Peak position
US Hot Country Songs (Billboard)	5
