= It's a Beautiful Day (Wynn Stewart song) =

Single by Wynn Stewart

from the album It's a Beautiful Day
- B-side: "Prisoner on the Run"
- Released: July 1970
- Recorded: 1970
- Studio: Capitol Recording Studio
- Genre: Country; traditional country
- Length: 1:58
- Label: Capitol
- Songwriter: Tracy Pendarvis
- Producer: George Richey

Wynn Stewart singles chronology
| "You Don't Care What Happens to Me" (1970) | "It's a Beautiful Day" (1970) | "Heavenly" (1970) |

"It's a Beautiful Day" is a song written by Tracy Pendarvis. It was recorded by American country artist Wynn Stewart. It was released as a single in 1970 and became a major hit that same year.

== Background and release ==
"It's a Beautiful Day" was recorded in 1970 at the Jack Clement Studio, located in Nashville, Tennessee. The session was produced by George Richey, who had just begun producing Stewart. In previous years, Stewart was produced by Ken Nelson.

"It's a Beautiful Day" was released as a single on Capitol Records in July 1970. The single spent 13 weeks on the Billboard Hot Country Singles chart, peaking at number 13 as well in October 1970 The song was Stewart's final major hit on Capitol Records. He would leave the label in 1971 and switch to RCA Records and later, Playboy Records. In Canada, the song became a top 40 hit single. It peaked at number 33 on the RPM Country Songs chart that same year. It was among his final charting singles in Canada.

== Track listings ==
7" vinyl single

- "It's a Beautiful Day" – 2:34
- "Prisoner on the Run" – 3:53

== Chart performance ==
| Chart (1970) | Peak position |
|---|---|
| Canada Country Songs (RPM) | 33 |
| US Hot Country Songs (Billboard) | 13 |
