= George W. Weston =

American singer

George Weston (born August 10, 1931 – October 31, 2006) was an American singer.

== Early life ==
He was born in Los Angeles, California and was raised on a farm in Little Rock, California.

== Career ==
His first record was for Tally Records, but found little success. Months later, he recorded for Jackpot (Challenge Records Subsidiary) and succeed for the record - "Hey Little Car Hop" / "Well, Don't You Know". A year later, he recorded for Challenge Records, and Glenn Records. In the late 1960s, he made a few songs with some friends, but they didn't get released until years later. In the 1970s, George bought a plane and flew around America. He played in concerts and recorded, but a breakout hit eluded him.

== Discography ==
Hold Still Baby / I Need You Baby - Tally Records / year-1958

Hey Little Car Hop / Well, Don't You Know - Jackpot / year-1958

Shelly, Shelly / My Foolish Pride - Jackpot / year-1959

Sneakin' / Thirteenth Child - Glenn Records / year-1960

Too Good To Be True / Dead Man - Challenge / year-1960

Fishin / Don't Stay Home With The Blues / year-1960 (either released on Challenge or Glenn)

Searcher / Kilo / Let The Crying Happen / Nine Times Out Of Ten / Self - unissued, recorded circa 1967–1968.
