= Huelyn Duvall =

American singer-songwriter and musician (1939–2019)

- Born: Huelyn Wayne Duvall; August 18, 1939; Garner, Texas, U.S.
- Died: May 15, 2019 (aged 79) Colleyville, Texas, U.S.
- Genres: Rock and roll, rockabilly
- Occupations: Singer-songwriter, musician
- Instruments: Guitar, vocals
- Years active: 1956–2015
- Labels: Challenge, Starfire, Twinkle, Brazos Valley, Rhythm Bomb, Goofin', CAB, Sleazy, Sparton, Apex
- Website: www.huelynduvall.com

Huelyn Wayne Duvall (August 18, 1939 – May 15, 2019) was an American rock and roll and rockabilly musician.

== Career ==
Huelyn Duvall was born on August 18, 1939, in Garner, Texas, to William Daniel Duvall and Ila Lee Measures Duvall. Duvall is known for his 1950's recordings such as "Little Boy Blue", "Boom Boom Baby", "Three Months To Kill", "Pucker Paint", and "Double Talkin' Baby", among others. He has performed with Eddie Cochran, Johnny Horton, Bobby Darin, Dale Hawkins, The Champs, and others. "Little Boy Blue" charted on Billboard in 1958, and Eddie Cochran told him it was one of his favourite songs. Duvall recorded "Boom Boom Baby" two years prior to Billy "Crash" Craddock and his version of "Double Talkin' Baby" was sent to Gene Vincent as well as "Modern Romance" to Sanford Clark.

Duvall died on May 15, 2019, at age 79.

== Legacy ==
Huelyn Duvall was named as an influence by Robert Plant.

== Discography ==
=== Singles ===
- 1957 – "Teen Queen" b/w "Comin' Or Goin'" (Challenge, CH-1012)
- 1958 – "Hum-Dinger" b/w "You Knock Me Out" (Challenge, 59002)
- 1958 – "Little Boy Blue" b/w "Three Months To Kill" (Challenge, 59014) No. 88 U.S. Pop
- 1958 – "Friday Night On A Dollar Bill" b/w "Juliet" (Challenge, 59025)
- 1959 – "Across The Aisle" b/w "It's No Wonder" (Starfire, 600)
- 1959 – "Tearstained Letters" b/w "Beautiful Dreamer" (Twinkle, 506)
- 1960 – "Pucker Paint" b/w "Boom Boom Baby" (Challenge, 59069)
- 2015 – "Blue Suede Shoes" feat. Long John and his Ballroom Kings (Rydell's, RR 721, France)

(Some of the singles were released in Sparton records and Apex in Canada as well)

=== Albums ===
- 2003 – She's My Baby (Brazos Valley Records)
- 2004 – The Reunion (Brazos Valley Records)
- 2004 – Ramblin' + Boppin' (Rhythm Bomb Records)
- 2008 – Get Carried Away (Goofin' Records)
- 2015 – Original Singles Collection (CAB Records)

=== EPs ===
- 2011 – Baby Make A Move (Goofin' Records)
- 2014 – Double Talkin' Baby (Sleazy Records)
- 2016 – Got a Little Girl (CAB Records)
- 2018 – Greetings From El Paso (CAB Records)

=== Compilations ===
- 1996 – Is You is or is You Ain't? (Sundazed Music)
- 2003 – Three Months to Kill (Collector Records)

== Personnel ==
- Huelyn Duvall – Guitar and vocals
- The Jordanaires – Backing vocals on "Friday Night On A Dollar Bill", "You Knock Me Out", "Boom Boom Baby", and the unissued- "Fools Hall Of Fame"
