= Waltz of the Angels =

Single by Wynn Stewart
- B-side: "Why Do I Love You So"
- Released: April 1956
- Recorded: February 8, 1956
- Studio: Capitol (Hollywood)
- Genre: Country
- Length: 3:05
- Label: Capitol
- Songwriters: Dick Reynolds; Jack Rhodes
- Producer: Ken Nelson

Wynn Stewart singles chronology
"I've Waited a Lifetime" (1954)	"Waltz of the Angels" (1956)	"The Keeper of the Keys" (1956)

"Waltz of the Angels" is a song written by Dick Reynolds and Jack Rhodes. It was first recorded by American country artist Wynn Stewart. It was then recorded as a duet between American country artists George Jones and Margie Singleton in 1961. Both versions were major hits on the American country charts.

== Wynn Stewart version ==
"Waltz of the Angels" was recorded on February 8, 1956 at the Capitol Recording Studio, located in Hollywood, California. The session was produced by Ken Nelson, who worked with Stewart while he recorded for the Capitol label. It was the only song recorded during this particular session. The session featured west coast country session musicians such as Ralph Mooney and Joe Maphis.

"Waltz of the Angels" was released as a single on Capitol Records in April 1956. It was his first single release with the label. The year, the single became Stewart's first major hit when it reached number 14 on the Billboard country songs chart.

=== Track listings ===
7" vinyl single

- "Waltz of the Angels" – 3:05
- "Why Do I Love You So" – 2:03

=== Chart performance ===
Chart (1956)	Peak position
US Hot Country Songs (Billboard)	14

== George Jones and Margie Singleton version ==
"Waltz of the Angels"

Single by George Jones and Margie Singleton
- B-side: "Talk About Lovin'"
- Released: April 1962
- Recorded: 1961
- Genre: Country
- Length: 2:45
- Label: UA
- Songwriters: Dick Reynolds and Jack Rhodes
- Producer: Shelby Singleton

George Jones and Margie Singleton singles chronology
"Did I Ever Tell You" (1961)	"Waltz of the Angels" (1962)

"Waltz of the Angels" was then recorded as a duet by George Jones and Margie Singleton was released as the pair's second single from their 1962 duet album, Duets Country Style, and peaked at #11 on the 1962 Billboard Hot Country Songs singles chart.

=== Chart performance ===
Chart (1961–1962)	Peak position
US Hot Country Songs (Billboard)	11
