= Challenge Records (1950s–1960s label) =

- Founded: 1957
- Founder: Gene Autry, Joe Johnson
- Defunct: late 1960s
- Status: Sony/ATV Music Publishing holds the catalog
- Genre: Rock and roll
- Country of origin: United States
- Location: Los Angeles, California

Challenge Records was founded in Los Angeles in 1957 by cowboy singer Gene Autry and former Columbia Records A&R representative Joe Johnson. Autry's involvement with the label was short-lived as he sold his interest to the remaining partners in October 1958.

The label's first success came with instrumental group the Champs, who had their biggest hit in 1958 with "Tequila", a Latin-flavored Rock and roll instrumental song written by Daniel "Danny" Flores and recorded by the Champs themselves. "Tequila" became a No. 1 hit on both the pop and R&B charts at the time of its release and continues to be strongly referenced in pop culture to this day.

== History ==
Challenge Records was founded in Los Angeles, California, in 1957 by cowboy singer Gene Autry and former Columbia Records A&R Representative Joe Johnson. Autry's involvement with the label was short-lived as he sold his interest to the remaining partners in October 1958. The label's first success came with instrumental band The Champs, who had their biggest hit in 1958 with Tequila.

The first Challenge label was blue with silver print, followed after the first half dozen releases by a short-lived light-blue label with red print, then a maroon-colored label with silver print. Finally, around late 1959, the company issued their singles on a green label with silver print. Early Challenge Records releases contained a crest above the Challenge logo with the letters "G A" symbolizing Gene Autry's ownership interest. Jackpot was the sublabel of Challenge, and was only active from 1958 to the following year.

In 1957 Challenge Records signed Dave Burgess (born 1934), a singer-songwriter from California who often recorded under the name Dave Dupré. At the end of 1957, having produced no hits, Challenge Records looked to Burgess, who organized a recording session on December 23 in Hollywood. In the studio that day were Burgess on rhythm guitar, Cliff Hills on bass guitar, the Flores Trio (Danny Flores on saxophone and keyboards, Gene Alden on drums, and lead guitarist Buddy Bruce), and Huelyn Duvall contributing backing vocals. They gathered primarily to record "Train to Nowhere", a song by Burgess, as well as "Night Beat" and "All Night Rock".

The last tune recorded was "Tequila", essentially just a jam by the Flores Trio. It is based on a Cuban mambo beat. The word "Tequila" is spoken three times throughout the tune. There were three takes, and Danny Flores, who wrote the song, was also the man who spoke the word "Tequila!". Flores also played the trademark "dirty sax" solo. The song served as the B-side for "Train to Nowhere", which was released by Challenge Records on January 15, 1958. Duvall recalls that the record initially found little success, but, after a DJ in Cleveland played the B-side, "Tequila" skyrocketed up the charts, reaching No. 1 on the Billboard chart on March 28, 1958.

Daniel "Danny" Flores had written "Tequila", but, because he was signed to another label, the tune was credited to Chuck Rio, a name he adopted for the stage. Those present for the December 23 session began recording together again on January 20, 1958, under the name the Champs; the group technically was formed after recording "Tequila". The Champs recorded a sequel to "Tequila" entitled "Too Much Tequila". Released as a maroon-label Challenge single, it reached No. 30 on the Billboard Hot 100.

The group also had a series of hits with pop singer Jerry Wallace ("Primrose Lane") and country singer Wynn Stewart ("Wishful Thinking"). Other recording artists with the label included Jan and Dean, Gary Usher, the Knickerbockers, and singer-songwriter Jerry Fuller.

Challenge Records went out of business in the late 1960s. Sony/ATV Music Publishing owns the catalog today.

== Challenge Records artists ==
- Bobby Austin
- Gene Autry
- Marty Balin
- The Brogues
- The Champs
- Huelyn Duvall
- Jan Howard
- Al Hurricane
- Jan & Dean
- Johnny & Jonie
- The Knickerbockers
- Baker Knight
- The Kuf-Linx
- Donna Loren
- Darnell Miller
- Bob Morris
- Willie Nelson
- The Peanut Butter Conspiracy
- We The People
- Wynn Stewart
- Gene Vincent
- Jerry Wallace
- The Falling Leaves
- The Four Teens
- Dave Burgess
- Dean Beard
- Rochell & the Candles
- Kip Tyler and the Flips
- Kip Tyler
- George W. Weston

== See also ==
- List of record labels
