= It's Such a Pretty World Today =

1967 single by Wynn Stewart

Single by Wynn Stewart

from the album It's Such a Pretty World Today
- B-side: "Ol' What's Her Name"
- Released: January 1967
- Studio: Capitol Recording Studio
- Genre: Country
- Length: 2:30
- Label: Capitol
- Songwriter: Dale Noe
- Producer: Ken Nelson

Wynn Stewart singles chronology
"Angels Don't Lie" (1966)	"It's Such a Pretty World Today" (1967)	"'Cause I Have You" (1967)

"It's Such a Pretty World Today" is a popular song released in 1967, written by songwriter Dale Noe.

== Wynn Stewart version ==
The song was originally a country music single by singer Wynn Stewart. Although Stewart had previously hit the Top 40 on the Billboard US country chart with songs such as "Wishful Thinking" in 1960, "It's Such a Pretty World Today" was Stewart's highest charting hit, peaking at No.1 on the country music chart for two weeks in the late spring of 1967. It was released as a single from his album of the same name that year.

=== Track listing ===
7" vinyl single

- "It's Such a Pretty World Today" – 2:30
- "Ol' What's Her Name" – 2:42 by Fuzzy Owen

=== Chart performance ===
Chart (1967)	Peak position
U.S. Billboard Hot Country Singles	1

== Other versions ==
=== Andy Russell version ===
"It's Such a Pretty World Today"

Single by Andy Russell
- B-side: "Summer Roses"
- Released: 1967
- Genre: Easy listening
- Length: 2:20
- Label: Capitol
- Songwriter: Dale Noe
- Producer: Al De Lory

Andy Russell singles chronology
"Sweet Someone" (1966)	"It's Such a Pretty World Today" (1967)	"I'm Still Not Through Missing You" (1967)

That same year, Mexican-American singer Andy Russell recorded a cover version of the song. Russell had enjoyed quite a bit of popularity in the U.S. throughout the 1940s and 1950s, recording songs such as "Bésame Mucho" and co-starring in a short-lived daily musical show with his then-wife, Della, on ABC from 1950-1951. After the couple divorced, Russell left the U.S. and attained great success in Mexico and Latin America as a singer, actor, and host of his own television show. He returned in the mid 1960s and tried resurrecting his singing career. Although his cover of "It's Such a Pretty World Today" failed to reach the Billboard Hot 100 pop chart (it "bubbled under", peaking at No. 119), it did spend one week at No. 1 on the adult contemporary chart, making the song the first to top the AC chart while not entering the pop chart.

=== Other versions ===
Other artists who have recorded cover versions of the song include:

- Loretta Lynn, whose version appears on her 1967 album Singin' with Feelin'
- Nancy Sinatra, who also recorded the song in 1967 and included it on her album Country, My Way (that version of the song can be heard near the end of the fourth episode of the second season of the AMC crime drama Breaking Bad, "Down".
- Connie Smith also in 1967 on her Soul of Country Music album
- Marie Osmond, whose version appears on her 1973 album Paper Roses
- Singer Mark Dinning reached #117 in the Record World Magazine charts.
- The Jimmy Bowen Singers released a version of the song as a single in 1967, but it did not chart
