= Wynn Stewart =

American country singer-songwriter (1934–1985)

- Stewart in the 1950s

Background information
- Also known as: Wynn Stewart
- Born: Winford Lindsey Stewart; June 7, 1934
- Origin: Morrisville, Missouri
- Died: July 17, 1985 (aged 51)
- Genres: Country, Bakersfield sound, rockabilly
- Occupation: singer-songwriter
- Instruments: vocals, guitar
- Years active: 1954–1985
- Labels: Capitol Records; Playboy Records; Challenge Records
- Website: Wynn Stewart Official Site

Winford Lindsey "Wynn" Stewart (June 7, 1934 – July 17, 1985) was an American country music singer and songwriter. He was one of the progenitors of the Bakersfield sound. Although not a huge chart success, he was an inspiration to such artists as Buck Owens, Merle Haggard and Nick Lowe.

== Biography ==
=== Early life and rise to fame ===
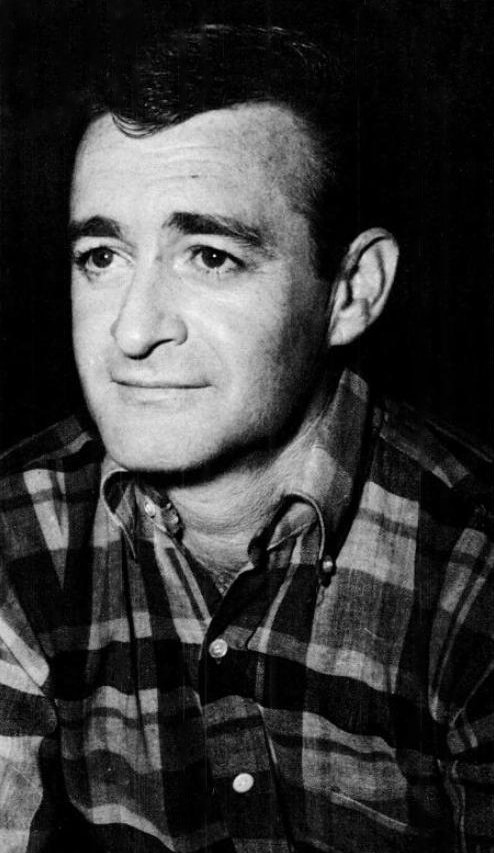
Stewart in 1970

Stewart was born in Morrisville, Missouri, United States, in 1934, during the Depression. He spent most of his childhood moving around the country with his sharecropping family. After World War II, Stewart spent a year working at KWTO in Springfield, Missouri. In 1948, he moved to California with his family. Stewart originally wanted to become a professional baseball player, but suffered from a hand disease and was also too short to play professional baseball. In high school, Stewart formed a band that played at clubs around California. He soon met steel guitarist Ralph Mooney, who joined Stewart's band. The group's lineup consisted of guitarist Roy Nichols and bassist Bobby Austin.

In 1954, Stewart signed a recording contract with an independent record label called Intro Records. He released two singles on Intro. The first was called "I've Waited a Lifetime" and the second was "Strolling". Both failed to reach on the country music chart. His second single caught the attention of Skeets McDonald, one of Stewart's idols. He liked the song so much, he arranged an audition with Capitol Records for Stewart. By the summer of 1956, Stewart signed with Capitol. He soon recorded and released his first single from the label, "Waltz of the Angels", that same year. The song went to No. 14 on the country chart, and gave Stewart his first major hit. The song later became a duet hit for George Jones and Margie Singleton. However, Stewart did not stay with Capitol much longer as none of his other singles was gaining much success. His last single for Capitol (until his 1960s return) was called "I Wish I Could Stay the Same", released in September 1957.

=== Nightclub owner ===
Stewart was part owner of a Las Vegas, Nevada, nightclub called Nashville Nevada during the early 1960s. He performed there six nights a week and also hosted his own television show. A young Merle Haggard sat in with the band while Stewart was out of town in 1962. Stewart returned early, was impressed with Haggard's performance, and hired him as his regular bass player. He wrote Haggard's first hit "Sing a Sad Song".

"Wynn's sound was what influenced Buck and me both," Haggard has said, "and in a strange twist of fate, his band was the heart of the old Frizzell band – Roy Nichols was part of the Lefty band, and he went to Wynn Stewart and ran into Ralph Mooney, who played the steel, and they were the basis of the modern West Coast sound."

=== Height of his career ===
With the help of songwriter Harlan Howard, Stewart signed with Challenge Records in 1958. He recorded a string of singles that were a mix of different styles, ranging from pop to rockabilly. In 1959, he moved to the parent Challenge label and released a single called "Wishful Thinking". The song proved a breakthrough for Stewart when it reached No. 5 in 1960. Following the song's success, Stewart moved to Las Vegas, Nevada, where he hosted a local TV show and was part owner of a nightclub, The Nashville Nevada.

Stewart continued to have sizable hits, including the Jan Howard duet called "Wrong Company", and "Big, Big Love", among others. Stewart moved back to the center of the Bakersfield sound, California, in 1965. He re-signed with Capitol. Cliffie Stone, who was an A & R director with Capitol introduced Wynn to a young arranger-guitarist Bill Aken (Zane Ashton) who would often over-dub unique guitar parts on Wynn's recordings. His first couple of singles for the label proved unsuccessful once again for Stewart, but his fifth single was a different story. "It's Such a Pretty World Today" was released in 1967 and became the biggest hit of his career. The song went to No. 1 on the country music chart and spent two weeks there. It was also the country music Song of the Year and a Gold record. Its follow-up, "Cause I Have You", was a Top 10 hit in 1967. Following his singles' success, Stewart recorded more soft, pop-friendly material, which gave Stewart his biggest hits into the 1970s.

By 1972, Stewart moved to RCA Records with "Paint Me a Rainbow" being his biggest hit for the label. He also briefly signed with Atlantic Records in 1974. Over the next three years, Stewart released singles but did not break the country Top 40. In 1975, he signed with Playboy Records and managed a Top 10 hit in 1976 called "After The Storm". Although he stayed with Playboy, he only had one other big hit, his version of "Sing a Sad Song", which went to No. 19 in 1977.

=== Later career and death ===
Stewart started his own label in 1978 called WIN. His first single, "Eyes as Big as Dallas", broke the Top 40. Although country music was changing in the late 1970s, moving to the smooth sounds of country pop, he was not able to continue to achieve success, which was hampered by his alcoholism. In the early 1980s, Stewart quit performing, but a few years on and Stewart launched a comeback, with an extensive tour and a new album.

During the tour, Stewart suddenly died of a heart attack on July 17, 1985. Following Stewart's death, his song "Wait 'Til I Get My Hands on You" became a minor hit.

== Commercials ==
In 2010, Volkswagen used Stewart's song "Another Day, Another Dollar" in an ad for the Jetta.

Kmart also used Wynn's recording of "It's Such a Pretty World Today" on a Blue light special commercial.
