= Bakersfield sound =

Sub-genre of country music

- Stylistic origins: Country; rock and roll; rockabilly; honky tonk
- Cultural origins: Mid- to late 1950s, California, United States
- Typical instruments: Guitar; fiddle; bass; drums; banjo; pedal steel guitar; piano; vocals

Fusion genres
- Country rock; progressive country; outlaw country

Other topics
- List of country musicians; list of years in country music

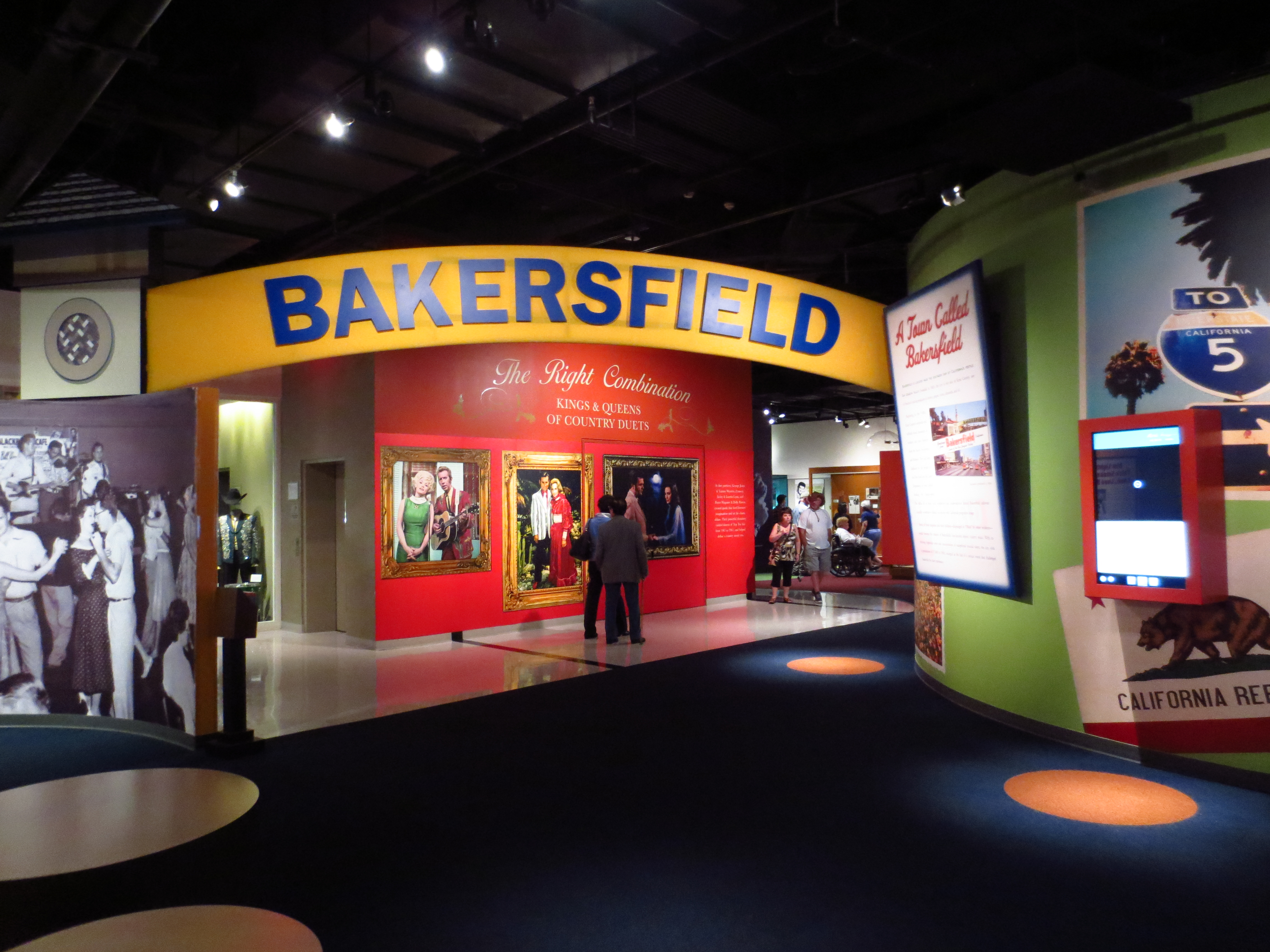
Bakersfield Exhibition Entrance Country Music Hall of Fame and Museum

The Bakersfield sound is a sub-genre of country music developed in the mid-to-late 1950s in and around Bakersfield, California. Bakersfield is defined by its influences of rock and roll and honky-tonk style country, and its heavy use of electric instrumentation and backbeats. It was also a reaction against the slickly produced, orchestra-laden Nashville sound, which was becoming popular in the late 1950s. The Bakersfield sound became one of the most popular and influential country genres of the 1960s, initiating a revival of honky-tonk music and influencing later country rock and outlaw country musicians, as well as progressive country.

Wynn Stewart pioneered the Bakersfield sound, while the performing artists Buck Owens and Merle Haggard became two of the most successful artists of the original Bakersfield era while performing with the Buckaroos and the Strangers respectively.

== History ==
The Bakersfield sound was developed at honky-tonk bars such as The Blackboard, and on local television stations in Bakersfield and throughout California in the 1950s and 1960s. The town, known mainly for agriculture and oil production, was the destination for many Dust Bowl migrants and others from Oklahoma, Texas, Arkansas, and parts of the Midwest. The mass migration of "Okies" to California also meant their music would follow and thrive, finding an audience in California's Central Valley.

Bakersfield country was a reaction to the slickly produced, string orchestra-laden Nashville sound, which was becoming popular in the late 1950s. One of the first groups to make it big on the West Coast was the Maddox Brothers and Rose, who were the first to wear outlandish costumes and make a "show" out of their performances. Artists such as Wynn Stewart used electric instruments and added a backbeat, as well as other stylistic elements borrowed from rock and roll. Important influences were the Depression-era country music superstar Jimmie Rodgers, the early 1950s honky tonk singer Lefty Frizzell, and the 1940s Western swing musician Bob Wills.

In 1954, the MGM recording artist Bud Hobbs recorded "Louisiana Swing" with Buck Owens on lead guitar, Bill Woods on piano, and the dual fiddles of Oscar Whittington and Jelly Sanders. "Louisiana Swing" was the first song recorded in the style known today as the "Bakersfield sound". In the early 1960s, Merle Haggard and Buck Owens and the Buckaroos, among others, brought the Bakersfield sound to mainstream audiences, and it soon became one of the most popular sounds in country music, helping spawn country rock and influencing later country stars such as Dwight Yoakam, Marty Stuart, the Mavericks, and the Derailers. Jean Shepard, one of country music's first significant female artists, began her recording career on the West Coast in the 1950s. Through Capitol Records, Shepard's "A Dear John Letter", was the first major country hit single to use entirely Bakersfield musicians. Many of her early recording sessions featured prominent members of the Bakersfield movement, including Lewis Talley and Speedy West. Susan Raye was also a major figure in the Bakersfield sound, particularly in the 1970s, with hits such as "L.A. International Airport". She was also a member of Buck Owens's road show and recorded several hit duets with him. Other women to emerge from the West Coast country movement include Bonnie Owens, Kay Adams, and Rosie Flores.

The Bakersfield sound has such a large influence on the West Coast music scene that many small guitar companies set up shop in Bakersfield in the 1960s. The Mosrite guitar company was located in the Bakersfield area until the mid-1970s.

The Bakersfield music scene remained markedly separate from the Nashville Music Row industry at the time, as the major radio station in Nashville, WSM, did not reach California. No Bakersfield natives (or any other Californians until Jon Pardi achieved the feat in 2023) were ever inducted into the cast of WSM's flagship Grand Ole Opry.

=== Buck Owens and the Buckaroos ===
Buck Owens and the Buckaroos developed it further, incorporating different styles of music to fit Owens' musical tastes. The music style features a raw set of twin Fender Telecasters with a picking style (as opposed to strumming), a big drum beat, and fiddle, with an occasional prominent pedal steel guitar solo. The Fender Telecaster was originally developed for country musicians to fit in with the Texas/Western swing style of music that was popular in the Western US following World War II. The music, like Owens, was rebellious for its time and is dependent on a musician's individual talents, as opposed to the elaborate orchestral production common with Nashville-style "countrypolitan" music.

Buck Owens not only aided in the development of the Bakersfield sound, he also helped preserve its history. In 1996, Owens opened Buck Owens Crystal Palace in Bakersfield, which served as both a nightclub for country music performers and as a museum of the history and sound of country music, including the Bakersfield sound. Owens regularly performed at the Crystal Palace until his death in 2006.

In an interview, Dwight Yoakam defined the term "Bakersfield sound":

"Bakersfield" really is not exclusively limited to the town itself but encompasses the larger California country sound of the '40s, '50s and on into the '60s, and even the '70s, with the music of Emmylou Harris, Gram Parsons, the Burrito Brothers and the Eagles – they are all an extension of the "Bakersfield sound" and a byproduct of it. I've got a poster of Buck Owens performing at the Fillmore West in 1968 in Haight-Ashbury! What went on there led to there being a musical incarnation called country rock. I don't know if there would have been a John Fogerty and Creedence Clearwater Revival had there not been the California country music that's come to be known as the "Bakersfield sound".

The magazines No Depression and Blue Suede News regularly feature Bakersfield sound enthusiasts, while podcasts such as Radio Free Bakersfield carry the tradition online.

=== Merle Haggard ===
Besides Buck Owens, Merle Haggard, a Country Music Hall of Fame inductee, was the most well-known artist involved in the development of the Bakersfield Sound. As a child, Haggard spent a lot of his time listening to the records his mother had given him, particularly those of the Maddox Brothers and Rose, Bob Wills, and Lefty Frizell, who he described as his hero. A son of two Okie parents and a troublemaker from a young age, his music often touched on themes of outlaw living, the Okie experience in California's Central Valley, and working class pride. His most famous song, Mama Tried, is based on his real life experiences of being a rebel child, going to prison, and his mother's refusal to give up on him despite his troublemaker behavior. In songs like Mama's Hungry Eyes and Working Man Blues, Haggard alludes to the social inferiority of Okies and the struggle of providing for one's family while working in rural California. Merle Haggard's music is considered to have kept the Central Valley, and the many Dust Bowl migrants who came there to work, alive through his songs. Bakersfield author Gerald Haslam stated that "Merle is most a representative of The Other California when he writes with the voice of someone outside the state's paradigm of success . . . he offers glimpses into lives lived out of the mainstream, on an economic edge and often under a lingering racial or social stereotype. . . . Merle seems to be saying, among other things, 'Hey, we exist, too. Without us, there is no state.'" His lyrical allusions to the ordinary life earned him the nickname of the Poet of the Common Man.
