= Bill Anderson singles discography =

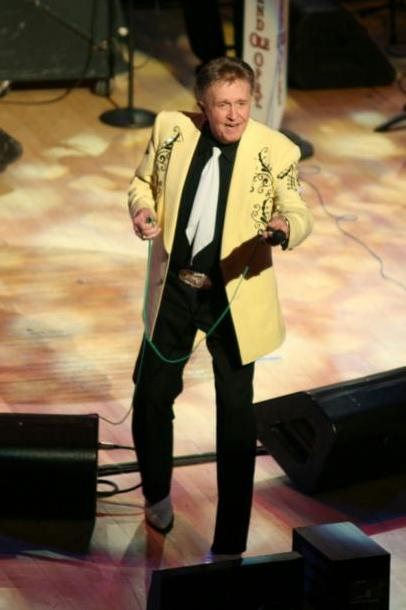
- Anderson at the Grand Ole Opry
- Singles: 84
- Music videos: 4
- Promotional singles: 3
- Other charted songs: 6

The singles discography of American country singer-songwriter Bill Anderson contains 84 singles, three promotional singles, 6 other charted songs and four music videos. After signing to Decca Records in 1958, Anderson released a series of early singles that became hits, reaching the top ten and 20. This included "That's What It's Like to Be Lonesome" (1958), "The Tip of My Fingers" (1960) and "Po' Folks" (1961). The following year, he reached number one on the Billboard Country and Western Sides chart with "Mama Sang a Song." In 1963, Anderson released his most commercially successful single, "Still." The song was his second number one country single and his first (and only) top ten hit on the Billboard Hot 100, climbing to number eight. His follow-up single, "8×10" reached similar crossover success. Anderson released 11 more top ten country hits during the rest of the decade. This included the number one singles "I Get the Fever" (1966) and "My Life (Throw It Away If I Want To)" (1969). He also had a number one hit with Jan Howard called "For Loving You" in 1968. Anderson also had top ten hits with "I Love You Drops" (1965), "Happy State of Mind" (1968) and a cover of "But You Know I Love You" (1969).

Anderson would have 16 additional top ten country hits during the 1970s. In the early decade he had hits with "Love Is a Sometimes Thing," "Quits" and "If You Can Live with It (I Can Live Without It)." His 1973 single "World of Make Believe" reached number one on the Billboard country chart. He collaborated with Mary Lou Turner in 1976 on the single "Sometimes," which became his final number one hit. Anderson's style shifted towards a Countrypolitan direction in the late 1970s, but he continued having major hits. This included "I Can't Wait Any Longer" (1978), which was his final top ten hit, reaching number four. Anderson's final top 20 hit was "This Is a Love Song" in 1979. Before leaving Decca (now MCA Records), he released his final top 40 single, "Make Mine Night Time." Anderson recorded sporadically during the 1980s for independent labels, but continued to have charting singles. Among these tunes was "When You Leave That Way You Can Never Go Back" in 1985. His 1991 release, "Deck of Cards," was also his final charting single, reaching number 60 on the country songs chart.

== Singles ==
=== As lead artist ===
List of singles, with selected chart positions, showing other relevant details
Title	Year	Peak chart positions					Album
Title	Year	US	US Cou.	US AC	AUS	CAN Cou.	Album
"Take Me"	1957	—	—	—	—	—	—N/a
"City Lights"	1958	—	—	—	—	—	—N/a
"That's What It's Like to Be Lonesome"	1958	—	12	—	—	—	—N/a
"Ninety-Nine"	1959	—	13	—	—	—	—N/a
"Dead or Alive"	1959	—	19	—	—	—	—N/a
"The Tip of My Fingers"	1960	—	7	—	—	—	—N/a
"Walk Out Backwards"	1960	—	9	—	—	—	—N/a
"Po' Folks"	1961	—	9	—	—	—	—N/a
"Get a Little Dirt on Your Hands"	1962	—	14	—	—	—	Still
"Mama Sang a Song"	1962	89	1	—	45	—	Bill Anderson Sings Country Heart Songs
"Still"	1963	8	1	3	32	—	Still
"8×10"	1963	53	2	18	—	—	Bill Anderson Sings
"Five Little Fingers"	1963	— (Note: "Five Little Fingers" did not enter the Hot 100, but peaked at number 14 on Bubbling Under Hot 100 Singles, which acts as a 25-song extension of the Hot 100.)	5	—	—	—	Bill Anderson Sings
"Me"	1964	—	8	—	—	—	Showcase
"Three A.M."	1964	—	8	—	—	—	Showcase
"Certain"	1965	—	12	—	—	—	I Love You Drops
"Bright Lights and Country Music"	1965	—	11	—	—	—	Bright Lights and Country Music
"I Love You Drops"	1965	—	4	—	—	—	I Love You Drops
"I Get the Fever"	1966	—	1	—	—	—	I Love You Drops
"Get While the Gettin's Good"	1967	—	5	—	—	—	Get While the Gettin's Good
"No One's Gonna Hurt You Anymore"	1967	—	10	—	—	—	Wild Weekend
"Stranger on the Run"	1967	—	42	—	—	—	—N/a
"Wild Week-End"	1968	—	2	—	—	1	Wild Weekend
"Happy State of Mind"	1968	—	2	—	—	1	Happy State of Mind
"My Life (Throw It Away If I Want To)"	1969	—	1	—	—	2	My Life/But You Know I Love You
"But You Know I Love You"	1969	—	2	—	—	6	My Life/But You Know I Love You
"Love Is a Sometimes Thing"	1970	—	5	—	—	10	Love Is a Sometimes Thing
"Where Have All Our Heroes Gone"	1970	93	6	—	—	9	Where Have All Our Heroes Gone
"Always Remember"	1971	—	6	—	—	5	Always Remember
"Quits"	1971	—	3	—	—	2	Bill Anderson's Greatest Hits, Vol. 2
"All the Lonely Women in the World"	1972	—	5	—	—	2	All the Lonely Women in the World
"Don't She Look Good"	1972	—	2	—	—	2	Don't She Look Good
"If You Can Live with It (I Can Live Without It)"	1973	—	2	—	—	2	Bill
"The Corner of My Life"	1973	—	2	—	—	1	Bill
"World of Make Believe"	1973	—	1	—	—	1	Bill
"Can I Come Home to You"	1974	—	24	—	—	2	"Whispering" Bill Anderson
"Every Time I Turn the Radio On"	1974	—	7	—	—	4	Every Time I Turn the Radio/ Talk to Me Ohio
"I Still Feel the Same About You"	1975	—	14	—	—	16	Every Time I Turn the Radio/ Talk to Me Ohio
"Country D.J."	1975	—	36	—	—	23	Every Time I Turn the Radio/ Talk to Me Ohio
"Thanks"	1975	—	24	—	—	19	Peanuts and Diamonds and Other Jewels
"Peanuts and Diamonds"	1976	—	10	—	—	7	Peanuts and Diamonds and Other Jewels
"Liars One, Believers Zero"	1976	—	6	—	—	5	Peanuts and Diamonds and Other Jewels
"Head to Toe"	1977	—	7	—	—	4	Scorpio
"Still the One"	1977	—	11	—	—	13	Scorpio
"I Can't Wait Any Longer" (Note: "I Can't Wait Any Longer" also peaked at number 99 on the RPM Pop Singles chart in 1978.)	1978	80	4	—	—	1	Love...& Other Sad Stories
"Double S"	1978	—	30	—	—	43	Ladies Choice
"This Is a Love Song"	1979	—	20	—	—	15	Ladies Choice
"The Dream Never Dies"	1979	—	40	—	—	42	—N/a
"More Than a Bedroom Thing"	1979	—	51	—	—	71	Nashville Mirrors
"Make Mine Night Time"	1980	—	35	—	—	—	Nashville Mirrors
"Rock 'n' Roll to Rock of Ages"	1980	—	58	—	—	—	—N/a
"I Want That Feelin' Again"	1980	—	83	—	—	—	Nashville Mirrors
"Mister Peepers"	1981	—	44	—	—	—	—N/a
"Homebody"	1981	—	74	—	—	—	—N/a
"Whiskey Made Me Stumble (The Devil Made Me Fall)"	1981	—	76	—	—	—	—N/a
"Southern Fried"	1982	—	42	—	—	—	Southern Fried
"Laid Off"	1982	—	82	—	—	—	Southern Fried
"Thank You Darling"	1983	—	70	—	—	—	Southern Fried
"Son of the South"	1983	—	71	—	—	—	Southern Fried
"Your Eyes"	1984	—	76	—	—	—	A Place in the Country
"We May Never Pass This Way Again" (Note: "We May Never Pass This Way Again" is included on the 1988 version of A Place in the Country.)	1984	—	—	—	—	—	A Place in the Country
"Pity Party"	1985	—	62	—	—	—	Yesterday, Today, and Tomorrow
"Wino the Clown"	1985	—	58	—	—	—	Yesterday, Today, and Tomorrow
"When You Leave That Way You Can Never Go Back"	1985	—	75	—	—	—	Yesterday, Today, and Tomorrow
"Sheet Music"	1986	—	80	—	—	—	A Place in the Country
"No Ordinary Memory"	1987	—	78	—	—	—	A Place in the Country
"The Deck of Cards"	1991	—	60	—	—	—	The Best of Bill Anderson
"Country Music Heaven"	1992	—	—	—	—	—	Country Music Heaven
"Him and Me"	2005	—	—	—	—	—	The Way I Feel
"Thanks to You"	2010	—	—	—	—	—	Songwriter
"Gone Away" (featuring The Oak Ridge Boys)	2012	—	—	—	—	—	—N/a
"Until the Light Comes on Again"	2018	—	—	—	—	—	—N/a
"Everybody Wants to Be Twenty One"	2018	—	—	—	—	—	Anderson
"Waffle House Christmas"	2018	—	—	—	—	—	Anderson
"—" denotes a recording that did not chart or was not released in that territory.

=== As a collaborative artist ===
List of singles, with selected chart positions, showing other relevant details
Title	Year	Peak chart positions		Album
Title	Year	US Cou.	CAN Cou.	Album
"I Know You're Married (But I Love You Still)" (with Jan Howard)	1965	29	—	If It's All the Same to You
"For Loving You" (with Jan Howard)	1967	1	9	For Loving You
"If It's All the Same to You" (with Jan Howard)	1969	2	8	If It's All the Same to You
"Someday We'll Be Together" (with Jan Howard)	1970	4	3	Bill and Jan (Or Jan and Bill)
"Dis-Satisfied" (with Jan Howard)	1971	4	11	Bill and Jan (Or Jan and Bill)
"Sometimes" (with Mary Lou Turner)	1975	1	3	Sometimes
"That's What Made Me Love You" (with Mary Lou Turner)	1976	7	2	Sometimes
"Where Are You Going, Billy Boy" (with Mary Lou Turner)	1977	18	22	Billy Boy and Mary Lou
"I'm Way Ahead of You" (with Mary Lou Turner)	1978	25	30	Billy Boy and Mary Lou
"—" denotes a recording that did not chart or was not released in that territory.

=== As a featured artist ===
List of singles, with selected chart positions, showing other relevant details
Title	Year	Peak chart positions	Album
Title	Year	US Country	Album
"Get a Little Dirt on Your Hands" (David Allan Coe featuring Bill Anderson)	1980	46	I've Got Something to Say

== Promotional singles ==
List of singles, showing all relevant details
Title	Year	Album	Ref.
"Down Came the Rain"	1964	Still	
"Cincinnati, Ohio"	1964	Showcase	
"Homebody"	1981	—N/a	

== Other charted songs ==
List of singles, with selected chart positions, showing other relevant details
Title	Year	Peak chart positions	Album	Notes
Title	Year	US Country	Album	Notes
"Easy Come – Easy Go"	1964	14	Bill Anderson Sings	(Note: Released as the B-side to "Five Little Fingers".)
"In Case You Ever Change Your Mind"	1964	38	Showcase	(Note: Released as the B-side to "Three A.M.")
"Time Out" (with Jan Howard)	1965	44	If It's All the Same to You	(Note: Released as the B-side to the single "I Know You're Married (But I Love You Still)")
"Golden Guitar"	1965	11	Bright Lights and Country Music	(Note: Released as the B-side to "I Love You Drops".)
"Papa"	1967	64	I Can Do Nothing Alone	(Note: Released as the B-side to "No One's Gonna Hurt You Anymore".)
"20th Century Fox"	1983	71	Southern Fried	(Note: Released as a double A-side single to "Son of the South".)

== Music videos ==
List of music videos, showing year released and director
Title	Year	Director(s)	Ref.
"I Wonder If God Likes Country Music"	1991	Stan Moore	
"Thanks to You"	2010	Billy Brown, Lee Willard	
"Old Army Hat"	2014	Billy Brown, Lee Willard	
"Waffle House Christmas" (featuring various artists)	2018	Lee Willard	
