= Bill Anderson albums discography =

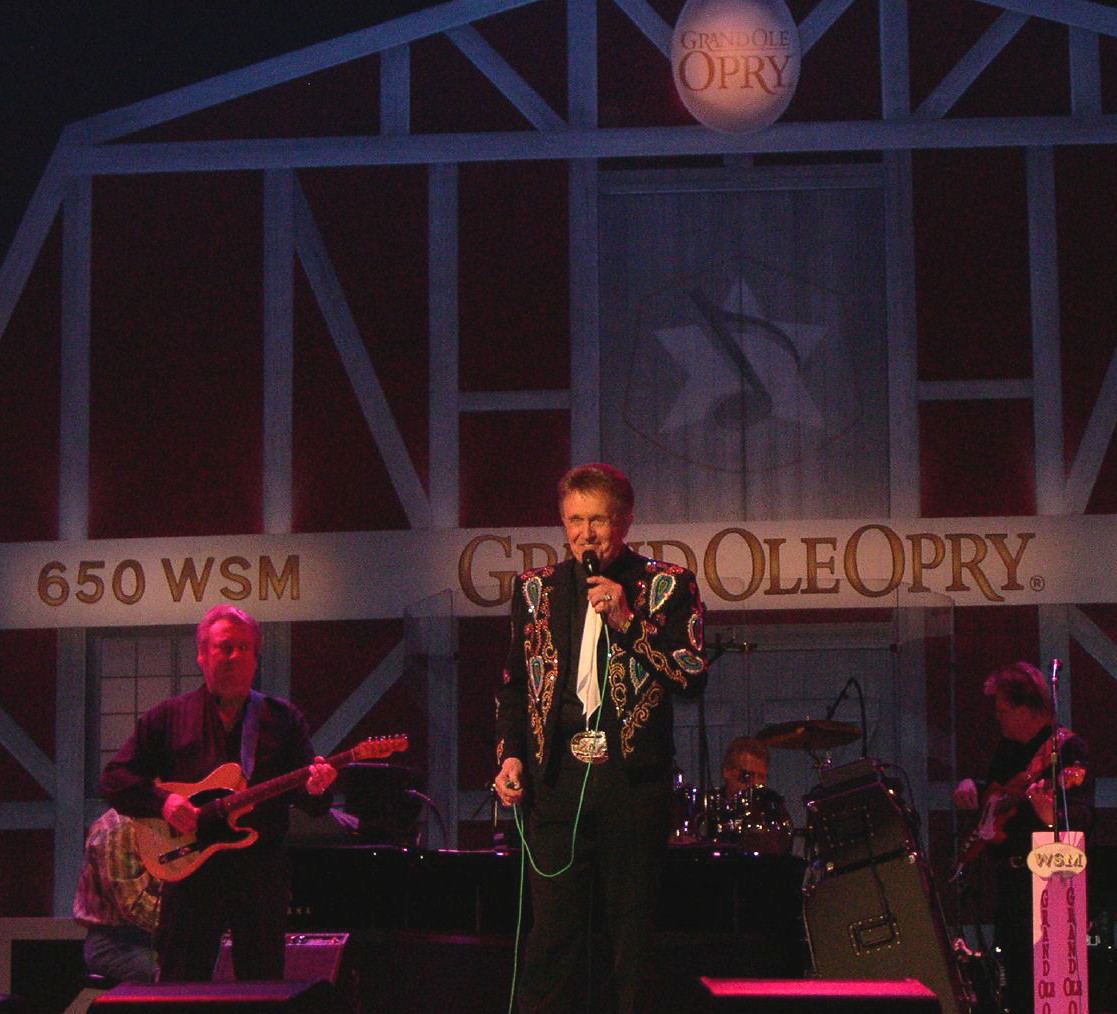
- Bill Anderson, 2006
- Studio albums: 45
- EPs: 4
- Live albums: 3
- Compilation albums: 13
- Box sets: 1
- Other album appearances: 16

The albums discography of American country singer-songwriter Bill Anderson contains 45 studio albums, three live albums, 13 compilation albums, four extended plays and one box set. He first signed with Decca Records in 1958 and started releasing singles which became major hits. However, Anderson's first album was not released until 1962. Entitled Bill Anderson Sings Country Heart Songs, the package was a compilation release containing his major hits up to that point. His debut studio release, Still, followed upon the success of its title track in 1963. The release peaked at number 10 on the Billboard Top Country Albums chart and number 36 on the Billboard 200, his only album to chart the latter survey. Over the next decade, Anderson released several albums per year, many of which reached the top ten on the Billboard country albums chart. His second studio release, Bill Anderson Sings (1964), reached number seven on the chart for example. In 1966, his fifth studio album, I Love You Drops, reached number one the country albums list. In 1967, Anderson recorded his first album of gospel music called I Can Do Nothing Alone, which reached number 23 on the country albums survey. His eighth studio record, For Loving You (1968), was a collaborative project with Jan Howard. It reached number six on the country albums chart.

Anderson continued releasing several albums per year into the 1970s. In the early half of the decade, only three studio projects reached the country albums top ten: Love Is a Sometimes Thing (1970), Bill and Jan (Or Jan and Bill) (1972), and Don't She Look Good (1972). By this period, he had released his second greatest hits package as well. In 1973, his label was renamed to MCA Records and his first album on the label was Bill, which reached number 15 on the Top Country Albums chart. In 1976, he collaborated on the first of two albums with Mary Lou Turner. Anderson's sound shifted towards a Countrypolitan style in the late 1970s. His studio releases Love...& Other Sad Stories (1978) and Ladies Choice (1979) were his final charting records on the country albums survey. Anderson continued releasing studio albums on independent labels in the 1980s, before recording Fine Wine (1998) for Warner Bros. Records. He then developed his own label, TWI, where he has been releasing new music since. His most recent studio record is 2020's The Hits Re-Imagined.

== Studio albums ==
=== As lead artist ===
List of albums, with selected chart positions, showing other relevant details
Title	Album details	Peak chart positions		
Title	Album details	US	US Cou.	CAN Cou.
Still	Released: June 1963; Label: Decca; Formats: LP	36	10	—
Bill Anderson Sings	Released: February 1964; Label: Decca; Formats: LP	—	7	—
Showcase	Released: November 1964; Label: Decca; Formats: LP	—	—	—
I Love You Drops	Released: August 1966; Label: Decca; Formats: LP	—	1	—
Get While the Gettin's Good	Released: February 1967; Label: Decca; Formats: LP	—	8	—
I Can Do Nothing Alone	Released: June 1967; Label: Decca; Formats: LP	—	23	—
Wild Weekend	Released: May 1968; Label: Decca; Formats: LP	—	10	—
Happy State of Mind	Released: September 1968; Label: Decca; Formats: LP	—	24	—
My Life/But You Know I Love You	Released: July 1969; Label: Decca; Formats: LP	—	4	—
Christmas	Released: November 1969; Label: Decca; Formats: LP	—	—	—
Love Is a Sometimes Thing	Released: June 1970; Label: Decca; Formats: LP	—	10	—
Where Have All Our Heroes Gone	Released: December 1970; Label: Decca; Formats: LP	—	27	—
Always Remember	Released: April 1971; Label: Decca; Formats: LP	—	13	—
Bill Anderson Sings for "All the Lonely Women in the World"	Released: May 1972; Label: Deca; Formats: LP	—	14	—
Don't She Look Good	Released: November 1972; Label: Decca; Formats: LP	—	10	—
Bill	Released: July 1973; Label: MCA; Formats: LP	—	15	—
"Whispering" Bill Anderson	Released: June 1974; Label: MCA; Formats: LP	—	17	—
Every Time I Turn the Radio On/ Talk to Me Ohio	Released: January 1975; Label: MCA; Formats: LP	—	22	—
Peanuts and Diamonds and Other Jewels	Released: September 1976; Label: MCA; Formats: LP	—	12	—
Scorpio	Released: April 1977; Label: MCA; Formats: LP	—	21	—
Love...& Other Sad Stories	Released: 1978; Label: MCA; Formats: LP, cassette	—	37	5
Ladies Choice	Released: 1979; Label: MCA; Formats: LP, cassette	—	44	—
Nashville Mirrors	Released: 1980; Label: MCA; Formats: LP, cassette	—	—	—
Yesterday, Today, and Tomorrow	Released: 1984; Label: Swanee; Formats: LP	—	—	—
A Place in the Country	Released: 1986; Label: Po Folks; Formats: LP	—	—	—
Country Music Heaven	Released: February 1993; Label: Curb; Formats: Cassette, CD	—	—	—
Greatest Songs (re-recordings)	Released: November 19, 1996; Label: Curb; Formats: Cassette, CD	—	—	—
Fine Wine	Released: August 25, 1998; Label: Warner Bros.; Formats: Cassette, CD	—	—	—
A Lot of Things Different	Released: August 7, 2001; Label: TWI/Varèse Sarabande; Formats: Cassette, CD	—	—	—
No Place Like Home on Christmas	Released: October 15, 2002; Label: Varèse Sarabande; Formats: Cassette, CD	—	—	—
Softly & Tenderly	Released: June 1, 2004; Label: Madacy/TWI; Formats: CD	—	—	—
The Way I Feel	Released: June 2005; Label: TWI/Varèse Sarabande; Formats: CD, music download	—	—	—
Whisperin' Bluegrass	Released: October 23, 2007; Label: Madacy; Formats: CD, music download	—	—	—
Songwriter	Released: May 2010; Label: TWI; Formats: CD, music download	—	—	—
Life!	Released: March 4, 2014; Label: TWI; Formats: CD, music download	—	—	—
Anderson	Released: September 14, 2018; Label: TWI; Formats: CD, music download	—	—	—
The Hits Re-Imagined (re-recordings)	Released: July 24, 2020; Label: TWI; Formats: CD, music download	—	—	—
"—" denotes a recording that did not chart or was not released in that territory.

=== As a collaboration ===
List of albums, with selected chart positions, showing other relevant details
Title	Album details	Peak chart positions
Title	Album details	US Country
Bright Lights and Country Music (with The Po' Boys)	Released: November 1965; Label: Decca; Formats: LP	6
For Loving You (with Jan Howard)	Released: February 1968; Label: Decca; Formats: LP	6
If It's All the Same to You (with Jan Howard)	Released: March 1970; Label: Decca; Formats: LP	25
Bill and Jan (Or Jan and Bill) (with Jan Howard)	Released: January 1972; Label: Decca; Formats: LP	9
Singing His Praise (with Jan Howard)	Released: March 1972; Label: Decca; Formats: LP	—
Sometimes (with Mary Lou Turner)	Released: January 1976; Label: MCA; Formats: LP	6
Billy Boy & Mary Lou (with Mary Lou Turner)	Released: June 1977; Label: MCA; Formats: LP	39
Southern Fried (with The Po' Folks)	Released: 1983; Label: Southern Tracks; Formats: LP	—
"—" denotes a recording that did not chart or was not released in that territory.

== Compilation albums ==
List of albums, with selected chart positions, showing other relevant details
Title	Album details	Peak chart positions
Title	Album details	US Country
Bill Anderson Sings Country Heart Songs	Released: January 1962; Label: Decca; Formats: LP	—
From This Pen	Released: June 1965; Label: Decca; Formats: LP	7
Bill Anderson's Greatest Hits	Released: October 1967; Label: Decca; Formats: LP	6
Bill Anderson's Country Style	Released: March 1968; Label: Vocalion; Formats: LP	—
The Bill Anderson Story: His Greatest Hits	Released: March 1969; Label: Decca; Formats: LP	43
Bill Anderson's Greatest Hits, Vol. 2	Released: September 1971; Label: Decca; Formats: LP	18
Just Plain Bill	Released: June 1972; Label: Vocalion; Formats: LP	—
Best of Bill Anderson	Released: February 1991; Label: Curb; Formats: Cassette, CD	—
Greatest Hits	Released: 1996; Label: Varese Vintage; Formats: CD	—
Greatest Hits, Volume Two	Released: October 7, 1997; Label: Varese Vintage; Formats: CD	—
The Definitive Collection	Released: June 6, 2006; Label: MCA Nashville; Formats: CD, music download	—
20th Century Masters: The Millennium Collection	Released: July 25, 2006; Label: MCA Nashville; Formats: CD, music download	—
As Far as I Can See: The Best of Bill Anderson	Released: June 10, 2022; Label: UMG Nashville; Formats: CD, music download	—
"—" denotes a recording that did not chart or was not released in that territory.

== Other albums ==
=== Live albums ===
List of albums, showing relevant details
Title	Album details
Live from London	Released: October 1975; Label: MCA; Formats: LP
On the Road with Bill Anderson	Released: November 26, 1980; Label: Stallion; Formats: LP
Bill Anderson Hosts Backstage at the Grand Ole Opry	Released: 1983; Label: RCA; Formats: LP

=== Box sets ===
List of albums, showing relevant details
Title	Album details
The First Ten Years: 1956–1966	Released: November 15, 2011; Label: Bear Family; Formats: CD

=== Extended plays ===
List of albums, showing relevant details
Title	Album details
Country and Western Hitparade, Vol. 1 (with Webb Pierce)	Released: 1962; Label: Brunswick; Formats: LP
Still	Released: 1963; Label: Decca; Formats: LP
Still	Released: 1963; Label: Festival; Formats: LP
Me	Released: 1965; Label: Decca; Formats: LP

== Other album appearances ==
List of non-single guest appearances, with other performing artists, showing year released and album name
Title	Year	Other artist(s)	Album	Ref.
"The First Noel"	1997	—N/a	Country Christmas: Stars of Nashville	
"Loving Arms of Tennessee"	1997	Jimmy Sturr	Living on Polka Time	
"Too Country"	2001	Brad Paisley; Buck Owens; George Jones	Part II	
"The Old Village Church on the Hill"	2002	—N/a	36 Greatest Gospel Memories: A Loving Tribute to Albert E. Brumley	
"Blue Shades"	2002	Elizabeth Cook	Hey Y'all	
"We Must Have Been Out of Our Minds"	2005	Michelle Nixon	What More Should I Say?	
"Too Country" (Live)	2006	Brad Paisley	Grand Ole Opry at Carnegie Hall	
"Kung Pao Buckaroo Holiday" (as the "Kung Pao Buckaroos")	2006	Brad Paisley	Brad Paisley Christmas	
"I'll Go Down Swinging"	2007	Justin Trevino	Take One as Needed for Pain	
"Chip Chip"	2008	Rustie Blue	Stronger Than Steel	
"Leaning on the Everlasting Arms"	2010	George Hamilton IV	Old Fashioned Hymns and Gospel Songs... for Those Who Miss Them!	
"The Guitar Song"	2010	Jamey Johnson	The Guitar Song	
"Twelve Days of Christmas"	2015	Rhonda Vincent	Christmas Time	
"Dying to See Her"	2017	Brad Paisley	Love and War	
"You Can't Rollerskate in a Buffalo Herd"	2018	John Anderson, Bellamy Brothers, Roy Clark, Larry Gatlin, Bobby Goldsboro, Jan Howard, Brenda Lee, Roger Miller, Tanya Tucker	King of the Road: A Tribute to Roger Miller	
"When Two Worlds Collide"	2020	Jeannie Seely	An American Classic	
