= Live from London (Bill Anderson album) =

Live album by Bill Anderson
- Released: October 1975
- Recorded: February 1975
- Venue: Hippodome Golden Green
- Genres: Country; Countrypolitan
- Label: MCA
- Producer: Peter Robinson

Bill Anderson chronology
| Every Time I Turn the Radio On/Talk to Me Ohio (1975) | Live from London (1975) | Sometimes (1976) |

Live from London is a live album by American country singer-songwriter Bill Anderson. It was released in October 1975 via MCA Records and was produced by Peter Robinson. The record was Anderson's first live album and included over ten tracks. It was recorded in the United Kingdom and was released in the country as well. Anderson would record several more live projects during the course of his music career.

== Background and release ==
Live from London was Anderson's first live record. It was recorded at the Hippodome Golden Green, located in London, England. It was recorded officially in front of a live audience in February 1975 and was produced by Peter Robinson. It was Anderson's first album to be produced by somebody other than Owen Bradley, his longtime producer at MCA Records. Also included on the album was Mary Lou Turner and his backing band, The Po' Boys

A total of 14 tracks were included on the album. Included were some of his biggest hits, such as "Po' Folks," "I Love You Drops" and "I Get the Fever." Other tracks included were cover versions of songs by other artists, including "I Still Miss Someone" by Johnny Cash and "Poor Sweet Baby" by Jean Shepard. Dialogue is also included on the album, including a tribute track to the Grand Ole Opry.

The album was released in October 1975 via MCA Records. It was first issued as a vinyl LP, with tracks on each side of the record. Like some of his other compilations, the record did not reach any chart positions on Billboard upon its release. This included the Top Country Albums chart.

== Track listing ==
All tracks written by Bill Anderson, except where noted.

Side one
| No. | Title | Writer(s) | Length |
|---|---|---|---|
| 1. | "Don't She Look Good/If You Can Live with It (I Can Live Without It)" | Anderson; Jerry Chesnut |
| 2. | "Poor Sweet Baby" |
| 3. | "World of Make Believe" | Mario Carpenter; Pee Wee Maddux; Peter McCord |
| 4. | "Po' Folks" |
| 5. | "Happy Birthday to the Grand Ole Opry" |
| 6. | "I Love You Drops/Quits" |
| 7. | "Heavenly Sunshine/Sweet Lovin'" | George Richey; Glenn Sutton |

Side two
| No. | Title | Writer(s) | Length |
|---|---|---|---|
| 1. | "I Get the Fever" |
| 2. | "City Lights" |
| 3. | "Jessica" | Dickey Betts |
| 4. | "Tomorrow" |
| 5. | "Golden Guitar" | Billy Gray; Curtis Leach |
| 6. | "I Still Miss Someone" | Johnny Cash; Roy Cash, Jr. |
| 7. | "The World Needs a Melody" | Larry Henley; Red Lane; Johnny Slate |

== Personnel ==
All credits are adapted from the liner notes of Live from London.

Musical personnel

- Bill Anderson – lead vocals
- Peter Robinson – producer

== Release history ==
| Region | Date | Format | Label | Ref. |
|---|---|---|---|---|
| United Kingdom | October 1975 | Vinyl | MCA Records | |
