= Sometimes =

Sometimes may refer to:

== Music ==
=== Albums ===
- Sometimes (Bill Anderson and Mary Lou Turner album) or the title song (see below), 1976
- Sometimes (City and Colour album) or the title song, "Sometimes (I Wish)", 2005
- Sometimes (Facts of Life album) or the title song, 1977
- Sometimes, by Thomas Knak, 2003

=== Songs ===
- "Sometimes" (Ash song), 2001
- "Sometimes" (Bill Anderson song), 1975
- "Sometimes" (Brand New Heavies song), 1997
- "Sometimes" (Britney Spears song), 1999
- "Sometimes" (Clay Davidson song), 2001
- "Sometimes" (Cub Sport song), 2018
- "Sometimes" (Donkeyboy song), 2009
- "Sometimes" (Erasure song), 1986
- "Sometimes" (Kodaline song), 2020
- "Sometimes" (Max Q song), 1989
- "Sometimes" (Miami Horror song), 2009
- "Sometimes" (Midnight Oil song), 1987
- "Sometimes" (Stranglers song), 1977
- "Sometimes", by After the Fire from Der Kommissar, 1982
- "Sometimes", by Angie Stone from The Art of Love & War, 2007
- "Sometimes", by Ariana Grande from Dangerous Woman, 2016
- "Sometimes", by Badfinger from Straight Up, 1971
- "Sometimes", by Bessie Jones, 1960
- "Sometimes", by Blind Melon from For My Friends, 2008
- "Sometimes", by Blink-182 from Buddha, 1994
- "Sometimes", by Candlebox from Happy Pills, 1998
- "Sometimes", by the Carpenters from Carpenters, 1971
- "Sometimes", by Crush from Crush on You, 2014
- "Sometimes", by DallasK, 2019
- "Sometimes", by Depeche Mode from Black Celebration, 1986
- "Sometimes", by Donna Williams, 2000
- "Sometimes", by Earshot from The Silver Lining, 2008
- "Sometimes", by Firehose from If'n, 1987
- "Sometimes", by Garbage from Strange Little Birds, 2016
- "Sometimes", by Gerry Cinnamon from Erratic Cinematic, 2017
- "Sometimes", by Gucci Mane from Trap Back, 2012
- "Sometimes", by H.E.R., 2020
- "Sometimes", by Hanson from MMMBop, 1996
- "Sometimes", by Hooverphonic from Hooverphonic Presents Jackie Cane, 2002
- "Sometimes", by James from Laid, 1993
- "Sometimes", by K. Michelle from Rebellious Soul, 2013
- "Sometimes", by Kat Graham, 2017
- "Sometimes", by Les Rythmes Digitales from Darkdancer, 1999
- "Sometimes", by Lo'99 featuring Owl Eyes, 2019
- "Sometimes", by Love Battery from Dayglo, 1992
- "Sometimes", by Matt Brouwer from Where's Our Revolution, 2009
- "Sometimes", by Michael Franti & Spearhead from Stay Human, 2001
- "Sometimes", by My Bloody Valentine from Loveless, 1991
- "Sometimes", by Natalie Imbruglia from Left of the Middle, 1997
- "Sometimes", by Neiked, 2019
- "Sometimes", by No Doubt from No Doubt, 1992
- "Sometimes", by Orchestral Manoeuvres in the Dark from History of Modern, 2010
- "Sometimes", by Papa Roach from Getting Away with Murder, 2004
- "Sometimes", by Pearl Jam from No Code, 1996
- "Sometimes", by Punch, 2019
- "Sometimes", by Punch Brothers from Punch, 2008
- "Sometimes", by Reamonn from Wish, 2006
- "Sometimes", by Reneé Rapp from Bite Me, 2025
- "Sometimes", by Ringo Starr from Vertical Man, 1998
- "Sometimes", by Sound of Guns, 2012
- "Sometimes", by Sunny Day Real Estate from Diary, 1994
- "Sometimes...", by Tyler, the Creator from Flower Boy, 2017
- "Sometimes (Dr. Hirsch)", by Yello from Stella, 1985

== Other uses ==
- Sometimes (film), a 2018 Indian film
- Kabhi Kabhie, or Sometimes, a 1976 Indian film by Yash Chopra
- "Sometimes" (This Is Us), a television episode
- "Sometimes", a poem by Sheenagh Pugh

== See also ==
- Sometime (disambiguation)
