= Head to Toe =

Head to Toe may refer to:

- Head to Toe (EP), a 1994 EP by the Breeders
- "Head to Toe" (Lisa Lisa and Cult Jam song), 1987
- "Head to Toe" (Bill Anderson song), 1977
