= Sometime =

Sometime may refer to:

== Songs ==
- "Sometime" (Gene Thomas song), 1961
- "Sometime" (Glenn Miller song), 1939
- "Sometime", by DIIV from Oshin, 2012
- "Sometime", by Geri Halliwell from Schizophonic, 1999
- "Sometime", by James Brown from Hell, 1974
- "Sometime", by King's X from Ear Candy, 1996
- "Sometime", by Mavis Staples from We Get By, 2019
- "Sometime", written by Gus Kahn and Ted Fio Rito, 1925

== Other uses ==
- Sometime (musical), a 1918 Broadway musical
- Sometime, a Thoroughbred racehorse, winner of the 1963 Caulfield Cup in Australia

== See also ==
- Sometimes (disambiguation)
