= This Is a Love Song =

Single by Bill Anderson

from the album Ladies Choice
- B-side: "Remembering the Good"
- Released: February 1979
- Recorded: September 1978
- Studio: Bradley's Barn, Mount Juliet, Tennessee
- Genre: Country; Countrypolitan
- Length: 3:45
- Label: MCA
- Songwriter: Jim Weatherly
- Producer: Buddy Killen

Bill Anderson singles chronology
"Double S" (1978)	"This Is a Love Song" (1979)	"The Dream Never Dies" (1979)

"This Is a Love Song" is a song written by Jim Weatherly. It was first recorded by American country singer-songwriter Bill Anderson. It was released as a single in 1979 via MCA Records and became a major hit the same year.

== Background and release ==
"This Is a Love Song" was recorded in September 1978 at Bradley's Barn, located in Mount Juliet, Tennessee. The session was produced by Buddy Killen, who recently became Anderson's producer after many years of working with Owen Bradley. Killen would continue producing Anderson until his departure from MCA Records. Six additional sides were cut at the same studio session. This included his major hit "I Can't Wait Any Longer".

"This Is a Love Song" was released as a single by MCA Records in February 1979. The song spent 13 weeks on the Billboard Hot Country Singles before reaching number 20 in April 1979. It was Anderson's final major hit as a recording artist in his career. His final top 40 single would be released the following year. In Canada, the single reached number 15 on the RPM Country Songs chart in 1979. It was first released on his 1979 studio album, Ladies Choice.

== Track listings ==
7" vinyl single

- "This Is a Love Song" – 3:45
- "Remembering the Good" – 4:20

== Chart performance ==
Chart (1979)	Peak position
Canada Country Songs (RPM)	15
US Hot Country Songs (Billboard)	20
