= Bill (Bill Anderson album) =

Studio album by Bill Anderson
- Released: July 1973
- Recorded: April 1973
- Studios: Bradley's Barn, Mt. Juliet, Tennessee
- Genres: Country; Nashville Sound
- Label: MCA
- Producer: Owen Bradley

Bill Anderson chronology
Don't She Look Good (1972)	Bill (1973)	"Whispering" Bill Anderson (1974)

Singles from Bill
- 1. "If You Can Live with It (I Can Live Without It)" Released: January 1973; 2. "The Corner of My Life" Released: June 1973; 3. "World of Make Believe" Released: November 1973

Bill is a studio album by American country singer-songwriter Bill Anderson. It was released in July 1973 on MCA Records and was produced by Owen Bradley. It was Anderson's first studio album to be released on the MCA label after Decca Records merged with the label. It was also his twenty first studio recording to be released and only album project to be issued in 1973. The album included three singles, two of which became number one hits in either the United States and Canada. The album itself also would reach peak positions on national publication charts.

== Background and content ==
Bill was recorded in April 1973 in Mount Juliet, Tennessee. The sessions were held specifically at Bradley's Barn, a studio owned by the album's producer, Owen Bradley. Anderson and Bradley had been collaborating on albums since Anderson's debut record was released in 1963. This would be his twenty first album all together. The record consisted of 11 tracks. Three of its tracks were written by Anderson. This included the single, "If You Can Live with It (I Can Live Without It)". Some of the album tracks were covers of songs previously recorded by other performers. Among these covers was "(Altogether Now) Let's Fall Apart", which was first made a hit single by Ronnie Milsap. The record also featured a cover of the pop track "Have You Seen Her". This song was first recorded by The Chi-Lites.

== Release and reception ==
Professional ratings
Review scores
Source	Rating
Allmusic	2.5/5 stars

Bill was released in July 1973 on MCA Records. It was Anderson's first album to be released under MCA after his previous label (Decca) merged with the company. It was issued originally as a vinyl LP and as a cassette. Both formats featured tracks on both side of the record. Bill peaked at number 15 on the Billboard Top Country Albums chart in September 1973 after spending 14 weeks on the chart. The album also included three singles released to radio in 1973. The first was "If You Can Live With It (I Can Live Without It)" in January 1973. It peaked at number two on the Billboard Hot Country Singles chart while also reaching number two on the RPM Country Singles chart in Canada.

In June 1973, "The Corner of My Life" was issued as the second single. Like its previous single, "The Corner of My Life" peaked at number two on the Billboard country chart. Additionally, the single reached the top spot of the RPM country singles chart. The third and final single release came with "World of Make Believe" in November 1973. It became Anderson's first number one hit in the United States since 1969 when it reached the position in February 1974. The song also topped the Canadian country chart around the same time. In years following its release, Bill received a rating of 2.5 stars from Allmusic.

== Track listing ==
Side one (Vinyl and cassette versions)
No.	Title	Writer(s)	Length
1.	"If You Can Live with It (I Can Live Without It)"	Bill Anderson	2:43
2.	"Look How I Love You"	James Gilreath	2:39
3.	"Home and Things"	Anderson	2:45
4.	"Baby's Blue Again"	Jim Weatherly	3:56
5.	"Number One"	Jerry Chesnut	1:52
6.	"(All Together Now) Let's Fall Apart"	Johnny Koonse	2:20

Side two (Vinyl and cassette versions)
No.	Title	Writer(s)	Length
1.	"The Corner of My Life"	Anderson	3:35
2.	"Gonna Shine It on Again"	Weatherly	3:04
3.	"World of Make Believe"	Mario Carpenter; Pee Wee Maddux; Peter McCord	2:38
4.	"I Can't Mend It"	Ray Griff	2:14
5.	"Have You Seen Her"	Barbara Acklin; Eugene Record	2:08

== Personnel ==
All credits are adapted from the liner notes of Bill.

- Bill Anderson – lead vocals
- Hal Bauksbaum – photography
- Owen Bradley – record producer

== Chart performance ==
Chart (1973)	Peak position
US Top Country Albums (Billboard)	15

== Release history ==
Region	Date	Format	Label	Ref.
Canada	July 1973	Vinyl	MCA	
United States	July 1973	Vinyl	MCA	
United States	July 1973	Cassette	MCA	
