= Thomm Jutz =

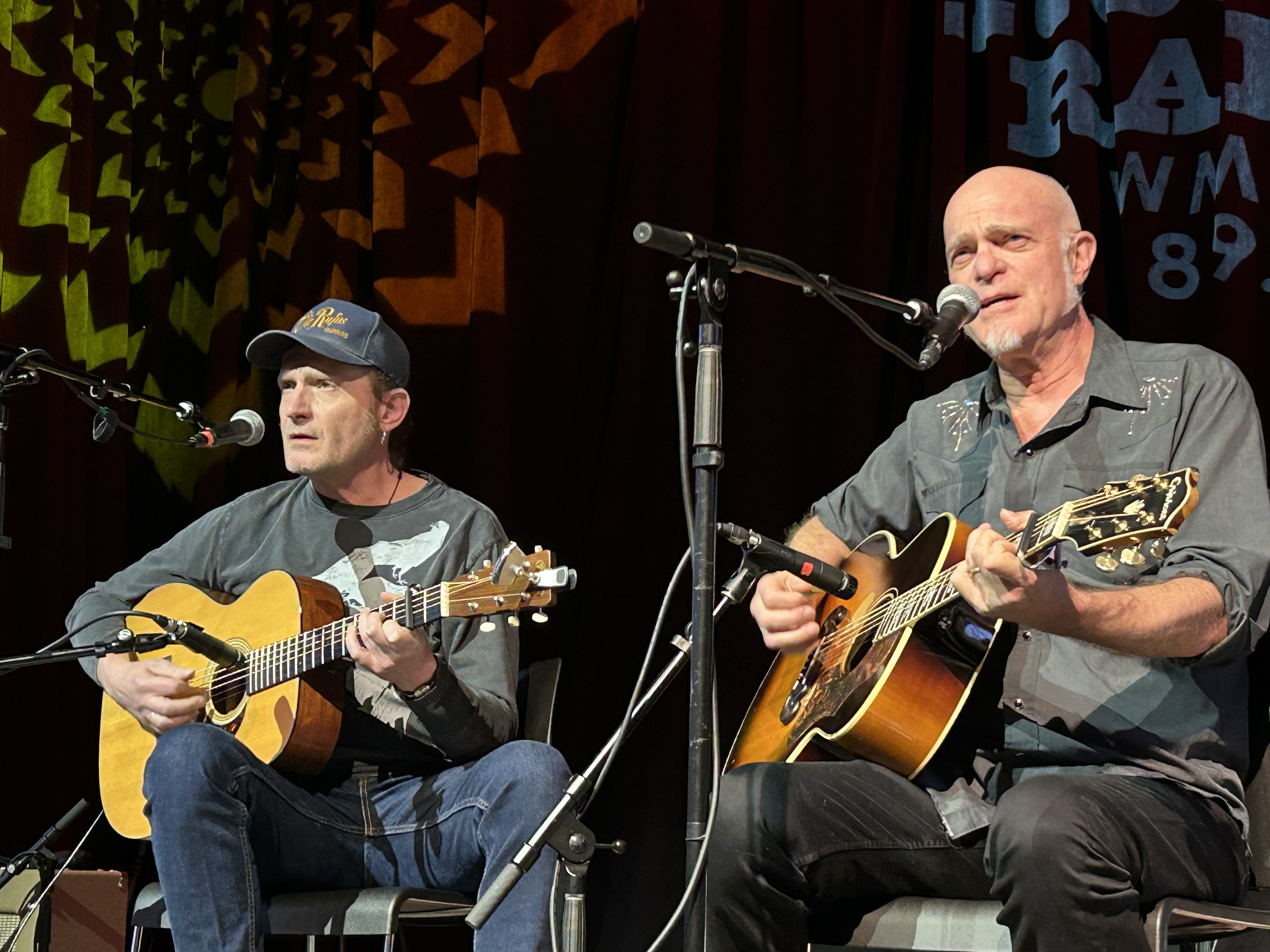
- Jutz (left) performing with Eric Brace for WMOT Roots Radio, Apr. 2026

Background information
- Born: December 27, 1969 (age 56); Neusatz, Germany
- Genres: Country, bluegrass, folk
- Occupations: Musician, songwriter, producer
- Instruments: Guitar
- Years active: 1980s–present
- Labels: Mountain Home, Topic Records
- Website: thommjutz.com

Thomm Jutz (born December 27, 1969) is a German-born American singer, songwriter, producer and guitarist based in Nashville, Tennessee.

He has worked with folk singer Nanci Griffith (as a member of her Blue Moon Orchestra), Eric Brace & Peter Cooper, Mary Gauthier, Mac Wiseman, Bobby Bare, Connie Smith, Marty Stuart, David Olney, Otis Gibbs, Kim Richey, Bill Anderson, Amy Speace, Milan Miller and Marc Marshall.

His songs have been recorded by Nanci Griffith, John Prine, Kim Richey, Junior Sisk, Kenny and Amanda Smith, Balsam Range, Buddy Melton, Milan Miller and Terry Baucom.

Jutz co-wrote the top two singles of 2016 listed on the Bluegrass Today Airplay chart.

Jutz signed with Mountain Home Music Company in 2019. New albums "To Live in Two Worlds – Vol 1 & 2" were released in 2020. Singles "Mill Town Blues", "I Long to Hear Them Testify", "Hartford's Bend" and "Jimmie Rodgers Rode a Train" were released in 2019. He also signed as a writer with Asheville Music Publishing in 2018. "To Live In Two Worlds, Vol 1" was nominated for a 2021 Grammy Award in the Bluegrass category.

Jutz is a current lecturer of songwriting at Belmont University and is working on a master’s degree in Appalachian Studies at East Tennessee State University, writing his thesis on Grammy-winner Norman Blake. Additional writings and essays have been published in American Songwriter and the IBMA Songwriter’s Newsletter. Jutz is featured in the Country Music Hall of Fame’s American Currents exhibit, slated to run 2022-2023.

== Early life ==
Jutz originates from Neusatz, Buehl, Baden-Württemberg in the Black Forest of Germany and started playing music at the age of six, initially learning piano and flute.

In 1981 at age 11 he saw country artist Bobby Bare on a German television program performing Detroit City and, inspired by the way Bare stood and held his guitar, took up the guitar and developed an interest in Country, Bluegrass and Folk Music.

Jutz won several nationwide competitions as a teenager before studying classical guitar at the State University of Music and Performing Arts Stuttgart under professor Dr. Mario Sicca. Jutz played throughout Central Europe with Blues and Rock Bands, and began studying songwriting and studio engineering.

== Career ==
In 2003, Jutz was granted a Diversity Immigrant Visa into the USA and moved his base to Nashville, where he immediately found favor and started touring worldwide with David Olney, Mary Gauthier and Nanci Griffith.

Jutz then set up as owner and operator of TJ Tunes, the studio he created for writers, players and artists from different places and genres to come together in a relaxed, rural setting, to write and record. He has produced over 70 albums to date.

=== The 1861 Project ===
Between 2011 and 2014, Jutz produced and wrote songs for the three volumes of The 1861 Project, a collection of new songs inspired by the people who fought and lived through the American Civil War.

Artists featured on these albums include Marty Stuart, John Anderson, Jerry Douglas, Maura O'Connell, Connie Smith, Chris Jones, Sierra Hull, Bobby Bare, Jason Ringenberg, Kim Richey and Hannah & Caroline Melby. The series received praise from historians, critics, music lovers and Civil War enthusiasts.

=== "I Sang the Song" ===
During 2016, Jutz, together with Peter Cooper and 91-year-old country music legend Mac Wiseman, spent nine Sunday afternoons at Wiseman's house writing material based on the stories Wiseman would tell of his life.

In January 2017, Mountain Fever Records released these songs on the "I Sang The Song" album, produced by Jutz and Cooper. Friends and admirers performing on the album include John Prine, Alison Krauss, Jim Lauderdale, Shawn Camp, Sierra Hull, Justin Moses, Andrea Zonn and Mark Fain.

=== "Nothing But Green Willow" ===
In 2022, Jutz collaborated with English singer guitarist Martin Simpson to shed light on Appalachian folk songs collected by Cecil Sharp, sung by Jane Gentry and Mary Sands in Madison County, North Carolina. The two women who nobody ever heard sing, unknowingly changed the course of folk music history.

The resulting album, “Nothing But Green Willow”, features, from the UK/Ireland, Cara Dillon, Fay Hield, Seth Lakeman, Angeline Morrison and Emily Portman and from the U.S. Dale Ann Bradley, Sierra Hull, Justin Moses, Tim O’Brien, Tammy Rogers and Odessa Settles. It was released on September 29, 2023 on Topic Records. Ted Olson's liner notes were nominated for Liner Notes of the Year in the IBMA 2024 industry awards.

== Discography ==
=== Solo albums ===
- To Live in Two Worlds, Vol 1 & 2 (Mountain Home, 2020)
- Crazy If You Let It (Mountain Fever, 2017)
- Volunteer Trail (Self released, 2016)
- Work (Self released, 2010)

=== Collaborative albums ===
- Tim Stafford & Thomm Jutz: Wall Dogs (2024)
- Eric Brace & Thomm Jutz: Simple Motion (Red Beet Records, 2023)
- Martin Simpson & Thomm Jutz: Nothing But Green Willow: The Songs Of Mary Sands And Jane Gentry (Topic Records, 2023)
- Tim Stafford & Thomm Jutz: Lost Voices (Mountain Fever Records, 2022)
- Tammy Rogers & Thomm Jutz: Surely Will Be Singing (Mountain Fever Records, 2021)
- Eric Brace, Peter Cooper & Thomm Jutz: Riverland (Red Beet Records, 2018)
- Eric Brace, Peter Cooper & Thomm Jutz: Profiles in Courage, Frailty, and Discomfort (Red Beet Records, 2017)
- Jefferson Ross & Thomm Jutz: Stable Suite (2015)
- Thomm Jutz & Craig Market: Nowhere To Hide (2015)
- Billy Goodman & Thomm Jutz: Ghost Town (2011)

=== As producer ===
- Bill Anderson, featuring Bobby Bare, Jimmy Fortune, Vince Gill & Willie Nelson: The Country I Grew Up With (single, MCA Nashville) (co-produced with Bill Anderson)
- Bill Anderson & Dolly Parton: Someday It’ll All Make Sense (single, MCA Nashville) (co-produced with Bill Anderson)
- Bill Anderson: The Hits Re-Imagined (TWI) (co-produced with Bill Anderson)
- Nanci Griffith: The Loving Kind (Rounder Records) (co-produced with Pat McInerney)
- Mac Wiseman: I Sang The Song (co-produced with Peter Cooper)
- Mac Wiseman: Songs From My Mother's Hand (co-produced with Peter Cooper)
- Various Artists: The 1861 Project, Vols. 1-3
- Sid Griffin: The Trick Is To Breathe
- Steve Young: Songlines Revisited Volume One
- Eric Brace & Peter Cooper : C&O Canal
- Richard Dobson: From A Distant Shore
- Otis Gibbs: Harder Than Hammered Hell
- Todd Snider : Cheatham Street Warehouse (co-produced with Peter Cooper)
- Jason Ringenberg: Christmas on the Farm with Farmer Jason (co-produced with Peter Cooper)
- Marc Marshall: Nimm Dir Zeit (co-produced with Frank Lauber)

=== Other appearances ===
- Mary Gauthier: Mercy Now / Season Of Mercy EP, Limited Edition (Jutz plays on 3 tracks on 2nd disc)
- Jon Weisberger: I've Been Mostly Awake (Jutz and Kim Richey are featured on the track Everything is Broken)
- Dan Evans: Au Vieux Moulin with guest Stephen Seifert (mountain dulcimer) (Jutz is engineer on two tracks)

== Video games ==
Jutz's song Burning the Midnight Oil, co-written with Peter Cronin, appears on Life Is Strange: Before the Storm.

== Awards and recognition ==
- IBMA 2023 International Bluegrass Music Awards – nomination for Songwriter of the Year
- IBMA 2022 International Bluegrass Music Awards – nomination for Song of the Year: Riding The Chief
- IBMA 2021 International Bluegrass Music Awards – Winner, Songwriter of the Year
- Grammy Awards 2021 – nomination in Bluegrass category for To Live in Two Worlds, Vol. 1
- IBMA 2019 International Bluegrass Music Awards – nomination for Songwriter of the Year
- IBMA 2018 International Bluegrass Music Awards – nomination for Songwriter of the Year
- IBMA 2017 International Bluegrass Music Awards – 4 nominations (as writer and producer in Song of the Year category, and as artist and producer in Recorded Event of the Year category)
- SESAC 2013 Nashville Music Awards for contributions to the album Thorn In My Heart recorded by Kim Richey
- SESAC 2009 Americana Performance Activity Award (with Charley Stefl) for contribution to the album The Loving Kind recorded by Nanci Griffith
- Member of IBMA Leadership Bluegrass class of 2015
- Member of Nashville's Leadership Music class of 2013
