= That's What Made Me Love You =

Single by Bill Anderson and Mary Lou Turner

from the album Sometimes
- B-side: "Can We Still Be Friends"
- Released: April 1976
- Recorded: September 1975
- Studio: Bradley's Barn, Mount Juliet, Tennessee
- Genre: Country; Countrypolitan
- Length: 2:49
- Label: MCA
- Songwriter: Lawrence Shoberg
- Producer: Owen Bradley

Bill Anderson singles chronology
"Sometimes" (1976)	"That's What Made Me Love You" (1976)	"Peanuts and Diamonds" (1976)

Mary Lou Turner singles chronology
"Sometimes" (1976)	"That's What Made Me Love You" (1976)	"It's Different With You" (1976)

"That's What Made Me Love You" is a song written by Lawrence Shoberg. It was first recorded as a duet by American country artists Bill Anderson and Mary Lou Turner. It was released as a single in 1976 via MCA Records and became a major hit the same year.

== Background and release ==
"That's What Made Me Love" was recorded in September 1975 at Bradley's Barn studio in Mount Juliet, Tennessee. The session was produced by the studio's owner, Owen Bradley. It would be one of Bradley's final sessions producing Anderson, whom he had been collaborating with since the 1950s.

"That's What Made Me Love You" was released as a single by MCA Records in February 1979. The song spent 12 weeks on the Billboard Hot Country Singles before reaching number seven in May 1976. It was the pair's second top ten hit together and second to be spawned off the same studio album. In Canada, the single reached number two on the RPM Country Songs chart in 1976. It was first released on their 1976 studio album, Sometimes.

== Track listings ==
7" vinyl single

- "That's What Made Me Love You" – 2:48
- "Can We Still Be Friends" – 2:49

== Chart performance ==
Chart (1976)	Peak position
Canada Country Songs (RPM)	2
US Hot Country Songs (Billboard)	7
