= Liars One, Believers Zero =

Single by Bill Anderson

from the album Peanuts and Diamonds and Other Jewels
- B-side: "Let Me Whisper Darling One More Time"
- Released: November 1976
- Recorded: April 22, 1976
- Studio: Bradley's Barn, Mount Juliet, Tennessee
- Genre: Country; Countrypolitan
- Length: 2:39
- Label: MCA
- Songwriter: Glenn Martin
- Producer: Buddy Killen

Bill Anderson singles chronology
"Peanuts and Diamonds" (1976)	"Liars One, Believers Zero" (1976)	"Head to Toe" (1976)

"Liars One, Believers Zero" is a song written by Glenn Martin. It was first recorded by American country singer-songwriter Bill Anderson. It was released as a single in 1976 via MCA Records and became a major hit the following year.

== Background and release ==
"Liars One, Believers Zero" was recorded on April 22, 1976 at Bradley's Barn, located in Mount Juliet, Tennessee. The session was produced by Buddy Killen, who had recently become Anderson's producer after many years of working with Owen Bradley. Killen would continue producing Anderson until his departure from MCA Records. Three additional tracks were recorded at the same studio session, including his major hit "Peanuts and Diamonds.

"Liars One, Believers Zero" was released as a single by MCA Records in November 1976. The song spent 14 weeks on the Billboard Hot Country Singles before reaching number six in February 1977. In Canada, the single reached number five on the RPM Country Songs chart in 1977. It was first released on his 1976 studio album, Peanuts and Diamonds and Other Jewels.

== Track listings ==
7" vinyl single

- "Liars One, Believers Zero" – 2:39
- "Let Me Whisper Darling One More Time" – 2:56

== Chart performance ==
Chart (1976–1977)	Peak position
Canada Country Songs (RPM)	5
US Hot Country Songs (Billboard)	6
