= Every Time I Turn the Radio On =

Country song by Bill Anderson

Single by Bill Anderson

from the album Every Time I Turn the Radio On/Talk to Me Ohio
- B-side: "You Are My Story (You Are My Song)"
- Released: September 1974
- Recorded: July 26, 1974
- Studio: RCA Victor (Nashville, Tennessee)
- Genre: Country; Countrypolitan
- Length: 2:11
- Label: MCA
- Songwriter: Bill Anderson
- Producer: Owen Bradley

Bill Anderson singles chronology
"Can I Come Home to You" (1974)	"Every Time I Turn the Radio On" (1974)	"I Still Feel the Same About You" (1975)

"Every Time I Turn the Radio On" is a song written and recorded by American country singer-songwriter Bill Anderson. It was released as a single in 1974 via MCA Records and became a major hit the same year.

== Background and release ==
"Every Time I Turn the Radio On" was recorded on July 26, 1974, at the RCA Studio A, located in Nashville, Tennessee. These were Anderson's first formal sessions at the RCA Studio. The sessions were produced by Owen Bradley, who would serve as Anderson's producer through most of years with MCA Records. An additional track was recorded at the same studio session: "Gonna Find Me a Bluebird."

"Every Time I Turn the Radio On" was released as a single by MCA Records in September 1974. The song spent 13 weeks on the Billboard Hot Country Singles before reaching number seven in December 1974. In Canada, the single became an even larger hit. It reached number four on the RPM Country Songs chart in 1974 in Canada. It was released on his 1975 studio album, Every Time I Turn the Radio On/Talk to Me Ohio.

== Track listings ==
7" vinyl single

- "Every Time I Turn the Radio On" – 2:11
- "You Are My Story (You Are My Song)" – 2:59

== Chart performance ==
Chart (1974)	Peak position
Canada Country Songs (RPM)	4
US Hot Country Songs (Billboard)	7
