= The Hits Re-Imagined =

Studio album (re-recording) by Bill Anderson
- Released: July 24, 2020
- Genres: Country; traditional country
- Label: TWI
- Producers: Bill Anderson; Thomm Jutz

Bill Anderson chronology
Anderson (2018)	The Hits Re-Imagined (2020)

The Hits Re-Imagined is a studio album by American country singer-songwriter Bill Anderson. It was released on July 24, 2020 through TWI Records. It was co-produced by Anderson and Thomm Jutz. His 45th studio recording in his career, The Hits features a re-working of his former hits as well as compositions that had been hits for other country artists.

== Background and content ==
In preparing The Hits Re-Imagined, Anderson chose material from both his early years as well as more recent years. In an interview with Rolling Stone his explained his choices behind the decision-making process: "I wanted to go to both ends of the spectrum, going all the way back to my earliest days and then coming up to some of the current things with “Whiskey Lullaby,” “Give It Away,” “Which Bridge to Cross.” I guess I just kind of picked off of both ends of the bush." Anderson had also been working on an audiobook, which is where the album's instrumental tracks stemmed from. "We started putting interesting snippets underneath the audiobook,” he continued, “and when we got through with that, we decided to just make full instrumentals out of these things," Anderson said in 2020.

Ten songs were chosen for the project, along with alternate versions of the first ten tracks, totaling out to 20 tracks altogether. The alternate songs are instrumentals of the first ten recordings on the album. On the album, Anderson revisits some his biggest hits from earlier in his career. The tracks were re-recorded for the album. This includes songs such as "Still," "Bright Lights and Country Music" and "The Tip of My Fingers." These songs were also composed by Anderson. Other songs chosen for the project were recorded by other artists in recent years. Tracks such as "I'll Wait for You" was first made a hit by Joe Nichols. "Give It Away" was a number one hit for George Strait. These songs include new musical stylings as well. "Give It Away" includes a bluegrass instrumentation.

== Release and reception ==
Professional ratings
Review scores
Source	Rating
American Songwriter	Favorable
Billboard	Favorable
Music Row	Favorable

The Hits Re-Imagined was officially released on July 24, 2020. It was Anderson's 45th studio album and 73rd album in his career, overall. The album was made available for pre-ordering in the weeks preceding its intended release. In early July 2020, "Give It Away" was released as a digital download in promotion for the album's release.

The Hits Re-Imagined was reviewed favorably by Billboard following its release. "At 82, Anderson brings a gravitas to the heavier songs and a lightheartedness to tunes like "Po Folks" with a low-key production that keeps the focus squarely on Anderson and his delivery. Just as it should be," writers commented. Rick Moore of American Songwriter also praised the album. He called the combination of vocal and instrumental tracks "unusual," but later explained his appreciation for the project's diversity. In addition, Lorie Hollabaugh of Music Row stated that Anderson "breathes new life" into the newer versions of the tracks. Hollabaugh also called the set of material chosen to be "iconic."

== Track listing ==
All tracks written by Bill Anderson, with additional writers noted.

The Hits Re-Imagined (digital version)
No.	Title	Writer(s)	Length
1.	"Bright Lights and Country Music"	Jimmy Gately	2:47
2.	"Whiskey Lullaby"	Jon Randall	4:08
3.	"Po' Folks"		3:06
4.	"I'll Wait for You"	Harley Allen	3:46
5.	"City Lights"		3:06
6.	"Still"		3:21
7.	"Give It Away"	Buddy Cannon; Jamey Johnson	3:19
8.	"The Tip of My Fingers"		3:49
9.	"A Lot of Things Different"	Dean Dillon	4:32
10.	"Which Bridge to Cross (Which Bridge to Burn)"	Vince Gill	3:53

Bonus tracks: Instrumental versions
No.	Title	Writer(s)	Length
11.	"Bright Lights and Country Music" (instrumental)	Gately	2:47
12.	"Whiskey Lullaby" (instrumental)	Randall	4:08
13.	"Po' Folks" (instrumental)		3:06
14.	"I'll Wait for You" (instrumental)	Allen	3:46
15.	"City Lights" (instrumental)		3:06
16.	"Still" (instrumental)		3:21
17.	"Give It Away" (instrumental)	Cannon; Johnson	3:19
18.	"The Tip of My Fingers" (instrumental)		3:49
19.	"A Lot of Things Different" (instrumental)	Dillon	4:32
20.	"Which Bridge to Cross (Which Bridge to Burn)" (instrumental)	Gill	3:53

== Personnel ==
- Bill Anderson – lead vocals, producer
- Thomm Jutz – producer

== Release history ==
Region	Date	Format	Label	Ref.
United States	July 24, 2020	Digital download	TWI Records	
United States	July 24, 2020	Compact disc	TWI Records	
