= Make Mine Night Time =

Single by Bill Anderson

from the album Nashville Mirrors
- B-side: "The Old Me and You"
- Released: April 1980
- Genre: Country; Countrypolitan
- Length: 3:09
- Label: MCA
- Songwriters: Mike Kosser; Curly Putman
- Producer: Buddy Killen

Bill Anderson singles chronology
"More Than a Bedroom Thing" (1979)	"Make Mine Night Time" (1980)	"Rock 'n' Roll to Rock of Ages" (1980)

"Make Mine Night Time" is a song written by Mike Kosser and Curly Putman. It was first recorded by American country singer-songwriter Bill Anderson. It was released as a single in 1980 via MCA Records and became top 40 hit single.

== Background and release ==
"Make Mine Night Time" was recorded in September 1979 in Nashville, Tennessee. The session was produced by Buddy Killen, who recently became Anderson's producer after many years of working with Owen Bradley. Killen would continue producing Anderson until his departure from MCA Records. Eight additional tracks were cut at the same session. These tracks appeared on Anderson's 1980 album release.

"Make Mine Night Time" was released as a single by MCA Records in April 1979. The song spent nine weeks on the Billboard Hot Country Singles before reaching number 35 in May 1979. It was Anderson's final single to peak in the Top 40 on the country chart. However, he would continue to have charting singles through the 1990s. It was first released on his 1980 studio album, Nashville Mirrors. This was the final album release for Anderson on MCA Records.

== Track listings ==
7" vinyl single

- "Make Mine Night Time" – 3:09
- "The Old Me and You" – 2:54

== Chart performance ==
Chart (1980)	Peak position
US Hot Country Songs (Billboard)	35
