= Red Beet Records =

Record label in Nashville, Tennessee, United States

- Founded: 2005
- Founder: Eric Brace
- Distributor: Proper Distribution
- Genre: Americana, folk, bluegrass
- Country of origin: U.S.
- Location: Nashville, Tennessee
- Official website: www.redbeetrecords.com

Red Beet Records is an independent record label based in Nashville, Tennessee.

== History ==
In 2003, label founder Eric Brace and his band Last Train Home moved to East Nashville from the Washington, D.C. area. Brace had been a journalist at The Washington Post, and had run the Top Records label.

Brace and Mary Ann Werner launched the Red Beet label in 2005, and they were soon joined by close friend Peter Cooper, musician, composer, and music writer for The Tennessean.

== Compilations and collaborations ==
While Red Beet Records releases recordings by individual artists, one of their strengths has been compilations and collaborations by multiple artists.

=== The Other Side: Music From East Nashville ===
Red Beet Records' initial release was the compilation The Other Side: Music From East Nashville to showcase local musicians such as Elizabeth Cook, Todd Snider, Chely Wright, Jon Byrd, Garrison Starr, and Thad Cockrell. Red Beet subsequently followed up with Yuletide from The Other Side: More Music from East Nashville in 2007, and More Music From The Other Side Vol.3.

=== I Love: Tom T. Hall's Songs of Fox Hollow ===
Red Beet's 2011 compilation album I Love: Tom T. Hall's Songs of Fox Hollow contains renditions of children's music composed by Tom T. Hall. The album was nominated for a Grammy Award. Contributors included Patty Griffin, Duane Eddy, Bobby Bare, and Buddy Miller.

=== The Skylighters ===
In 2006, Red Beet Records released The Skylighters, a bluegrass supergroup featuring Brace (guitar), Mike Auldridge (resonator guitar), Jimmy Gaudreau (mandolin), Jim Gray (bass), and Martin Lynds (percussion].

=== You Don't Have to Like Them Both ===
Besides running the Red Beet label, Bruce and Cooper toured frequently, and they released their first collaboration, You Don't Have to Like Them Both in 2009. The album included Brace/Cooper compositions, as well as songs by Jim Lauderdale, Todd Snider, Kris Kristofferson, and Paul Kennerly.

=== The Lloyd Green Album ===
Cooper collaborated with pedal steel guitarist Lloyd Green in 2010 on The Lloyd Green Album which showcases Green's virtuosity. Rodney Crowell, Kim Carnes, and Julie Lee provide harmonies.

=== Master Sessions ===
In 2010, Brace and Cooper released Master Sessions with Lloyd Green, Auldridge, Richard Bennett, Jen Gunderman, Pat McInerney, and Dave Roe, with Kenny Chesney and Jon Randall providing backing vocals.

=== Hangtown Dancehall ===
Released in 2014, Hangtown Dancehall: A Tale of the California Goldrush by Eric Brace & Karl Straub continued the story from the folk song "Sweet Betsy from Pike." It was both an album and a stage show, and featured Kelly Willis, Tim O'Brien, Darrell Scott, Jason Ringenberg, John Wesley Harding, and Andrea Zonn.

== Artists ==
Here is a partial list of artists who have released recordings on the Red Beet label.

- Eric Brace
- Jon Byrd
- Peter Cooper
- Fayssoux
- Kevin Gordon
- Last Train Home
- Jerry Lawson
- Jesse Lafser
- Tom Mason

== See also ==
- List of record labels
