= Double S =

Single by Bill Anderson

from the album Ladies Choice
- B-side: "Married Lady"
- Released: October 1978
- Recorded: August 1978
- Studio: Bradley's Barn, Mount Juliet, Tennessee
- Genre: Country; Countrypolitan
- Length: 6:22
- Label: MCA
- Songwriters: Bill Anderson; Buddy Killen
- Producer: Buddy Killen

Bill Anderson singles chronology
"I Can't Wait Any Longer" (1978)	"Double S" (1978)	"This Is a Love Song" (1979)

"Double S" is a song written by Bill Anderson and Buddy Killen. It was first recorded by its co-writer and American country singer-songwriter Bill Anderson. It was released as a single in 1978 via MCA Records and became top 40 hit single.

== Background and release ==
"Double S" was recorded in August 1978 at Bradley's Barn studio in Mount Juliet, Tennessee. The session was produced by Buddy Killen, who had recently become Anderson's producer after many years of working with Owen Bradley. Killen would continue producing Anderson until his departure from MCA Records. The studio session for the song included the recording of its B-side entitled, "Married Lady."

"Double S" was released as a single by MCA Records in October 1978. The song spent nine weeks on the Billboard Hot Country Singles before reaching number 30 in December 1979. It was among Anderson's final top 40 singles of his career. It was also his first single to not become a major hit since 1975. In Canada, the single only reached number 43 on the RPM Country Songs chart in 1978. It was first released on his 1979 studio album, Ladies Choice.

== Track listings ==
7" vinyl single

- "Double S" – 6:22
- "Married Lady" – 4:20

== Chart performance ==
Chart (1978)	Peak position
Canada Country Songs (RPM)	43
US Hot Country Songs (Billboard)	30
