= Life! (album) =

Studio album by Bill Anderson
- Released: March 4, 2014
- Genres: Country; contemporary country
- Length: 36:07
- Labels: Red River; TWI
- Producers: Bill Anderson; Rex Schnelle

Bill Anderson chronology
Songwriter (2010)	Life! (2014)	Anderson (2018)

Life! is a studio album by American country singer-songwriter Bill Anderson. It was released on March 4, 2014, via TWI Records. It was Anderson's 43rd studio release and contained a total of ten tracks. The project was Anderson's first studio album in four years and one of several he issued on his own record label.

== Background and content ==
Anderson co-produced the project with his longtime musical collaborator, Rex Schnelle. Life! was a collection of songs Anderson recorded based on the human experience. "Life! is a collection of songs that I feel are truly reflective of the human condition in virtually all of its intricacies, therefore the title. The songs are everything from humorous on the one end to staunchly patriotic on the other," he explained in a 2014 interview. A total of ten tracks are included on the project, all of which were co-written by Anderson. According to Anderson, the songs were a combination of story songs, comedy songs and patriotic songs.

The final album track, "Old Army Hat", was a story song based on a true story about his friend and his father. He explained the writing process with composing the song. "Walt Aldridge is my co-writer on the song and he saw the beauty and the value of the story and he really helped me organize my thoughts and get it all down on paper," he said. Other songs on the album were composed with other music artists, including Jamey Johnson, Brad Paisley and Jon Randall. Other artists such as Vince Gill and Willie Nelson are featured singing on the album.

== Release and reception ==
Professional ratings
Review scores
Source	Rating
Allmusic	Favorable

Life! was released on March 4, 2014, in conjunction with his own label (TWI) and Red River Entertainment. It was offered as a both a compact disc and a music download. The album did not chart on any publication at the time of its release, including Billboard. The track, "Old Army Hat", was later filmed with a music video in 2014. Life! received a positive reception from Steve Leggett of Allmusic. In his review, Leggett highlighted Anderson's songwriting ability and the numerous artists he wrote material for. He concluded with commenting on the album's release. "Anderson has recorded sparingly in the 21st century, so this set, Life!, comes as a welcome sight for his many fans," he stated.

== Track listing ==
Life! (2014)
No.	Title	Writer(s)	Length
1.	"Bubba Garcia's" (featuring Willie Nelson)	Bill Anderson; Buddy Cannon; Jamey Johnson	3:07
2.	"Rhinestone Grindstone" (featuring John Anderson)	Anderson; Thom Sheppard; Coley McCabe	3:46
3.	"She Could Ruin My Life"	Anderson; Vicky McGehee; Jon Randall	3:20
4.	"A Song Like This" (featuring Vince Gill)	Anderson; Brad Paisley	3:47
5.	"Blackberry Winter"	Anderson; Rob Crosby	3:25
6.	"Whisper" (featuring Joey + Rory)	Anderson; Rory Lee Feek	2:53
7.	"In Another Life"	Walt Aldridge; Anderson	3:14
8.	"Dreams Are Easy to Come By" (featuring Dailey & Vincent)	Anderson; Todd David Cerney	4:00
9.	"When You Love Me"	Anderson; Billy Kirsch	3:13
10.	"Old Army Hat/America the Beautiful" (featuring The Great American Choir)	Public domain	5:22
Total length:			36:07

== Personnel ==
All credits are adapted from the liner notes of Life! and Allmusic.

Musical personnel

- Bill Anderson – lead vocals
- John Anderson – featured artist
- Eddie Bayers – drums
- Gloria Ceravantes – background vocals
- Dailey & Vincent – featured artist
- Glen Duncan – fiddle
- Rick Florian – choir
- Vince Gill – featured artist
- The Great American Choir – featured artist
- Steven Herrman – trumpet
- Mike Johnson – dobro, steel guitar
- Brandon McGuinness – choir
- Willie Nelson – featured artist
- T. Justin Schneider – bass
- Rex Schnelle – acoustic guitar, banjo, choir, electric guitar, hammond b3, mandolin, piano
- Harry Stinson – drums

Technical personnel

- Bill Anderson – liner notes, producer
- Buddy Cannon – vocal producer
- Paul Cookson – percussion
- Josh D'Aubin – photography
- Dailey & Vincent – vocal producer
- Adam Engelhart – engineering
- Vince Gill – vocal producer
- Betty Hofer – publicity
- Nick Meinema – booking
- Jim Palmieri – assistant
- Kim Russell – design
- Rex Schnelle – arrangement, mixing, sampled strings, producer
- Lee Williard – design direction, management
- Hank Williams – mastering

== Release history ==
Region	Date	Format	Label	Ref.
United States	March 4, 2014	Compact disc; music download	TWI Records; Red River Entertainment	
