= Ladies Choice (Bill Anderson album) =

Studio album by Bill Anderson
- Released: 1979
- Recorded: September 1978
- Studios: Bradley's Barn, Mount Juliet, Tennessee
- Genres: Country; Countrypolitan
- Label: MCA
- Producer: Buddy Killen

Bill Anderson chronology
Love...& Other Sad Stories (1978)	Ladies Choice (1979)	Nashville Mirrors (1980)

Singles from Ladies Choice
- 1. "Double S" Released: October 1978; 2. "This Is a Love Song" Released: February 1979

Ladies Choice is a studio album by American country singer-songwriter Bill Anderson. It was released in 1979 on MCA Records and was produced by Buddy Killen. His 29th studio album, Ladies Choice, produced two singles that became charting singles on the Billboard country chart. It included a mix of songs composed by Anderson and other songwriters.

== Background and content ==
Ladies Choice was recorded in September 1978 at Bradley's Barn, a studio located in Mount Juliet, Tennessee. The sessions were produced by Buddy Killen. Anderson had been collaborating with Killen since 1976 on several studio recordings. The album was a collection of eleven tracks. Six songs on the record were composed by Anderson himself. This included the single "Double S", which was co-written with Buddy Killen. Also featured on the album is Anderson's major hit from 1978, "I Can't Wait Any Longer". The album was originally released through his 1978 studio album but was featured on Ladies Choice as well. Also included were several songs composed by others. Among these tracks was "Three Times a Lady", a song first recorded and made a hit by the Commodores. Also included is the track "Stay with Me", which was a hit for Dave & Sugar and later by Family Brown.

== Release and chart performance ==
Ladies Choice was released in 1979 on MCA Records, becoming Anderson's 29th studio album. It was issued in two formats upon its release. The album was released as a vinyl record, with five songs on each side. It was also issued as a cassette in a similar song format. Ladies Choice was Anderson's final studio effort to reach a peak position on the Billboard Top Country Albums chart. Spending a total of five weeks on the chart, it reached number 44 by March 1979. The album would produce two singles. The first was "Double S", which was issued in October 1978. After nine weeks on the Billboard Hot Country Singles chart, it only reached a peak position of 30. The song reached a similar position on the RPM Country chart in Canada, peaking at number 43. The second single, "This Is a Love Song", was released in February 1979. The single performed higher on the Billboard country chart, becoming a major hit after reaching the number 20 position. In similar fashion, the song reached the top 20 of the Canadian country chart, peaking at number 15.

== Tracklisting ==
Side one
No.	Title	Writer(s)	Length
1.	"Trust Me"	Bill Anderson	4:19
2.	"One More Sexy Lady"	Anderson	2:44
3.	"This Is a Love Song"	Jim Weatherly	3:45
4.	"Remembering the Good"	Anderson; Buddy Killen	4:20
5.	"Ladies Get Lonesome Too"	Peggy Forman	2:45
6.	"I Can't Wait Any Longer"	Anderson; Killen	3:32

Side two
No.	Title	Writer(s)	Length
1.	"Kiss You All Over"	Mike Chapman; Nicky Chinn	4:49
2.	"Double S"	Anderson; Killen	4:45
3.	"Married Lady"	Anderson	4:20
4.	"Stay with Me"	J.P. Pennington	2:48
5.	"Three Times a Lady"	Lionel Richie	4:43

== Personnel ==
All credits are adapted from the liner notes of Ladies Choice.

Musical and technical personnel

- Bill Anderson – lead vocals
- Buddy Killen – producer

== Chart performance ==
Chart (1979)	Peak position
US Top Country Albums (Billboard)	44

== Release history ==
Region	Date	Format	Label	Ref.
Canada	1979	Vinyl; cassette	MCA	
United Kingdom	1979	Vinyl; cassette	Bulldog	
United States	1979	Vinyl; cassette	MCA	
