= Don't She Look Good =

Studio album by Bill Anderson
- Released: November 1972
- Recorded: 1971–1972
- Studios: Bradley's Barn, Mount Juliet, Tennessee
- Genres: Country; Nashville Sound
- Label: Decca
- Producer: Owen Bradley

Bill Anderson chronology
Bill Anderson Sings for "All the Lonely Women in the World" (1972)	Don't She Look Good (1972)	Bill (1973)

Singles from Don't She Look Good
- 1. "Don't She Look Good" Released: August 1972

Don't She Look Good is a studio album by American country singer-songwriter Bill Anderson. It was released in November 1972 on Decca Records and was produced by Owen Bradley. The album was Anderson's twentieth studio recording to be issued. It was also his fourth studio album released in 1972. Two additional projects were collaborations with Jan Howard earlier in the year. The album's only single was the title track, which became a major hit on the country charts.

== Background and content ==
Don't She Look Good was recorded between 1971 and 1972 at Bradley's Barn studio in Mount Juliet, Tennessee, a studio where Anderson recorded many of his previous albums. Sessions were produced by the studio's owner and acclaimed producer, Owen Bradley. Like many of Anderson's previous albums, the project consisted of 11 tracks. Unlike any of his previous releases, Don't She Look Good did not include any songs composed entirely by Anderson himself. One song was a co-write with Michael Taylor. "Some of Nashville's best writers gave me such great material that I didn't need any of mine!" he recalled in the liner notes. Among some of the writers Anderson recorded songs by was Jerry Chesnut, who wrote the record's title track. Also included are songs by Ray Griff and Ben Peters. Peters wrote the track, "I Can't Believe That It's All Over", a song that became a major hit for Skeeter Davis.

== Release and reception ==
Don't She Look Good was released in November 1972 on Decca Records. It was one of four album releases by Anderson on the Decca label that year. Among his others was two studio efforts with country artist Jan Howard. A previous album release was a solo effort in May 1972. It would also be Anderson's final album to be released on the Decca label before the company switched to the MCA name. It was originally released as a vinyl LP record, with six songs on side one and five songs on side two. In February 1973, the album peaked at number ten on the Billboard country albums chart after spending 15 weeks on there. Its only single release was the title track, which was issued in August 1972. By November, the song reached number two on the Billboard Hot Country Singles chart after spending 16 weeks there. It ultimately became of Anderson's biggest hits as a recording artist.

== Track listing ==
Side one
No.	Title	Writer(s)	Length
1.	"Don't She Look Good"	Jerry Chesnut	2:07
2.	"This Land, the Lord and Me"	Chesnut	2:40
3.	"If Only You'd a Happened to Me (A Long Time Ago)"	Harlan Howard; Gene Myers	2:23
4.	"Calgary"	Anderson; Michael Taylor	2:25
5.	"Gotta Keep Moving"	Steve Karliski	2:17
6.	"I Can't Believe That It's All Over"	Ben Peters	2:30

Side two
No.	Title	Writer(s)	Length
1.	"Love's Not Love (Till You Give It Away)"	Glenn Martin; Ronnie Sessions	2:18
2.	"I'm Just Gone"	Buzz Rabin	2:35
3.	"Sugar in Your Coffee"	Ray Griff	2:22
4.	"Watching It Go"	Gene Thomas	2:45
5.	"Country Music in My Soul"	Bobby Bond	2:30

== Personnel ==
All credits are adapted from the liner notes of Don't She Look Good.

- Bill Anderson – lead vocals
- Hal Bauksbaum – photography
- Owen Bradley – record producer

== Chart performance ==
Chart (1972–1973)	Peak position
US Top Country Albums (Billboard)	10

== Release history ==
Region	Date	Format	Label	Ref.
United States	November 1972	Vinyl	Decca	
Germany	November 1972	Vinyl	MCA	
