= I Can't Believe That It's All Over =

Single by Skeeter Davis

from the album I Can't Believe That It's All Over
- B-side: "Try Jesus"
- Released: May 1973
- Recorded: March 9, 1973; Nashville, Tennessee, U.S.
- Genre: Country, Nashville Sound
- Label: RCA Victor
- Songwriter: Ben Peters
- Producer: Ronny Light

Skeeter Davis singles chronology
"A Hillbilly Song" (1972)	"I Can't Believe That It's All Over" (1973)	"Don't Forget to Remember" (1973)

"I Can't Believe That It's All Over" is a song written by Ben Peters and recorded and released as a single by American country artist, Skeeter Davis.

The song was recorded at the RCA Victor Studio in Nashville, Tennessee, United States on March 9, 1973. The session was produced by Ronny Light. The song was released as a single in May 1973, reaching the number twelve Billboard Magazine Hot Country Singles chart. It was Davis' first major hit in three years on the country chart. It would also be her final major hit. Additionally, the single reached number one on the Billboard Bubbling Under Hot 100 Singles Chart, her final entry on the pop chart, which had been preceded by a seven-year hiatus. Additionally, the single peaked at number eleven on the Canadian RPM Country Songs chart. It was issued onto Davis' studio album of the same name.

== Chart performance ==
Chart (1973)	Peak position
U.S. Billboard Hot Country Singles	12
U.S. Billboard Bubbling Under Hot 100 Singles	1
CAN RPM Country Songs	11
