= Thanks (song) =

Single by J. Vincent Edwards

from the album Thanks
- B-side: "Do It All Over Again"
- Released: November 1, 1969
- Label: CBS
- Songwriters: Bill Martin and Phil Coulter
- Producers: Bill Martin and Phil Coulter

J. Vincent Edwards singles chronology
"Run to the Sun" (1969)	"Thanks" (1969)	"Who are My Friends" (1970)

"Thanks"

Single by Bill Anderson

from the album Peanuts and Diamonds and Other Jewels
- B-side: "Why'd the Last Time Have to Be the Best"
- Released: August 1975
- Recorded: April 10, 1975
- Studio: Bradley's Barn, Mount Juliet, Tennessee
- Genre: Country; Countrypolitan
- Length: 2:26
- Label: MCA
- Songwriters: Bill Martin and Phil Coulter
- Producer: Owen Bradley

Bill Anderson singles chronology
"Country D.J." (1975)	"Thanks" (1975)	"Sometimes" (1975)

"Thanks" is a song written by Bill Martin and Phil Coulter and first recorded by J. Vincent Edwards in 1969. Edwards recording charted in the Netherlands. American country singer-songwriter Bill Anderson's version was released as a single in 1975 via MCA Records and became a major hit the same year.

Waylon Jennings released a version on his 1972 album Ladies Love Outlaws and Arrows on their 1976 album First Hit.

== Background and release ==
"Thanks" by Bill Anderson was recorded on April 10, 1975 at Bradley's Barn studio in Mount Juliet, Tennessee. The sessions were produced by the studio's owner, Owen Bradley, who would serve as Anderson's producer through most of years with MCA Records. The single's B-side was also cut at the same studio session: "Why'd the Last Time Have to Be the Best.".

"Thanks" was released as a single by MCA Records in August 1975. The song spent 11 weeks on the Billboard Hot Country Singles before reaching number 24 in October 1975. In Canada, the single reached number 19 on the RPM Country Songs chart in 1975. It was released on his 1976 studio album, Peanuts and Diamonds and Other Jewels.

== Track listings ==
7" vinyl single

- "Thanks" – 2:26
- "Why'd the Last Time Have to Be the Best" – 2:46

== Chart performance ==
Chart (1975)	Peak position
Canada Country Songs (RPM)	24
US Hot Country Songs (Billboard)	19
