= Peanuts and Diamonds =

Single by Bill Anderson

from the album Peanuts and Diamonds and Other Jewels
- B-side: "Your Love Blows Me Away"
- Released: August 1976
- Recorded: April 22, 1976
- Studio: Bradley's Barn, Mount Juliet, Tennessee
- Genre: Country; Countrypolitan
- Length: 3:10
- Label: MCA
- Songwriter: Bobby Braddock
- Producer: Buddy Killen

Bill Anderson singles chronology
"That's What Made Me Love You" (1976)	"Peanuts and Diamonds" (1976)	"Liars One, Believers Zero" (1976)

"Peanuts and Diamonds" is a song written by Bobby Braddock. It was first recorded by American country singer-songwriter Bill Anderson. It was released as a single in 1976 via MCA Records and became a major hit the same year.

== Background and release ==
"Peanuts and Diamonds" was recorded on April 22, 1976 at Bradley's Barn studio in Mount Juliet, Tennessee. The session was produced by Buddy Killen, who had recently become Anderson's producer after many years of working with Owen Bradley. Killen would continue producing Anderson until his departure from MCA Records. Three additional tracks were recorded at the same studio session, including his major hit "Liars One, Believers Zero.

"Peanuts and Diamonds" was released as a single by MCA Records in August 1976. The song spent 14 weeks on the Billboard Hot Country Singles before reaching number ten in October of that year. In Canada, the single reached number seven on the RPM Country Songs chart in 1975. It was released on his 1976 studio album, Peanuts and Diamonds and Other Jewels.

== Track listings ==
7" vinyl single

- "Peanuts and Diamonds" – 3:10
- "Your Love Blows Me Away" – 3:03

== Chart performance ==
Chart (1976)	Peak position
Canada Country Songs (RPM)	7
US Hot Country Songs (Billboard)	10
