= Country D.J. =

Single by Bill Anderson

from the album Every Time I Turn the Radio On/Talk to Me Ohio
- B-side: "We Made Love"
- Released: May 1975
- Genre: Country; Countrypolitan
- Length: 3:19
- Label: MCA
- Songwriter: Bill Anderson
- Producer: Owen Bradley

Bill Anderson singles chronology
"I Still Feel the Same About You" (1975)	"Country D.J." (1975)	"Thanks" (1975)

"Country D.J." is a song written and first recorded by American country singer-songwriter Bill Anderson. It was released as a single in 1975 via MCA Records and became top 40 hit single.

== Background and release ==
"Country D.J." was recorded on August 15, 1974 at the RCA Victor Studios, located in Nashville, Tennessee. The session was produced by Owen Bradley, Anderson's longtime producer on his record label. It was the only song recorded during this particular session

"Country D.J." was released as a single by MCA Records in May 1975. The song spent 11 weeks on the Billboard Hot Country Singles before reaching number 36 in June 1975. It was Anderson's first single to miss becoming a major hit since 1967's "Stranger on the Run." In Canada, the single reached the top 30, peaking at number 23 on the RPM Country Songs chart in 1975. It was first released on his 1975 studio album, Every Time I Turn the Radio On/Talk to Me Ohio.

== Track listings ==
7" vinyl single

- "Country D.J." – 3:19
- "We Made Love" – 2:34

== Chart performance ==
Chart (1975)	Peak position
Canada Country Songs (RPM)	23
US Hot Country Songs (Billboard)	36
