= Where Are You Going, Billy Boy =

Single by Bill Anderson and Mary Lou Turner

from the album Billy Boy & Mary Lou
- B-side: "Can We Still Be Friends"
- Released: June 1977
- Recorded: March 1977
- Studio: Bradley's Barn, Mount Juliet, Tennessee
- Genre: Country; Countrypolitan
- Length: 2:37
- Label: MCA
- Songwriters: Dave Kirby; Glenn Martin
- Producer: Buddy Killen

Bill Anderson singles chronology
"Head to Toe" (1977)	"Where Are You Going, Billy Boy" (1977)	"Still the One" (1977)

Mary Lou Turner singles chronology
"The Man Still Turns Me On" (1977)	"Where Are You Going, Billy Boy" (1977)	"He Picked Me Up When You Let Me Down" (1977)

"Where Are You Going, Billy Boy" is a song written by Dave Kirby and Glenn Martin. It was first recorded as a duet by American country artists Bill Anderson and Mary Lou Turner. It was released as a single in 1977 via MCA Records and became a major hit the same year.

== Background and release ==
"Where Are You Going, Billy Boy" was recorded in March 1977 at Bradley's Barn studio in Mount Juliet, Tennessee. The session was produced by Buddy Killen. It was the pair's first production assignment with Killen.

"Where Are You Going, Billy Boy" was released as a single by MCA Records in June 1977. The song spent 12 weeks on the Billboard Hot Country Singles before reaching number 18 in September 1977. It was the pair's second top ten hit together and second to be spawned off the same studio album. In Canada, the single reached number 22 on the RPM Country Songs chart in 1977. It was first released on their 1977 studio album, Billy Boy & Mary Lou.

== Track listings ==
7" vinyl single

- "Where Are You Going, Billy Boy" – 2:37
- "Sad Ole Shade of Gray" – 2:18

== Chart performance ==
Chart (1977)	Peak position
Canada Country Songs (RPM)	22
US Hot Country Songs (Billboard)	18
