= Can I Come Home to You =

Single by Bill Anderson

from the album "Whispering" Bill Anderson
- B-side: "I'm Happily Married (And Plan on Staying That Way)"
- Released: May 1974
- Recorded: March 6, 1974
- Studio: Bradley's Barn, Mount Juliet, Tennessee
- Genre: Country; Nashville Sound
- Length: 2:48
- Label: MCA
- Songwriters: Jerry Crutchfield; Buddy Killen
- Producer: Owen Bradley

Bill Anderson singles chronology
"World of Make Believe" (1973)	"Can I Come Home to You" (1974)	"Every Time I Turn the Radio On" (1974)

"Can I Come to You" is a song written by Jerry Crutchfield and Buddy Killen. It was recorded by American country singer-songwriter Bill Anderson. It was released as a single in 1974 via MCA Records and became a major hit the same year.

== Background and release ==
"Can I Come to You" was recorded on March 6, 1974, at Bradley's Barn studio in Mount Juliet, Tennessee. The sessions were produced by Owen Bradley, who would serve as Anderson's producer through most of years with Decca Records. The album's B-side track was recorded during the same session: "I'm Happily Married (And Plan to Stay That Way)."

"Can I Come Home to You" was released as a single by MCA Records in May 1974. The song spent 14 weeks on the Billboard Hot Country Singles before reaching number 24 in August 1974. In Canada, the single became an even larger hit. It reached number two on the RPM Country Songs chart in 1974 in Canada. It was released on his 1974 studio album, "Whispering" Bill Anderson.

== Track listings ==
7" vinyl single

- "Can I Come Home to You" – 2:48
- "I'm Happily Married (And Plan to Stay That Way)" – 2:54

== Chart performance ==
Chart (1974)	Peak position
Canada Country Songs (RPM)	2
US Hot Country Songs (Billboard)	24
