= Anderson (album) =

Studio album by Bill Anderson
- Released: September 14, 2018
- Genre: Country
- Label: TWI
- Producers: Bill Anderson; Peter Cooper; Thomm Jutz

Bill Anderson chronology
Life! (2014)	Anderson (2018)	The Hits Re-Imagined (2020)

Singles from Anderson
- 1. "Everybody Wants to Be Twenty-One" Released: August 15, 2018; 2. "Waffle House Christmas" Released: November 23, 2018

Anderson is a studio album by American singer-songwriter Bill Anderson. It was released on September 14, 2018 via TWI Records. The project was co-produced by Anderson, Peter Cooper and Thomm Jutz. Consisting of 11 tracks, the album was Anderson's 44th studio release in recording career. It contained two singles "Everybody Wants to Be Twenty-One" and "Waffle House Christmas".

== Background and content ==
Anderson recalled that his co-producers envisioned the album's release and its production. "I know I’ve never enjoyed the recording process more than working here with Thomm Jutz and Peter Cooper. They had the vision…I just tried to follow their lead and bring their ideas to life. I only hope that as folks listen, they’ll feel we succeeded," he said.

The album was a collection of 11 tracks, all of which were written or co-written by Anderson himself. Among the writers Anderson composed material with for the album was Buddy Cannon and Jamey Johnson. Johnson co-wrote "Everybody Wants to Be Twenty-One", which was also released as a single. Originally, the pair intended to pitch the song to either Willie Nelson or George Strait. However, Anderson reconsidered. "The more I got to foolin' with it, listenin' to it, thinkin' about it, I thought, 'Well, this needs to be an older guy and a younger guy ... looiin' at it from each point of view," he recalled. In addition, the album's opening track, "Old Things New", was first recorded by Joe Nichols for his 2009 studio album of the same name.

== Release and reception ==
Professional ratings
Review scores
Source	Rating
Digital Journal	A

Anderson was officially released on September 14, 2018 on TWI Records, Anderson's own label. While being his 44th studio release, it was also his 72nd album, overall. The album was issued as both a compact disc and a music download. In preparation for the album's release, "Everybody Wants to Be Twenty-One" was released as the lead single on August 15, 2018. A music video was later filmed for the song, which also featured Jamey Johnson. The album did not chart on any publication at the time of its release, including Billboard. On November 23, 2018, "Waffle House Christmas" was issued as the album's second single.

Anderson received a positive response from the Digital Journal music publication following its release. Reviewer, Markos Papadatos praised Anderson's songwriting style and his ability to create stories through his lyrics. Overall he concluded by giving the release an "A" rating. "Bill Anderson shows no signs of slowing down anytime soon. This album is a testament to his longevity in the country music industry and his unmatched work ethic. Well done," he commented.

== Track listing ==
All tracks written by Bill Anderson, with additional writers noted.

Anderson (2018)
No.	Title	Writer(s)	Length
1.	"Old Things New"	Buddy Cannon; Paul Overstreet	3:38
2.	"Everybody Wants to Be Twenty-One" (featuring Jamey Johnson)	Jamey Johnson	3:25
3.	"Dixie Everywhere I Go"		3:33
4.	"Dead to You"	John Paul White	3:55
5.	"Something to Believe In"		3:42
6.	"Watchin' It Rain"	Dave Gibson	3:54
7.	"That's What Made Me Love You"	Lore Orion	3:13
8.	"Practice Leaving Town"	Lance Miller; Bobby Tomberlin	3:36
9.	"The Only Bible"	Tim Rushlow	3:40
10.	"Waffle House Christmas"	Erin Enderlin; Alex Kline	3:58
11.	"Thankful"		3:59

== Personnel ==
All credits are adapted from the release announcement on Bill Anderson's official website.

Musical and technical personnel

- Bill Anderson – lead vocals, producer
- Peter Cooper – producer
- Thomm Jutz – producer
- Andy Kern – engineering
- Alex McCollough – mixing

== Release history ==
Region	Date	Format	Label	Ref.
United States	September 14, 2018	Compact disc; music download	TWI Records	
