= I Still Feel the Same About You =

Single by Bill Anderson

from the album Every Time I Turn the Radio On/Talk to Me Ohio
- B-side: "Talk to Me Ohio"
- Released: January 1975
- Recorded: September 27, 1974
- Studio: RCA Victor (Nashville, Tennessee)
- Genre: Country; Countrypolitan
- Length: 2:54
- Label: MCA
- Songwriter: Bill Anderson
- Producer: Owen Bradley

Bill Anderson singles chronology
"Every Time I Turn the Radio On" (1974)	"I Still Feel the Same About You" (1975)	"Country D.J." (1975)

"I Still Feel the Same About You" is a song written and recorded by American country singer-songwriter Bill Anderson. It was released as a single in 1975 via MCA Records and became a major hit the same year.

== Background and release ==
"I Still Feel the Same About You" was recorded on September 27, 1974, at the RCA Studios, located in Nashville, Tennessee. It was Anderson's seventh formal session at the RCA Studio after spending many years recording at his producer's studio. The sessions were produced by Owen Bradley, who would serve as Anderson's producer through most of years with MCA Records. Two additional tracks were cut at the same studio session.

"Every Time I Turn the Radio On" was released as a single by MCA Records in January 1975. The song spent 11 weeks on the Billboard Hot Country Singles before reaching number 14 in April 1975. In Canada, the single reached number 16 on the RPM Country Songs chart in 1975. It was released on his 1975 studio album, Every Time I Turn the Radio On/Talk to Me Ohio.

== Track listings ==
7" vinyl single

- "I Still Feel the Same About You" – 2:54
- "Talk to Me Ohio" – 2:51

== Chart performance ==
Chart (1975)	Peak position
Canada Country Songs (RPM)	16
US Hot Country Songs (Billboard)	14
