= The Dream Never Dies =

Single by Bill Anderson
- B-side: "One More Sexy Lady"
- Released: July 1979
- Recorded: August 1977
- Studio: Bradley's Barn, Mount Juliet, Tennessee
- Genre: Country; Countrypolitan
- Length: 4:25
- Label: MCA
- Songwriter: Richard Cooper
- Producer: Buddy Killen

Bill Anderson singles chronology
"This Is a Love Song" (1979)	"The Dream Never Dies" (1979)	"More Than a Bedroom Thing" (1979)

"The Dream Never Dies" is a song written by Richard Cooper. It was first recorded by his band The Cooper Brothers in 1978 and included on their self-titled Capricorn Records album. It was also released as a single, b/w "Rock and Roll Cowboys". American country singer-songwriter Bill Anderson released it as a single in 1979 via MCA Records and had a top 40 hit single. Juice Newton also recorded the song that same year and released on her Take Heart album.

== Bill Anderson Background ==
"The Dream Never Dies" was recorded in August 1977 in Nashville, Tennessee. The session was produced by Buddy Killen, who recently became Anderson's producer after many years of working with Owen Bradley. Killen would continue producing Anderson until his departure from MCA Records. It was the only song recorded during this particular studio session.

"The Dream Never Dies" was released as a single by MCA Records in July 1979. The song spent nine weeks on the Billboard Hot Country Singles before reaching number 40 in August 1979. It was among Anderson's final top 40 singles of his career. It was also his second single to not become a major hit since 1975. In Canada, the single only reached number 42 on the RPM Country Songs chart in 1978.

== Track listings ==
7" vinyl single

- "The Dream Never Dies" – 4:25
- "One More Sexy Lady" – 2:44

== Chart performance ==
Chart (1978)	Peak position
Canada Country Songs (RPM)	42
US Hot Country Songs (Billboard)	40
