= The Corner of My Life =

Single by Bill Anderson

from the album Bill
- B-side: "Home and Things"
- Released: June 1973
- Genre: Country
- Label: MCA
- Songwriter: Bill Anderson

Bill Anderson singles chronology
"If You Can Live with It (I Can Live Without It)" (1973)	"The Corner of My Life" (1973)	"World of Make Believe" (1974)

"The Corner of My Life" is a single by American country music artist Bill Anderson. Released in June 1973, it was the second single from his album Bill. The song peaked at number 2 on the Billboard Hot Country Singles chart. It also reached number 1 on the RPM Country Tracks chart in Canada.

== Chart performance ==
Chart (1973)	Peak position
U.S. Billboard Hot Country Singles	2
Canadian RPM Country Tracks	1
