= Nashville Mirrors =

Studio album by Bill Anderson
- Released: 1980
- Recorded: September 1979
- Genres: Country; Countrypolitan
- Label: MCA
- Producer: Buddy Killen

Bill Anderson chronology
Ladies Choice (1979)	Nashville Mirrors (1980)	Southern Fried (1983)

Singles from Nashville Mirrors
- 1. "More Than a Bedroom Thing" Released: November 1979; 2. "Make Mine Night Time" Released: April 1980; 3. "I Want That Feelin' Again" Released: October 1980

Nashville Mirrors is a studio album by American country singer-songwriter Bill Anderson. It was released in 1980 on MCA Records and was produced by Buddy Killen. His 30th studio album, it was also Anderson's final album effort with his long-time record label. The album included three singles that reached minor positions on the Billboard country songs chart.

== Background and content ==
Nashville Mirrors was recorded in September 1979 in sessions held produced by Buddy Killen. It was Anderson's final release produced by Killen, after collaborating with each other for four years. The record would also be Anderson's final album with MCA. His contract with the label would remain through 1981 before departing and recording for a smaller, independent company. The project consisted of ten tracks. Seven of these tracks were written or co-written by Anderson. Also included were cover versions of songs previously recorded and made successful by other artists. Included is the track, "We've Got Tonite", which was first a hit by its writer, Bob Seger. Other compositions were written by Nashville songwriters such as Curly Putman and Mike Kosser.

== Release ==
Nashville Mirrors was released in 1980 via MCA Records. It became Anderson's 30th studio album upon its release. The project was issued in two formats. First, it was issued as a vinyl LP, featuring five songs on both sides of the record. It was also issued as a cassette in a similar song format. It was his first studio recording since the early 1960s to not chart in any Billboard Magazine chart publications. However, the album's three singles did chart on the Billboard Hot Country Singles survey. Its first single, "More Than a Bedroom Thing", was released in November 1979. The single only became a minor hit, reaching number 50 in early 1980. Its second single issued was "Make Mine Night Time" in April 1980. It became Anderson's final top forty single following its peak in May. Its third single, "I Want That Feelin' Again" only spent three weeks on the country chart and peaked at number 83. Additionally, "More Than a Bedroom Thing" was Anderson's final single to make a chart appearance on the Canadian RPM Country Singles list, peaking at number 71.

== Track listing ==
All tracks written by Bill Anderson, except where noted.

Side one
No.	Title	Writer(s)	Length
1.	"Make Mine Night Time"	Mike Kosser; Curly Putman	3:43
2.	"The Old Me and You"		2:54
3.	"More Than a Bedroom Thing"		2:49
4.	"I'm Used to the Rain"		3:09
5.	"We've Got Tonite"	Bob Seger	3:23

Side two
No.	Title	Writer(s)	Length
1.	"Nashville Mirrors"	Chance Jones; Sid Linard	3:31
2.	"(Her Wedding Ring's A) One Man Band"	Jane Abbott; Anderson	3:37
3.	"She Made Me Remember"		3:08
4.	"I Want That Feelin' Again"		3:07
5.	"Love Me and I'll Be Your Best Friend"		2:48

== Personnel ==
All credits are adapted from the liner notes of Nashville Mirrors.

Musical personnel

- Bill Anderson – lead vocals
- Randy Bethune – background vocals
- David Briggs – piano
- Charles Chappelaer – horn
- Phil Forrest – background vocals
- Jim Glaser – background vocals
- Mike Johnston – steel guitar
- Louis Johnson – bass
- Buddy Killen – bass
- Larry Londin – drums
- Fred Newell – guitar
- Susan Ladd – background vocals
- Susan Meredith – background vocals
- Monty Parkey – background vocals

- Hargus "Pig" Robbins – piano
- Jerry Shook – guitar
- Jack Smith – steel guitar
- Don Sheffield – horn
- Donna Sheridan – background vocals
- Buddy Spicher – fiddle
- Gordon Stoker – background vocals
- Mike Streeter – background vocals
- Henry Strzelecki – bass
- Dennis Wilson – background vocals
- Hurshel Wiginton – background vocals
- Bobby Wood – piano
- Reggie Young – guitar

Technical personnel

- Mike Bradley – engineering
- Dennis Carney – cover photo
- Buddy Killen – producer
- Don Paul Millie – cover photo (back)
- Travis Turk – engineering
- Ernie Winfrey – engineering

== Release history ==
Region	Date	Format	Label	Ref.
Canada	1980	Vinyl; cassette	MCA	
United States	1980	Vinyl; cassette	MCA	
