= Peanuts and Diamonds and Other Jewels =

Studio album by Bill Anderson
- Released: September 1976
- Recorded: 1975–1976
- Studios: Bradley's Barn, Mt. Juliet, Tennessee
- Genres: Country; Countrypolitan
- Label: MCA
- Producers: Owen Bradley; Buddy Killen

Bill Anderson chronology
Sometimes (1976)	Peanuts and Diamonds and Other Jewels (1976)	Scorpio (1977)

Singles from Peanuts and Diamonds and Other Jewels
- 1. "Thanks" Released: July 1975; 2. "Peanuts and Diamonds" Released: July 1976; 3. "Liars One, Believers Zero" Released: November 1976

Peanuts and Diamonds and Other Jewels is a studio album by American country singer-songwriter Bill Anderson. It was released in September 1976 on MCA Records. It was co-produced by Owen Bradley and Buddy Killen. It was Anderson's twenty fifth studio recording released during his musical career and second to be released in 1976. The album included three singles issued between 1975 and 1976, two of which became major country hits in both the United States and Canada.

== Background and content ==
Peanuts and Diamonds and Other Jewels was recorded between 1975 and 1976. The sessions took place at Bradley's Barn studio in Mount Juliet, Tennessee. The sessions were produced by Owen Bradley and Buddy Killen. This was Anderson's first production assignment with Killen. The album was Anderson's twenty fifth overall, since beginning his first release debuted in 1963. The project consisted of ten new studio recordings. Five of the album's tracks were written by Anderson. Other tracks included on the album were written by Curly Putnam, Bobby Braddock and Glenn Martin.

== Release and chart performance ==
Peanuts, Diamonds and Other Jewels was released in September 1976 on MCA Records, his second studio album released that year. The album was issued as a vinyl LP, with five songs featured on each side of the record. It spent 14 weeks on the Billboard Top Country Albums chart before peaking at number 12 in November 1976. The album's first single released was the track "Thanks" in July 1975. The single became a minor hit on the Billboard Hot Country Singles chart, reaching number 24.

The title track ("Peanuts and Diamonds") was released as the second single in July 1976. The song became a major hit after it reached number ten on the Billboard country songs chart. The song also reached the top ten of the RPM Country Chart in Canada, peaking at number seven. The third and final single issued was the track "Liars One, Believers Zero" in November 1976. It also became a top ten hit on the Billboard country chart when it reached number six in February 1977. The song was another major hit in Canada, reaching number five on the Canadian country singles chart.

== Track listing ==
Side one
No.	Title	Writer(s)	Length
1.	"Peanuts and Diamonds"	Bobby Braddock	3:10
2.	"Meanwhile Back in Cleveland"	Bill Anderson	3:26
3.	"Let Me Whisper Darling One More Time"	Anderson; Buddy Killen; Red Williams	2:56
4.	"Your Love Blows Me Away"	Curly Putman; Sterling Whipple	3:03
5.	"Why'd the Last Time Have to Be the Best"	Williams	2:46

Side two
No.	Title	Writer(s)	Length
1.	"Liars One, Believers Zero"	Glenn Martin	2:39
2.	"We've Got It All"	Anderson	3:23
3.	"Sweet Texas"	Anderson	2:52
4.	"Daddy You Know What"	Jim Wilson	3:08
5.	"Thanks"	Bill Martin, Phil Coulter	2:26

== Personnel ==
All credits are adapted from the liner notes of Peanuts and Diamonds and Other Jewels.

Musical personnel

- Joe Allen – bass
- Bill Anderson – lead vocals
- David Briggs – piano
- Martin Chantry – strings
- Roy Christensen – strings
- Jimmy Colvard – guitar
- Bobby Emmons – organ
- Gregg Galbraith – guitar
- Sonny Garrish – steel guitar
- Carl Gorozetzky – strings
- Doyle Grisham – steel guitar
- The Holladays – background vocals
- The Jordanaires – background vocals

- Martin Katahn – strings
- Dave Kirby – guitar
- Sheldon Kurland – strings
- Bob Leech – bass
- Larry Londin – drums
- Kenny Malone – drums
- Bob Moore – bass
- The Nashville Edition – background vocals
- Jack Smith – steel guitar
- Donald Teal – strings
- Bobby Wood – piano
- Woody Woodard – organ
- Gary Vanosdale – strings

Technical personnel

- Bobby Bradley – engineering
- Owen Bradley – producer
- David Hogan – cover design
- Hot Graphics – cover design
- Buddy Killen – producer
- Joe Mills – engineering
- John R. Miller – photography
- Ernie Winfrey – engineering

== Chart performance ==
Chart (1976)	Peak position
US Top Country Albums (Billboard)	12

== Release history ==
Region	Date	Format	Label	Ref.
Canada	September 1976	Vinyl	MCA	
United States	September 1976	Vinyl	MCA	
