= Scorpio (Bill Anderson album) =

Studio album by Bill Anderson
- Released: April 1977
- Recorded: November 1976
- Studios: Bradley's Barn, Mount Juliet, Tennessee
- Genres: Country; Countrypolitan
- Label: MCA
- Producer: Buddy Killen

Bill Anderson chronology
Peanuts and Diamonds and Other Jewels (1976)	Scorpio (1977)	Billy Boy & Mary Lou (1977)

Singles from Scorpio
- 1. "Head to Toe" Released: March 1977; 2. "Still the One" Released: October 1977

Scorpio is a studio album by American country singer-songwriter Bill Anderson. It was released in April 1977 on MCA Records and was produced by Buddy Killen. Scorpio was Anderson's 26th studio album as a recording artist and the first album release of 1977. Another album would follow later in the year. The project produced two singles that became major hits.

== Background and content ==
Scorpio was the first album project that Buddy Killen produced. By the late 1970s, Anderson had been recording for Decca (now MCA) since 1958 under the direction of producer Owen Bradley. During the later half of the 70s, Killen became more interested in recording Anderson. Killen brought him to the attention of the label, who put him under a contract to record Anderson. The agreement lasted until 1981 when Anderson eventually left the label. The album consisted of ten tracks previously unrecorded by Anderson. Three of these tracks were composed by Anderson himself. Additional tracks were written by other writers, notably Bobby Braddock, who wrote two of the record's songs. Like previous releases, the tracks were recorded at Bradley's Barn studio in Mount Juliet, Tennessee. The sessions took place in November 1976.

== Release and reception ==
Professional ratings
Review scores
Source	Rating
Billboard	Favorable

Scorpio was released in April 1977 on MCA Records. The album was issued as a vinyl LP, with five songs on each side of the record. The album spent nine weeks on the Billboard Top Country Albums chart before peaking at number 21 in June 1977. Scorpio produced two singles that became major hits. The first was the opening track "Head to Toe". Released as a single in March 1977, it became a major hit on the Billboard Hot Country Songs chart after peaking at number seven in June. The song also became a major hit on the RPM Country Singles chart after it reached number four.

A cover of "Still the One" was the second single released from the album. Issued in October 1977, the single peaked at number 11 on the Billboard country chart. In Canada, the song reached number 13 on the RPM chart. In its May issue, Billboard magazine gave Scorpio a positive review, praising the hit "Head to Toe". Writers also critiqued the album as a whole. "Kicked off the by the singer's new single, 'Head to Toe', which is currently leaping up the charts after two weeks, this album is an exceptional effort for Anderson," they wrote.

== Track listing ==
Side one
No.	Title	Writer(s)	Length
1.	"Head to Toe"	Bobby Braddock	2:30
2.	"Come Back"	Dave Kirby; Danny Morrison	2:47
3.	"We Held On"	Jerry King; Lou Johnson; Joe Tex	3:09
4.	"Movie Queen"	Paul Kelly	3:41
5.	"Still the One"	Johanna Hall; John Hall	3:20

Side two
No.	Title	Writer(s)	Length
1.	"Velvet and Steel"	Braddock	3:07
2.	"Mama Never Got to Rock Us"	Jerri Kelly	2:52
3.	"Love Song for Jackie"	Bill Anderson	2:57
4.	"This Ole Suitcase"	Anderson	4:14
5.	"You're Worth Waiting For"	Anderson	2:59

== Personnel ==
All credits are adapted from the liner notes of Scorpio.

Musical personnel

- Bill Anderson – lead vocals
- Eddy Anderson – drums
- Martin Chantry – strings
- Roy Christensen – strings
- James Colvard – guitar
- Bobby Emmons – piano, organ
- Carol Gorodetzky – strings
- The Holladays – background vocals
- The Jordanaires – background vocals
- Martin Katahn – strings
- Dave Kirby – guitar

- Sheldon Kurland – strings
- Larry Londin – drums
- The Nashville Edition – background vocals
- Billy Sanford – guitar
- Jack Smith – steel guitar
- Donald Teal – strings
- Gary Vanosdale – strings
- Dennis Wilson – bass
- Bobby Wood – piano, organ
- Woody Woodard – piano, organ
- Reggie Young – guitar

Technical personnel

- Larry Boden – engineering, mastering
- David Hogan – design and cover
- Buddy Killen – producer
- Jim McGuire – photography
- Ernie Winfrey – engineering

== Chart performance ==
Chart (1977)	Peak position
US Top Country Albums (Billboard)	21

== Release history ==
Region	Date	Format	Label	Ref.
Australia	April 1977	Vinyl	MCA	
Canada	April 1977	Vinyl	MCA	
United States	April 1977	Vinyl	MCA	
