= Billy Boy & Mary Lou =

Studio album by Bill Anderson and Mary Lou Turner
- Released: June 1977
- Recorded: March 1977
- Studios: Bradley's Barn, Mount Juliet, Tennessee
- Genres: Country; Countrypolitan
- Label: MCA
- Producer: Buddy Killen

Bill Anderson chronology
Scorpio (1977)	Billy Boy & Mary Lou (1977)	Love...& Other Sad Stories (1978)

Mary Lou Turner chronology
Sometimes (1976)	Billy Boy & Mary Lou (1977)

Singles from Billy Boy & Mary Lou
- 1. "Where Are You Going, Billy Boy" Released: June 1977; 2. "I'm Way Ahead of You" Released: January 1978

Billy Boy & Mary Lou is a studio album by American country music artists Bill Anderson and Mary Lou Turner. It was released in June 1977 on MCA Records and was produced by Buddy Killen. It was the duo's second studio album together since pairing up as a duet team in the mid 1970s. The album produced two singles between 1977 and 1978. It would be the duo's final studio album together.

== Background and content ==
Billy Boy & Mary Lou was Anderson and Turner's second studio release together. The pair began collaborating after Anderson's former duet partner (Jan Howard) left his road show for personal reasons. Turner replaced her and their first studio album together was issued in 1976 and featured a number one hit single. Billy Boy & Mary Lou would be their second and final studio recording together. It was produced by Buddy Killen in March 1977 at Bradley's Barn studio in Mount Juliet, Tennessee. The album was a collection of ten tracks. It included three compositions written by Anderson himself. They included "Children" and "We Made Love (But Where's the Love We Made)", which both appeared on "side two" of the record. Additional tracks were original recordings that were composed by several different songwriters. Writers Curly Putman and Sonny Throckmorton composed four of the album's tracks.

== Release and reception ==
Billy Boy & Mary Lou was released in June 1977 on MCA Records. It was issued as a vinyl record with five songs on both sides of the record. The album spent five weeks on the Billboard Top Country Albums chart before peaking at number 39 in October 1977. Billy Boy & Mary Lou was Turner's final chart appearance on the latter chart. The album included two singles released between 1977 and 1978. The first single, "Where Are You Going Billy Boy", was released in June 1977. Spending 12 weeks on the Billboard Hot Country Singles chart, it reached a peak position of 18 on the latter chart. The single also climbed to number 22 on the Canadian RPM Country Singles chart.

A second single was released to radio in January 1978. The track, "I'm Way Ahead of You", peaked at number 25 on the Billboard country songs chart after a ten-week chart run. The single also became a top 40 hit on the RPM Country Singles chart, reaching number 30. The album received a negative review from Allmusic, receiving only two stars. Critic Eugene Chadbourne commented that the songwriting quality was low. Chadbourne highlighted the track, "Country Lay on Mind", in his review. "'Country Lay on My Mind' is not just an example of a substandard theme in country songwriting (i.e., songs about just how darn country the artist is). It drags in sexual metaphors and it is hard to believe these performers weren't aware of what they would wind up with -- take another look at the title to get the point," he commented.

== Track listing ==
Side one
No.	Title	Writer(s)	Length
1.	"Country Lay on My Mind"	Red Lane	3:44
2.	"I'm Way Ahead of You"	Curly Putman; Sonny Throckmorton	3:04
3.	"What We're Taking Here Tonight"	Putman; Throckmorton	2:14
4.	"Just Enough to Make Me Want It All"	Bill Anderson; Johnny Russell	2:41
5.	"I've Been Lovin' You Too Long"	Putman; Throckmorton	2:31

Side two
No.	Title	Writer(s)	Length
1.	"Building Fires"	Johnny Christopher; Jim Dickinson; Dan Penn	3:45
2.	"Children"	Jerri Kelly	3:45
3.	"We Made Love (But Where's the Love We Made)"	Becki Anderson; Bill Anderson	2:41
4.	"Where Are You Going, Billy Boy"	Dave Kirby; Glenn Martin	2:37
5.	"Sad Old Shade of Gray"	Martin; Throckmorton	2:17

== Personnel ==
All credits are adapted from the liner notes of Billy Boy & Mary Lou.

Musical and technical personnel

- Bill Anderson – lead vocals
- Buddy Killen – producer
- Mary Lou Turner – lead vocals

== Chart performance ==
Chart (1977)	Peak position
US Top Country Albums (Billboard)	39

== Release history ==
Region	Date	Format	Label	Ref.
Canada	June 1977	Vinyl	MCA	
United States	June 1977	Vinyl	MCA	
