= Don't She Look Good (song) =

Single by Bill Anderson

from the album Don't She Look Good
- B-side: "I'm Just Gone"
- Released: August 1972
- Recorded: June 29, 1972
- Studio: Bradley Studio
- Genre: Country; Nashville Sound
- Length: 2:07
- Label: Decca
- Songwriter: Jerry Chesnut
- Producer: Owen Bradley

Bill Anderson singles chronology
| "All the Lonely Women in the World" (1972) | "Don't She Look Good" (1972) | "If You Can Live with It (I Can Live Without It)" (1973) |

"Don't She Look Good" is a song written by Jerry Chesnut and recorded by American country singer-songwriter Bill Anderson. It was released as a single in 1972 via Decca Records and became a major hit that same year.

== Background and release ==
"Don't She Look Good" was recorded on June 29, 1972, at Bradley Studio, in Nashville, Tennessee. The session was produced by Owen Bradley, who served as Anderson's producer for most of his years with Decca Records. Two additional tracks were also recorded during the same session: "Watching It" and "I m Just Gone."

The song was released as a single by Decca Records in August 1972. It spent 16 weeks on the Billboard Hot Country Singles, eventually reaching number two in May 1972. In Canada, the single also peaked at number two on the RPM Country Songs chart. "Don't She Look Good" was later included on Anderson's 1972 LP of the same name, Don't She Look Good.

== Track listings ==
7" vinyl single

- "Don't She Look Good" – 2:07
- "I'm Just Gone" – 2:35

== Chart performance ==
| Chart (1971) | Peak position |
|---|---|
| Canada Country Songs (RPM) | 2 |
| US Hot Country Songs (Billboard) | 2 |
