= Songwriter (Bill Anderson album) =

Studio album by Bill Anderson
- Released: May 2010
- Genre: Country
- Length: 42:37
- Label: TWI
- Producers: Bill Anderson; Rex Schnelle

Bill Anderson chronology
Whisperin' Bluegrass (2007)	Songwriter (2010)	Life! (2014)

Singles from Songwriter
- 1. "Thanks to You" Released: 2010

Songwriter is a studio album by American country singer-songwriter Bill Anderson. It was released via TWI Records in May 2010. The project was co-produced by Bill Anderson and Rex Schnelle. It was Anderson's 42nd studio album in his recording career and contained a total of 12 tracks.

== Background and content ==
Songwriter was originally going to be titled Good Time Gettin' Here, but Anderson changed the name for one reason. "So then I began to think of some songs that I've had that had not been recorded that I was proud of, and the whole thing just evolved. One day I said, 'Why don't we just call it 'Songwriter?' Basically if I'm anything, I guess that's what I am," he recalled in 2010. Anderson co-produced the project with Rex Schnelle. The pair has recorded several studio albums in the past.

The album was a collection of 12 tracks, all of which were written by Anderson. Many of the album's tracks contained collaborations with other artists. The fourth track, "If You Can't Make Money", includes a guitar solo from Brad Paisley. Other collaborations on the project include Jon Randall and Billy Montana.

== Release ==
Songwriter was released in May 2010 on Anderson's label called TWI Records. It was offered as a compact disc and a music download. The album did not chart on any publication at the time of its release, including Billboard. The final album track, "Thanks to You", was released as a single in 2010 but did not reach any charting positions.

== Track listing ==
All tracks written by Bill Anderson, with additional writers noted.

Songwriter (2010)
No.	Title	Writer(s)	Length
1.	"It Ain't My Job to Tote Your Monkey"	Rivers Rutherford; Rex Schnelle	3:00
2.	"Good Time Gettin' Here"	Buddy Cannon; Jamey Johnson	3:38
3.	"If Anything Ever Happened to You"	Jon Randall	4:34
4.	"If You Can't Make Money" (featuring Brad Paisley)	Brad Paisley; Randall	2:48
5.	"One Bad Memory"	Barry Dean; Tim Nichols	3:30
6.	"Papaw's Sunday Boots"	Josh Ragsdale	4:09
7.	"Wherever She Is"	Jim Martin; Bobby Tomberlin	3:44
8.	"The Songwriters"	Gordie Sampson	3:49
9.	"That's When the Fight Broke Out"	Schnelle	3:36
10.	"Some Kind of War"	Coley McCabe; John Wiggins	3:11
11.	"While Talking to Myself"	Billy Montana	3:14
12.	"Thanks to You"	Brad Crisler	3:24
Total length:			42:37

== Personnel ==
All credits are adapted from the liner notes of Songwriter.

- Bill Anderson – producer, lead vocals
- Brad Paisley – guitar
- Rex Schnelle – producer

== Release history ==
Region	Date	Format	Label	Ref.
United States	May 2010	Compact disc; music download	TWI Records	
