= If You Can Live with It (I Can Live Without It) =

"if You Can Live With It (I Can Live Without It)"

Single by Bill Anderson

from the album Bill
- B-side: "(All Together Now) Let's Fall Apart"
- Released: January 1973
- Recorded: December 11, 1972
- Studio: Bradley Studio
- Genre: Country; Nashville Sound
- Length: 2:43
- Label: MCA
- Songwriter: Bill Anderson
- Producer: Owen Bradley

Bill Anderson singles chronology
"Don't She Look Good" (1972)	"if You Can Live With It (I Can Live Without It)" (1973)	"The Corner of My Life" (1973)

"If You Can Live with It (I Can Live Without It)" is a song written and recorded by American country singer-songwriter Bill Anderson. It was released as a single in 1973 via MCA Records and became a major hit the same year.

== Background and release ==
"If You Can Live With It (I Can Live Without It)" was recorded on December 11, 1972, at the Bradley Studio, located in Nashville, Tennessee. The sessions were produced by Owen Bradley, who would serve as Anderson's producer through most of years with Decca Records. The album's B-side track was recorded during the same session.

"If You Can Live with It" was released as a single by MCA Records in January 1973. It was Anderson's first single release on MCA after his previous label (Decca Records) switched names. The song spent 14 weeks on the Billboard Hot Country Singles before reaching number two in May 1973. In Canada, the single reached number two on the RPM Country Songs chart. It was released on his 1973 studio album, Bill.

== Track listings ==
7" vinyl single

- "if You Can Live with It (I Can Live Without It)" – 2:43
- "(All Together Now) Let's Fall Apart" – 2:20

== Chart performance ==
Chart (1971)	Peak position
Canada Country Songs (RPM)	2
US Hot Country Songs (Billboard)	2
