= Love...& Other Sad Stories =

Studio album by Bill Anderson
- Released: 1978
- Recorded: March 1978
- Studios: Bradley's Barn, Mount Juliet, Tennessee
- Genres: Country; Countrypolitan
- Label: MCA
- Producer: Buddy Killen

Bill Anderson chronology
Billy Boy & Mary Lou (1977)	Love...& Other Sad Stories (1978)	Ladies Choice (1979)

Singles from Love...& Other Sad Stories
- 1. "I Can't Wait Any Longer" Released: April 1978

Love...& Other Sad Stories is a studio album by American country singer-songwriter Bill Anderson. It was released in 1978 on MCA Records and was produced by Buddy Killen. The album was Anderson's 28th studio recording in his career and was among his final MCA albums. The record included the song, "I Can't Wait Any Longer". Issued as a single, it became a major country hit and minor crossover hit in 1978. It was Anderson's biggest hit single in several years and relaunched his career as a country pop vocalist. The album itself would also receive reception from writers and would chart in music publications.

== Background and content ==
Love...& Other Sad Stories was recorded in March 1978 in sessions produced by Buddy Killen. It was Anderson's third solo project with Killen since first working together in 1976. The sessions were recorded at Bradley's Barn studio in Mount Juliet, Tennessee. The album was a collection of ten tracks. Of these tracks, six were written by Anderson himself. This included "I Can't Wait Any Longer". Other songs were compositions written by Nashville songwriters such as Curly Putman, Bobby Braddock and Sonny Throckmorton.

The tenth track, "I Wonder If God Likes Country Music", featured a collaboration with Grand Ole Opry performer Roy Acuff. In the album's liner notes, Anderson thanked Acuff for joining him. "A special THANKS to Roy Acuff, who will always be the 'King of Country Music'", Anderson wrote. The record's songs were themed around the idea of love and love lost. The subject of the songs also looked at sexuality and intimacy in relationships. Examples of this included "I Can't Wait Any Longer" and "Smooth Southern Highway".

== Release and reception ==
Professional ratings
Review scores
Source	Rating
AllMusic	1.5/5 stars

Love...& Other Sad Stories was released in 1978 on MCA Records, becoming Anderson's 28th studio album. The album was issued as a vinyl record with five songs on each side. The project was Anderson's lowest-charting solo album to date, reaching a peak of 37 on the Billboard Top Country Albums list. In Canada, the record became Anderson's first to reach the RPM Country Albums chart, peaking at number five. The project included only one single, "I Can't Wait Any Longer". The song was released as a single in April 1978. It became Anderson's biggest hit on the Billboard Hot Country Singles chart in several years, reaching number four by July of that year. It also became his first single since 1970 to chart on the Billboard Hot 100, spending four weeks on the list and peaking at number 80 in July. On the RPM country singles chart, the song peaked at number one, his final chart-topping hit.

Love...& Other Sad Stories received a mixed reception from writers and critics. In a July 1978 Billboard publication, writers noticed a change in Anderson's musical style with the release. "Bill Anderson's wide appeal is crossing over the U.S. with his burgeoning, chart climbing, smash single 'I Can't Wait Any Longer' from his latest album Love...& Other Sad Stories," staff writers commented. Meanwhile, Eugene Chadbourne of AllMusic criticized the album's negative portrayal of women's physicality, notably on "I Can't Wait Any Longer". "If the opening text of 'I Can't Wait Any Longer' were a prank phone call, it could result in prosecution; if the string arrangement on this opener was also involved, it could frankly be considered a hate crime," he commented. Chadbourne later criticized the album's production, calling it "positively frightening." "This is an album that begins with what sounds like a pervert and ends with an effect described as frightening. Too bad most of it is so boring to listen to," he concluded.

== Track listing ==
All tracks written by Bill Anderson, except where noted.

Side one
No.	Title	Writer(s)	Length
1.	"I Can't Wait Any Longer"	Anderson; Buddy Killen	4:26
2.	"How Married Are You, Mary Ann?"		3:02
3.	"Smooth Southern Highway"	Curly Putman; Sonny Throckmorton	2:57
4.	"All That Keeps Me Goin'"		2:36
5.	"Joanna"		3:38

Side two
No.	Title	Writer(s)	Length
1.	"Ride Off in the Sunset"	Putman; Throckmorton	4:00
2.	"Whiskey Can't Sing"		2:46
3.	"On His Way Down the River"	Bobby Braddock	4:03
4.	"Summer Sun"		3:24
5.	"I Wonder If God Likes Country Music" (featuring Roy Acuff)	Bobbie Jean Carroll; Orville Couch	4:18

== Personnel ==
All credits are adapted from the liner notes of Love...& Other Sad Stories.

Musical personnel

- Bill Anderson – lead vocals
- George Brinkley III – strings
- Marvin Chantry – strings
- Roy Christensen – strings
- Bobby Emmons – piano
- Johnny Gimble – fiddle
- Carol Gorozetsky – strings
- The Jordanaires – background vocals
- Sheldon Kurland – strings
- The Nashville Edition – background vocals
- Steven Smith – strings
- Gary Vanosdale – strings
- Bobby Wood – piano
- Stephanie Woolf – strings

Technical personnel

- Rich Adler – engineering
- Buddy Killen – producer
- David Hogan – art direction
- John R. Miller – photography
- Ernie Winfrey – engineering

== Chart performance ==
Chart (1978)	Peak position
Canada Country Albums/LP's (RPM)	5
US Top Country Albums (Billboard)	37

== Release history ==
Region	Date	Format	Label	Ref.
Canada	1978	Vinyl	MCA	
United Kingdom	1978	Vinyl	MCA	
United States	1978	Vinyl	MCA	
