= Head to Toe (Bill Anderson song) =

Single by Bill Anderson

from the album Scorpio
- B-side: "Love Song for Jackie"
- Released: March 1977
- Recorded: December 6, 1976
- Studio: Bradley's Barn, Mount Juliet, Tennessee
- Genre: Country; Countrypolitan
- Length: 2:30
- Label: MCA
- Songwriter: Bobby Braddock
- Producer: Buddy Killen

Bill Anderson singles chronology
"Liars One, Believers Zero" (1976)	"Head to Toe" (1977)	"Where Are You Going, Billy Boy" (1977)

"Head to Toe" is a song written by Bobby Braddock. It was first recorded by American country singer-songwriter Bill Anderson. It was released as a single in 1977 via MCA Records and became a major hit the following year.

== Background and release ==
"Head to Toe" was recorded on December 6, 1976 at Bradley's Barn, located in Mount Juliet, Tennessee. The session was produced by Buddy Killen, who had recently become Anderson's producer after many years of working with Owen Bradley. Killen would continue producing Anderson until his departure from MCA Records. Four additional songs were recorded during the same December studio session.

"Head to Toe" was released as a single by MCA Records in March 1977. The song spent 13 weeks on the Billboard Hot Country Singles before reaching number six in June 1977. In Canada, the single reached number four on the RPM Country Songs chart in 1977. It was first released on his 1977 studio album, Scorpio.

== Track listings ==
7" vinyl single

- "Head to Toe" – 2:30
- "Love Song for Jackie" – 2:57

== Chart performance ==
Chart (1977)	Peak position
Canada Country Songs (RPM)	4
US Hot Country Songs (Billboard)	7
