= Sometimes (Bill Anderson song) =

Single by Bill Anderson and Mary Lou Turner

from the album Sometimes
- B-side: "Circle in a Triangle"
- Released: November 1975
- Genre: Country
- Label: MCA
- Songwriter: Bill Anderson
- Producer: Owen Bradley

Bill Anderson singles chronology
"Thanks" (1975)	"Sometimes" (1975)	"That's What Made Me Love You" (1976)

Mary Lou Turner singles chronology
"Come on Home" (1975)	"Sometimes" (1975)	"That's What Made Me Love You" (1976)

"Sometimes"

Single by Facts of Life

from the album Sometimes
- B-side: "Love Is the Final Truth"
- Released: December 1976
- Genre: R&B
- Length: 3:44
- Label: Kayvette
- Songwriter: Bill Anderson
- Producer: Millie Jackson

"Sometimes" is a 1975 song written by Bill Anderson, and performed by Bill Anderson and Mary Lou Turner.

== Background ==
Anderson wrote the song while riding on a bus in England. Reading a review of Shampoo, he noticed a section detailing a scene where a character's response when asked if they are married is "sometimes". Anderson decided this would be an excellent setup for a duet, jotting down the first draft of the lyrics on the magazine the review was in.

== Charts ==
"Sometimes" reached number one on the country chart, where it stayed for a single week and spent a total of eleven weeks on the chart.

Chart (1975–76)	Peak position
U.S. Billboard Hot Country Singles	1
Canadian RPM Country Tracks	3

== Cover versions ==
- In 1977, R&B trio, Facts of Life reached number thirty-one on the U.S. Billboard Hot 100 with their version which was produced by Millie Jackson.
