= Every Time I Turn the Radio On/Talk to Me Ohio =

Studio album by Bill Anderson
- Released: January 1975
- Recorded: 1974
- Studios: RCA Victor (Nashville, Tennessee)
- Genres: Country; Countrypolitan
- Label: MCA
- Producer: Owen Bradley

Bill Anderson chronology
"Whispering" Bill Anderson (1974)	Every Time I Turn the Radio On/Talk to Me Ohio (1975)	Live from London (1975)

Singles from Every Time I Turn the Radio On/Talk to Me Ohio
- 1. "Every Time I Turn the Radio On" Released: September 1974; 2. "I Still Feel the Same About You" Released: January 1975; 3. "Country D.J." Released: May 1975

Every Time I Turn the Radio On/Talk to Me Ohio is a studio album by American country singer-songwriter Bill Anderson. It was released in January 1975 on MCA Records and was produced by Owen Bradley.

It was Anderson's twenty third studio album to be issued and included three singles that became hits between 1974 and 1975. The album also reached major positions on the Billboard country albums chart upon its release date.

== Background and content ==
Every Time I Turn the Radio On/Talk to Me Ohio was recorded in 1974 in sessions produced by Owen Bradley. Anderson had been under the production of Bradley since early years with the label. It would be their twenty third studio album together. The sessions were held at the RCA Victor Studios in Nashville, Tennessee. This was unlike Anderson's previous sessions that were recorded at Bradley's Barn. The project contained 11 tracks. Eight of the album's tracks were composed entirely by Anderson. The remaining tracks were written by other songwriters and musical artists. Among these were cover versions of songs first recorded by others. One example of this was "Gonna Find Me a Bluebird", which was first recorded by Marvin Rainwater. Another cover on the album is "Let Me Be the One", which was first recorded by Hank Locklin.

== Release and chart performance ==
Every Time I Turn the Radio On/Talk to Me Ohio was released in January 1975 on MCA Records. It was issued as a vinyl LP, with six songs on side one and five songs on side two. After spending ten weeks on the chart, the album peaked at number 22 on the Billboard Top Country Albums chart in March 1975. The album produced three singles between 1974 and 1975. The first was "Every Time I Turn the Radio On", which peaked at number seven on the Billboard Hot Country Singles chart. The song also peaked at number four on the RPM Country Singles chart in Canada. The second single was "I Still Feel the Same About You", the flip side to the title track, "Talk to Me Ohio". The single also became a major hit, peaking at number 14 on the Billboard country chart and number 16 on the Canadian country chart. The third (and final) single issued was the track, "Country D.J." in May 1975. The single only reached number 36 on the Billboard country chart and number 23 on the Canadian country chart after its release.

== Track listing ==
All tracks written by Bill Anderson, except where noted.

Side one
No.	Title	Writer(s)	Length
1.	"Every Time I Turn the Radio On"		2:11
2.	"Gonna Find Me a Bluebird"	Marvin Rainwater	2:24
3.	"I Still Feel the Same About You"		2:54
4.	"Country D.J."		3:19
5.	"A Perfect Angel"	Ben Peters	2:42
6.	"Roller Coaster Ride"		2:42

Side two
No.	Title	Writer(s)	Length
1.	"Talk to Me Ohio"		2:54
2.	"Let Me Be the One"	Paul Blevins; Joe Hobson; W.S. Stevenson	2:19
3.	"Concrete"		2:54
4.	"You Are My Story (You Are My Song)"		2:59
5.	"The Only Way to Travel"		2:46

== Personnel ==
All credits are adapted from the liner notes of Every Time I Turn the Radio On/Talk to Me Ohio.

Musical personnel

- Bill Anderson – lead vocals
- Byron Bach – strings
- Brenton Banks – strings
- George Binkley – strings
- Harold Bradley – guitar
- David Briggs – keyboards
- Martin Chantry – strings
- Roy Christensen – strings
- Ray Edenton – guitar
- Gregg Galbraith – dobro, guitar
- Sonny Garrish – steel guitar, dobro
- Jimmy Gateley – fiddle
- Carol Gorodetzsky – strings

- The Holladays – background vocals
- The Jordanaires – background vocals
- Martin Katahn – strings
- Sheldon Kurland – strings
- Billy Linneman – bass
- Bill McElhiney – arrangement
- Bob Moore – bass
- Doug Renaud – drums
- Samuel Terranova – strings
- Gary Vanosdale – strings
- Woody Woodard – keyboards
- Stephanie Woolf – strings

Technical personnel

- Owen Bradley – record producer

== Chart performance ==
Chart (1975)	Peak position
US Top Country Albums (Billboard)	22

== Release history ==
Region	Date	Format	Label	Ref.
Australia	January 1975	Vinyl	MCA	
United States	January 1975	Vinyl	MCA	
