= "Whispering" Bill Anderson =

Studio album by Bill Anderson
- Released: June 1974
- Recorded: March 1974
- Studios: Bradley's Barn, Mount Juliet, Tennessee
- Genre: Country
- Length: Owen Bradley
- Producer: MCA Records

Bill Anderson chronology
| Bill (1973) | "Whispering" Bill Anderson (1974) | Every Time I Turn the Radio On/Talk to Me Ohio (1975) |

Singles from "Whispering" Bill Anderson
- 1. "Can I Come Home to You" Released: 1974

"Whispering" Bill Anderson is a studio album by American country singer-songwriter Bill Anderson. It was released in June 1974 on MCA Records and was produced by Owen Bradley. The album's only single was the track "Can I Come Home to You". It was also his twenty-second studio recording and only album issued in 1974.

== Background and content ==
"Whispering" Bill Anderson was recorded in March 1974 at Bradley's Barn, a studio located in Mount Juliet, Tennessee owned by the album's producer Owen Bradley, Anderson's longtime musical collaborator. It was Anderson's twenty second album project and the twenty second to be recorded with Bradley. The album's title was derived from a nickname given to Anderson early in his career. The title was given to him because of the "whisper" quality of his singing voice. The album consisted of 11 tracks. Seven of the album's songs were written co-written by Anderson himself. The additional four track were written by others. The track, "Country Song", was written by Jack Clement, a Nashville music producer. The opening track, "Can I Come Home to You", was co-written by Jan Crutchfield and producer Buddy Killen.

== Release and reception ==
"Whispering" Bill Anderson was released in June 1974 on MCA Records, his twenty-second studio recording. The album was issued as a vinyl LP record, with six songs on side one and five songs on side two of the record. The project peaked at number 17 on the Billboard Top Country Albums in September 1974. The album included one single, "Can I Come Home to You". Released in 1974, the song peaked at number 24 on the Billboard Hot Country Singles chart after spending 14 weeks on the chart. The project received a positive response from Billboard in June 1974. "Again, a great collection of material sung in the Anderson style which puts him consistently at the top. It's a great variety of songs, including a little recitation, some fine ballads, an up-tempo tune or two, and real class," staff writers commented.

== Track listing ==
All tracks written by Bill Anderson, except where noted.

Side one
| No. | Title | Writer(s) | Length |
|---|---|---|---|
| 1. | "Can I Come Home to You" | Jerry Crutchfield; Buddy Killen | 2:48 |
| 2. | "Gettin' to Know You" | | 2:36 |
| 3. | "A Country Song" | Jack Clement | 3:17 |
| 4. | "As Much as I Love You" | | 2:39 |
| 5. | "I'm Happily Married (And Playing to Stay That Way)" | | 2:54 |
| 6. | "Proof" | Buzz Rabin; Jimmy Sadd | 2:57 |

Side two
| No. | Title | Writer(s) | Length |
|---|---|---|---|
| 1. | "Mercy" | | 2:11 |
| 2. | "We Made Love (But Where's the Love We Made)" | Anderson; Becki Anderson | 2:34 |
| 3. | "It's Just Gonna Take Some Time Getting Used To" | | 2:47 |
| 4. | "The Best It's Ever Been" | | 2:58 |
| 5. | "Mama's Face" | Glenn Martin | 2:47 |

== Personnel ==
All credits are adapted from the liner notes of "Whispering" Bill Anderson.

- Bill Anderson – lead vocals
- Hal Bauksbaum – photography
- Owen Bradley – record producer

== Chart performance ==
| Chart (1974) | Peak position |
|---|---|
| US Top Country Albums (Billboard) | 17 |

== Release history ==
| Region | Date | Format | Label | Ref. |
|---|---|---|---|---|
| Canada | July 1973 | Vinyl | MCA | |
| United States | July 1973 | Vinyl | MCA | |
