= Mary Lou Turner =

American singer-songwriter

- Born: June 13, 1947 (age 79)
- Origin: Hazard, Kentucky, U.S.
- Occupation: Singer
- Instrument: Vocals
- Years active: 1974–1980
- Label: MCA

Mary Lou Turner (born June 13, 1947) is an American country music artist. She began her career as a regular on the Wheeling Jamboree in the early 1970s and in 1974 signed to replace Jan Howard as the "girl singer" (who had left to pursue her solo career full-time) on The Bill Anderson Show, both his touring show and syndicated TV series. Between 1976 and 1977 she recorded two duet albums with Bill Anderson, and charted four duets with him. One of their duets, "Sometimes", reached No. 1 in 1976. Turner also charted two solo Top 40 country singles in 1976, and several more solo singles.

== Discography ==
=== Albums ===
Both albums recorded with Bill Anderson.

Year	Album	Chart Positions	Label
Year	Album	US Country	Label
1976	Sometimes	6	MCA
1977	Billy Boy & Mary Lou	39	MCA

=== Solo singles ===
Year	Single	Peak positions
Year	Single	US Country
1974	"All That Keeps Me Goin'"	94
1975	"Come On Home"	85
1976	"It's Different with You"	25
1976	"Love It Away"	30
1977	"Cheatin' Overtime"	41
1977	"The Man Still Turns Me On"	93
1977	"He Picked Me Up When You Let Me Down"	73
1979	"Yours and Mine"	78
1979	"Caught with My Feelings Down" / "You Can't Remember and I Can't Forget"	81
1980	"I Wanna Love You Tonight"	91

=== Duets with Bill Anderson ===
Year	Single	Peak positions		Album
Year	Single	US Country	CAN Country	Album
1976	"Sometimes"	1	3	Sometimes
1976	"That's What Made Me Love You"	7	2	Sometimes
1977	"Where Are You Going, Billy Boy"	18	22	Billy Boy and Mary Lou
1978	"I'm Way Ahead of You"	25	30	Billy Boy and Mary Lou
