= Sometimes (Bill Anderson and Mary Lou Turner album) =

Studio album by Bill Anderson and Mary Lou Turner
- Released: January 1976
- Recorded: September 1975
- Studios: Bradley's Barn, Mount Juliet, Tennessee
- Genres: Country; Countrypolitan
- Label: MCA
- Producer: Owen Bradley

Bill Anderson chronology
| Live from London (1975) | Sometimes (1976) | Peanuts and Diamonds and Other Jewels (1976) |

Mary Lou Turner chronology
| Sometimes (1976) | Billy Boy and Mary Lou (1977) |

Singles from Sometimes
- 1. "Sometimes" Released: November 1975; 2. "That's What Made Me Love You" Released: April 1976

Sometimes is a studio album by American country music artists Bill Anderson and Mary Lou Turner. It was released in January 1976 on MCA Records and was produced by Owen Bradley. It was Anderson's twenty fourth studio recording and Turner's first. The album's title track became a major hit on the country charts in both the United States and Canada. The album also reached major positions on the country chart in the United States. Sometimes was the first collaborative project between Anderson and Turner. Anderson hired Turner to work as his duet partner during this period and the project was one of two recordings they made.

== Background and content ==
Sometimes was recorded in September 1975 at Bradley's Barn studio in Mount Juliet, Tennessee. The sessions were produced by the studio's owner, Owen Bradley, Anderson's long-time producer on the label. The album was Anderson's first collaboration album with Mary Lou Turner. It was Turner who replaced his previous collaborator, Jan Howard, on his syndicated television and road show. The album consisted of ten tracks. Four of the album's tracks were written by Anderson, including the title track. Some of the other tracks were cover versions of songs recorded by other artists. Among these covers was "Gone at Last", a song first recorded as a duet by Paul Simon and Phoebe Snow.

== Release and chart performance ==
Sometimes was released in January 1976 on MCA Records. The album was issued as a vinyl record, with five songs on side one and five songs on side two. The album spent 22 weeks on the Billboard Top Country Albums before peaking at number six in April 1976. It was one of ten albums in Anderson's career to reach the top ten of the Billboard country albums list. The first single released from the album was the title track in November 1975. In February 1976, the single reached number one on the Billboard Hot Country Singles chart. The single also reached number three on the RPM Country Singles chart in Canada around the same time. The second single issued was the song "That's What Made Me Love You" in April 1976. The song reached number seven on the Billboard country songs chart and number two on the Canadian country singles chart.

== Track listing ==
Side one
| No. | Title | Writer(s) | Length |
|---|---|---|---|
| 1. | "Sometimes" | Bill Anderson | 2:52 |
| 2. | "Circle in a Triangle" | Bobbie Carroll; Orville Couch | 2:38 |
| 3. | "Gone at Last" | Paul Simon | 3:31 |
| 4. | "Come Walk with Me" | Steve Karliski | 3:15 |
| 5. | "Can We Still Be Friends" | Anderson | 2:49 |

Side two
| No. | Title | Writer(s) | Length |
|---|---|---|---|
| 1. | "That's What Made Me Love You" | Lawrence Shoberg | 2:46 |
| 2. | "Without You" | Anderson | 2:29 |
| 3. | "Charlie, Mary and Us" | Espie "Slim" Haven | 2:37 |
| 4. | "I Can't Sleep with You" | Michael Kosser; Steve Pippin | 2:48 |
| 5. | "Let Me Take You Away" | Anderson | 2:51 |

== Personnel ==
All credits are adapted from the liner notes of Sometimes.

Musical personnel

- Bill Anderson – lead vocals
- Harold Bradley – guitar
- David Briggs – piano
- Carol Lee Cooper – background vocals
- Gregg Galbraith – guitar, dobro
- Buddy Harman – drums
- Victor Jordan – banjo
- Dave Kirby – guitar
- Kenny Malone – drums
- Bob Moore – bass
- Mary Lou Turner – lead vocals
- L.E. White – background vocals
- Jimmy Woodward – piano

Technical personnel

- Owen Bradley – producer

== Charts ==
=== Weekly charts ===
| Chart (1976) | Peak position |
|---|---|
| US Top Country Albums (Billboard) | 6 |

=== Year-end charts ===
| Chart (1976) | Position |
|---|---|
| US Top Country Albums (Billboard) | 25 |

== Release history ==
| Region | Date | Format | Label | Ref. |
|---|---|---|---|---|
| Canada | January 1976 | Vinyl | MCA | |
| United States | January 1976 | Vinyl | MCA | |
