= World of Make Believe =

Single by Bill Anderson

from the album Bill
- B-side: "Gonna Shine It On Again"
- Released: November 19, 1973
- Genre: Country
- Label: MCA
- Songwriters: Pee Wee Maddux; Mario Carpenter; Pete McCord
- Producer: Owen Bradley

Bill Anderson singles chronology
"The Corner of My Life" (1973)	"World of Make Believe" (1973)	"Can I Come Home to You" (1974)

"World of Make Believe" is a 1973 single by Bill Anderson. "World of Make Believe" was Bill Anderson's last number one as a solo artist. The single stayed at number one for a single week and spent a total of twelve weeks on the country chart. An earlier version of the song is credited to Battiste (Kevin 104, released in 1962, from Mobile, Alabama). A fourth composer, "Smith" (no first name given) is also credited on the label. The original version was probably from 1959 or earlier, when the song was recorded in 1959 by Willie Loftin & the Discords and by Johnny Bragg. Like Battiste, Loftin's record label, Smoke, is from Mobile, Alabama. The Bragg version was on Decca. Both Loftin and Bragg are/were African-American. Smoke Records was distributed by Sandy Records, the Mobile-based label which had hits by Travis & Bob ("Tell Him No," "Lovers' Rendezvous"). The song may date back to 1956.

== Chart performance ==
Chart (1973–1974)	Peak position
U.S. Billboard Hot Country Singles	1
Canadian RPM Country Tracks	1
