= I Can't Wait Any Longer =

Single by Bill Anderson

from the album Love...& Other Sad Stories
- B-side: "Joanna"
- Released: April 1978
- Genre: Country, disco
- Label: MCA
- Songwriters: Bill Anderson; Buddy Killen

Bill Anderson singles chronology
"Still the One" (1977)	"I Can't Wait Any Longer" (1978)	"Double S" (1978)

"I Can't Wait Any Longer" is a single by American country music artist Bill Anderson. Released in April 1978, it was the first single from his album Love and Other Sad Stories. The song peaked at number 4 on the Billboard Hot Country Singles chart. It also reached number 1 on the RPM Country Tracks chart in Canada.

Blending country and disco, it was Anderson's fifth and final Hot 100 hit.

== Charts ==
=== Weekly charts ===
Chart (1978)	Peak position
US Billboard Hot 100	80
US Hot Country Songs (Billboard)	4
Canadian RPM Country Tracks	1
Canadian RPM Top Singles	99

=== Year-end charts ===
Chart (1978)	Position
US Hot Country Songs (Billboard)	50
