= Po' Folks =

Po' Folks may refer to:

- "Po' Folks" (Bill Anderson song), 1961
- "Po' Folks" (Nappy Roots song), 2001
- Po' Folks (restaurant), a defunct American restaurant chain named after the Bill Anderson song
