= Whisperin' Bluegrass =

Studio album by Bill Anderson
- Released: October 23, 2007
- Studio: IMI Studio
- Genres: Country; bluegrass
- Length: 54:14
- Label: Madacy
- Producer: Steve Ivey

Bill Anderson chronology
The Way I Feel (2005)	Whisperin' Bluegrass (2007)	Songwriter (2010)

Whisperin' Bluegrass is a studio album by American country singer-songwriter Bill Anderson. It was released on October 23, 2007 via Madacy Entertainment and was produced by Steve Ivey. The project was Anderson's 41st studio recording in his career and his first album containing bluegrass music. A total of 16 tracks were included on the project, many of which were covers of songs previously recorded by others. It received positive reviews upon its release.

== Background and content ==
Whisperin' Bluegrass began as a project to bring back a more traditional style of country music. According to Anderson, bluegrass reminded him of the more traditional country he grew up listening to. "A lot of these young kids are learning to play guitars and mandolins. They’re bringing a whole new interest to the genre. Mainstream country music has drifted pretty far from the shore, and bluegrass music is somewhat of an alternative," Anderson commented. Whisperin' Bluegrass was recorded at the IMI Studio, located in Nashville, Tennessee. It was produced by Steve Ivey, making the album Anderson's first to be produced by Ivey.

The album was a collection of 16 tracks. Half of the songs recorded for project were cover versions of hymns first recorded in a gospel style. Eight of the other tracks were written by Anderson. Several of the album's tracks were duets Anderson recorded with other country artists. Duets are included with Vince Gill, Willie Nelson, Dolly Parton and Jon Randall. Jan Howard was another featured duet partner on the project. Howard was Anderson's longtime collaborator during his years recording for Decca Records.

== Release and reception ==
Professional ratings
Review scores
Source	Rating
The Augusta Chronicle	Favorable
CMT	Favorable
Country Standard Time	Favorable

Whisperin' Bluegrass was released on October 23, 2007 on the Madacy Entertainment label. It was issued as a compact disc and a music download. The album did not chart on any publication at the time of its release, including Billboard.

The album received positive reviews upon its original release. C. Eric Banister of Country Standard Time gave the effort a favorable response in 2007, highlighting the album's three new tracks and his vocal duets. Chet Flippo of Country Music Television called Whisperin' Bluegrass "a terrific album of country and gospel songs done up with bluegrass instrumentation." Don Rhodes of The Augusta Chronicle also gave the album critical acclaim. Rhodes noted that the project's instrumentation was "perfection" and the voices on the record were "so pure" and "so real". "The songs are some of the best in country, bluegrass and gospel music," Rhodes concluded.

== Track listing ==
Whisperin' Bluegrass (2007)
No.	Title	Writer(s)	Length
1.	"Slippin' Away" (featuring Vince Gill)	Bill Anderson	2:35
2.	"My Perfect Reason" (featuring Dolly Parton)	Anderson; Clint Daniels	4:09
3.	"I've Got a Thing About a Five String"	Anderson	5:04
4.	"The Cold Hard Facts of Life"	Anderson	3:47
5.	"Everything I Want (And Not a Thing a I Need)" (featuring Jon Randall)	Anderson; Randall	3:13
6.	"Give It Away"	Anderson; Buddy Cannon; Jamey Johnson	3:22
7.	"I Never Once Stopped Loving You"	Anderson; Jan Howard	3:22
8.	"The Lord Knows I'm Drinking" (featuring Willie Nelson)	Anderson	3:18
9.	"He's Got the Whole World in His Hands" (featuring Jan Howard)	Traditional	3:29
10.	"Leaning on the Everlasting Arms"	Elisha Hoffman; Anthony J. Showalter	2:56
11.	"I'll Be Somewhere Listening"	Traditional	3:30
12.	"In the Garden"	C. Austin Miles	3:48
13.	"Using My Bible for a Roadmap"	Traditional	2:24
14.	"I Love to Tell the Story"	Katherine Hankey	3:25
15.	"If I Could Hear My Mother Pray Again"	John Whitfield "Whit" Vaughan	2:49
16.	"Amazing Grace"	Traditional	3:03
Total length:			54:14

== Personnel ==
All credits are adapted from the liner notes of Whisperin' Bluegrass and Allmusic.

Musical personnel

- Bill Anderson – lead vocals
- Charlie Chadwick – upright bass
- Vince Gill – guest artist
- Jan Howard – guest artist
- Rob Ickes – dobro
- Steve Ivey – background vocals, acoustic guitar, keyboards, piano
- Andy Leftwich – fiddle, mandolin
- Willie Nelson – guest artist
- Dolly Parton – guest artist
- Jon Randall – guest artist
- Keith Sewell – background vocals
- Lester Earl Singer – acoustic guitar
- Mike Toppins – acoustic guitar, banjo, dobro

Technical personnel

- Steve Ivey – engineering, mixing, producer
- Mike Toppins – production assistant

== Release history ==
Region	Date	Format	Label	Ref.
United States	October 23, 2007	Compact disc; music download	Madacy Entertainment	
