= Softly & Tenderly =

Softly and Tenderly

Studio album by Bill Anderson
- Released: June 1, 2004
- Genres: Country; gospel
- Length: 37:37
- Labels: Madacy; TWI
- Producers: Bill Anderson; Mike Toppins

Bill Anderson chronology
No Place Like Home on Christmas (2002)	Softly and Tenderly (2004)	The Way I Feel (2005)

Softly and Tenderly is a studio album by American country music singer-songwriter Bill Anderson. It was released on June 1, 2005, on Madacy Entertainment and TWI Records. The album was Anderson's 39th studio recording and was his third album collection of gospel music.

== Background, content and release ==
Softly & Tenderly was Anderson's third collection of gospel recordings. His first album was released in 1968 titled I Can Do Nothing Alone. Anderson recorded the title track of the latter album for his 2005 collection. He spoke of his decision to record a new gospel project in 2005. "I was going into the studio last winter to do a new country record, and Jack Johnson came to me and said, 'We've gotten quite a few calls out in the marketplace for some country gospel'," he recalled. The album consisted of 11 tracks. Many of the songs included on the project were covers of popular gospel and Christian songs. This included "Love Lifted Me", "I Saw the Light" and "Life's Railway to Heaven".

Softly & Tenderly was released on June 1, 2004, via TWI Records. The latter label was Anderson's own recording company, which issued the album on a compact disc. The album was later licensed through Madacy Entertainment. The album was sold at major retailers including Wal-Mart and Target. The album did not chart on any publication at the time of its release, including Billboard. In his review, Allmusic's Steve Leggett gave the album three out of five possible stars. "He's done a little of everything, including gospel, as this brief set shows, featuring Anderson's gentle vocal style on several country gospel classics like 'The Old Rugged Cross,' 'I Saw the Light,' 'Life's Railway to Heaven,' and 'Farther Along.'

== Track listing ==
Softly & Tenderly (2004)
No.	Title	Writer(s)	Length
1.	"Will the Circle Be Unbroken?"	Charles H. Gabriel; Ada R. Habershon	3:20
2.	"Softly and Tenderly"	Will L. Thompson	3:32
3.	"The Old Rugged Cross"	George Bennard	3:20
4.	"I Saw the Light"	Hank Williams	2:41
5.	"I Can Do Nothing Alone"	Bill Anderson	3:37
6.	"Life's Railway to Heaven"	Charles Davis Tillman	3:46
7.	"Sweet Hour of Prayer"	William Batchelder Bradbury	3:34
8.	"Where Could I Go But to the Lord?"	James B. Coats	3:00
9.	"Farther Along"	Traditional	4:14
10.	"Somebody Touched Me/This Little Light of Mine/Do Lord"	Various	3:18
11.	"Love Lifted Me"	Traditional	3:15

== Personnel ==
All credits are adapted from Allmusic.

Musical and technical personnel

- Bill Anderson – lead vocals, producer
- Eva Liranzo – cover design
- Mike Toppins – producer

== Release history ==
Region	Date	Format	Label	Ref.
United States	June 1, 2004	Compact disc	Madacy Entertainment; TWI Records	
