= Yesterday, Today, and Tomorrow (Bill Anderson album) =

Studio album by Bill Anderson
- Released: 1984
- Genre: Country
- Label: Swanee
- Producer: Walter Haynes

Bill Anderson chronology
Southern Fried (1983)	Yesterday, Today, and Tomorrow (1984)	A Place in the Country (1986)

Yesterday, Today, and Tomorrow is a 1984 country double album by Bill Anderson. The album produced three charting singles: "Wino the Clown" (#58), "Pity Party" (#62) and "When You Leave That Way You Can Never Go Back" (#75).

== Track listing ==
=== New Hits ===
1. "Pity Party" (Bill Anderson) 3:15
2. "This Is the Goodbye (To End All Goodbyes)" (Anderson) 3:23
3. "Wino the Clown" (Curly Putman, Ron Hellard, Bucky Jones) 3:56
4. "I Never Lie to Ruby" (Hellard, Jones) 3:19
5. "Country Music Died Today" (Anderson) 3:25
6. "When You Leave That Way (You Can Never Go Back)" (Steve Clark, Johnny MacRae) 3:45
7. "With Her" (Anderson) 2:42
8. "Lorene" (Anderson) 3:04
9. "Second Thoughts" (Anderson) 2:31
10. "The Years Fall Away" (Anderson) 3:20

=== Past Hits ===
1. "Don't She Look Good" (Anderson) 2:07
2. "Still" (Anderson) 2:49
3. "Double S" (Anderson, Buddy Killen) 4:30
4. "Wild Week-End" (Anderson) 2:20
5. "Mama Sang a Song" (Anderson) 3:27
6. "Quits" (Anderson) 2:26
7. "Golden Guitar" (Billy Gray, Curtis Leach) 4:04
8. "Po' Folks" (Anderson) 2:56
9. "Five Little Fingers" (Anderson) 3:12
10. "I Love You Drops" (Anderson) 2:36

== Personnel ==
- Guitar: Weldon Myrick, Dale Sellers, Les Singer. Steel Guitar: Mike Johnson
- Bass: Mark Johnson, Joe Osborn
- Keyboards: David Briggs, Dirk Johnson, Bobby Ogdin
- Drums: Eddie Bayers, Jerry Carrigan, Mike Streeter, Stephen William Turner
- Fiddle: Buddy Spicher
- Backing Vocals: Arlene Harden, Bobby Harden, Leann Steinhauer, Liana Manis,
  Lisa Silver, Mark Streeter, Curtis Young
