= Bill Anderson Sings Country Heart Songs =

Compilation album by Bill Anderson
- Released: January 1962
- Recorded: 1959–1961
- Studio: Bradley Studio
- Genre: Country; Nashville Sound
- Length: 31:59
- Label: Decca
- Producer: Owen Bradley

Bill Anderson chronology
| Bill Anderson Sings Country Heart Songs (1962) | Still (1963) |

Singles from Bill Anderson Sings Country Heart Songs
- 1. "Mama Sang a Song" Released: July 1962

Bill Anderson Sings Country Heart Songs is a compilation album by American country singer-songwriter Bill Anderson. It was released in January 1962 on Decca Records and was produced by Owen Bradley. Despite it being a compilation, the project was Anderson's debut album release as a recording artist. It featured several of his early hits with the Decca label and included one song that would later be issued as a single in 1962.

== Background, content and release ==
Bill Anderson Sings Country Heart Songs included tracks Anderson recorded during his early years with the Decca label. These sessions were recorded between 1959 and 1961. They were produced by Owen Bradley, who would serve as Anderson's production collaborator for much of his career at the label. The recording sessions took place at the Bradley Studio located in Nashville, Tennessee. The sessions featured The Nashville A-Team as the backing band.

The album consisted of twelve tracks, most of which had been previously released. Six of the album's tracks were composed by Anderson himself. This included the tune "City Lights," which was recorded by Ray Price and elevated Anderson's career. Also included is Anderson's early hits for the Decca label, such as "Po' Folks," "Walk Out Backwards" and "The Tip of My Fingers."

Country Heart Songs was released in January 1962 on Decca Records, becoming Anderson's first album released in his career. It was issued as a vinyl LP, containing six songs on each side of the record. Unlike many of his later releases, the record did not chart on any Billboard list including the country albums chart. The album's track, "Mama Sang a Song," would later be spawned as the project's only single release in July 1962. The song went on to become Anderson's first number one hit on the Billboard Hot Country Singles chart, reaching the position in October 1962. The album later received critical reception by Allmusic, which gave the project 4.5 out of 5 stars.

== Track listing ==
Side one

1. "Po' Folks" – (Bill Anderson)
2. "City Lights" – (Anderson)
3. "As Long as I Live" – (Roy Acuff)
4. "Blue Eyes Crying in the Rain" – (Fred Rose)
5. "It Takes a Worried Man" – (traditional)
6. "Mama Sang a Song" – (Anderson)

Side two

1. "Walk Out Backwards" – (Anderson)
2. "Wedding Bells" – (Claude Boone)
3. "Columbus Stockade Blues" – (traditional)
4. "Ninety-Nine" – (Anderson)
5. "The Tip of My Fingers" – (Anderson)
6. "Yonder Comes a Sucker" – (Jim Reeves)

== Personnel ==
All credits are adapted from the liner notes of Bill Anderson Sings Country Heart Songs.

Musical personnel

- Bill Anderson – lead vocals
- Owen Bradley – organ
- Harold Bradley – banjo, guitar
- Floyd Cramer – piano, vibes
- Jimmy Day – steel guitar
- Pete Drake – steel guitar
- Hank Garland – guitar
- Buddy Harman – drums
- Tommy Jackson – fiddle
- Buddy Killen – background vocals
- Morris Palter – drums
- Johnny Paycheck – background vocals
- Jimmy Riddle – harmonica
- Floyd Robinson – background vocals
- The Anita Kerr Singers – background vocals

Technical personnel

- Owen Bradley – producer

== Release history ==
| Region | Date | Format | Label | Ref. |
|---|---|---|---|---|
| United States | January 1962 | Vinyl | Decca Records | |
