= No Place Like Home on Christmas =

Studio album by Bill Anderson
- Released: October 15, 2002
- Studio: Chicken Trax Production
- Genres: Country; Christmas
- Length: 38:42
- Label: Varèse Sarabande
- Producers: Bill Anderson; Mike Toppins

Bill Anderson chronology
A Lot of Things Different (2001)	No Place Like Home on Christmas (2002)	Softly & Tenderly (2004)

No Place Like Home on Christmas is a studio album by American country singer-songwriter Bill Anderson. It was released on October 15, 2002, via Varèse Sarabande. The project was co-produced by both Anderson and Mike Toppins. It was Anderson's second album of holiday music released during his career. The album consisted of 12 tracks, all of which were new recordings or re-recordings.

== Background, content and release ==
No Place Like Home on Christmas was recorded at the Chicken Trax Production Studio in Nashville, Tennessee. The album was co-produced by Anderson and Mike Toppins. It was his second album of Christmas music released during his career. Anderson's first was 1969's Christmas. Some of the tracks from that album were re-recorded again for Anderson's 2002 release.

The album consisted of 12 tracks. Half of the album's tracks were written by Anderson, including the title track, which was co-composed with Steve Wariner. The remaining tracks are cover versions of holiday and Christmas songs. Among the covers is Anderson's own "Po' Folks Christmas," which he first recorded in the 1960s. Additional cover songs include "Silver Bells" and "Blue Christmas".

No Place Like Home on Christmas was released on October 15, 2002, via Varèse Sarabande. It was offered as a compact disc upon its original release. It was later releases to digital retailers in the 2010s. Like his previous releases, No Place Like Home on Christmas failed to make appearances on any Billboard album charts, most notably the Top Country Albums chart.

== Track listing ==
No Place Like Home on Christmas (2002)
No.	Title	Writer(s)	Length
1.	"Christmas Time's A-Comin'"	Tex Logan	2:23
2.	"Blue Christmas"	Bill Hayes; Jay W. Johnson	3:03
3.	"Joy to the World"	Lowell Mason; Isaac Watts	3:54
4.	"Santa Claus Is Coming to Town"	J. Fred Coots; Haven Gillespie	2:40
5.	"Silver Bells"	Ray Evans; Jay Livingston	3:37
6.	"Po' Folks Christmas"	Anderson	3:38
7.	"My Christmas List Grows Shorter Every Year"	Anderson	3:52
8.	"Christmas Story" ("O Holy Night" / "Away in a Manger")	Anderson	2:56
9.	"Across the Miles at Christmas"	Anderson	2:55
10.	"No Place Like Home on Christmas"	Boudleaux Bryant	2:54
11.	"Christmas in Your Arms"	Anderson; Steve Wariner	3:44
12.	"One Solitary Life (Silent Night)"	Anderson	3:06

== Personnel ==
All credits are adapted from Allmusic and the liner notes of No Place Like Home on Christmas.

Musical personnel

- Bill Anderson – lead vocals
- Donna Hammitt – steel guitar
- Jan Howard – background vocals
- Robert Payne – drums, percussion
- Julianna Raye – background vocals
- Lester Earl Singer – acoustic guitar, banjo, dobro, electric guitar
- Eddie Stubbs – fiddle
- Mike Toppins – acoustic guitar, background vocals, dobro, electric guitar, gut string guitar, mandolin, steel guitar
- Todd Wright – autoharp, hammer dulcimer

Technical personnel

- Bill Anderson – producer
- Valorie Cole – make-up
- Bill Pitzonka – art direction, design
- Mike Toppins – engineering, mixing, producer

== Release history ==
Region	Date	Format	Label	Ref.
United States	October 15, 2002	Compact disc	Varèse Sarabande	
United States	2010s	Music download	Varèse Sarabande	
