= Bill Anderson =

American singer-songwriter (born 1937)

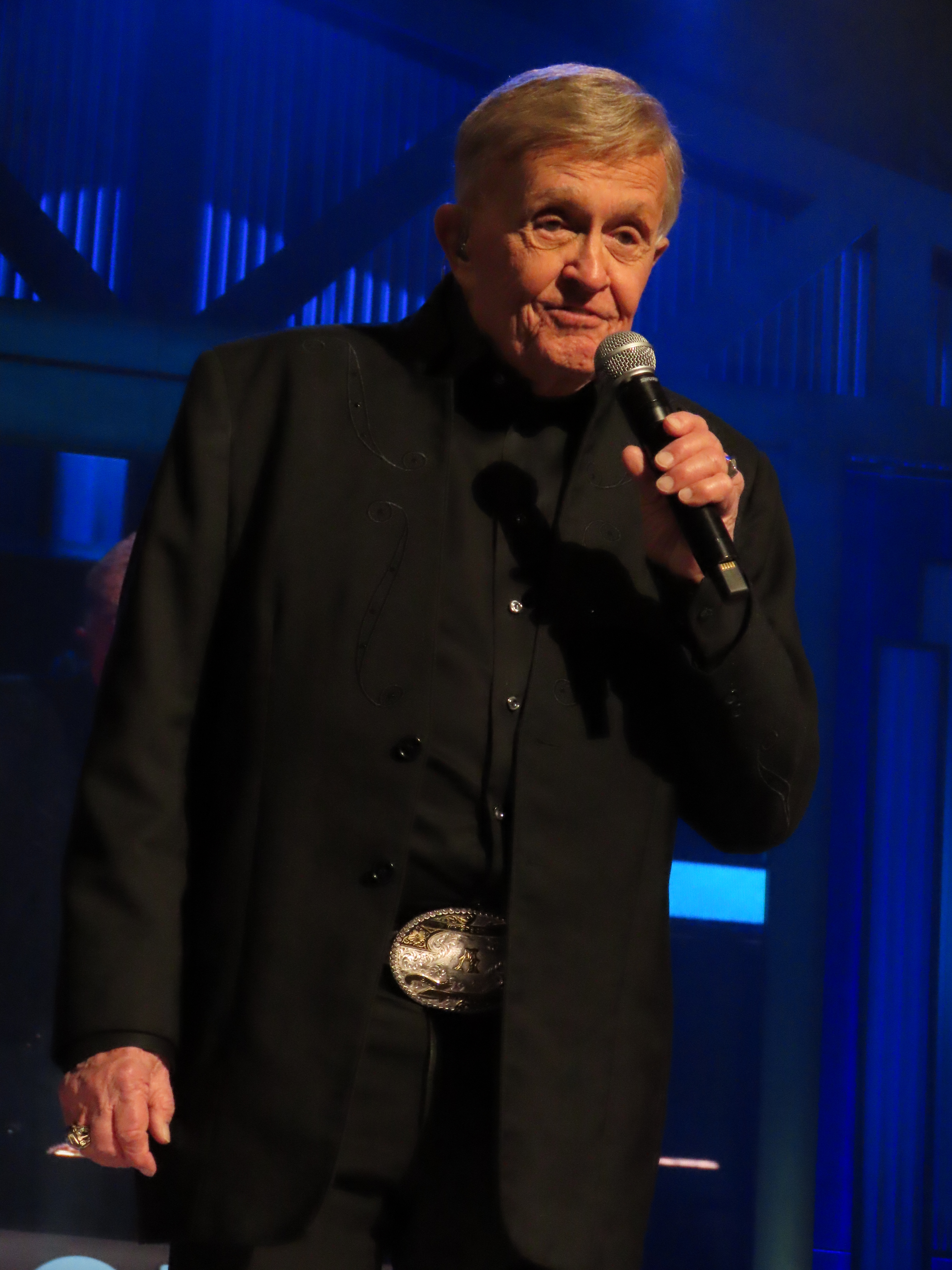
- Anderson in 2022
- Born: James William Anderson III; November 1, 1937 (age 89); Columbia, South Carolina, U.S.
- Education: University of Georgia
- Occupations: Singer; songwriter; television host
- Years active: 1957–present
- Spouses: Bette Rhodes (m. 1959; div. 1969); Becky Davis (m. 1970; div. 1997)
- Partner: Vickie Salas (2008–died 2019)
- Children: 3
- Musical career
- Genres: Country; Nashville Sound; bluegrass; gospel
- Labels: Decca/MCA; Southern Tracks; Swanee; Po' Folks; Curb; Warner Bros.; Varèse Sarabande; Madacy; TWI
- Website: billanderson.com

James William Anderson III (born November 1, 1937) is an American country music singer, songwriter, and television host. His soft-spoken singing voice earned him the nickname "Whispering Bill" from music critics and writers. As a songwriter, his compositions have been covered by various music artists since the late 1950s.

Anderson was raised in Decatur, Georgia, and began composing songs while in high school. While in college, he wrote the song "City Lights", which became a major hit for Ray Price in 1958. His songwriting led to his first recording contract with Decca Records that year; shortly afterward, Anderson began to have major hits. In 1963, he released his most successful single, "Still". The song became a major country/pop crossover hit and was followed by a series of top-10 hits. These songs included "I Love You Drops", "I Get the Fever", and "Wild Week-End". His songs were being notably recorded by other artists. In 1964, Connie Smith had her first major hit with his composition "Once a Day". In 1971, Cal Smith had a number-one single with Anderson's "The Lord Knows I'm Drinking".

In the 1970s, Anderson continued having major hits as a recording artist, as well. Songs including "Love Is a Sometimes Thing" and "All the Lonely Women in the World" became major hits. As the decade progressed, his style moved towards the polished countrypolitan genre of country music, with songs such as "I Can't Wait Any Longer". He was dropped from his record label in the early 1980s and began a brief career in television, which included hosting the game shows The Better Sex and Fandango. Anderson began writing songs again in the early 1990s for the next generation of country performers. Collaborating with other writers, he wrote material that went on to become hits for Vince Gill, George Strait, Kenny Chesney, and Steve Wariner in the next two decades.

Anderson also continued to record into the 1990s. In 1998, he released his first major label album in over a decade, titled Fine Wine. He continued to release music through his own TWI record label, including projects of gospel and bluegrass material. His most recent studio album was released in 2020. In his career as both a writer and performer, he has received awards from the Academy of Country Music, Country Music Association, Songwriters Hall of Fame, and the Nashville Songwriters Hall of Fame.

== Early life ==
James William Anderson III was born to Elizabeth and James William Anderson Jr. in Columbia, South Carolina; his sister Elizabeth Anderson was born two years later. Their mother was a homemaker and their father was an insurance agent. He spent his early childhood with his family in Columbia. When he was in third grade, the family moved to his grandparents' home in Griffin, Georgia, and shortly after moved to their own home in Decatur, Georgia, where he attended Avondale High School and spent the remainder of his childhood. In Decatur, his father opened his own insurance agency firm, which he continued to own until his retirement. In his 2016 autobiography, Anderson described his childhood as "average", recalling that he "never went to bed hungry", although the family did not have many material possessions.

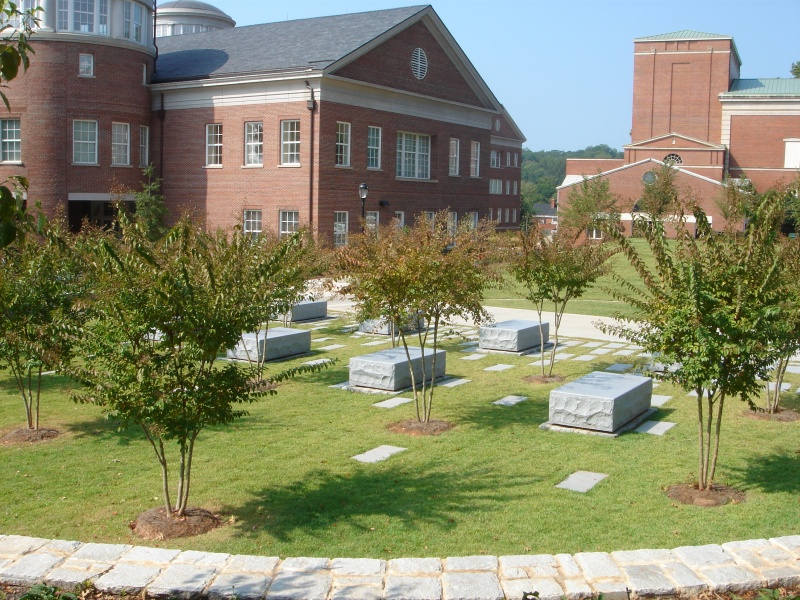
Anderson briefly attended the University of Georgia in the late 1950s, where he studied journalism.

In school, Anderson was active in 4-H organizations and played both baseball and football. He was most interested in music, though, having been inspired by his grandparents, who played instruments. His interest grew further after watching country musicians perform on a radio station, located directly above his father's insurance company. Anderson soon saved enough money to purchase his own guitar. At age 10, he wrote his first song called "Carry Me Home Texas".

In high school, Anderson and his friends formed a band and won a school talent contest. The band began performing around the local area, eventually performing on a local radio as the Avondale Playboys. Anderson's strong interest in baseball continued through high school, as well. He became his high school team's pitcher and was scouted to go to the Chicago Cubs training camp. However, Anderson declined the offer after realizing that his family would be upset if he did not attend college. Upon graduating high school, he enrolled at the University of Georgia and majored in journalism.

Anderson had dabbled with journalism before enrolling in university. While still in high school, he wrote for his school's newspaper and also obtained a job covering sports events for The Atlanta Journal-Constitution. In his freshman year, he pledged the Kappa Sigma fraternity. Several students and he formed a country band called the Classic City Playboys and began playing local events. He also became interested in radio-station work after a DJ friend introduced him to some of the controls. "I thought I was Superman. I knew that night I had to get a job as a disc jockey", he recalled.

Anderson graduated from college in 1959. During his first summer out of college, he got a job working as a rock and roll DJ at WGAU in Athens, Georgia. However, he was fired after playing country records over the air and was then hired at WJJC in Commerce, Georgia. Anderson began songwriting again after obtaining the new position. In Commerce, Anderson wrote the song "City Lights". The song ultimately brought him to Nashville, where both his songwriting and recording careers began.

== Recording career ==
=== 1958–1962: Early success ===
Anderson's recording career began in 1957 after he released two singles on the independent label TNT. Both songs (including his own version of "City Lights") attracted little attention, but the success brought by Ray Price's version of "City Lights" led Anderson to frequent Nashville, Tennessee. In the city, he brought compositions for artists and producers to record. Owen Bradley of Decca Records was impressed by Anderson's writing and signed him to the label as a recording artist. Anderson officially signed with Decca in the summer of 1958. His early Decca singles were entirely self-composed. Anderson's first Decca release in December 1958 was called "That's What It's Like to Be Lonesome". The song became a major hit the following year when it climbed to the number 12 position on the Billboard Hot Country and Western Sides chart. He followed this in 1959 with the top-20 hits "Ninety-Nine" and "Dead or Alive".

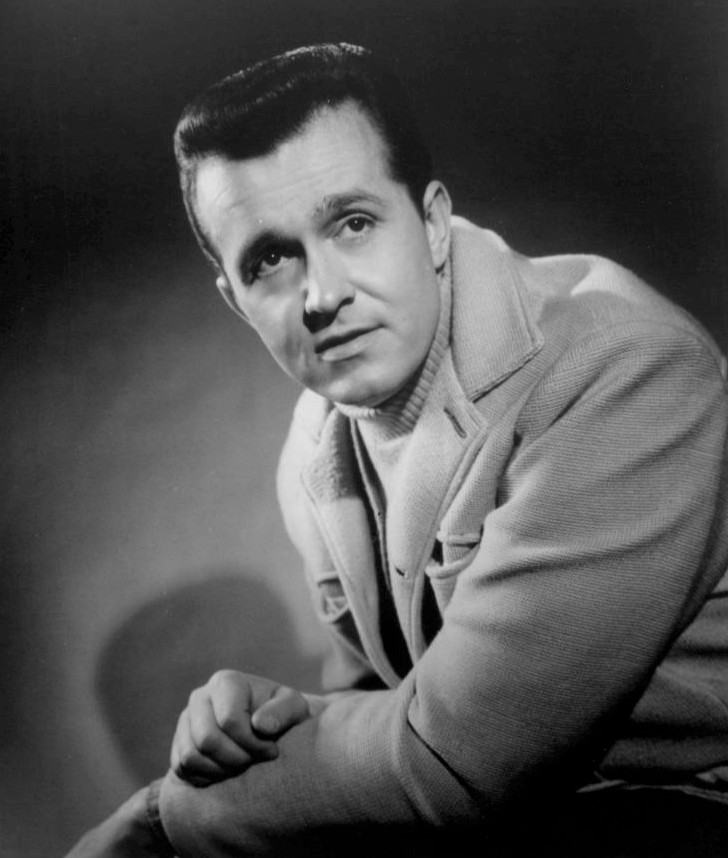
A publicity image of Anderson from his time at Decca Records

In 1960, "The Tip of My Fingers" became his first top-10 hit on the country chart, reaching number seven in August 1960. The song was later recorded and made hits individually by Eddy Arnold, Roy Clark, Jean Shepard, and Steve Wariner. In 1961, the single "Po' Folks" reached number nine on the Billboard country songs chart. The success of "Po' Folks" led Anderson to receive an invitation to join the Grand Ole Opry cast. Anderson accepted and joined the program the same year. This was followed by his first number-one hit, "Mama Sang a Song". It was also his first single to chart on the Billboard Hot 100, reaching number 89. Although successful, Anderson's early singles were not initially included on studio album releases. Instead, Decca issued his early hits on the 1962 compilation Bill Anderson Sings Country Heart Songs.

=== 1963–1976: "Still" and further career success ===
By 1963, Anderson's recording career was expanding. He toured frequently and made public appearances to promote his music. Anderson was inspired to write his 1963 composition, "Still", after encountering an ex-girlfriend while promoting a song. The same night, he wrote the lyrics to the track on an Underwood typewriter at three o'clock in the morning. "Still" became the biggest single of his recording career. In April 1963, it reached number one on the Billboard country and western songs chart. It also became his second single to reach the Billboard Hot 100, but was his first (and only) successful crossover hit there, reaching number eight in June 1963. The track was also his first single to become a hit on the Billboard easy listening chart, reaching number three that June. The song's success led to the 1963 release of Anderson's debut studio album of the same name. The LP reached number 10 on the Billboard country albums chart in January 1964 and the top 40 of the Billboard 200 in late 1963.

"Still" (1963)
Anderson's country-pop crossover hit from 1963 that signified his style as a recording artist and performer

The success of "Still" further elevated Anderson's recording career, including appearances on national television shows such as American Bandstand, where he performed his follow-up crossover hit "8×10". He won awards from several major music publications, including Billboard, Cashbox, and Music Reporter. He scheduled more concert engagements and made as much as $500 per gig. His success led Decca to record and release studio albums with more frequency. These albums were also successful. His second studio LP, Bill Anderson Sings (1964), reached the top 10 of the country albums chart. His 1966 studio release reached number one on the same chart. Album releases were fueled by further hit singles, including "Bright Lights and Country Music", "Five Little Fingers", and "Three A.M." Music writers took notice of Anderson's music success, as well. Billboard magazine called his 1964 album Showcase "a powerful set of performances". Kurt Wolff of the book Country Music: The Rough Guide credited Anderson's success to a "fairly safe and suburban" musical style.

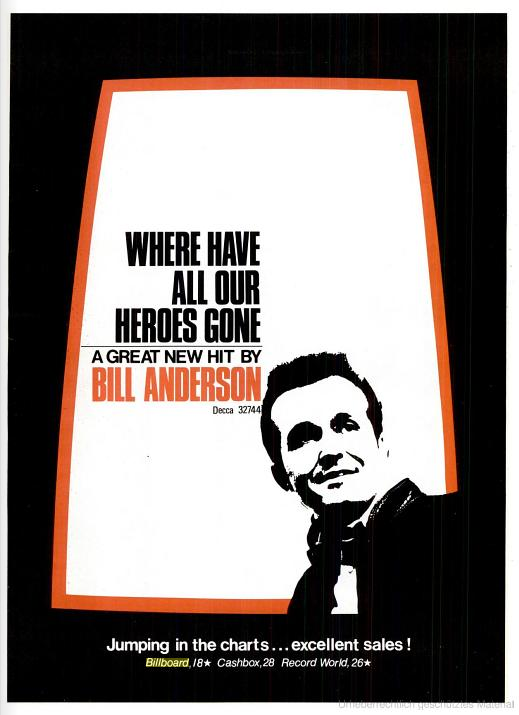
A promotional single for Anderson in Billboard, 1970

His chart hits continued through the 1960s, and many of these songs were self-composed. His 1966 release, "I Love You Drops", was inspired by the Chuck Berry hit "Memphis, Tennessee". His next self-written release also became his third number-one hit, titled "I Get the Fever". He had further top-10 hits with "Get While the Gettin's Good" and "No One's Gonna Hurt You Anymore". During this time, Anderson formed his own touring band, which he named "The Po' Boys" after his 1961 hit. The band frequently received credit on his studio albums and single releases. He also started his own television program, The Bill Anderson Show, which was taped in Canada and Nashville. In the mid-1960s, he began performing duets with country artist Jan Howard, who was also on Decca Records. Believing they could be a successful recording partnership, the pair approached producer Owen Bradley with the idea of recording together. Bradley agreed, and the duo released their first single in 1965. In 1968, the pair had their first major hit with the duet "For Loving You". The song became a number-one hit on the Billboard country chart and led to several more successful collaborations.

Following several more hits, Anderson reached the number-one position for a fifth time in May 1969 with "My Life (Throw It Away If I Want To)". Both this and the hit "But You Know I Love You" were included on his 1969 studio album. He began diversifying his album releases during this period with the recording of a gospel LP, I Can Do Nothing Alone, in 1967 and a holiday LP, Christmas, in 1969. A greatest hits package, Bill Anderson's Greatest Hits, was also issued and it reached number six on the country albums survey. Anderson continued releasing regular country albums as well, putting out as many as three per year by the early 1970s. His country LPs often included a mix of original material and cover versions. On his 1971 release Always Remember, Greg Adams of AllMusic commented that it "confounds expectations" for delivering original vocal performances of songs first cut by Kris Kristofferson and Kenny Rogers. A series of uninterrupted top-10 hits followed his early 1970s albums. During this time frame, Anderson had hits with "Love Is a Sometimes Thing", "Where Have All Our Heroes Gone", "If You Can Live with It (I Can Live Without It)", and "The Corner of My Life". In February 1974, he had his first number-one hit in five years with "World of Make Believe".

=== 1977–1989: Countrypolitan shift and new changes ===
By 1977, Anderson experienced several changes in his recording career. His longtime duet partner, Jan Howard, left his record label and road show, claiming that keeping up with the busy tour schedule had become too difficult. She was replaced by Mary Lou Turner. In 1976, the Turner-Anderson pairing had a number-one hit with the song, "Sometimes". Anderson's longtime label was renamed to MCA Records during the same time frame. Changes at the label continued when his longtime producer Owen Bradley was replaced by Buddy Killen. Anderson's first assignment with Killen was the 1977 studio release, Scorpio. With Killen, Anderson's musical sound shifted from Nashville Sound ballads toward uptempo countrypolitan tunes. The new sound was reflected in his latest albums and singles. In 1977, Anderson had two major hits with the uptempo "Head to Toe" and "Still the One". The following year, Anderson had a major hit with the disco-flavored "I Can't Wait Any Longer". The song peaked at number four on the Billboard country singles chart and reached number 80 on the Hot 100. Its corresponding studio effort, Love...& Other Sad Stories, reached number 37 on the Billboard country albums list.

"I Can't Wait Any Longer" (1978)
Anderson's 1978 uptempo hit that exhibited a new musical shift towards disco. It received mostly criticism from many music writers at the time.

Although successful at first, Anderson's late-1970s music received negative criticism from many writers. Author Kurt Wolff criticized his new image, commenting that his music "flirted dangerously with disco beats". Eugene Chadbourne of Allmusic only gave his Love...& Other Sad Stories album 1.5 out of 5 stars. "This is an album that begins with what sounds like a pervert and ends with an effect described as frightening. Too bad most of it is so boring to listen to", Chadbourne concluded. Anderson's sales success began to decline following the release of "I Can't Wait Any Longer". His follow-up album, Ladies Choice (1979), only reached number 44 on the country albums chart. The album's only major hit was the top-20 single "This Is a Love Song". After the release of his final MCA album in 1980, he was dropped from the label.

In the mid 1980s, Anderson shifted his professional interests. He began a brief television career in California, and he continued recording music sporadically during the decade. On the independent Southern Tracks label, he released Southern Fried in 1983, co-producing it with musician Mike Johnson. The album spawned four singles that became minor hits on the country songs chart, including the title track. In 1986, Anderson released A Place in the Country, which was also produced by Johnson. The record was also released in the United Kingdom with a different track list. Four singles released from the album became minor country hits between 1984 and 1987.

=== 1990–present: New artistic directions ===
Beginning in the early 1990s, Anderson focused more on songwriting, but he continued recording his own music. Anderson's first studio release of the decade was 1992's Country Music Heaven, issued on Curb Records. It was a collection of gospel songs that was inspired by his grandfather, a Methodist preacher. The album's title track was issued as a single, but did not chart in any Billboard music publications. The single was reviewed by Billboard in 1992, where it received comparisons to music by Garth Brooks. In 1998, Anderson was signed to Warner Bros. Records as part of a veteran artists project that included Ronnie Milsap and Connie Smith. That year, his 36th studio offering titled Fine Wine was released. The project was produced by Steve Wariner and his wife Caryn. John Weisberger of Country Standard Time gave the release a positive response, calling the songs "vintage". Meanwhile, Allmusic only gave it 2.5 out of 5 stars. He began taking new artistic directions with his next studio release, A Lot of Things Different (2001). The album represented a traditional country style, which Anderson called his most traditional effort yet. It was released on Varèse Sarabande, through which Anderson distributed music in conjunction with his own record label, TWI.

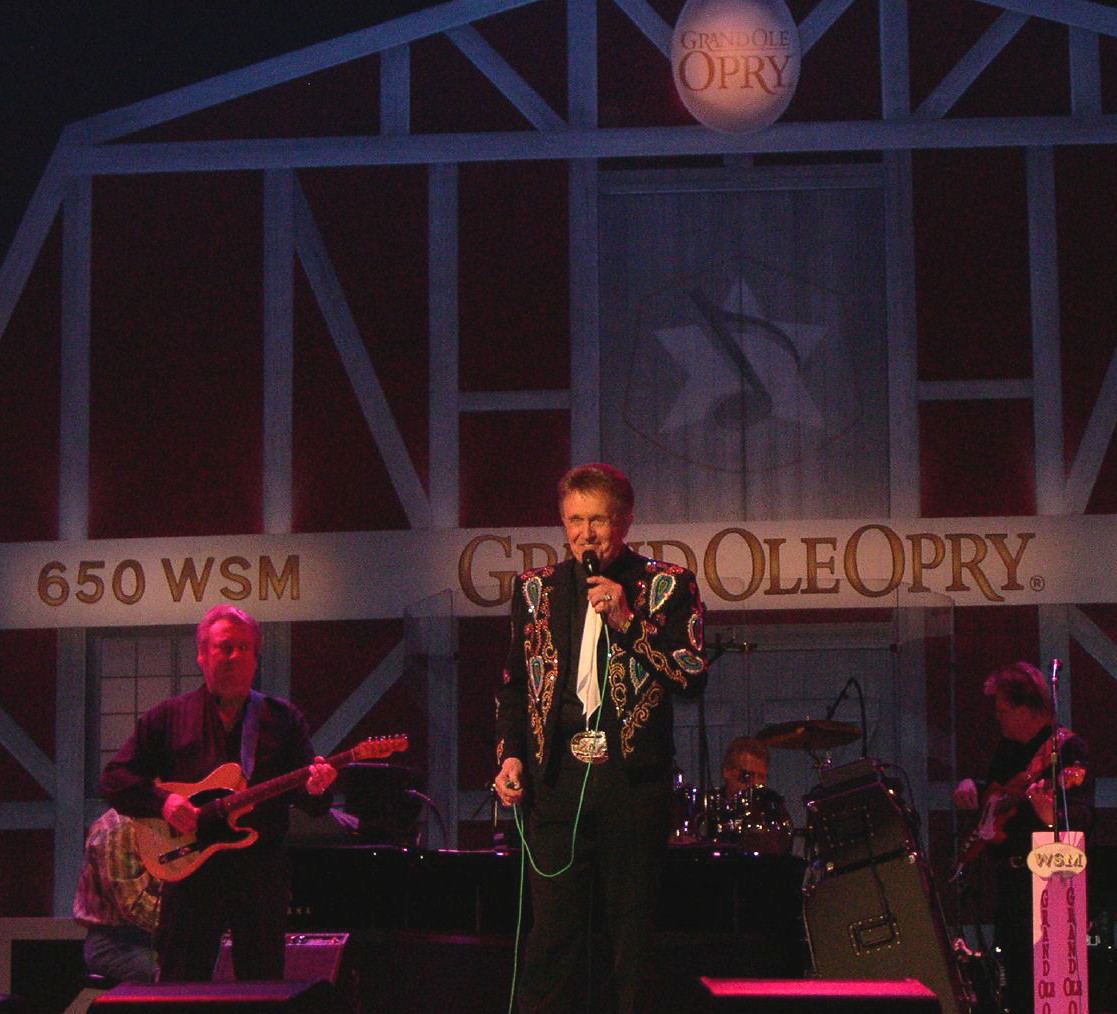
Anderson performing at the Grand Ole Opry, 2006

Anderson's artistic directions continued expanding into the 2000s. After the release of another holiday album, No Place Like Home on Christmas, he released a third gospel project in 2004, Softly & Tenderly. A year later, he released a contemporary country album titled The Way I Feel. It included his own version of Brad Paisley's "Whiskey Lullaby", along with his own compositions. It was reviewed positively by Al Campbell, who praised its songwriting quality. In 2007, Anderson released his first collection of bluegrass music called Whisperin' Bluegrass. Released on Madacy Entertainment, it included collaborations with Vince Gill and Dolly Parton. Chet Flippo of Country Music Television called it "a terrific album of country and gospel songs done up with bluegrass instrumentation".

In 2010 and 2014, respectively, Anderson released two self-produced studio albums: Songwriter and Life!. In 2018, his 44th studio effort, Anderson, was issued and featured a collaboration with Jamey Johnson. He followed this with his 45th studio recording in 2020 called The Hits Re-Imagined. The album was a collection of re-recorded hits and songs Anderson had written in his career. Billboard gave the record a favorable review: "At 82, Anderson brings a gravitas to the heavier songs and a lightheartedness to tunes like "Po Folks" with a low-key production that keeps the focus squarely on Anderson and his delivery. Just as it should be". In June 2022, a compilation titled The Best of Bill Anderson: As Far as I Can See was released by MCA Nashville and included a new track featuring Dolly Parton.

== Songwriting career ==
=== 1958–1979: Breakthrough in Nashville ===
Anderson's writing career began during the same period as his recording career. His 1958 composition "City Lights" ultimately led to his songwriting success. In an interview with Ken Burns, Anderson recalled writing the song on a hotel roof: "I was up there one night in 1957 – I was 19 years old – and I managed to write the 'bright array of city lights as far as I can see'", he recalled. After Anderson's own version was released, it was brought to the attention of country artist Ray Price. It was picked up by his record label and became a number-one hit on the national country charts in 1958.

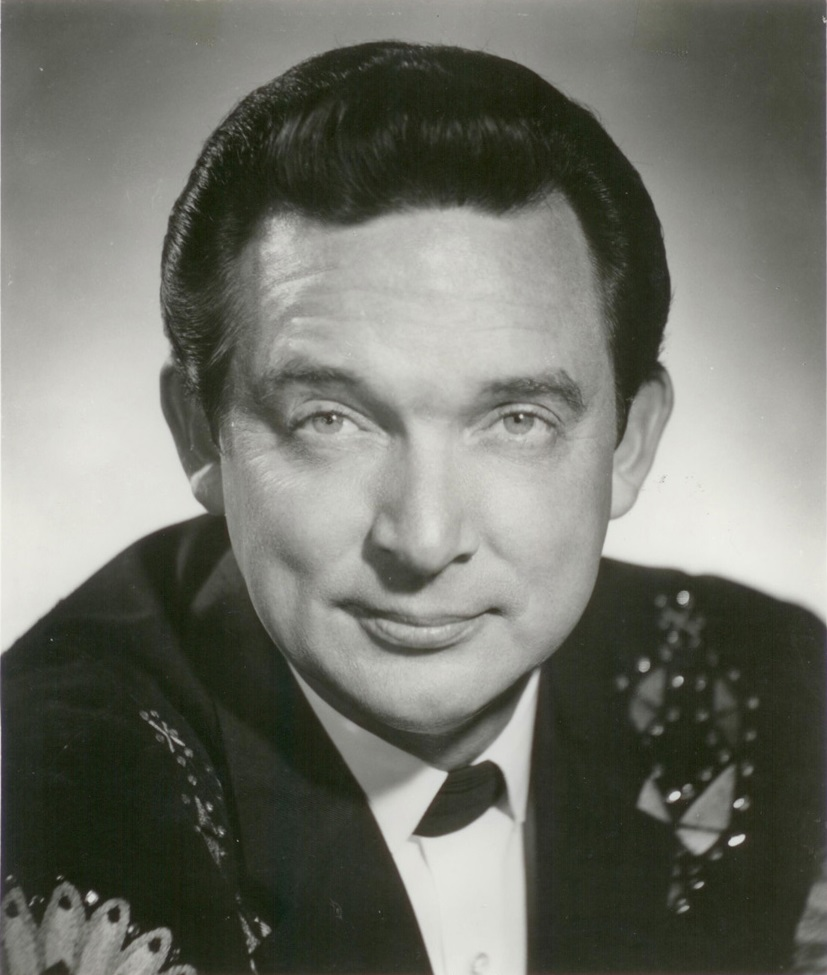
American country artist Ray Price was the first to record an Anderson composition.

"City Lights" by Ray Price (1958)
Anderson's 1958 composition was recorded and made a major hit by Ray Price. The song ultimately led to a successful songwriting career in country music.

The success of "City Lights" led Anderson to receive a contract from the Tree Writing music publishing company in Nashville. The Tree contract allowed Anderson to write songs for his own music and others. Among his next hits as a writer was "I Missed Me", which was cut by Jim Reeves. The single became a major country hit after reaching number three in December 1960. Another hit was "I Don't Love You Anymore", which was recorded by Charlie Louvin in 1964. Released as a single, the song became Lovin's biggest solo hit, reaching number four on the Billboard Hot Country Singles chart. That same year, Lefty Frizzell recorded Anderson's "Saginaw, Michigan". The single became Frizzell's first number one hit since 1952, topping the charts in March 1964. During this time, Anderson wrote two hits for Porter Wagoner, including 1964's "I'll Go Down Swinging". He was inspired to write the song after hearing the song title at the end of a Hank Snow record. Anderson also wrote solo hits for his duet partner, Jan Howard, in the 1960s. She had major hits with the Anderson-penned "Count Your Blessings, Woman", "I Still Believe in Love", and "Bad Seed". The latter track was a top ten hit for Howard in 1966.

Anderson also wrote several hits for Connie Smith. He was also responsible for helping Smith sign her first recording contract. Anderson had discovered Smith after hearing her perform in a talent contest near Columbus, Ohio. He helped bring her to Nashville, where she recorded several demonstration tapes that were heard by producers at RCA Victor Records. In 1964, Smith was signed to the label. Anderson's composition "Once a Day" was recorded by Smith in 1964. Released as her debut single, it spent a total of eight weeks on the Billboard Hot Country Singles chart, becoming his most successful hit as a writer at that point. Smith's career was further facilitated by Anderson, who wrote many of her follow-up hits such as "Then and Only Then", "Cincinnati, Ohio" and "I Never Once Stopped Loving You". Anderson further helped her professional career by helping her become a member of the Grand Ole Opry and make an appearance on The Lawrence Welk Show. "From the beginning, I liked Connie a lot personally and tried to help her", he recalled in his 2016 autobiography.

Anderson also wrote material for pop artists during this time. In the 1960s, Brenda Lee recorded Anderson's "My Whole World Is Falling Down". The single peaked at number 24 on the Billboard Hot 100 in August 1963. Other pop artists to record Anderson's material included James Brown, Aretha Franklin, and Dean Martin. However, his most successful material was recorded by country artists, who continued recording his songs into the next decade. In 1972, Cal Smith cut Anderson's "The Lord Knows I'm Drinking", which became a number-one hit on the Billboard country chart. The following year, Jean Shepard recorded Anderson's "Slippin Away". The single became Shepard's first top-10 hit in four years and she had further top-20 hits that decade with Anderson-penned compositions. That same decade, Conway Twitty also had a number-one hit with "I May Never Get to Heaven".

=== 1980–1991: Writing shifts ===
Anderson's writing and recording careers slowed down at the same time. In the early 1980s, he began writing music less frequently. Instead, he began focusing on other projects in television. "I just knew that this is what I wanted to do for my life's work, but I do remember telling people I'd stop if it wasn't working out", he said in describing his move away from writing. In a 2020 interview with American Songwriter, Anderson also explained that the country market was shifting toward crossover pop. For that reason, he found it difficult to write material for other artists. "Country music was changing and I was wondering if I could still fit in. I don't know how I got in that funk, but it was a tough time", he recalled.

Anderson did not fully stop writing material for his own albums. On his 1983 studio release, Southern Fried, he wrote three of the record's tracks. His 1986 studio album, A Place in the Country, contained two tracks written (or co-written) by Anderson. However, only one album track was self-composed: "We May Never Pass This Way Again.' Both of these self-composed tracks were only included on the version of the album released in the United Kingdom. Anderson turned his writing priorities toward other directions, as well. In 1989, he released his first autobiography, Whisperin' Bill, via Longstreet Press. It was reviewed by Publishers Weekly in August 1989, giving it a mostly positive response: "Despite a measure of hoopla and hyperbole ('I did it . . . I did it all . . . but it wasn't easy'), the author does justice to a powerful story", reviewers commented.

=== 1992–present: Return to songwriting and collaborations with others ===
In 1992, country artist Steve Wariner recorded Anderson's 1960 hit "The Tip of My Fingers". Released as a single, it became a top-five hit on the Billboard Hot Country Songs chart that year and inspired Anderson to write again. "Steve's version of 'Tips' was some indication that words, melodies, and emotions can carry across decades", he commented. Among his next compositions was a song co-written with Vince Gill titled "Which Bridge to Cross (Which Bridge to Burn)". The song was written in a "writing appointment", where composers make arrangements to write music and are paid by recording hours in a time clock. "Which Bridge to Cross" was released as a single by Gill in 1994 and became a major hit, peaking at number four on the Billboard country chart. According to Anderson, the song's success helped him gain credibility with younger songwriters in Nashville. He began receiving phone calls from other writers and performers to set up more writing appointments. Anderson, who was not used to writing with others, decided to make adaptations to his own songwriting style to collaborate. "I let a lot of young kids tell me a lot of things, and I benefited from that, greatly", he recounted.

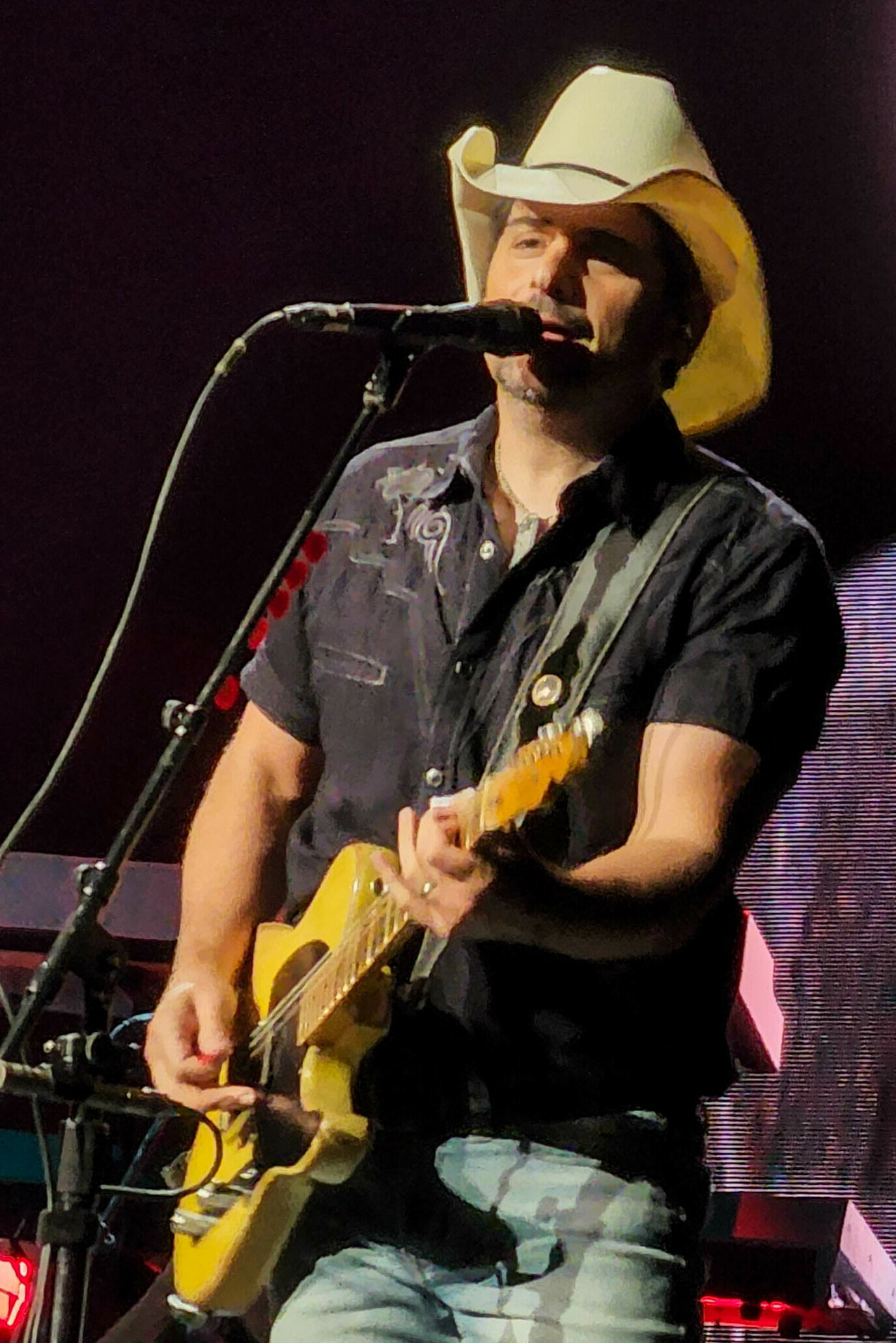
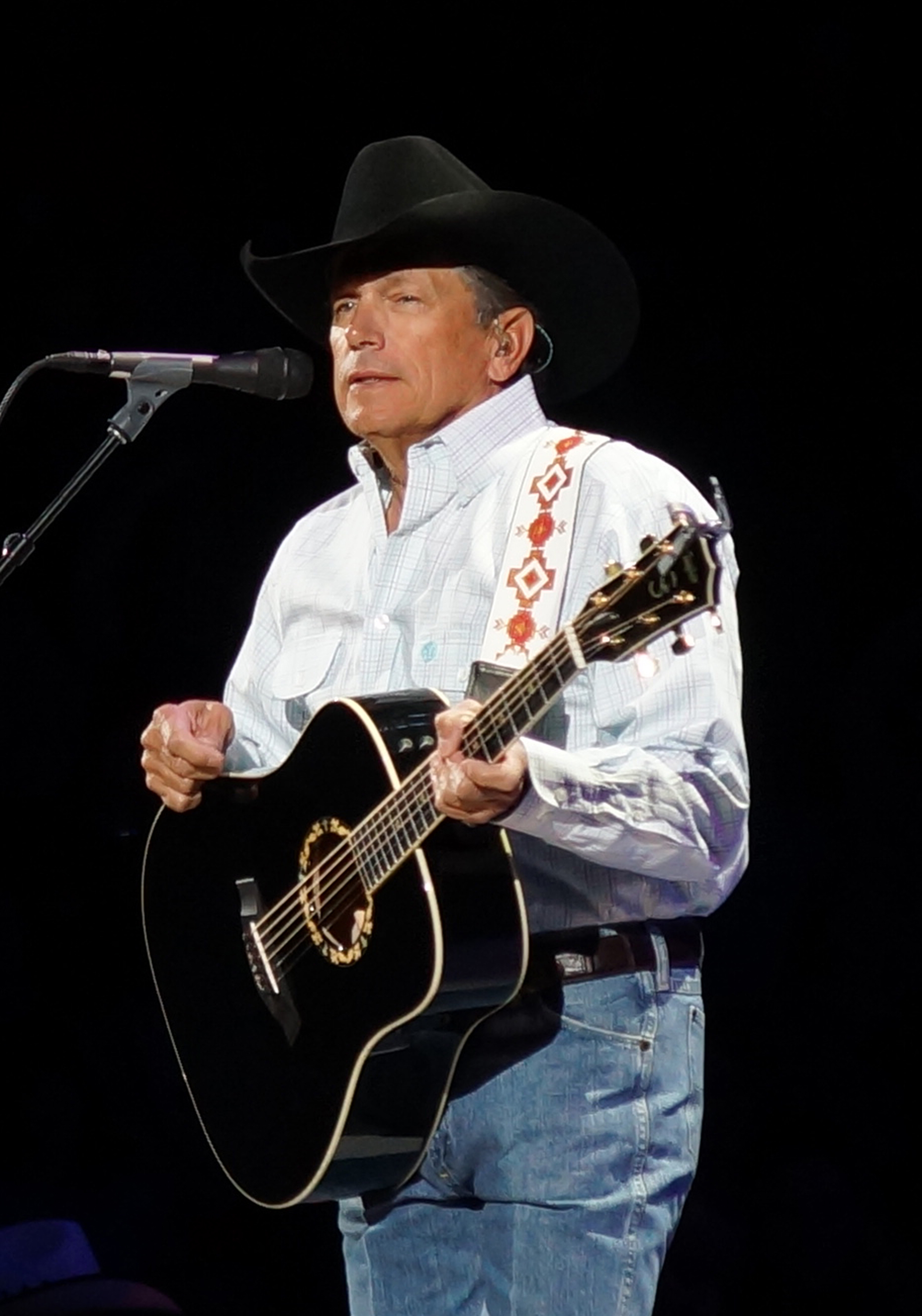
When Anderson relaunched his songwriting career, his compositions became major hits for artists such as Brad Paisley (left) and George Strait (right).

Anderson began co-writing more frequently during the 1990s. Wariner had another hit in 1999 with another Anderson composition titled "Two Teardrops". The song became a major hit when it reached number two on the country songs chart in June 1999. The song was also nominated for a Grammy award. During the same period, he collaborated with Skip Ewing and Debbie Moore on the song "Wish You Were Here". The song was released as a single by Mark Wills and became a number-one hit on the Billboard country chart in 1999. Anderson later commented that the song's success helped him resolve financial struggles he had battled during the decade. He followed "Wish You Were Here" with the song "A Lot of Things Different", which was co-written with Dean Dillon. The song was written during an exchange the pair had while out to breakfast. The song was later recorded by Kenny Chesney, whose version reached number six on the country singles chart in 2003.

Chesney's song was followed by a track later recorded by Brad Paisley and Alison Krauss, "Whiskey Lullaby". The tune was composed with singer-songwriter Jon Randall. After writing the song, Randall was reluctant to record a demo of the record to pitch to other artists, but Anderson believed the song could be a success and its demo was then recorded at 10 o'clock on a weeknight. Paisley's version was released as a single in 2004 and peaked at number three on the Billboard country chart that year. In 2005, "Whiskey Lullaby" won Song of the Year at the Country Music Association Awards. Anderson recalled the excitement of winning the accolade in his autobiography: "I jumped up and hugged Brad and knocked his white Western hat from his head."

In 2006, Anderson co-wrote a song with Jamey Johnson and Buddy Cannon called "Give It Away". Later cut by George Strait, the song was inspired by Johnson's divorce at the time and included a spoken narration, a device that was not popular in the country genre during the mid-2000s. Strait's version was released as a single in 2006 and reached number one on the country chart that September. The song later won Song of the Year from the CMA Awards, becoming Anderson's third accolade from the awards show in the last three years. Later that decade, Anderson collaborated with other writers to compose "Joey" for the country duo Sugarland. The single reached the top 20 of the country songs chart in 2009. In 2014, Anderson co-wrote Mo Pitney's top-30 country hit "Country" with Pitney and Bobby Tomberlin.

On July 22, 2023, Anderson was honored as the Grand Ole Opry's longest-serving member in the show's history. As of 2026, he still holds this title, at a record number of 65 years. Anderson's membership has not lapsed since his 1961 induction.

== Other career contributions ==
=== Film and television ===
Between 1965 and 1974, Anderson hosted his own national television series called The Bill Anderson Show. The program also featured Jan Howard (his duet partner) and the Po' Boys (his touring band). The show was first filmed in Windsor, Ontario, and Charlotte, North Carolina. Filming was later moved to the General Electric Broadcasting Facility in Nashville. Broadcasting from Nashville made traveling easier, since Anderson lived in the city. On an average filming day, Anderson taped two 30-minute shows in front of a live audience. Around this time, he also appeared in several country music vehicle films. This included The Las Vegas Hillbillys, which featured country artists Sonny James and Connie Smith. He also made appearances on several national television shows during this time, including The Today Show.

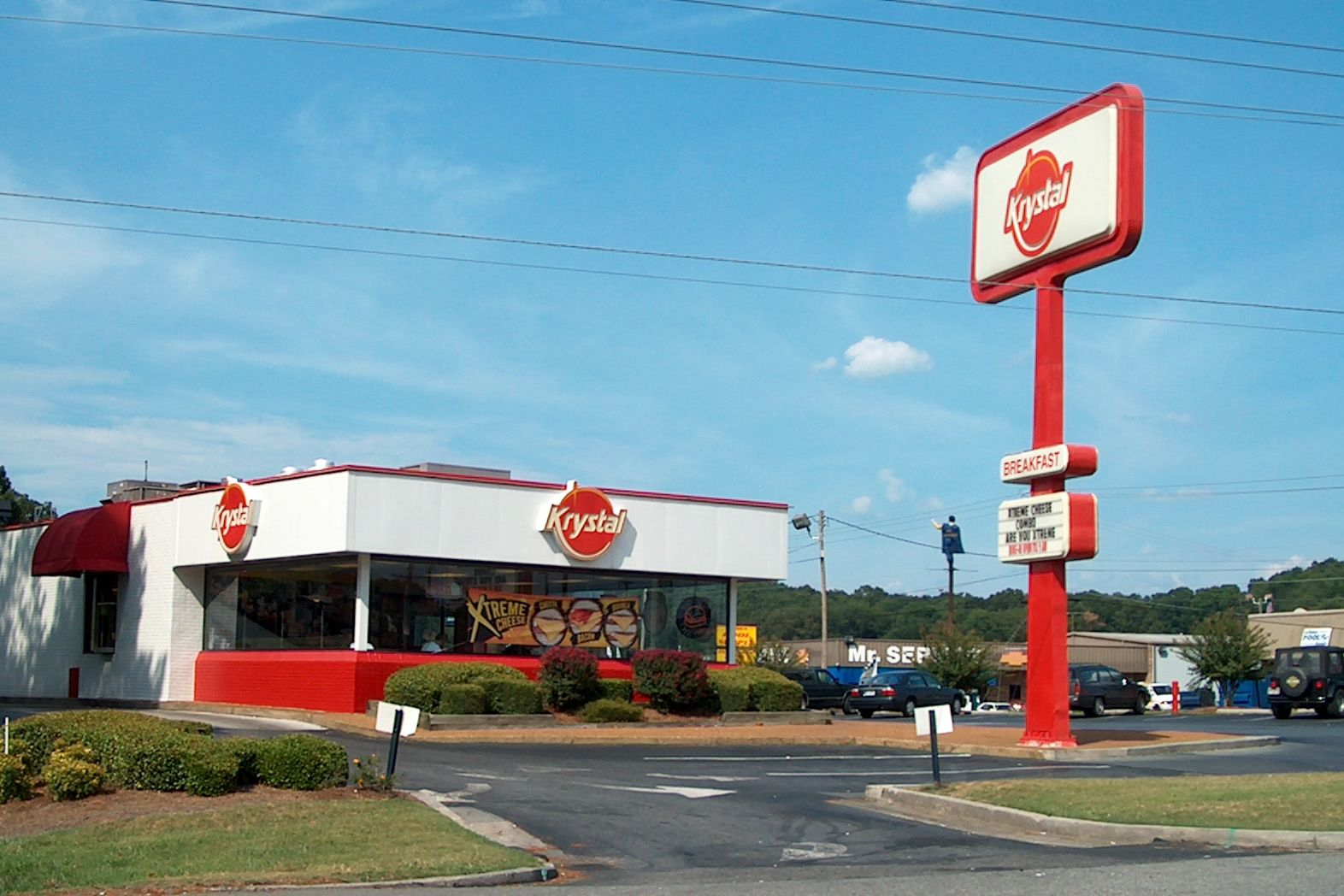
Anderson became a spokesperson for the Po' Folks fast-food company. The company was later bought out by the Krystal hamburger chain (pictured above).

Anderson ventured further into television in the late 1970s. Between 1977 and 1978, Sarah Purcell and he co-hosted the ABC game show The Better Sex. In 1980, he appeared on two episodes of the ABC soap opera One Life to Live, portraying a fictionalized version of himself. In a 1980 interview, then-ABC vice president Jackie Smith called the decision "a first" for a country artist. Also in the 1980s, Anderson hosted the program Backstage at the Grand Ole Opry and the game show Fandango, which both aired on the former The Nashville Network (now TNN). Fandango was brought to Anderson's attention by the program director of WSM TV in Nashville, who believed that a country-music trivia show would be successful for the network. "I've gotten into a lot of different things. I'm probably in the public eye more right now than I've ever been because of the things that I do on television", Anderson said in 1988. He remained with Fandango until 1989. Anderson was then invited to join the cast of the TNN competition program You Can Be a Star. Anderson was involved in the show's inner workings, including helping to develop the scoring system. In addition, his touring band was hired as the show's stage band.

Anderson appeared as himself in the February 15, 1965, episode of To Tell the Truth, receiving two of the four possible votes. Major League Baseball pitcher Tracy Stallard appeared as one of the two imposters for Anderson.

=== Business career ===
Anderson also focused on business opportunities, many of which were unsuccessful. In his autobiography, he commented, "I've tried to become a businessman a couple of times when I should have kept right on pickin' and grinnin'." In 1975, he bought a radio station in Provo, Utah, called KIXX. Anderson was unable to acquire enough advertisers to support the station, causing it to fail. Six years later, he sold the station and left the radio industry. "I was totally disillusioned by something I love", he wrote in 2016.

In the 1980s, Anderson served as a spokesperson for the Po' Folks restaurant chain, whose name was taken from his 1961 hit song. Anderson signed a three-year contract with the restaurant company to serve as their national spokesperson, appearing in radio and television commercials. In addition, Anderson signed off on allowing the company to use his photos and signatures to endorse their products. He then partnered with the vice president to help franchise the company. Country artist Conway Twitty was a third partner who helped with franchising. However, several individual restaurants encountered financial struggles, which resulted in legal fees that Anderson had to pay. In addition, the company was being bought out by the larger Krystal fast-food chain. He was forced to pay back fees he owed to the company, nearly causing Anderson to declare bankruptcy. With the support of Twitty, though, Anderson helped resolve the company's financial entanglements. "Even as it stood, my little foray into the restaurant business wiped out a large chunk of my life's savings", he later said.

== Personal life ==
Anderson has been married twice and has had two documented long-term relationships. He met his first wife Bette (née Rhodes) in the late 1950s through a mutual friend. The pair married in December 1959 when she was 19 and he was 22. During their 10-year marriage, they welcomed two daughters. Bette also contributed to her husband's writing career when she co-wrote the 1965 song "I Can't Remember", which Connie Smith recorded on her 1965 studio album Cute 'n' Country. The pair separated in 1968 and officially divorced in 1969. Reflecting on his divorce in 2016, Anderson believed that they drifted apart because Bette struggled to understand the music business. Bette Anderson died in 2010 at age 69.

In 1970, he married his second wife, Becky. Together, the couple had one child. In 1984, Becky was involved in a car accident that caused "25 percent brain impairment." The couple filed a lawsuit against the driver who had crashed into Becky's vehicle. Her recovery process took several years. The couple separated in the 1990s before officially divorcing in 1997.

Anderson briefly dated Deborah Marlin following his second divorce. In 2003, Anderson was arrested after being accused by Marlin of hitting her with his car door. He was released from jail the same day.

Anderson began dating Vickie Salas around 2008. The couple had first met years prior when she was 19 and was romantically involved with Anderson's band member. The two reconnected following Anderson's second divorce. "We never married, we never lived together, but she became my everything", Anderson later remembered. In 2016, Salas was diagnosed with cancer. Three years later, the disease intensified and she began receiving hospice care. She died in January 2019.

== Musical styles ==
As a songwriter, Anderson has composed a variety of material. Author Kurt Wolff calls his early compositions "cute and sentimental", citing "Po' Folks" and "I Love You Drops" as examples of this style. Wolff notes that other songs exemplify "anti-establishment attitudes" while others focus on themes that are "desperately bleak". Riane Konc of The Boot noted a similar trend in his songwriting style. She highlighted 2004's "Whiskey Lullaby" as an example. In reviewing the song, Konc commented that it was "packed full of unforgettable images" related to "heartbreak, addiction and loss". Konc also praised 2006's "Give It Away", calling it an "instant classic". In a 2018 interview with American Songwriter, Anderson described his songwriting style: "The lyric is what attracted me to country music as a young boy– the story songs that I could listen to and feel some emotion. So yeah, I'd like to have the next generation pull out a few lines I've written and say 'yeah that's pretty clever!'"

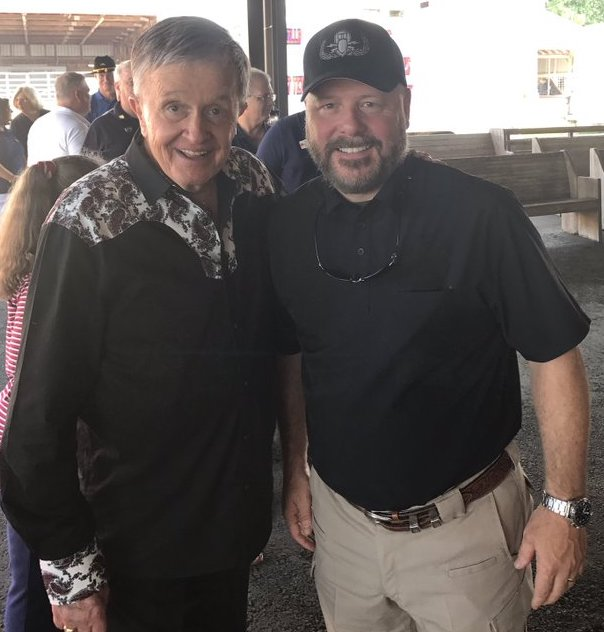
Anderson and Arkansas Congressman Rick Crawford, 2017

Anderson also created a musical style as a recording artist. After signing with Decca Records, he was given the nickname of "Whisperin' Bill Anderson", due to his soft-spoken vocal performance. Writer and critic Kurt Wolff has commented on this "whispering" vocal style. Wolff also noted that many of his recordings included a combination of both "singing and recitation". Steve Huey of Allmusic calls Anderson's voice "airy" and "gentle". Stephen L. Betts of Rolling Stone commented that Anderson continues to demonstrate a whispering quality into his current work. In 2020, Betts stated that Anderson's vocal style "remains subdued in the present".

== Legacy and honors ==
Writers and music critics have considered Anderson one of country music's most significant songwriters. Steve Huey of AllMusic called him "one of the most successful songwriters in country music history". Ken Burns of PBS called him an "acclaimed singer-songwriter". In 2019, The Boot further commented on Anderson's legacy: "In fact, one of the most impressive things about Anderson is his versatility: He's the soft voice behind many classic country songs, but he's also the writer or co-writer of plenty of your current favorites." Kevin John Coyne of Country Universe cited Anderson's songwriting as the center of his legacy: "It's been Bill Anderson's songwriting that's kept him topping the country charts for decades longer than even his most successful contemporaries."

In 1975, Anderson was inducted into the Nashville Songwriters Hall of Fame. In 2001, he was inducted into the Country Music Hall of Fame. In November 2002, BMI named him its first country songwriting icon, placing him alongside R&B artists Little Richard, Chuck Berry, Bo Diddley, and James Brown as the only recipients of that award. In 2018, he was inducted into the Songwriters Hall of Fame, along with Alan Jackson and John Mellencamp. Anderson has also been placed on several lists of country music's top writers and performers. In 2008, he was ranked 27th on Country Universe's list of the "100 Greatest Men of Country Music". He was ranked among the "100 Greatest Country Artists of All Time" in a 2017 list compiled by Rolling Stone.

== Discography ==
Studio albums

- 1963: Still
- 1964: Bill Anderson Sings
- 1964: Showcase
- 1966: Bright Lights and Country Music (with The Po' Boys)
- 1966: I Love You Drops
- 1967: Get While the Gettin's Good
- 1967: I Can Do Nothing Alone
- 1968: For Loving You (with Jan Howard)
- 1968: Wild Weekend
- 1968: Happy State of Mind
- 1969: My Life/But You Know I Love You
- 1969: Christmas
- 1970: If It's All the Same to You (with Jan Howard)
- 1970: Love Is a Sometimes Thing
- 1970: Where Have All Our Heroes Gone
- 1971: Always Remember
- 1972: Bill and Jan (Or Jan and Bill) (with Jan Howard)
- 1972: Singing His Praise (with Jan Howard)
- 1972: Bill Anderson Sings for "All the Lonely Women in the World"
- 1972: Don't She Look Good
- 1973: Bill
- 1974: "Whispering" Bill Anderson
- 1975: Every Time I Turn the Radio On/Talk to Me Ohio
- 1976: Sometimes (with Mary Lou Turner)
- 1976: Peanuts and Diamonds and Other Jewels
- 1977: Scorpio
- 1977: Billy Boy & Mary Lou (with Mary Lou Turner)
- 1978: Love...& Other Sad Stories
- 1979: Ladies Choice
- 1980: Nashville Mirrors
- 1983: Southern Fried (with The Po' Folks)
- 1984: Yesterday, Today, and Tomorrow
- 1986: A Place in the Country
- 1993: Country Music Heaven
- 1996: Greatest Songs
- 1998: Fine Wine
- 2001: A Lot of Things Different
- 2002: No Place Like Home on Christmas
- 2004: Softly & Tenderly
- 2005: The Way I Feel
- 2007: Whisperin' Bluegrass
- 2010: Songwriter
- 2014: Life
- 2018: Anderson
- 2020: The Hits Re-Imagined

== Filmography ==
Film and television appearances by Bill Anderson
| Title | Year | Role | Notes | Ref. |
|---|---|---|---|---|
| The Bill Anderson Show | 1965–1974 | Host | | |
| The Las Vegas Hillbillys | 1966 | Himself | | |
| The Road to Nashville | 1967 | Himself | | |
| Alias Smith and Jones | 1972 | Cobb | Episode: "The Men That Corrupted Hadleyburg" | |
| Match Game | 1976–1978 | Himself | 31 episodes | |
| Match Game PM | 1976–1981 | Himself | Seven episodes | |
| The Better Sex | 1977–1978 | Host | | |
| Password Plus | 1979–1982 | Himself | 17 episodes | |
| One Life to Live | 1980 | Himself | Two episodes: "Grand Ole Opry Part One" and "Grand Ole Opry Part Two" | |
| Match Game-Hollywood Squares Hour | 1984 | Himself | Five episodes | |
| Fandango | 1983–1989 | Host | | |

== Awards and nominations ==
| Year | Nominee / work | Award | Result | Ref. |
|---|---|---|---|---|
| 1965 | Grammy Awards | Best Country Song for "Once a Day" | Nominated | |
| 1967 | Grammy Awards | Best Country Song for "Cold Hard Facts of Life" | Nominated | |
| 1967 | Country Music Association Awards | Entertainer of the Year | Nominated | |
| 1968 | Country Music Association Awards | Vocal Duo of the Year (with Jan Howard) | Nominated | |
| 1970 | Country Music Association Awards | Vocal Duo of the Year (with Jan Howard) | Nominated | |
| 1975 | Academy of Country Music Awards | Top Vocal Group (with Mary Lou Turner) | Nominated | |
| 1975 | Nashville Songwriters Hall of Fame | Inducted as a Member | Won | |
| 1976 | Country Music Association Awards | Vocal Duo of the Year (with Mary Lou Turner) | Nominated | |
| 1977 | Country Music Association Awards | Vocal Duo of the Year (with Mary Lou Turner) | Nominated | |
| 2000 | Grammy Awards | Best Country Song for "Two Teardrops" (with Steve Wariner) | Nominated | |
| 2001 | Academy of Country Music Awards | Vocal Event of the Year for "Too Country" (with George Jones, Brad Paisley and Buck Owens) | Nominated | |
| 2001 | Country Music Association Awards | Vocal Event of the Year for "Too Country" (with George Jones, Brad Paisley and Buck Owens) | Won | |
| 2001 | Country Music Hall of Fame | Inducted as a Member | Won | |
| 2002 | BMI Awards | Songwriting Icon Award | Won | |
| 2002 | Academy of Country Music Awards | Song of the Year for "A Lot of Things Different" (with Dean Dillon) | Nominated | |
| 2004 | Academy of Country Music Awards | Song of the Year for "Whiskey Lullaby" (with Jon Randall) | Nominated | |
| 2004 | Country Music Association Awards | Song of the Year for "Whiskey Lullaby" (with Jon Randall) | Nominated | |
| 2005 | Country Music Association Awards | Song of the Year for "Whiskey Lullaby" (with Jon Randall) | Won | |
| 2006 | Academy of Country Music Awards | Song of the Year for "Give It Away" (with Buddy Cannon and Jamey Johnson) | Won | |
| 2007 | Grammy Awards | Best Country Song for "Give It Away" (with Buddy Cannon and Jamey Johnson) | Nominated | |
| 2007 | Country Music Association Awards | Song of the Year for "Give It Away" (with Buddy Cannon and Jamey Johnson) | Won | |
| 2018 | Songwriters Hall of Fame | Inducted as a Member | Won | |
| 2023 | Grammy Awards | Best American Roots Performance for "Someday It'll All Make Sense" (with Dolly Parton) | Nominated | |
