= Po' Folks (restaurant) =

American restaurant chain

PoFolks
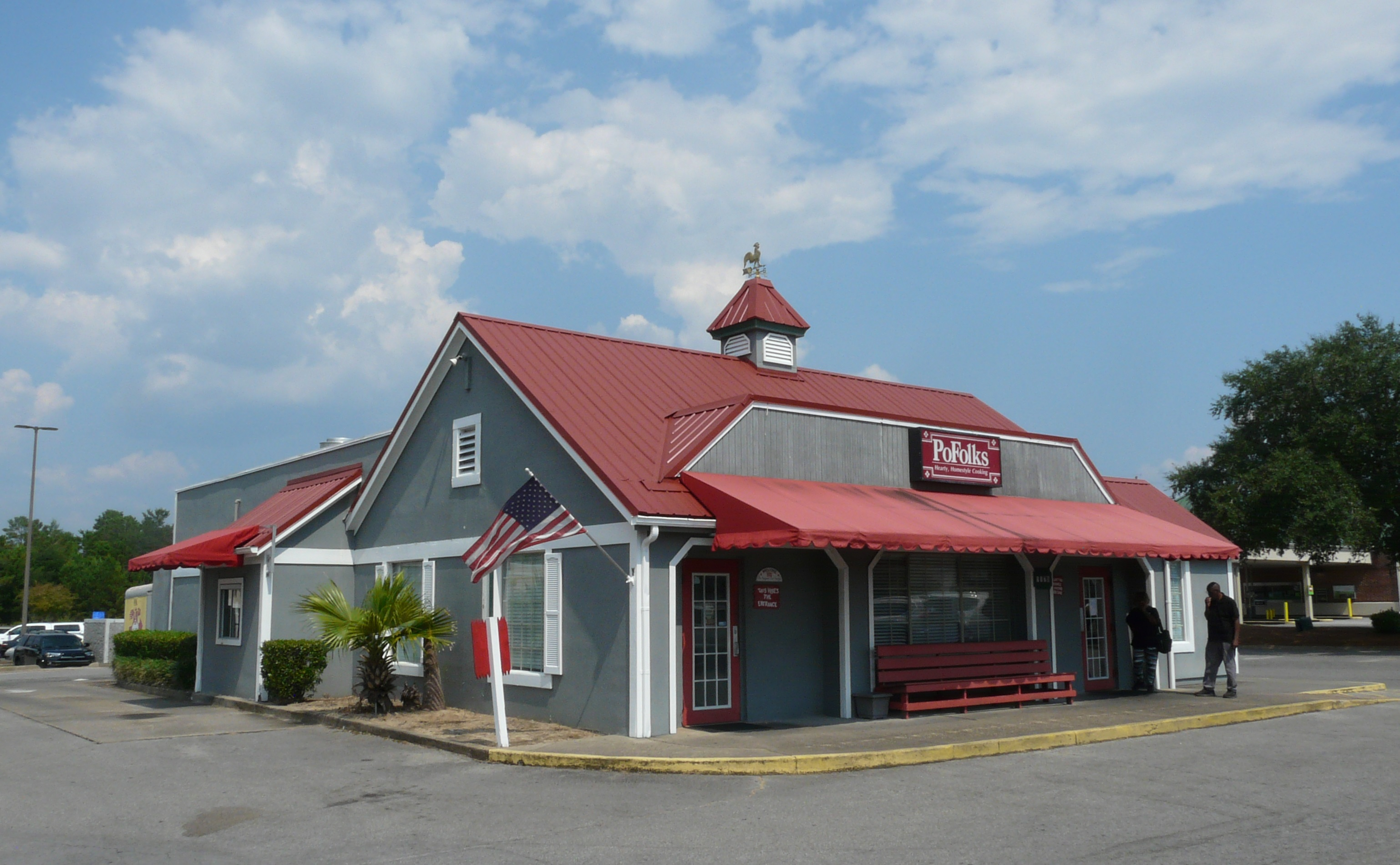
- location in Niceville, Florida
- Type: Private
- Industry: Casual Dining Restaurants
- Founded: 1975; 51 years ago in Anderson, South Carolina
- Founder: Cole Stewart
- Headquarters: Panama City, Florida, United States
- Owner: private (1975-82); Krystal (1982-88); Peter Sostheim (???–present)
- Website: pofolks.com

Po' Folks (later restyled as PoFolks) is an American family restaurant chain founded in 1975 in Anderson, South Carolina. Between 1982 and 1988, Po' Folks was operated by the fast food chain Krystal. As of December 2024, the company operates 5 locations in Florida.

== History ==
Cole Stewart opened the first Po' Folks in 1975 in Anderson, South Carolina.

The restaurant was named after the 1961 hit single by country music singer Bill Anderson. Although Anderson initially planned to file a lawsuit against the chain for using the name, he later sold the rights to the chain and served as its spokesperson. He and Conway Twitty also acquired franchise rights to a location in Oklahoma City in 1983. Anderson's country-music themed game show on TNN, Fandango, was sponsored by the restaurant.

Krystal acquired Po' Folks in 1982 and continued to expand it. By 1984, the chain had 102 restaurants in 17 states. Eric A. Holm (now with Golden Corral) was director of construction and accused of taking bribes for favorable construction deals. Krystal later merged Po' Folks with DavCo, a division of the company that franchised Wendy's restaurants.

In 1988, Po' Folks filed for bankruptcy. As a result, the Po' Folks restaurants were sold, and the remaining assets continued to operate as DavCo. Several franchises in the Atlanta, Georgia, area continued to operate as Folks Southern Kitchens until that chain closed in the 2020 COVID-19 pandemic. As of June 2023, there are five PoFolks locations remaining in Florida (in Callaway, Lynn Haven, Niceville, Pensacola and St. Petersburg), purchased after the corporation was liquidated in 1988.

=== Buddy Killen-Burt Reynolds Investment ===
In the 1980s, actor Burt Reynolds partnered with Killen Music Group owner Buddy Killen to invest in Po' Folks. The failure of the chain, along with the failure of another restaurant chain Killen-Reynolds invested in, personally cost Reynolds a $20 million loss.
