= Southern Fried (Bill Anderson album) =

Studio album by Bill Anderson and the Po' Folks
- Released: 1983
- Studios: Grand Ole Opry; Southern Track Studio
- Genre: Country
- Label: Southern Tracks
- Producers: Bill Anderson; Mike Johnson

Bill Anderson and the Po' Folks chronology
Nashville Mirrors (1980)	Southern Fried (1983)	Yesterday, Today, and Tomorrow (1984)

Singles from Southern Fried
- 1. "Southern Fried" Released: July 1982; 2. "Laid Off" Released: November 1982; 3. "Thank You Darling" Released: February 1983; 4. "Son of the South/20th Century Fox" Released: July 1983

Southern Fried is a studio album by American country singer-songwriter Bill Anderson and his band the Po' Folks. It was released in 1983 on Southern Tracks Records. It was co-produced by Anderson and Mike Johnson. The album marked Anderson's first release on an independent record label after previously recording for MCA Records for many years. The album produced four singles released between 1982 and 1983, all of which charted on the Billboard country songs survey.

== Background and content ==
Anderson left MCA Records in 1981 after his contract was not renewed. Subsequently, Anderson focused more on songwriting, but decided to go back into the studio in 1982. Southern Fried was recorded in three separate venues: the label's own Southern Tracks Studio in Atlanta, Georgia; the Grand Ole Opry house in Nashville, Tennessee; and RCA Studio B in Nashville, in the liner notes and formerly known as Music Hall. This is Anderson's first self-produced album, produced in part with bandleader Mike Johnson. Johnson was the bandleader of the Po' Folks Band, Anderson's backing band that received equal billing (i.e. "Bill Anderson and the Po' Folks") The album only consisted of 6 tracks, one of the shortest albums of Anderson's. Four songs were penned by Anderson, including the title track. He also acquired material from other songwriters for the project and collaborated with Jane Abbot on "20th Century Fox".

== Release ==
The release of Southern Fried was announced a year before its release. In a 1982 issue of Billboard, the album was categorized under the title "mini LP" due to its short track listing. The album was released in 1983 on Southern Tracks Records, making the record his 31st studio recording. The album was issued as a vinyl LP, with only three songs on each side of the record.

It was Anderson's second studio album not to make the Billboard album charts. The album did however did include four singles. All of the singles became minor hits between 1982 and 1983. The title track was released as the lead single in July 1982. It reached number 42 on the Billboard Hot Country Songs chart. "Laid Off" was issued as the second single in November 1983, reaching number 82 in January 1983. "Thank You Darling" was released as a single in February 1983, peaking at number 70 by April. "Son of the South" was released in conjunction with its B-side, "20th Century Fox", shortly afterwards, becoming a minor hit as well.

== Track listing ==
Side one
No.	Title	Writer(s)	Length
1.	"Laid Off"	Bill Anderson
2.	"Thank You Darling"	Thom Lazaros
3.	"Son of the South"	Bill Anderson

Side two
No.	Title	Writer(s)	Length
1.	"Southern Fried"	Bill Anderson
2.	"You Turn the Light On"	Lewis Anderson; Steve Geyer
3.	"20th Century Fox"	Bill Anderson / Jane Abbott

== Personnel ==
All credits are adapted from the liner notes of Southern Fried.

Musical personnel: Musicians: Steel Guitar & Dobro - Mike Johnson; Drums & Percussion - Mike Streeter; Lead Guitar & Banjo - Les Singer; Bass - Mark Johnson; Keyboards - Bev Porter & Judy Felts; Rhythm Guitars - Les Singer & Jimmy Capps; Fiddle - Tommy Williams

Background Singers: Bev Porter, Judy Felts, Mike Streeter, Judy Felts, Mark Johnson, Les Singer, Mike Johnson, Yvonne Hodges, Herman Harper.

Technical personnel: Produced by Bill Anderson & Mike Johnson for Backstage Productions. Engineered by Doug Johnson & Bill Vandervort. Musical Arrangements - Mike Johnson. Vocal Arrangements - Bev Porter. String Arrangements - Al DeLory.

== Release history ==
Region	Date	Format	Label	Ref.
United States	1983	Vinyl	Southern Tracks Records	
