= A Lot of Things Different (album) =

Studio album by Bill Anderson
- Released: August 7, 2001
- Studio: Sony Firehall Studio
- Genre: Country
- Length: 37:42
- Labels: TWI; Varèse Sarabande
- Producers: Bill Anderson; Rex Schnelle

Bill Anderson chronology
Fine Wine (1998)	A Lot of Things Different (2001)	No Place Like Home on Christmas (2002)

A Lot of Things Different is a studio album by American country singer-songwriter Bill Anderson. It was released on August 7, 2001 via TWI Records and Varèse Sarabande. The album was Anderson's 37th studio recording and his first to be released on his own record label (TWI). It contained ten tracks, all of which Anderson took part in composing.

== Background and content ==
According to Anderson, A Lot of Things Different was a departure from some of his more recent albums of the time period. In a 2001 interview he commented that it was, "the most traditional country album I've done in a long time and frankly, I got better reviews on it from fans than anything I've done in a long, long time." It was recorded at Sony Firehall Studio and co-produced by both Anderson and Rex Schnelle. The project was a collection of ten tracks which Anderson either wrote or co-wrote. Included is a cover of "When Two Worlds Collide", which was a hit for its co-writer (Roger Miller). Also included is "A Death in the Family", which was first recorded by Little Jimmy Dickens.

At the time of the album's recording, Anderson had been contributing his songwriting to music that had become hits for other artists. Among these songs was "Too Country", which was recorded by Brad Paisley. Anderson included his own version of A Lot of Things Different. The title track would later be recorded and made a major hit by Kenny Chesney. In 2016, Anderson explained how he co-wrote the track with Dean Dillon. "When we wrote 'A Lot of Things Different' in 2002, I was at the point then that I could look over my shoulder and say, 'Golly, I’d do that different if I had the chance to do that again.' You gain wisdom," he reflected.

== Release and reception ==
Professional ratings
Review scores
Source	Rating
Allmusic	3/5 stars

A Lot of Things Different was released on August 7, 2001 on TWI Records, but also in conjunction with the Varèse Sarabande label. Anderson explained in 2001 that he enjoyed collaborating with the Varèse label. "They're great in allowing me to keep the manufacturing and distribution rights through the website and fan club and personal appearances," he said. Although distributed through Varèse, Anderson self-released the album through his website and other facilities. "The major labels understand but one way to sell: Get it on the radio and put it in the stores. But today with changes in the marketplace and technology, there are many avenues that I intend to explore," Anderson commented in a 2001 interview. Anderson distributed the record as both a compact disc and a cassette.

Like his previous releases, A Lot of Things Different failed to make appearances on any Billboard album charts, most notably the Top Country Albums chart. The album was also reviewed by Allmusic, which gave the effort three out of five possible stars in their rating scale.

== Track listings ==
All tracks written by Bill Anderson, with additional writers noted.

No.	Title	Writer(s)	Length
1.	"Love Is a Fragile Thing"	Steve Wariner	3:46
2.	"When a Man Can't Get a Woman Off His Mind"	Sharon Vaughn	3:42
3.	"A Lot of Things Different"	Dean Dillon	4:08
4.	"Fine Line"	Walt Aldridge	4:21
5.	"When Two Worlds Collide"	Roger Miller	3:03
6.	"I Can't Find an Angel"	Jon Randall	4:11
7.	"Back When He Was Hungry"		3:33
8.	"A Death in the Family"		4:12
9.	"She's a Mistake I Made"		3:38
10.	"Too Country"	Chuck Cannon	3:08

== Personnel ==
All credits are adapted from Allmusic and the liner notes of A Lot of Things Different.

Musical personnel

- Bill Anderson – lead vocals
- Chip Davis – background vocals
- Rex Schnelle – accordion, background vocals, upright bass, drums, dulcimer, acoustic guitar, hammered dulcimer, mandolin, organ, piano
- Paco Shipp – harmonica
- Sharon Vaughn – background vocals
- Steve Wariner – background vocals, guitar

Technical personnel

- Bill Anderson – producer
- Amy Hill – layout design
- Cary E. Mansfield – release coordinator
- Bill Pitzonka – art direction
- Rex Schnelle – engineering, mixing, producer

== Release history ==
Region	Date	Format	Label	Ref.
United States	August 7, 2001	Cassette	TWI Records/Varèse Sarabande	
United States	August 7, 2001	Compact disc	TWI Records/Varèse Sarabande	
United States	2010s	Music download	TWI Records/Varèse Sarabande	
