= A Place in the Country (album) =

Studio album by Bill Anderson
- Released: 1986
- Studios: The Reflectionist; Southern Tracks; Swanee Stadium
- Genre: Country
- Labels: Po' Folks (1986); Bulldog (1988)
- Producer: Mike Johnson

Bill Anderson chronology
Yesterday, Today, and Tomorrow (1984)	A Place in the Country (1986)	Country Music Heaven (1993)

Singles from A Place in the Country
- 1. "Your Eyes" Released: April 1984; 2. "We May Never Pass This Way Again" Released: July 1984; 3. "Sheet Music" Released: December 1986; 4. "No Ordinary Memory" Released: August 1987

A Place in the Country is a studio album by American country singer-songwriter Bill Anderson. It was released in 1986 and was produced by Mike Johnson. The album marked Anderson's 33rd studio recording to be issued during his career. It was also his third independent studio album to be released. It also included three singles that were released and became charting singles on the Billboard country survey.

== Background and content ==
A Place in the Country was Anderson's third studio album released on an independent recording label. During his career, he mostly was working under Decca/MCA Records, but left the label in 1981 following the end of his contract. By being able to independently-release music, Anderson could choose his own producer. Mike Johnson (bandleader of his band The Po' Folks) produced the project, his second time doing so. Anderson and Johnson recorded the album with The Po' Folks at three separate studio locations: The Reflectionist, Swanee Stadium and Southern Tracks studios. The album consisted of 11 tracks in its original release. In a later edition issued in the United Kingdom, 12 tracks were included. The album included two tracks that were written by Anderson himself. Other tracks had been written by other songwriters, notably Shel Silverstein and Paul Overstreet. The project also included songs first recorded by other artists. The track, "Once More", was a cover of the original by Roy Acuff. Silverstein's "The Unicorn" was a cover of the original 1968 version. Anderson had previously recorded a different version for an earlier album as well.

== Release and chart performance ==
A Place in the Country was released in 1986 on Po' Folks Records, a label founded by Anderson. It was his first release for the label and his 33rd studio album overall. Original versions of the album were issued as vinyl LPs. The record did not reach the Billboard album charts, but did include three charting singles that became minor hits. The first single, "Your Eyes", was released in April 1984 and peaked at number 76 on the Billboard Hot Country Singles & Tracks chart. The album's second charting single was "Sheet Music". Released in December 1986, the single only reached number 80 in January 1987. The song was included on the second edition of the album. "No Ordinary Memory" was the album's final single and was released in August 1987. It reached number 78 on the country singles survey that same year. The United Kingdom version of the album included the 1984, "We May Never Pass This Way Again", which did not chart.

== Track listing ==
=== Original version ===
Side one (Po' Folks Records)
No.	Title	Writer(s)	Length
1.	"A Place in the Country"	Steve Clark; Johnny MacRae; Bob Morrison	3:57
2.	"Once More"	Dusty Owens	3:34
3.	"No Ordinary Memory"	Clark; MacRae	3:25
4.	"The Unicorn"	Shel Silverstein	3:04
5.	"Your Eyes"	Terry Carisse	2:55

Side two (Po' Folks Records)
No.	Title	Writer(s)	Length
1.	"Fathers and Sons"	Debbie Cothran	2:56
2.	"I Wonder Where You Are Tonight"	Johnny Bond	3:01
3.	"Maybe Go Down"	Paul Overstreet	3:01
4.	"Mr. Peepers"	Mark Charron	3:19
5.	"Family Reunion"	Felice and Boudleaux Bryant	3:04

=== UK version ===
Side one (Bulldog Records)
No.	Title	Writer(s)	Length
1.	"A Place in the Country"	Clark; MacRae; Morrison	3:57
2.	"Once More"	Owens	3:34
3.	"No Ordinary Memory"	Clark; MacRae	3:25
4.	"The Unicorn"	Silverstein	3:04
5.	"Your Eyes"	Carisse	2:55
6.	"Sheet Music"	Bill Anderson; A. Cain; D. Mathis	NA

Side two (Bulldog Records)
No.	Title	Writer(s)	Length
1.	"Fathers and Sons"	Cothran	2:56
2.	"I Wonder Where You Are Tonight"	Bond	3:01
3.	"Maybe Go Down"	Overstreet	3:01
4.	"Mr. Peepers"	Charron	3:19
5.	"Family Reunion"	Felice and Boudleaux Bryant	3:04
6.	"We May Never Pass This Way Again"	Anderson	NA

== Personnel ==
All credits are adapted from the liner notes of A Place in the Country.

Musical personnel

- Bill Anderson – lead vocals
- David Gould – harmonica
- Dirk Johnson – keyboards
- Mike Johnson – steel guitar, dobro
- Les Singer – guitar
- Mike Streeter – drums
- Bruce Watkins – guitar, banjo, fiddle, mandolin

Technical personnel

- Frank Evans – engineering
- Doug Johnson – engineering
- Mike Johnson – producer
- Gene Rice – engineering
- Kris Wilkinson – arrangement
- Bergen White – arrangement

== Release history ==
Region	Date	Format	Label	Ref.
United States	1986	Vinyl	Po' Folks Records	
United Kingdom	1988	Vinyl	Bulldog Records	
