= Walk Out Backwards =

Single by Bill Anderson
- B-side: "The Best of Strangers"
- Released: October 1960
- Recorded: September 1960
- Studio: Bradley Studio
- Genre: Country; Nashville Sound
- Length: 2:27
- Label: Decca
- Songwriter: Bill Anderson
- Producer: Owen Bradley

Bill Anderson singles chronology
"The Tip of My Fingers" (1960)	"Walk Out Backwards" (1960)	"Po' Folks" (1961)

"Walk Out Backwards" is a song written and recorded by American country singer-songwriter Bill Anderson. It was released as a single in October 1960 via Decca Records and became a major hit.

== Background and release ==
"Walk Out Backwards" was recorded in September 1960 at the Bradley Studio, located in Nashville, Tennessee. The sessions were produced by Owen Bradley, who would serve as Anderson's producer through most of years with Decca Records.

"Walk Out Backwards" was released as a single by Decca Records in October 1960. It spent a total of 14 weeks on the Billboard Hot Country and Western Sides chart before reaching number 9 in February 1960. It was Anderson's first top ten hit as a recording artist. The song was not issued on a proper album following its release.

== Track listings ==
7" vinyl single

- "Walk Out Backwards" – 2:27
- "The Best of Strangers" – 1:57

== Chart performance ==
Chart (1960–1961)	Peak position
US Hot Country Songs (Billboard)	9
