= The Way I Feel (Bill Anderson album) =

Studio album by Bill Anderson
- Released: June 14, 2005
- Genres: Country; contemporary country
- Length: 36:01
- Labels: TWI; Varèse Sarabande
- Producers: Sabino Allehgrini; Bill Anderson; Rex Schnelle; Mike Toppins

Bill Anderson chronology
Softly & Tenderly (2004)	The Way I Feel (2005)	Whisperin' Bluegrass (2007)

Singles from The Way I Feel
- 1. "Him and Me" Released: 2005

The Way I Feel is a studio album by American country singer-songwriter Bill Anderson. It was released on June 14, 2005, on TWI Records and the Varèse Sarabande label. The project was produced by Anderson himself, along with three additional producers. The album was Anderson's 40th studio recording in his music career and contained ten self-penned tracks. Included among the album's material was the song "Whiskey Lullaby", which was first a hit for Brad Paisley and Alison Krauss.

== Background and content ==
The Way I Feel was produced by Anderson himself in collaboration with Sabino Allegrini, Rex Schnelle and Mike Toppins. Both musicians had previously produced records with Anderson. The project was a collection of ten tracks, all of which Anderson had a hand in writing. To facilitate the writing process, he collaborated with Buddy Cannon, Melba Montgomery and Jon Randall. "When I first started this co-writing thing, back in the mid-’90s, man, I went nuts. I thought, ’Well, shoot, I want to write every day'," he recalled. Among the featured songs is the tune "Whiskey Lullaby", which he co-wrote with Randall. The song had first been cut by Brad Paisley and Alison Krauss and became a major hit in 2004.

== Release and reception ==
Professional ratings
Review scores
Source	Rating
Allmusic	3.5/5 stars

The Way I Feel was released on June 14, 2005, via Anderson's own label (TWI Records). It was distributed with the help of the Varèse Sarabande recording company. It was originally released as a compact disc. The album did not chart on any publication at the time of its release, including Billboard. The album spawned one single in 2005 called "Him and Me". The single did not chart on any Billboard publications as well, including the Hot Country Songs chart.

The Way I Feel was reviewed by Al Campbell of Allmusic, who gave the effort 3.5 out of 5 stars. Campbell praised the album's sound, which he called a "contemporary country" style. He also praised the album's various songwriting pairings. "The Way I Feel may not be the first "Whispering Bill" disc to purchase, but it does justice to Bill Anderson's massive catalog, which has endured for over four decades," he concluded.

== Track listing ==
All tracks written by Bill Anderson, with additional writers noted.

The Way I Feel (2005)
No.	Title	Writer(s)	Length
1.	"It's Been a Good Week"	Rob Crosby	2:55
2.	"That's Just the Way I Feel"	Tom Shapiro	3:35
3.	"Let It Go"	Shapiro	3:31
4.	"What Drove Her Away"	Buddy Cannon	3:27
5.	"Him and Me"	Tony Villanueva	3:50
6.	"Chip Chip" (featuring Rustie Blue)	Melba Montgomery	3:33
7.	"Whiskey Lullaby"	Jon Randall	4:16
8.	"Gettin' Ready for You"		3:36
9.	"Cold All the Time"	Irene Kelley	3:51
10.	"God's Country"	Casey Beathard	3:27

== Personnel ==
All credits are adapted from the liner notes of The Way I Feel and Allmusic.

Musical personnel

- Bill Anderson – lead vocals
- Rustie Blue – guest artist
- Chip Davis – background vocals
- Glen Duncan – fiddle
- James Freeze – bass
- Donna Hammitt – dobro, steel guitar
- Cotton Payne – drums
- Buck Reid – steel guitar
- Tammy Rogers – fiddle
- Gail Rudisill-Johnson – fiddle
- Rex Schnelle – background vocals, banjo, bass, drums, dulcimer, acoustic guitar, electric guitar, keyboards, mandolin
- Lester Earl Singer – acoustic guitar, banjo
- Mike Toppins – background vocals, dobro, steel guitar, keyboards
- Kenzie Wetz – background vocals, fiddle

Technical personnel

- Sabino Allegrini – producer
- Bill Anderson – audio production, producer
- Anthony "Ziggy" Johnson – mastering
- Cary E. Mansfield – audio production
- Ron Modra – cover photo
- Bill Pitzonka – art direction
- Rex Schnelle – mixing, producer
- Mike Toppins – mixing, producer

== Release history ==
Region	Date	Format	Label	Ref.
United States	June 14, 2005	Compact disc; music download	TWI Records; Varèse Sarabande	
