= Ninety-Nine (song) =

Single by Bill Anderson
- B-side: "Back Where I Started From"
- Released: June 1959
- Recorded: April 1959
- Studio: Bradley Studios (Nashville, Tennessee)
- Genre: Country; Nashville Sound
- Length: 2:28
- Label: Decca
- Songwriter: Bill Anderson
- Producer: Owen Bradley

Bill Anderson singles chronology
| "That's What It's Like to Be Lonesome" (1958) | "Ninety-Nine" (1959) | "Dead or Alive" (1959) |

"Ninety-Nine" is a song written and recorded by American country singer-songwriter Bill Anderson. It was released as a single in June 1959 via Decca Records and became a major hit.

== Background and release ==
"Ninety-Nine" was recorded in April 1959 at the Bradley Studios, located in Nashville, Tennessee. The sessions were produced by Owen Bradley, who would serve as Anderson's producer through most of years with Decca Records.

"Ninety-Nine" was released as a single by Decca Records in June 1959. It spent a total of 19 weeks on the Billboard Hot Country and Western Sides chart before reaching number 13 in August 1959. It was Anderson's second chart hit and second major hit as a recording artist. It was not first released on a proper album. However, seven years later, it appeared on his compilation Bill Anderson Sings Country Heart Songs.

== Track listings ==
7" vinyl single

- "Ninety-Nine" – 2:28
- "Back Where I Started From" – 2:35

== Chart performance ==
| Chart (1959) | Peak position |
|---|---|
| US Hot Country Songs (Billboard) | 13 |
