= Dead or Alive (Bill Anderson song) =

Single by Bill Anderson
- B-side: "It's Not the End of Everything"
- Released: October 1959
- Recorded: September 1959
- Studio: Bradley Studios (Nashville, Tennessee)
- Genre: Country; Nashville Sound
- Length: 2:35
- Label: Decca
- Songwriter: Bill Anderson
- Producer: Owen Bradley

Bill Anderson singles chronology
"Ninety-Nine" (1958)	"Dead or Alive" (1959)	"The Tip of My Fingers" (1960)

"Dead or Alive" is a song written and recorded by American country singer-songwriter Bill Anderson. It was released as a single in October 1959 via Decca Records and became a major hit.

== Background and release ==
"Dead or Alive" was recorded in September 1959 at the Bradley Studios, located in Nashville, Tennessee. The sessions were produced by Owen Bradley, who would serve as Anderson's producer through most of years with Decca Records.

"Dead or Alive" was released as a single by Decca Records in October 1959. It spent a total of eight weeks on the Billboard Hot Country and Western Sides chart before reaching number 19 in February 1960. It was Anderson's third chart hit and third major hit as a recording artist. The song was not issued on a proper album following its release.

== Track listings ==
7" vinyl single

- "Dead or Alive" – 2:35
- "It's Not the End of Everything" – 2:37

== Chart performance ==
Chart (1959–1960)	Peak position
US Hot Country Songs (Billboard)	19
