= Country Music Heaven =

Studio album by Bill Anderson
- Released: February 1993
- Studios: Bradley's Barn, Mount Juliet, Tennessee; Hilltop, Nashville, Tennessee
- Genres: Country; gospel
- Length: 35:57
- Label: Curb
- Producer: Mike Johnson

Bill Anderson chronology
A Place in the Country (1986)	Country Music Heaven (1993)	Greatest Songs (1996)

Singles from Country Music Heaven
- 1. "Country Music Heaven" Released: 1992

Country Music Heaven is a studio album by American country singer-songwriter Bill Anderson. It was released in February 1993 on Curb Records and was produced by Mike Johnson. His 34th studio album, the project also marked Anderson's second release for the Curb label. The album was a collection of gospel recordings, which totaled to 12 tracks.

== Background, content and release ==
Country Music Heaven was recorded in two separate locations: the Hilltop Studio (located in Nashville, Tennessee) and Bradley's Barn (located in Mount Juliet, Tennessee). The sessions were produced by Mike Johnson, Anderson's band leader in his touring band. Johnson had produced some of Anderson's previous album releases. Country Music Heaven was Anderson's second album for the Curb label, with his first being a compilation set issued in 1991. The project was a collection of 12 gospel music recordings.

It was Anderson's second album of gospel recordings. He was inspired to record the cut because his grandfather was a Methodist preacher. Anderson often performed many of the songs featured on the collection in church gatherings. Two of the album's track were new compositions by Anderson himself: "Footprints in the Sand" and "Serenity Prayer". Additional tracks were cover versions of traditional gospel and inspirational songs. Country Music Heaven was released in February 1993 on Curb Records, becoming his 34th studio recording. The project was issued as a cassette and compact disc. The album's title track was released as a single in 1992, receiving a review from Billboard, which compared the song to that of Garth Brooks. The album itself was reviewed by Allmusic, who only gave the release 2.5 out of 3 possible stars.

== Track listing ==
=== CD version ===
Country Music Heaven
No.	Title	Writer(s)	Length
1.	"Drinking from My Saucer"	Mike Johnson	2:57
2.	"The Touch of the Master's Hand"	Tex Ritter; Myra Brooks Welch	3:15
3.	"I Said a Prayer for You Today"	Johnson	0:47
4.	"Friends"	Glen Campbell; Don Bowman	2:12
5.	"Ol' Doc Brown"	Red Foley	5:05
6.	"Country Music Heaven"	Eddie Dean; Hall Southern	3:57
7.	"Footprints in the Sand"	Bill Anderson	3:38
8.	"One Solitary Life"	Johnson	2:52
9.	"Trouble in the Amen Corner"	Archie Campbell	3:07
10.	"The Farmer and the Lord"	Jim Wilson	3:23
11.	"The Serenity Prayer"	Anderson	1:00
12.	"Whispering Hope"	Debbie Mathis	3:53

=== Cassette version ===
Side one
No.	Title	Writer(s)	Length
1.	"Drinking from My Saucer"	Johnson	2:57
2.	"The Touch of the Master's Hand"	Ritter; Welch	3:15
3.	"I Said a Prayer for You Today"	Johnson	0:47
4.	"Friends"	Campbell; Bowman	2:12
5.	"Ol' Doc Brown"	Foley	5:05
6.	"Country Music Heaven"	Dean; Southern	3:57

Side two
No.	Title	Writer(s)	Length
1.	"Footprints in the Sand"	Anderson	3:38
2.	"One Solitary Life"	Johnson	2:52
3.	"Trouble in the Amen Corner"	Campbell	3:07
4.	"The Farmer and the Lord"	Wilson	3:23
5.	"The Serenity Prayer"	Anderson	1:00
6.	"Whispering Hope"	Mathis	3:53

== Personnel ==
All credits are adapted from the liner notes of Country Music Heaven.

Musical personnel

- Bill Anderson – lead vocals
- Kelly Black – guitar
- Gene Chrisman – drums
- Greg Dotson – drums
- Glen Duncan – fiddle, mandolin
- Lee Hilliard – background vocals
- Dirk Johnson – keyboards, piano
- Kirk Johnson – harmonica
- Mike Johnson – dobro, steel guitar
- Roger Morris – piano
- Larry Paxton – electric bass, upright bass
- Michael Severs – acoustic guitar, electric guitar
- Lester Earl Singer – acoustic guitar, dobro

Technical personnel

- Bill Anderson – arrangement
- Dennis Carney – photography
- Mike Johnson – producer
- Don Ovens – liner notes

== Release history ==
Region	Date	Format	Label	Ref.
United States	February 1993	Cassette	Curb Records	
United States	February 1993	Compact disc	Curb Records	
