= Fine Wine (Bill Anderson album) =

Studio album by Bill Anderson
- Released: August 25, 1998
- Studios: Sound Emporium (Nashville, Tennessee
- Genre: Country
- Length: 44:39
- Label: Warner Bros.
- Producers: Caryn Wariner; Steve Wariner

Bill Anderson chronology
Greatest Songs (1996)	Fine Wine (1998)	A Lot of Things Different (2001)

Fine Wine is a studio album by American country singer-songwriter Bill Anderson. It was released on August 25, 1998, via Warner Bros. Records. It was co-produced by Caryn and Steve Wariner. Fine Wine was Anderson's 36th studio album as a recording artist and his first major-label release since the 1980s. The project consisted of 11 tracks that received mixed reception from music journalists and writers.

== Background and content ==
In 1998, Anderson was signed to Warner Bros. Records as part of a veterans artists project. Other performers were also signed to the roster in hopes of restarting their music careers. This included performers Ronnie Milsap, Connie Smith and Don Williams. "I definitely think there's a segment of the country music audience that's not being sung too. Hopefully this will help fill a little bit of that void," Anderson commented in 1998. The major-label project was recorded at Sound Emporium Studios, located in Nashville, Tennessee. The project was produced by country artist Steve Wariner, along with his wife, Caryn Wariner. Anderson was inspired to work with Wariner based on his reworking of Anderson's "The Tip of My Fingers". "...it was a wake-up call," he recalled in 1998.

Fine Wine consisted of 11 tracks, all of which were composed (or co-composed) by Anderson himself. The project included a re-recording of Anderson's hit "The Tip of My Fingers". Instead of being a solo cut, the song featured vocals from the other country artists who had hit versions of the song themselves. The artists included on the track were Eddy Arnold, Roy Clark, Jean Shepard and Wariner. Other tracks range from ballads to novelty numbers. One novelty tune included was the track "My Van", which was written with Gary Nicholson and Steve Wariner.

== Release and reception ==
Fine Wine was released on August 25, 1998, via Warner Bros. Records. It was Anderson's 36th studio album released in his recording career. Upon its release, the project did not make any appearances on the Billboard album surveys, including the Top Country Albums chart. Deborah Evans Price of Billboard positively reviewed the album. In her review, Price compared Anderson's career and album in comparison to the album's title: "Fine Wine".

John Weisberger of Country Standard Time also gave the album a positive reception. He called the collection a set of "vintage Anderson creations", highlighting several of the album's tracks for its wide array of musical styles. Weisberger also was pleased to Anderson recording new music again. "It's a rare song that can chart in three different decades, but that's the kind of writer – and singer – Anderson is. It's good to have him back in the studio again," he said.

== Track listings ==
=== CD and digital versions ===
All tracks written by Bill Anderson, with additional writers noted.

Fine Wine (1998)
No.	Title	Writer(s)	Length
1.	"A Good Love and a Bottle of Wine"		3:45
2.	"The Paper"	Hal Ketchum	3:46
3.	"My Van"	Gary Nicholson; Steve Wariner	5:34
4.	"The Tips of My Fingers" (with Roy Clark, Eddy Arnold, Jean Shepard and Steve Wariner)		4:07
5.	"Forgiveness"	Wariner	4:03
6.	"Way Too Much Time on His Hands"	Jim McBride	3:38
7.	"Twenty Years"	Nicholson	4:31
8.	"No Fair Falling in Love"	Nicholson	3:44
9.	"Before"	Sharon Rice; Wariner	3:29
10.	"It Feels So Good (To Feel So Right)"	Lee Ann Womack; Mark Wright	3:20
11.	"Now That's Love"	Jim Weatherly	4:42

== Personnel ==
All credits are adapted from Allmusic and the liner notes of Fine Wine.

Musical personnel

- Bill Anderson – lead vocals, liner notes
- Eddy Arnold – guest vocals
- Danny Bailey – background vocals
- Lea Jane Berinati – background vocals
- Clint Black – guest vocals, harmonica
- Roy Clark – guest vocals
- Jana King Evans – background vocals
- Gregg Galbraith – acoustic guitar
- Ron Gannaway – drums
- Sonny Garrish – dobro, steel guitar
- Randy Goodrum – keyboards
- Carl Jackson – acoustic guitar

- John Jarvis – piano
- Mike Johnson – steel guitar
- Woody Lingle – bass
- Jimmy Nails – slide guitar
- Jon Randall – background vocals
- Hargus "Pig" Robbins – piano
- Gail Rudisill Johnson – fiddle
- Jean Shepard – guest vocals
- Lisa Silver – background vocals
- Gary W. Smith – keyboards, piano
- Steve Wariner – background vocals, acoustic guitar, electric guitar
- Andrea Zonn – background vocals

Technical personnel

- Randy Gardner – engineering
- Jim McGuire – photography
- Denny Purcell – mastering
- Cheryl Riddle – hairstylist, make-up
- Garrett Rittenberry – art direction, design
- Caryn Wariner – producer
- Steve Wariner – producer

== Release history ==
Region	Date	Format	Label	Ref.
United States	August 25, 1998	Cassette	Warner Bros. Records	
United States	August 25, 1998	Compact disc	Warner Bros. Records	
United States	2010s	Music download	Warner Bros. Records	
