= Christmas (Bill Anderson album) =

Studio album by Bill Anderson
- Released: November 1969
- Recorded: October 1969
- Studios: Bradley's Barn, Mount Juliet, Tennessee
- Genres: Country; Nashville Sound; Christmas
- Label: Decca
- Producer: Owen Bradley

Bill Anderson chronology
My Life/But You Know I Love You (1969)	Christmas (1969)	If It's All the Same to You (1970)

Christmas is a studio album by American country singer-songwriter Bill Anderson. It was released in November 1969 on Decca Records and was produced by Owen Bradley. Christmas was Anderson's twelfth studio recording and also his first album of Christmas music. It was also his second studio album released in 1969.

== Background, content and release ==
Christmas was recorded in October 1969 in sessions produced by Owen Bradley. It would be Anderson's twelfth studio album and twelfth to be produced by Bradley. The sessions were held at Bradley's Barn studio in Mount Juliet, Tennessee. The album consisted of nine tracks, which was unlike his previous albums which included 11–12 songs per set.

Nearly all of the album's tracks were cover versions of notable Christmas and holiday tunes. Among these covers was songs such as Elvis Presley's "Blue Christmas" and the traditional song "Silent Night". Also contained in the album were two medleys of holiday songs. These tracks were featured on side two of the record. Two tracks on the album were new recordings composed by Anderson himself. One of these recordings was the fifth track, "Po' Folks Christmas", a holiday version of his original country music hit, "Po' Folks".

Christmas was released on Decca Records in November 1969, his second studio effort released that year. It was released as a vinyl LP, containing six songs on side one and three on side two. Upon its release, Christmas did not make any Billboard music publication charts.

== Track listing ==
Side one
No.	Title	Writer(s)	Length
1.	"Christmas Time's A-Comin'"	Tex Logan	2:13
2.	"Blue Christmas"	Billy Hayes; Jay W. Johnson	2:43
3.	"Santa Claus Is Comin' to Town"	J. Fred Coots; Haven Gillespie	2:05
4.	"Silver Bells"	Ray Evans; Jay Livingston	2:22
5.	"Po' Folks Christmas"	Bill Anderson	3:06
6.	"My Christmas List Grows Shorter Every Year"	Anderson	3:32

Side two
No.	Title	Writer(s)	Length
1.	"Medley" ("O Holy Night", "O Little Town of Bethlehem", "Away in a Manger")	Traditional	3:08
2.	"Medley" ("Joy to the World", "Hark! The Herald Angels Sing", "O Come All Ye Faithful")	Traditional	2:10
3.	"Silent Night"	Joseph Mohr; Franz Xaver Gruber	3:14

== Personnel ==
All credits are adapted from the liner notes of My Life/But You Know I Love You.

Musical personnel

- Bill Anderson – lead vocals
- Harold Bradley – guitar
- Dottie Dillard – background vocals
- Roy Huskey – bass
- The Jordanaires – background vocals
- Millie Kirkham – background vocals
- Jimmy Lance – guitar
- Grady Martin – guitar
- Len Miller – drums
- Hal Rugg – steel guitar
- Jerry Smith – piano, vibes
- Jimmy Woodard – organ

Technical personnel

- Owen Bradley – record producer

== Release history ==
Region	Date	Format	Label	Ref.
United States	November 1969	Vinyl	Decca	
Canada	November 1969	Vinyl	Decca	
