= Krystal (restaurant) =

Fast food burger chain in the Southeastern US

Krystal Restaurants, LLC.

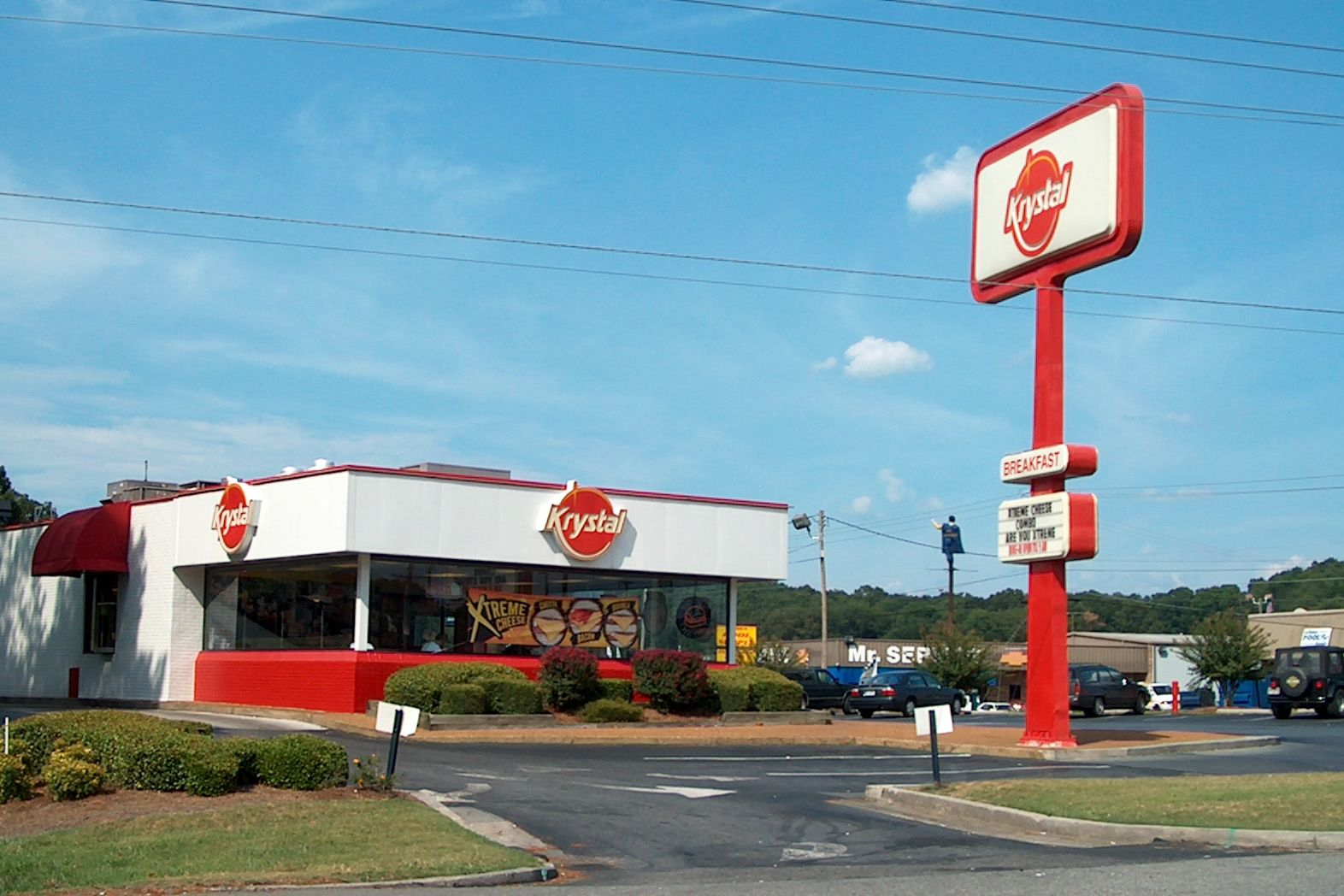
- A Krystal restaurant in Calhoun, Georgia
- Trade name: Krystal
- Type: Subsidiary
- Industry: Fast Food
- Founded: October 24, 1932; 93 years ago in Chattanooga, Tennessee
- Founders: Rody Davenport, Jr. J. Glenn Sherrill
- Headquarters: Dunwoody, Georgia
- Number of locations: 360
- Areas served: United States
- Key people: Josh Kern, (CEO); Casey Terrell (CMO); Jessica Hagler (CFO)
- Products: Fast food, including hamburgers, French fries, hot dogs, chicken, milkshakes, and breakfast offerings
- Number of employees: 6,500+
- Parent: SPB Hospitality
- Website: krystal.com

Krystal is an American regional fast food restaurant chain headquartered in Dunwoody, Georgia, with restaurants primarily in the Southeastern United States. It is known for its small, square hamburgers, called sliders in places other than the Southeast, with steamed-in onions. Krystal moved its headquarters from Chattanooga, Tennessee, where it had been based since 1932, to the Atlanta suburb of Dunwoody in early 2013.

== History ==
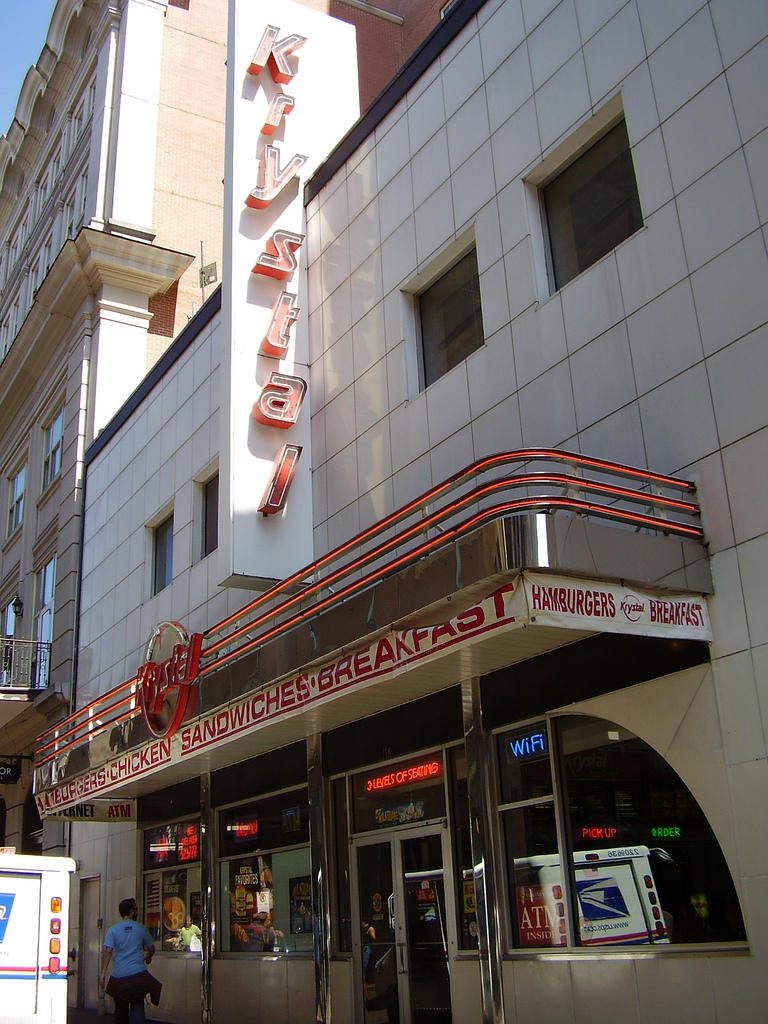
A Krystal restaurant in the French Quarter, New Orleans

Founded on October 24, 1932, in Chattanooga, Tennessee, during the first years of the Great Depression, entrepreneur Rody Davenport Jr. and partner J. Glenn Sherrill theorized that even in a severe economic upheaval, "People would patronize a restaurant that was kept spotlessly clean, where they could get a good meal with courteous service at the lowest possible price." The restaurant's first customer, French Jenkins, ordered six "Krystals" and a cup of coffee, all for the price of 35¢ ($8.20 in 2025's dollars), thus proving their theory true according to the company's own keeping of history.

Davenport had visited Chicago's White Castle restaurants, taking notes of successful features, before setting forth on his own venture. Davenport and Sherrill set up the first Krystal at the corner of 7th and Cherry Streets in Chattanooga. The first Krystal was a modular building constructed in Chicago and shipped to Chattanooga for final installation. The oldest Krystal still in operation is located on Cherokee Boulevard in Chattanooga's Northshore District. Krystal is the seventh or eighth-oldest hamburger chain in the United States (the oldest being White Castle) and the oldest in the South.

Regarding the origins of the Krystal name, company legend states that Davenport and his wife were riding down a mountain road when Mrs. Mary McGee Davenport saw a lawn ornament in the shape of a crystal ball. While gazing at the lawn ornament, Mrs. Davenport commented that since Davenport and Sherrill felt cleanliness was a cornerstone of the concept, they should name the restaurant Crystal for "clean as a crystal"—yet with a "K" to add a little twist. Krystal's restaurants through the years often sported a crystal ball on the top.

From the early 1930s through the early 1960s, the chain served much of its food not in take-out containers but on inexpensive porcelain dishes with the "Krystal" moniker. The waiters and waitresses wore white uniforms, and food was offered through counter service. In the 1950s, Krystal opened its first drive-through window, which most locations maintain today. A 2013 study of seven fast food franchises found that service at Krystal drive-throughs was the slowest, with an average wait time of 218 seconds. It was, however, the most accurate in terms of fulfilling orders.

In the 1950s, cake doughnuts were served as a breakfast and dessert item. From about 1970 until 1986, "bone-in" kettle fried chicken and related sides were offered. These items were sometimes sold from a stand-alone addition to the hamburger restaurants.

DavCo, a division of Krystal, operated Wendy's franchises from the 1960s until 2017, when the franchises were bought back by Wendy's and sold to NPC International. Between 1983 and 1988, DavCo also operated the Po' Folks family restaurant chain.

== Current business ==
Map showing the states with locations of Krystal restaurants in red, along with states with locations of White Castle in blue. States with both Krystal and White Castle are colored purple.

Krystal restaurants, both company-owned and franchised, operate in Alabama, Florida, Georgia, Kentucky, Louisiana, Mississippi, New Jersey, South Carolina, North Carolina, New Jersey, Tennessee, and Arkansas. Krystal has also operated several restaurants in Texas over the years. It is often compared to the northern restaurant chain White Castle, and other than the South Central Kentucky and Nashville, Tennessee markets, the two restaurants' market areas do not generally overlap.

Krystal maintained its corporate headquarters in Chattanooga from 1932 to 2013. In the late 1990s, Krystal emerged from a bankruptcy proceeding and a sale of assets that placed majority ownership outside the heirs of the founding families. Port Royal Holdings, Inc. owned the chain from 1997 to 2012, expanding the chain to a peak of over 420 locations in 11 states in 2002, before downsizing and closing dozens of locations. It was owned by Argonne Capital Group from 2012 until 2020 when Fortress Investment Group LLC and its operating partner, Golden Child Holdings acquired Krystal. On April 28, 2023, Krystal was acquired by SPB Hospitality.

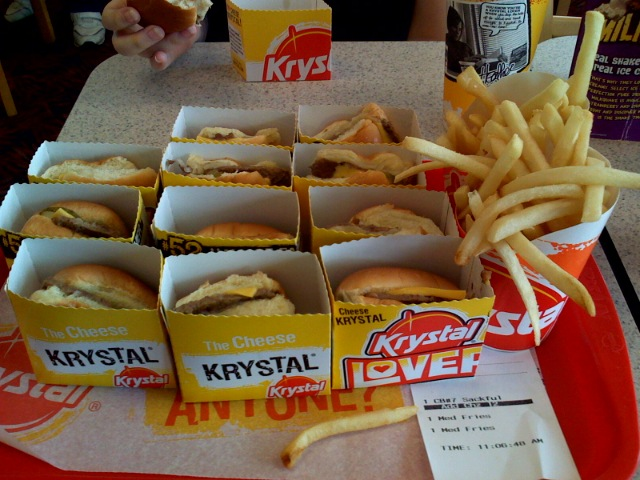
A tray of Krystal burgers and french fries

Krystal's product line centers on a square hamburger patty slider with a steamed bun, together with diced onions, pickle, and mustard, and collectively called a "Krystal". Small hot dogs called "pups" are also featured menu items. The chain has occasionally expanded its menu to include larger burgers, such as the "Big Angus Burger", a full-size hamburger made of 100% Angus beef.

Krystal is known for a diverse breakfast menu, which includes a made-to-order country breakfast, meat and egg sandwiches, and biscuits, as well as other items. One particularly popular breakfast item is the Scrambler, which includes a layered stack of scrambled eggs, sausage, grits, and cheese served in a styrofoam cup. Other variations of the Scrambler also feature pancakes, sausage gravy, or southwestern-style spices.

In 1998, Krystal introduced the Krystal Chik, a fried chicken breast filet slider served on the signature steamed square bun. Krystal Chiks are extremely popular, along with other chicken, chili, and dessert items. Krystal continues to focus on their core menu products, but is also in the process of redesigning and upgrading their stores to appeal to a mobile and multi-tasking audience.

In the mid-2000s, Krystal tested a prototype for a new high-tech drive-in featuring individual television monitors for ordering and watching television (audio accessed via car stereo), and indoor and outdoor seating areas with multiple big-screen television monitors and free digital jukeboxes.

On January 19, 2020, Krystal filed for Chapter 11 bankruptcy protection, citing "shifting consumer tastes and preferences, growth in labor and commodity costs, increased competition, and unfavorable lease terms" in the filing. Many restaurants abandoned in-room dining nearly two months later to combat the COVID-19 pandemic.

On November 23, 2022, Krystal entered the Puerto Rico market. This location has since closed.

In June 2026, Krystal expanded into the Northeastern United States with the signing of a franchise agreement with former New York Giants wide receiver Victor Cruz, opening a location in Union, New Jersey.

== Competitive eating ==
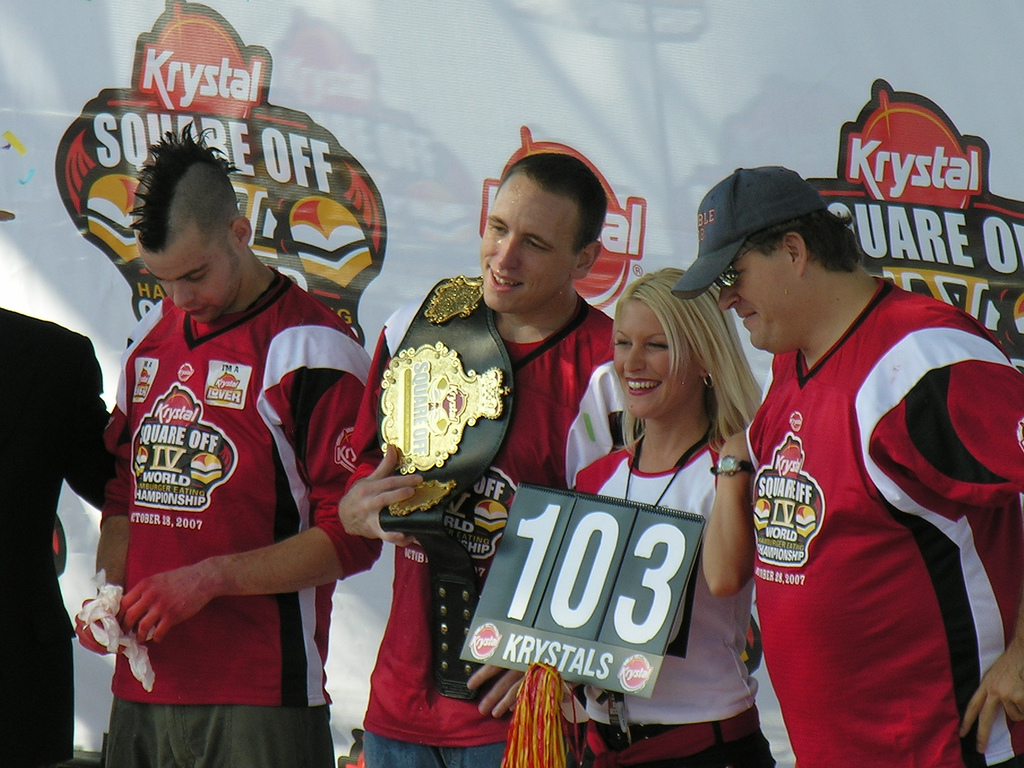
Joey Chestnut ate a record 103 Krystal hamburgers in eight minutes at the Krystal Square Off in 2007 and celebrates with Patrick Bertoletti (left), "Krystal Kitty", and Bob Shoudt (right).

Krystal restaurants were the host of the Krystal Square Off, a competitive eating contest, from 2004 to 2009. The current world record is 103 Krystal burgers consumed in eight minutes by Joey Chestnut, set at the 2007 competition.

== See also ==
- List of hamburger restaurants
- List of hot dog restaurants
