= Fandango (game show) =

American game show

- Genre: Game show
- Created by: Allen Reid; Elmer Alley
- Presented by: Bill Anderson
- Starring: Blake Pickett (1987–1989)
- Announcer: Bill Robinson as "Edgar, the Talking Jukebox"
- Country of origin: United States

Production
- Executive producers: Allen Reid; Mady Land; C. Paul Corbin for TNN
- Production locations: Opryland USA; Nashville, Tennessee
- Running time: ~22 minutes
- Production company: Reid/Land Productions

Original release
- Network: TNN
- Release: March 8, 1983 – March 31, 1989

Fandango is an American television game show that aired on TNN from March 8, 1983, to August 26, 1988, with reruns airing through March 31, 1989, when it was replaced by Top Card. Contestants competed to answer trivia questions about country music. The show was hosted by country music singer Bill Anderson, who was joined by Blake Pickett as co-host in 1987. Disc jockey Bill Robinson served as announcer and the voice of the show's setpiece, an oversized jukebox named "Edgar, the Talking Jukebox".

== Gameplay ==
=== Main game ===
Three contestants (including a returning champion) answered country music questions to win prizes. The returning champion stood behind the blue podium and his/her two challengers stood at red and yellow podiums. Game categories were presented on the show's setpiece, an oversized jukebox named "Edgar, the Talking Jukebox".

==== 1983 ====
In round one, Anderson asked a toss-up question to all three contestants worth 10 points. Whoever buzzed-in with the right answer wagered any or all of his/her score and chose one of nine categories. The center category was always the "Star of the Day". A correct answer added the wager to his/her score and a wrong answer deducted it. Later in the run, a "Secret Square" was shown to the home audience, and if chosen, it would double the wager for a correct answer. Gameplay continued until time expired or until all nine categories were used. In round two, toss-ups were worth 20 points, but overall gameplay remained the same.

Some questions had a bonus prize attached to them, which Edgar would mention prior to the question.

==== 1987 ====
The game started with a 10-point toss-up question. The first contestant to buzz in and answer correctly won the points and chose from one of eight categories for bonus points, worth from 20 to 100 points. If the contestant answered the bonus question correctly, he/she won the points. If the contestant was incorrect, whichever opponent currently had the lower score had a chance to answer and steal the points. If the contestant with the lowest score missed, the third contestant was given a chance to respond. If the two opponents were tied, the question became a toss-up between them. Round two was played the same way as round one, except that the point values were then doubled.

In the middle of each round, Edgar, the Talking Jukebox would interrupt the game, usually with a joke, and then announce a bonus prize, to be awarded to the contestant who answered the next question correctly.

==== Final question ====
Each round ended with one final question. Originally, it was played for 50 points in both rounds, and all three contestants answered by writing their response on a card. In the second round, 50 points were taken away for a wrong answer. Starting in 1987, if the difference was less than 200 points between two or all three contestants, the final question was worth +/- 100 points. If a contestant led by more than 200 points, the final question was not played since the difference was not enough to catch the leader.

The championship went to whoever had the highest score at the end of the game, winning a prize and advancing to the bonus round. If the game ended in a tie, one final toss-up question was asked. If a contestant had at least 1,000 points in the first four seasons, the podium would read 999, but Bill would tell the contestant's actual score, as the scoreboards in the first four seasons could only display three digits. However in 1987, the scoreboards displayed four digits.

=== Bonus Round ("Meet the Stars") ===
In the bonus round, the champion tried to predict celebrities' answers given in taped interviews. Originally, the Star of the Day was the only celebrity featured in the interviews, but beginning in 1987, four different celebrities were featured.

Anderson read a question (e.g., "When you do a concert or an on-stage performance, what song is most requested by the audience?") with two possible answers, and the contestant guessed what answer the celebrity gave. For each correct answer, the contestant won an increasingly valuable prize. If incorrect, the game ended, and the contestant lost all prizes accumulated to that point; however, the contestant could quit at any time and keep what he/she had already won. If the contestant answered all four questions correctly, he/she won the grand prize of a vacation. If the contestant missed the first question, he/she could still win the first prize by answering the question from the second celebrity (no additional prizes could be won), but if the second question is missed, the round ended in a loss, and the contestant was awarded a consolation prize.

Beginning in 1987, the champion was shown an eight-numbered board from which he/she selected prizes for the first three questions. For the fourth question, Pickett presented eight sealed envelopes containing the names of different grand prizes, which included cars, a boat, a fur coat, and vacations. After choosing an envelope (most commonly number 7), the contestant could elect to risk what he/she had already won to win the bonus prize by opening the envelope and revealing the grand prize, or return the envelope and select a fourth prize from the board without having to answer an additional question. Any contestant who won the grand prize retired from the show. If a contestant won five consecutive days, he/she was automatically awarded the grand prize regardless of the outcome of the bonus round.

In some cases, Anderson would participate as the Star of the Day, during which Edgar would host the bonus round. In other cases, during celebrity shows with country music stars, the round was reversed, and the stars would guess how former contestants responded to various questions. The fans involved won prizes based on how well the star had done in the round. Beginning in 1987, a variety of different stars (which included then-current country stars, country music legends, country-oriented comedians, and stars from popular Nashville Network shows) played the bonus round, and Anderson would tell the contestant the star's name to help him or her decide whether to continue or stop.

For at least the first two seasons, the show had a celebrity tournament with country stars playing. The show donated a cash prize to charity on each celeb's behalf. The winner of the main game played the bonus and the prizes went to a civilian, in some cases a former contestant. The winners of the first three games came back on day four for the finals. Johnny Russell won at least the first two years of the tourney.
