= Madacy Lifestyle Marketing =

Canadian media publisher

- Formerly: Madacy Music Group (1980–1995); Madacy Entertainment (1995–2010)
- Type: Privately held
- Industry: Manufacturing
- Founded: 1980; 46 years ago
- Founder: Amos Alter
- Defunct: 2018
- Headquarters: Montreal, Quebec, Canada
- Key people: Amos Alter (CEO); Hillel Frankel (Executive vice president); David Alter (Legal/Executive)
- Products: Digital distribution, digital marketing, and music licensing
- Owner: Madacy Entertainment Group, Inc.
- Number of employees: 50-200
- Website: madacylife.com

Madacy Lifestyle Marketing (formerly Madacy Entertainment) was a company based in Mount Royal, Quebec, that published DVDs, CDs and VHS tapes. Most of the products were frequently seen in many discount stores in the United States and Canada, often at low retail prices, as compared to releases by major labels. It was owned by the Canadian investment company Clarke, who bought the company in 2008.

Many of their releases are taken from public domain sources. Some of the songs on their albums are cover versions, either recorded by the original singers themselves, The Wonder Kids Choir, or by Madacy's in-house performers, the Countdown Singers.
