= Po' Folks (Bill Anderson song) =

Single by Bill Anderson
- B-side: "Goodbye Cruel World"
- Released: June 1961
- Recorded: April 24, 1961
- Studio: Bradley Studios (Nashville, Tennessee)
- Genre: Country; Nashville Sound
- Length: 2:50
- Label: Decca
- Songwriter: Bill Anderson
- Producer: Owen Bradley

Bill Anderson singles chronology
"Walk Out Backwards" (1960)	"Po' Folks" (1961)	"Get a Little Dirt on Your Hands" (1962)

"Po' Folks" is a song written and recorded by American country singer-songwriter Bill Anderson. It was released as a single in June 1961 via Decca Records and became a major hit.

== Background and release ==
"Po' Folks" was recorded on April 24, 1961 at the Bradley Studios, located in Nashville, Tennessee. Three additional tracks were recorded in the same sessions, including the song's B-side, "Goodbye Cruel World." The recording session featured The Nashville A-Team of musicians, including Floyd Cramer, Buddy Harman and Grady Martin. The sessions were produced by Owen Bradley, who would serve as Anderson's producer through most of years with Decca Records.

== Release and chart performance ==
"Po' Folks" was released as a single by Decca Records in June 1960. It spent a total of 14 weeks on the Billboard Hot Country and Western Sides chart before reaching number nine in February 1960. It was Anderson's second top ten hit as a recording artist. His first was his previous single release "Walk Out Backwards." The song was not issued on a proper album following its release. However, it was later released on his 1962 compilation entitled Bill Anderson Sings Country Heart Songs. The album featured his biggest hits for the first several years of his recording career.

== Legacy ==
"Po' Folks" has been considered among Anderson's signature recordings of his career. Bobby Moore of Wide Open Country called it a "legendary single [that] spoke for all of the Southern baby boomers raised with numerous siblings in sharecropping families." The Boot rated it among Anderson's "top 10" best songs in his career. It helped inspire the name for the Po' Folks restaurant chain. It also helped establish Anderson as a singer-songwriter in the country field. As Anderson developed his own touring show, he named his backing band "The Po' Folks Band" (also called "The Po' Boys"). Over the years the band shared credit on several albums of Anderson's as well. To this day, the name serves as Anderson's backing group.

== Track listings ==
7" vinyl single

- "Po' Folks" – 2:50
- "Goodbye Cruel World" – 2:35

== Chart performance ==
Chart (1961)	Peak position
US Hot Country Songs (Billboard)	9
