= Billboard Top Country Singles of 1966 =

This is a list of Billboard magazine's ranking of the top country singles of 1966.

"Swinging Doors" by Merle Haggard ranked as the year's No. 1 single, despite its having peaked at No. 5 on the weekly charts.

"Almost Persuaded" by David Houston, which spent a record nine weeks in the No. 1 spot, ranked as the year's No.2 single.

Rank	Peak (Note: This column recites the record's peak position on Billboard's weekly charts.)	Title	Artist(s)	Label
1	1	"Swinging Doors"	Merle Haggard	Capitol
2	1	"Almost Persuaded"	David Houston	Epic
3	4	"I Love You Drops"	Bill Anderson	Decca
4	2	"You Ain't Woman Enough (To Take My Man)"	Loretta Lynn	Decca
5	1	"Think of Me"	Buck Owens	Capitol
6	2	"Tippy Toeing"	The Harden Trio	Columbia
7	1	"Take Good Care of Her"	Sonny James	Capitol
8	2	"Don't Touch Me"	Jeannie Seely	Monument
9	1	"Distant Drums"	Jim Reeves	RCA Victor
10	5	"Would You Hold It Against Me"	Dottie West	RCA Victor
11	2	"A Million and One"	Billy Walker	Monument
12	1	"Waitin' in Your Welfare Line"	Buck Owens	Capitol
13	1	"I Want to Go with You"	Eddy Arnold	RCA Victor
14	1	"Blue Side of Lonesome"	Jim Reeves	RCA Victor
15	2	"Room in Your Heart"	Sonny James	Capitol
16	5	"Streets of Baltimore"	Bobby Bare	RCA Victor
17	2	"The One on the Right Is on the Left"	Johnny Cash	Columbia
18	1	"Giddyup Go"	Red Sovine	Starday
19	5	"Evil on Your Mind"	Jan Howard	Decca
20	2	"Snowflake"	Jim Reeves	RCA Victor
21	5	"Standing in the Shadows"	Hank Williams, Jr.	M-G-M
22	8	"The Lovin' Machine"	Johnny Paycheck	Little Darlin
23	3	"Talkin' to the Wall"	Warner Mack	Decca
24	3	"The Shoe Goes On the Other Foot Tonight"	Marty Robbins	Columbia
25	1	"Open Up Your Heart"	Buck Owens	Capitol
26	3	"The Bottle Let Me Down"	Merle Haggard	Capitol
27	1	"I Get the Fever"	Bill Anderson	Decca
28	2	"Ain't Had No Lovin'	Connie Smith	RCA Victor
29	6	"Put It Off Until Tomorrow"	Bill Phillips	Decca
30	7	"A Way to Survive"	Ray Price	Columbia
31	4	"Nobody But a Fool (Would Love You)"	Connie Smith	RCA Victor
32	2	"The Last Word in Lonesome Is Me"	Eddy Arnold	RCA Victor
33	6	"I'm a People"	George Jones	Musicor
34	3	"True Love's a Blessing"	Sonny James	Capitol
35	6	"(Yes) I'm Hurting"	Don Gibson	RCA Victor
36	3	"Skid Row Joe"	Porter Wagoner	RCA Victor
37	8	"Someone Before Me	The Wilburn Brothers	Decca
38	3	"The Tip of My Fingers"	Eddy Arnold	RCA Victor
39	7	"Baby"	Wilma Burgess	Decca
40	8	"The Company You Keep"	Bill Phillips	Decca
41	12	"Don't Touch Me"	Wilma Burgess	Decca
42	10	"If Teardrops Were Silver"	Jean Shepard	Capitol
43	2	"History Repeats Itself"	Buddy Starcher	Boone
44	4	"It Takes a Lot of Money"	Warner Mack	Decca
45	7	"Walking on New Grass"	Kenny Price	Boone
46	4	"What Kinda Deal Is This"	Bill Carlisle	Hickory
47	2	"Flowers on the Wall"	The Statler Brothers	Columbia
48	9	"I'm Living in Two Worlds"	Bonnie Guitar	Dot
49	4	"Dear Uncle Sam"	Loretta Lynn	Decca
50	5	"Four-O-Thirty-Three"	George Jones	Musicor
51	2	"The Ballad of the Green Berets"	Barry Sadler	RCA Victor
52	5	"Husbands and Wives"	Roger Miller	Smash
53	9	"(That's What You Get) For Lovin' Me"	Waylon Jennings	RCA Victor
54	10	"Back Pocket Money"	Jimmy C. Newman	Decca
55	13	"At Ease Heart"	Ernest Ashworth	Hickory
56	4	"Sweet Thang"	Nat Stuckey	Paula
57		"Make the World Go Away"	Eddy Arnold	RCA Victor
58	9	"Early Morning Rain"	George Hamilton IV	RCA Victor
59	10	"The World Is Round"	Roy Drusky	Mercury
60	9	"I'll Take the Dog"	Jean Shepard and Ray Pillow	Capitol
61	15	"Steel Rail Blues"	George Hamilton IV	RCA Victor
62	13	"Many Happy Hangovers to You"	Jean Shepard	Capitol
63	6	"Almost Persuaded No. 2"	Ben Colder	M-G-M
64		"Born to Be in Love with You"	Van Trevor	Band Box
65	15	"Stop the Start (Of Tears in My Heart)"	Johnny Dollar	Columbia
66	7	"If You Can't Bite, Don't Growl"	Tommy Collins	Columbia
67	3	"Sittin' On a Rock (Crying in a Creek)"	Warner Mack	Decca
68	11	"Golden Guitar	Bill Anderson	Decca
69		"It's Only Love"	Jeannie Seely	Monument
70	12	"Blues Plus Booze (Means I Lose)"	Stonewall Jackson	Columbia
71	13	"I Can't Keep Away from You"	The Wilburn Brothers	Decca
72	13	"Lonelyville"	Dave Dudley	Mercury
73	4	"What We're Fighting For"	Dave Dudley	Mercury
74	17	"Time to Bum Again"	Waylon Jennings	RCA Victor
75		"Anita You're Dreaming"	Waylon Jennings	RCA Victor
76	14	"It's All Over (But the Crying)"	Kitty Wells	Decca
77	3	"England Swings"	Roger Miller	Smash
78	10	"Giddyup Go – Answer"	Minnie Pearl	Starday
79	12	"A Born Loser"	Don Gibson	RCA Victor
80	20	"Rainbows and Roses"	Roy Drusky	Mercury
81	15	"A Woman Half My Age"	Kitty Wells	Decca
82	12	"Viet Nam Blues"	Dave Dudley	Mercury
83	8	"Take Me"	George Jones	Musicor
84	13	"Catch a Little Raindrop"	Claude King	Columbia
85	18	"I've Cried a Mile"	Hank Snow	RCA Victor
86	16	"I'd Just Be Fool Enough"	The Browns	RCA Victor
87	10	"Bad Seed"	Jan Howard	Decca
88		"I Just Came to Smell the Flowers"	Porter Wagoner	RCA Victor
89	15	"Baby Ain't That Fine"	Gene Pitney and Melba Montgomery	Musicor
90	14	"Count Me Out"	Marty Robbins	Columbia
91	9	"Women Do Funny Things to Me"	Del Reeves	United Artists
92		"Touch My Heart"	Ray Price	Columbia
93	11	"Don't You Ever Get Tired (Of Hurting Me)"	Ray Price	Columbia
94	15	"Long Time Gone"	Dave Dudley	Mercury
95	1	"Somebody Like Me"	Eddy Arnold	Capitol
96	14	"Day for Decision"	Johnny Sea	Warner Bros.
97	18	"I'm a Nut"	Leroy Pullins	Kapp
98	17	"The Twelfth of Never"	Slim Whitman	Imperial
99	17	"I Hear Little Rock Calling"	Ferlin Husky	Capitol
100	18	"Guess My Eyes Were Bigger Than My Heart"	Conway Twitty	Decca

== See also ==
- List of Hot Country Singles number ones of 1966
- List of Billboard Hot 100 number ones of 1966
- 1966 in country music
