= 1966 in country music =

This is a list of notable events in country music that took place in 1966.

== Events ==
- March 15 — Roger Miller wins six Grammy Awards, five of them related to his hit "King of the Road". The Statler Brothers take two awards for "Flowers on the Wall".
- April — One of the last broadcasts of The Jimmy Dean Show features the first-ever Academy of Country Music awards. Big winners include Male Vocalist of the Year Buck Owens, Female Vocalist Bonnie Owens, and New Male Vocalist Merle Haggard; Haggard also shared the Vocal Duet/Group award with Bonnie Owens. Taped for later broadcast that year, the ACM Awards would in time become among the most anticipated events of the year by country fans.
- September – Buck Owens' first nationally syndicated program, Buck Owens Ranch Show, debuts in syndication, running primarily in the rural South. The show eventually lasts six years, the final three years overlapping with Owens' stint as co-host of Hee Haw.
- October 15 — Billboard increases the length of its Hot Country Singles chart to 75 positions, up from 50.
- October 22 — At age 48, Eddy Arnold becomes the youngest (to that time) living inductee into the Country Music Hall of Fame.

=== No dates ===
- The single "The Snakes Crawl at Night", by a then-unknown singer named "Country" Charley Pride, is released in the spring but does not chart. After the follow-up single "Before I Met You" also does not chart, a third single, "Just Between You and Me" is released in December and early in 1967 becomes the singer's first major hit, and the first top 10 country hit by an African-American singer in more than 20 years. Pride, who will later drop the "Country" moniker from his name (although disc jockeys will continue using it to this day), goes on to become the most successful black singer in country music history.

== Top hits of the year ==
   Billboard Top Country Singles 1966

1	David Houston	"Almost Persuaded"	Epic 10025	January 1966	June 1966	237	2.00	US Billboard 1966 #216, Hot100 #24 for 1 weeks, 15 total weeks, Top Country Singles 1966 #1, Country Singles #1 for 9 weeks, 25 total weeks, 368 points
2	Jack Greene	"There Goes My Everything"	Decca 32023	August 6, 1966	October 1966	179	1.00	US Billboard 1968 #155, Hot100 #19 for 1 week, 16 total weeks, 4 points, Top Country Singles 1966 #2, Country Singles #1 for 7 weeks, 23 total weeks, 353 points, Grammy Hall of Fame 1999, National Recording Registry 2010
3	Red Sovine	"Giddyup Go"	Starday 737	August 1965	October 1965	187	1.00	US Billboard 1968 #230, Hot100 #32 for 3 weeks, 12 total weeks, Top Country Singles 1966 #4, Country Singles #1 for 6 weeks, 22 total weeks, 349 points, National Recording Registry 2003
4	Buck Owens & The Buckaroos	"Waitin' in Your Welfare Line"	Capitol 5566	August 24, 1965	January 3, 1966	179	1.00	US Billboard 1968 #427, Hot100 #63 for 1 week, 6 total weeks, Top Country Singles 1966 #3, Country Singles #1 for 7 weeks, 19 total weeks, 316 points
5	Buck Owens & The Buckaroos	"Think Of Me"	Capitol 5647	February 15, 1966	May 2, 1966	226	2.00	US Billboard 1966 #229, Hot100 #26 for 1 week, 11 total weeks, Top Country Singles 1966 #5, Country Singles #1 for 6 weeks, 21 total weeks, 313 points, Grammy Hall of Fame 2004

=== Number-one hits ===
==== United States ====
(as certified by Billboard)

Date	Single Name	Artist	Wks. No.1	Spec. Note
January 8	Giddyup Go	Red Sovine	6	Sovine's first Number One hit in ten years since 1955's "Why Baby Why."
February 19	Waitin' in Your Welfare Line/ In the Palm of Your Hand	Buck Owens and the Buckaroos	7
April 9	I Want to Go with You	Eddy Arnold	6
May 21	Distant Drums	Jim Reeves	4
June 18	Take Good Care of Her	Sonny James	2
July 2	Think of Me	Buck Owens and the Buckaroos	6
August 13	Almost Persuaded	David Houston	9	^{[1], [A]}: The longest-running Number One country song by a male artist until Lonestar's single, "Amazed" in 1999.
October 15	Blue Side of Lonesome	Jim Reeves	1
October 22	Open Up Your Heart	Buck Owens and the Buckaroos	4
November 19	I Get the Fever	Bill Anderson	1
November 26	Somebody Like Me	Eddy Arnold	4
December 24	There Goes My Everything	Jack Greene	8	^{[A]}

Notes

- 1 No. 1 song of the year, as determined by Billboard.
- 2 Song dropped from No. 1 and later returned to top spot.
- A First Billboard No. 1 hit for that artist.

==== Canada ====
(as certified by RPM)

Date	Single Name	Artist	Wks. No.1	Spec. Note
January 3	Shadows of Your Heart	Dianne Leigh	2	^{[A]}
January 17	Iron Town	Rhythm Pals	5	^{[A]}
February 21	Don’t Knock on My Door	The Canadian Sweethearts	1	^{[C]}
February 28	This They Say Is Me	Rhythm Pals	2	^{[B]}
March 14	The Auctioneer	Irwin Prescott	1	^{[C]}
December 5	Whistling on the River	Mercey Brothers	7	^{[A], [2]}: Fell to #2 on the week of January 21, 1967.

Notes

- 2 Song dropped from No. 1 and later returned to top spot.
- A First RPM No. 1 hit for that artist.
- B Last RPM No. 1 hit for that artist.
- C Only RPM No. 1 hit for that artist.

=== Other major hits ===
==== Singles released by American artists ====
US	Single	Artist
2	Ain't Had No Lovin'	Connie Smith
6	Almost Persuaded No. 2	Ben Colder
17	Anita, You're Dreaming	Waylon Jennings
16	Another Story	Ernest Tubb
13	At Ease Heart	Ernest Ashworth
7	Baby	Wilma Burgess
15	Baby Ain't That Fine	Gene Pitney and Melba Montgomery
10	Back Pocket Money	Jimmy C. Newman
10	Bad Seed	Jan Howard
2	The Ballad of the Green Berets	Staff Sgt. Barry Sadler
12	Blues Plus Booze (Means I Lose)	Stonewall Jackson
12	A Born Loser	Don Gibson
3	The Bottle Let Me Down	Merle Haggard
18	Bottom of a Mountain	Tex Williams
18	The Box It Came In	Wanda Jackson
13	Catch a Little Raindrop	Claude King
19	Coming Back to You	The Browns
8	The Company You Keep	Bill Phillips
14	Count Me Out	Marty Robbins
14	Day for Decision	Johnny Sea
4	Dear Uncle Sam	Loretta Lynn
2	Don't Touch Me	Jeannie Seely
12	Don't Touch Me	Wilma Burgess
11	Don't You Ever Get Tired (Of Hurting Me)	Ray Price
9	Early Morning Rain	George Hamilton IV
3	England Swings	Roger Miller
17	Everybody Loves a Nut	Johnny Cash
5	Evil on Your Mind	Jan Howard
2	Flowers on the Wall	The Statler Brothers
5	Four-O-Thirty-Three	George Jones
5	The Game of Triangles	Bobby Bare, Norma Jean and Liz Anderson
14	Get Your Lie the Way You Want It	Bonnie Guitar
10	Giddyup Go – Answer	Minnie Pearl
11	Golden Guitar	Bill Anderson
18	Guess My Eyes Were Bigger Than My Heart	Conway Twitty
9	Happy to Be with You	Johnny Cash
2	History Repeats Itself	Buddy Starcher
6	How Long Has It Been	Bobby Lewis
3	The Hurtin's All Over	Connie Smith
5	Husbands and Wives	Roger Miller
13	I Can't Keep Away from You	The Wilburn Brothers
17	I Hear Little Rock Calling	Ferlin Husky
4	I Love You Drops	Bill Anderson
16	I'd Just Be Fool Enough	The Browns
9	I'll Take the Dog	Jean Shepard and Ray Pillow
18	I'm a Nut	Leroy Pullins
6	I’m a People	George Jones
9	I'm Living in Two Worlds	Bonnie Guitar
13	I've Been a Long Time Leavin' (But I'll Be a Long Time Gone)	Roger Miller
10	If Teardrops Were Silver	Jean Shepard
7	If You Can't Bite, Don't Growl	Tommy Collins
4	It Takes a Lot of Money	Warner Mack
14	It's All Over (But the Crying)	Kitty Wells
15	It's Only Love	Jeannie Seely
2	Last Word in Lonesome Is Me	Eddy Arnold
17	Little Buddy	Claude King
13	Lonelyville	Dave Dudley
15	Long Time Gone	Dave Dudley
8	The Lovin' Machine	Johnny Paycheck
13	Many Happy Hangovers to You	Jean Shepard
16	The Men in My Little Girl's Life	Archie Campbell
2	A Million and One	Billy Walker
4	Misty Blue	Wilma Burgess
14	My Dreams	Faron Young
4	Nobody But a Fool (Would Love You)	Connie Smith
19	One in a Row	Willie Nelson
2	The One on the Right Is on the Left	Johnny Cash
6	Put It Off Until Tomorrow	Bill Phillips
20	Rainbows and Roses	Roy Drusky
2	Room in Your Heart	Sonny James
3	The Shoe Goes On the Other Foot Tonight	Marty Robbins
3	Sittin' On a Rock (Crying in a Creek)	Warner Mack
3	Skid Row Joe	Porter Wagoner
2	Snowflake	Jim Reeves
8	Someone Before Me	The Wilburn Brothers
10	Stand Beside Me	Jimmy Dean
5	Standing in the Shadows	Hank Williams, Jr.
17	Stateside	Mel Tillis
15	Steel Rail Blues	George Hamilton IV
15	Stop the Start (Of Tears in My Heart)	Johnny Dollar
5	Streets of Baltimore	Bobby Bare
4	Sweet Thang	Nat Stuckey
5	Swinging Doors	Merle Haggard
8	Take Me	George Jones
3	Talkin' to the Wall	Warner Mack
17	Thank You Ma'am	Ray Pillow
9	(That's What You Get) For Lovin' Me	Waylon Jennings
17	Time to Bum Again	Waylon Jennings
3	The Tip of My Fingers	Eddy Arnold
2	Tippy Toeing	The Harden Trio
3	Touch My Heart	Ray Price
3	True Love's a Blessing	Sonny James
17	The Twelfth of Never	Slim Whitman
7	Unmitigated Gall	Faron Young
12	Viet Nam Blues	Dave Dudley
7	Walking on New Grass	Kenny Price
7	A Way to Survive	Ray Price
4	What Kinda Deal Is This	Bill Carlisle
4	What We're Fighting For	Dave Dudley
15	Where Is the Circus	Hank Thompson
14	Where'd Ya Stay Last Night	Webb Pierce
15	A Woman Half My Age	Kitty Wells
9	Women Do Funny Things to Me	Del Reeves
10	The World Is Round	Roy Drusky
5	Would You Hold It Against Me	Dottie West
16	Write Me a Picture	George Hamilton IV
6	(Yes) I'm Hurting	Don Gibson
2	You Ain't Woman Enough (To Take My Man)	Loretta Lynn
15	You Finally Said Something Good (When You Said Goodbye)	Charlie Louvin

==== Singles released by Canadian artists ====
US	CAN	Single	Artist
—	3	Come Home Newfoundlander	Tom Jim Garth
—	2	Goodbye My Friend	Bob King
—	10	I Don't Never	Odie Workman
18	—	I've Cried a Mile	Hank Snow
—	7	Ice on the Road	Graham Townsend
—	2	Lost Love	Artie MacLaren
—	4	Loving You Again	Johnny Burke
—	6	Muddy Water	Bert Cuff
—	8	Play Me One More Country Song	Ron McMunn
—	4	Rambling Shoes	Bob King
—	3	Three Plays for a Quarter	Ralph Carlson
—	2	Working on the Country Road	Bob King

== Top new album releases ==
Album	Artist	Record Label
Bad Seed	Jan Howard	Decca
The Best of Bobby Bare	Bobby Bare	RCA
Born to Sing	Connie Smith	RCA
Confessions of a Broken Man	Porter Wagoner	RCA
Conway Twitty Sings	Conway Twitty	Decca
Distant Drums	Jim Reeves	RCA
Don't Touch Me	Wilma Burgess	Decca
Folk-Country	Waylon Jennings	RCA
The Girls Get Prettier	Hank Locklin	RCA
I Love You Drops	Bill Anderson	Decca
I Want to Go with You	Eddy Arnold	RCA
I'm a People	George Jones	Musicor
Jan Howard Sings Evil on Your Mind	Jan Howard	Decca
Jimmy Dean's Greatest Hits	Jimmy Dean	Columbia
Look Into My Teardrops	Conway Twitty	Decca
Many Happy Hangovers	Jean Shepard	Capitol
Please Don't Hurt Me	Norma Jean	RCA
The Seely Style	Jeannie Seely	Monument
Somebody Like Me	Eddy Arnold	RCA
The Streets of Baltimore	Bobby Bare	RCA
Suffer Time	Dottie West	RCA
There Goes My Everything	Jack Greene	Decca
Wanda Jackson Salutes the Country Music Hall of Fame	Wanda Jackson	Capitol

== Births ==
- January 4 — Deana Carter, singer-songwriter who enjoyed a string of hits in the mid-to-late 1990s.
- May 13 — Darius Rucker, African-American singer and Hootie & the Blowfish lead vocalist who became a rising country star in the late 2000s (decade).
- July 29 — Martina McBride, crossover-styled female vocalist who rose to fame in the 1990s.
- August 19 — Lee Ann Womack, new traditionalist-styled singer of the 1990s and 2000s (decade) most famous for her crossover hit "I Hope You Dance."
- October 6 - Tim Rushlow, lead singer of Little Texas from 1988 to 1997.
- December 17 — Tracy Byrd, male honky tonk-styled vocalist since the 1990s.

== Deaths ==
- July 1 — Slim Willet, 46, disc jockey and singer-songwriter (heart attack).

== Country Music Hall of Fame Inductees ==
- Eddy Arnold (1918–2008)
- James R. Denny (1911–1963)
- George D. Hay (1895–1968)
- Uncle Dave Macon (1870–1952)

== Major awards ==
=== Grammy Awards ===
- Best Country and Western Vocal Performance, Female — "Don't Touch Me", Jeannie Seely
- Best Country and Western Vocal Performance, Male — "Almost Persuaded", David Houston
- Best Country and Western Recording — "Almost Persuaded", David Houston
- Best Country and Western Song — "Almost Persuaded", Billy Sherrill and Glenn Sutton (Performer: David Houston)

=== Academy of Country Music ===
- Top Male Vocalist — Merle Haggard
- Top Female Vocalist — Bonnie Guitar
- Top New Male Vocalist — Billy Mize
- Top New Female Vocalist — Cathie Taylor

== See also ==
- Country Music Association
- Inductees of the Country Music Hall of Fame
