= List of Hot Country Singles number ones of 1966 =

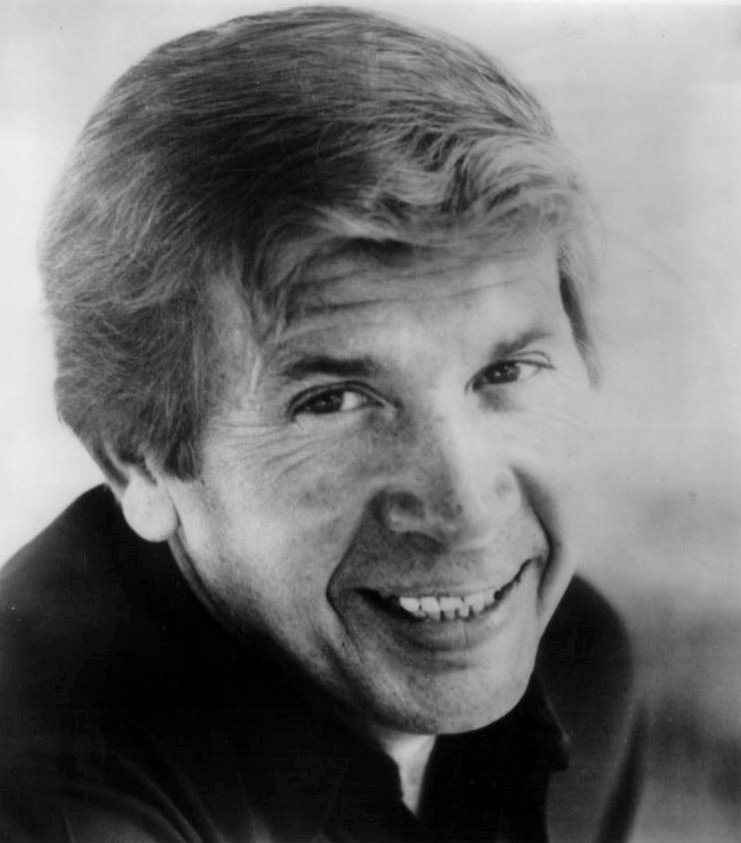
Buck Owens had four number ones in 1966.

Hot Country Songs is a chart that ranks the top-performing country music songs in the United States, published by Billboard magazine. In 1966, 13 different singles topped the chart, which was published at the time under the title Hot Country Singles, in 53 issues of the magazine. Chart placings were based on playlists submitted by country music radio stations and sales reports submitted by stores.

At the start of the year the number one single was the instrumental "Buckaroo" by Buck Owens and his Buckaroos, the track's second week in the top spot. It held the number one position for the first week of 1966 before being replaced by "Giddyup Go" by Red Sovine, the first of a number of sentimental songs about the truck-driving industry for which the singer would become known. After Sovine's six-week run at number one, Owens returned to the top with "Waitin' in Your Welfare Line", the first of three chart-toppers from his album "Open Up Your Heart". One of the most successful recording artists of the mid-1960s, Owens spent the highest number of weeks at number one in 1966, occupying the top spot for a total of 18 weeks with his four chart-topping singles. Only two other artists took more than one single to number one in 1966. Eddy Arnold, one of the biggest country music stars of the 1940s and early 1950s, had revitalized his somewhat declining career in the mid-1960s by embracing the "Nashville sound", a newer style of country music which eschewed elements of the earlier honky-tonk style in favor of smooth productions which had a broader appeal. In 1965, Arnold had gained his first number one in ten years, and his success continued into 1966, when he reached the top spot twice and spent a combined total of ten weeks at number one. Jim Reeves also achieved two chart-toppers in 1966, both of which were posthumous; the singer had been killed in a plane crash two years earlier.

Two vocalists topped the chart in 1966 for the first time in their respective careers. In August, David Houston reached the top spot for the first time with "Almost Persuaded", and remained atop the chart for nine consecutive weeks. There would not be another unbroken run of this length at the top of the Hot Country chart for more than 40 years, until Taylor Swift had a nine-week run at number one with "We Are Never Ever Getting Back Together" in 2012. In December, Jack Greene reached the top of the chart for the first time with "There Goes My Everything", which was the final number one of the year. It would go on to win the award for Song of the Year at the inaugural Country Music Association Awards ceremony early the following year. Both singers would go on to achieve several more number ones in the remainder of the 1960s, but neither would top the chart after 1969.

== Chart history ==
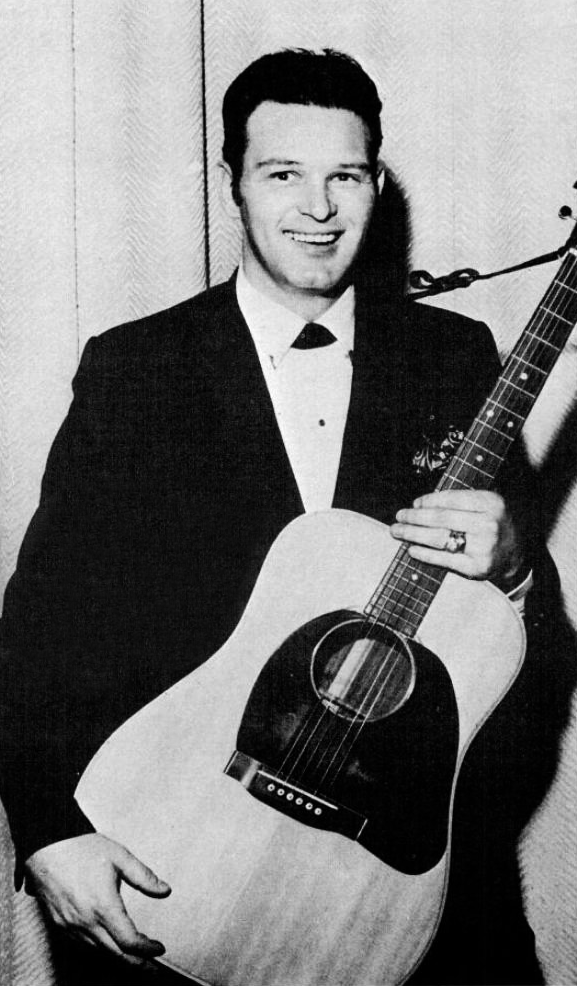
David Houston spent nine consecutive weeks at number one with "Almost Persuaded". The next unbroken run at number one of this length would not occur until 2012.

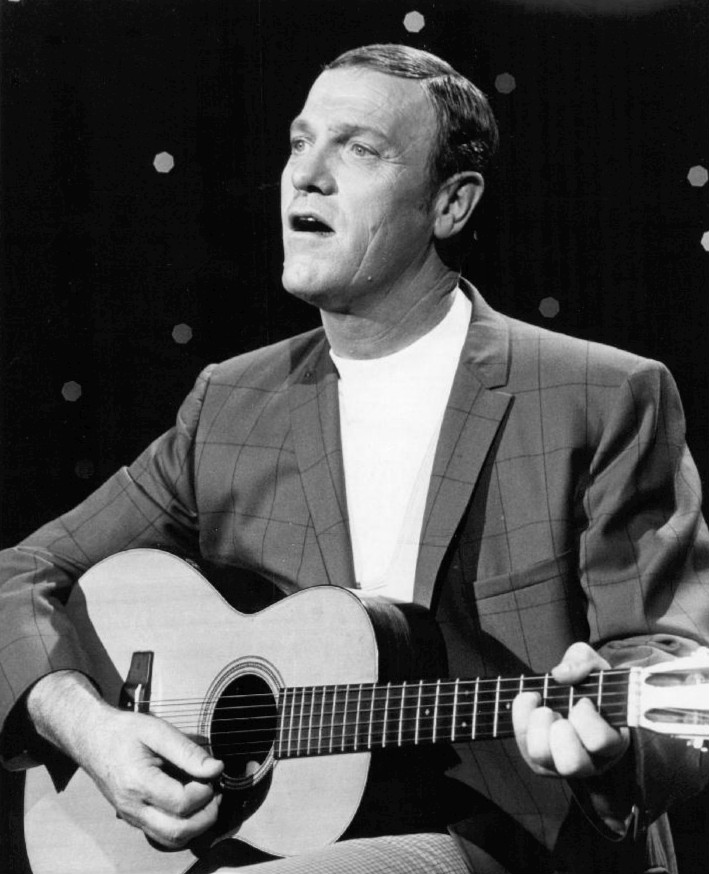
Eddy Arnold had two number ones in 1966, "I Want to Go with You" and "Somebody Like Me".

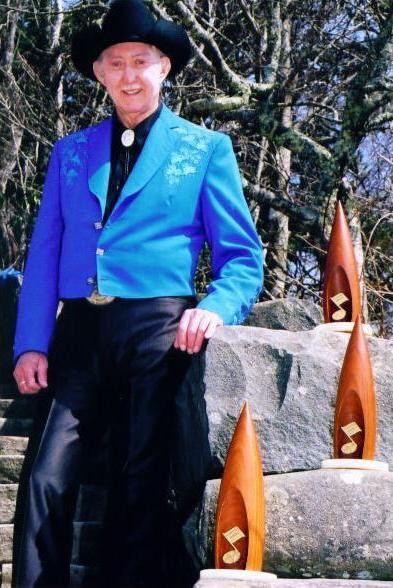
Jack Greene ended the year at number one with "There Goes My Everything".

Hot Country Singles number ones of 1966
Issue date	Title	Artist(s)	Ref.
January 1	"Buckaroo"	Buck Owens and his Buckaroos	
January 8	"Giddyup Go"	Red Sovine	
January 15	"Giddyup Go"	Red Sovine	
January 22	"Giddyup Go"	Red Sovine	
January 29	"Giddyup Go"	Red Sovine	
February 5	"Giddyup Go"	Red Sovine	
February 12	"Giddyup Go"	Red Sovine	
February 19	"Waitin' in Your Welfare Line"	Buck Owens	
February 26	"Waitin' in Your Welfare Line"	Buck Owens	
March 5	"Waitin' in Your Welfare Line"	Buck Owens	
March 12	"Waitin' in Your Welfare Line"	Buck Owens	
March 19	"Waitin' in Your Welfare Line"	Buck Owens	
March 26	"Waitin' in Your Welfare Line"	Buck Owens	
April 2	"Waitin' in Your Welfare Line"	Buck Owens	
April 9	"I Want to Go with You"	Eddy Arnold	
April 16	"I Want to Go with You"	Eddy Arnold	
April 23	"I Want to Go with You"	Eddy Arnold	
April 30	"I Want to Go with You"	Eddy Arnold	
May 7	"I Want to Go with You"	Eddy Arnold	
May 14	"I Want to Go with You"	Eddy Arnold	
May 21	"Distant Drums"	Jim Reeves	
May 28	"Distant Drums"	Jim Reeves	
June 4	"Distant Drums"	Jim Reeves	
June 11	"Distant Drums"	Jim Reeves	
June 18	"Take Good Care of Her"	Sonny James	
June 25	"Take Good Care of Her"	Sonny James	
July 2	"Think Of Me"	Buck Owens	
July 9	"Think Of Me"	Buck Owens	
July 16	"Think Of Me"	Buck Owens	
July 23	"Think Of Me"	Buck Owens	
July 30	"Think Of Me"	Buck Owens	
August 6	"Think Of Me"	Buck Owens	
August 13	"Almost Persuaded"	David Houston	
August 20	"Almost Persuaded"	David Houston	
August 27	"Almost Persuaded"	David Houston	
September 3	"Almost Persuaded"	David Houston	
September 10	"Almost Persuaded"	David Houston	
September 17	"Almost Persuaded"	David Houston	
September 24	"Almost Persuaded"	David Houston	
October 1	"Almost Persuaded"	David Houston	
October 8	"Almost Persuaded"	David Houston	
October 15	"Blue Side of Lonesome"	Jim Reeves	
October 22	"Open Up Your Heart"	Buck Owens	
October 29	"Open Up Your Heart"	Buck Owens	
November 5	"Open Up Your Heart"	Buck Owens	
November 12	"Open Up Your Heart"	Buck Owens	
November 19	"I Get the Fever"	Bill Anderson	
November 26	"Somebody Like Me"	Eddy Arnold	
December 3	"Somebody Like Me"	Eddy Arnold	
December 10	"Somebody Like Me"	Eddy Arnold	
December 17	"Somebody Like Me"	Eddy Arnold	
December 24	"There Goes My Everything"	Jack Greene	
December 31	"There Goes My Everything"	Jack Greene	

== See also ==
- 1966 in music
- 1966 in country music
- List of artists who reached number one on the U.S. country chart
