= List of Hot Country Albums number ones of 1966 =

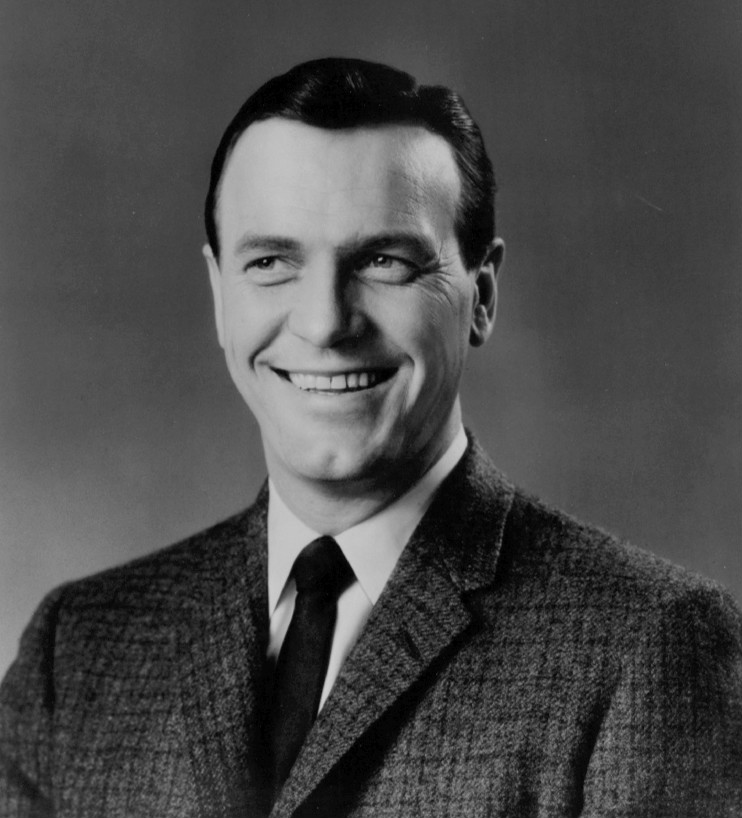
Eddy Arnold had three chart-topping albums in 1966.

Top Country Albums is a chart that ranks the top-performing country music albums in the United States, published by Billboard. In 1966, 17 different albums topped the chart, which was at the time published under the title Hot Country Albums, based on sales reports submitted by a representative sample of stores nationwide.

In the issue of Billboard dated January 1, Connie Smith was at number one with Cute 'n' Country, the album's second week in the top spot. The following week it was displaced from the top spot by My World by Eddy Arnold, which spent eleven consecutive weeks atop the chart, the year's longest unbroken run in the top spot. Arnold would return to number one for two weeks in April with I Want to Go with You and for a single week in September with The Last Word in Lonesome. Buck Owens and his Buckaroos also achieved three chart-toppers during the year, spending a total of 15 weeks in the top spot with Roll Out the Red Carpet for Buck Owens and his Buckaroos, Dust on Mother's Bible and the live recording Carnegie Hall Concert. Between late 1965 and early 1968 Owens and his band placed 12 albums on the chart, only one of which failed to reach number one, however after that the group never topped the chart again. The only artist other than Arnold and Owens to achieve more than one chart-topping album in 1966 was Connie Smith, who returned to the top spot for a single week in December with Born to Sing, which would prove to be her final number-one album.

Four singers who would go on to become amongst the most successful in country music history gained their first number-one albums in the second half of 1966. In August George Jones reached the top spot for the first time with I'm a People, and in November You Ain't Woman Enough was the first chart-topper for Loretta Lynn. In December Merle Haggard, along with his long-time backing band the Strangers, reached the top spot for the first time with Swinging Doors/The Bottle Let Me Down, and Sonny James did the same with the compilation album The Best of Sonny James. Jones, despite many problems in his personal life, accrued more than 150 hit singles and was acclaimed as the greatest vocalist in country music. Haggard achieved nearly 40 number ones on the country singles chart and has been called one of the genre's greatest songwriters. Lynn, who experienced success in six decades and was nominated for a Grammy Award in 2018 at the age of 86, is regarded as one of the most influential female artists in country music and has been dubbed the "first lady of country". James would achieve a string of number ones in the late 1960s and early 1970s and remain successful until he opted to retire from the music industry in 1983. All four have been inducted into the Country Music Hall of Fame in recognition of their contributions to the genre.

== Chart history ==
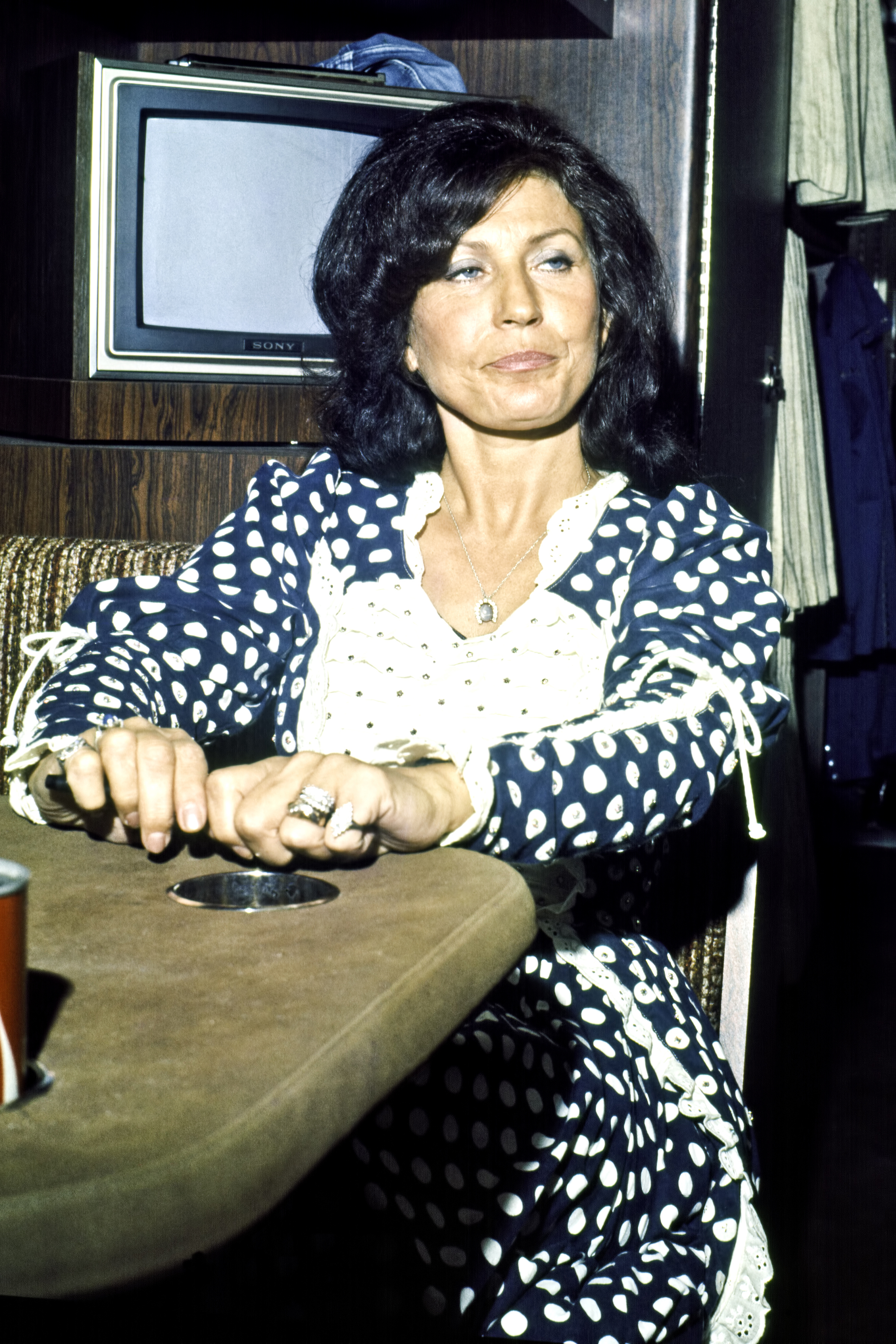
Loretta Lynn had her first number one with You Ain't Woman Enough.

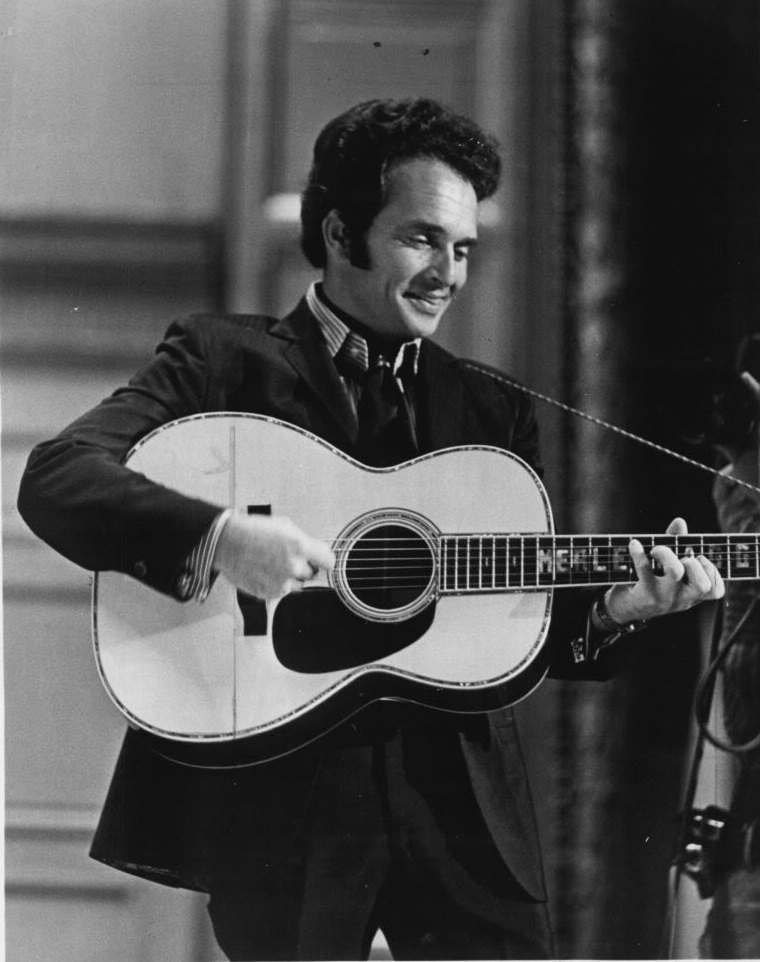
Merle Haggard was another first-time chart-topper in 1966.

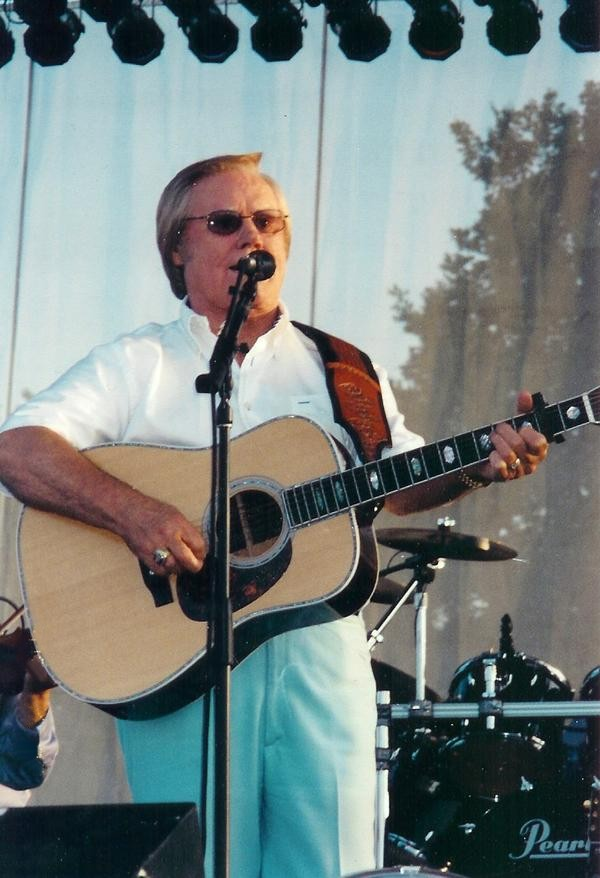
I'm a People was a number-one album for George Jones.

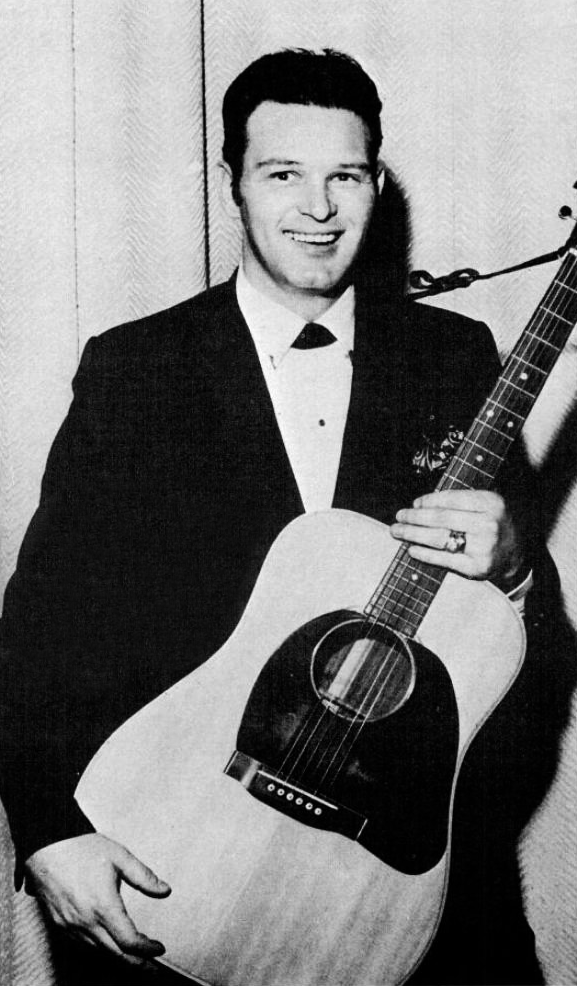
David Houston spent a single week at number one with Almost Persuaded, named for his number-one single of the same title.

| Issue date | Title | Artist(s) | Ref. |
|---|---|---|---|
| January 1 | Cute 'n' Country | Connie Smith | |
| January 8 | My World | Eddy Arnold | |
| January 15 | My World | Eddy Arnold | |
| January 22 | My World | Eddy Arnold | |
| January 29 | My World | Eddy Arnold | |
| February 5 | My World | Eddy Arnold | |
| February 12 | My World | Eddy Arnold | |
| February 19 | My World | Eddy Arnold | |
| February 26 | My World | Eddy Arnold | |
| March 5 | My World | Eddy Arnold | |
| March 12 | My World | Eddy Arnold | |
| March 19 | My World | Eddy Arnold | |
| March 26 | Ballad of the Green Berets | Ssgt Barry Sadler | |
| April 2 | Ballad of the Green Berets | Ssgt Barry Sadler | |
| April 9 | Roll Out the Red Carpet for Buck Owens and his Buckaroos | Buck Owens and his Buckaroos | |
| April 16 | Roll Out the Red Carpet for Buck Owens and his Buckaroos | Buck Owens and his Buckaroos | |
| April 23 | I Want to Go with You | Eddy Arnold | |
| April 30 | I Want to Go with You | Eddy Arnold | |
| May 7 | Roll Out the Red Carpet for Buck Owens and his Buckaroos | Buck Owens and his Buckaroos | |
| May 14 | Roll Out the Red Carpet for Buck Owens and his Buckaroos | Buck Owens and his Buckaroos | |
| May 21 | Roll Out the Red Carpet for Buck Owens and his Buckaroos | Buck Owens and his Buckaroos | |
| May 28 | Roll Out the Red Carpet for Buck Owens and his Buckaroos | Buck Owens and his Buckaroos | |
| June 4 | Roll Out the Red Carpet for Buck Owens and his Buckaroos | Buck Owens and his Buckaroos | |
| June 11 | Roll Out the Red Carpet for Buck Owens and his Buckaroos | Buck Owens and his Buckaroos | |
| June 18 | Distant Drums | Jim Reeves | |
| June 25 | Distant Drums | Jim Reeves | |
| July 2 | Distant Drums | Jim Reeves | |
| July 9 | Distant Drums | Jim Reeves | |
| July 16 | Distant Drums | Jim Reeves | |
| July 23 | Distant Drums | Jim Reeves | |
| July 30 | Distant Drums | Jim Reeves | |
| August 6 | I'm a People | George Jones | |
| August 13 | I'm a People | George Jones | |
| August 20 | Dust on Mother's Bible | Buck Owens and his Buckaroos | |
| August 27 | Dust on Mother's Bible | Buck Owens and his Buckaroos | |
| September 3 | The Last Word in Lonesome | Eddy Arnold | |
| September 10 | Carnegie Hall Concert | Buck Owens and his Buckaroos | |
| September 17 | Carnegie Hall Concert | Buck Owens and his Buckaroos | |
| September 24 | Carnegie Hall Concert | Buck Owens and his Buckaroos | |
| October 1 | Carnegie Hall Concert | Buck Owens and his Buckaroos | |
| October 8 | Almost Persuaded | David Houston | |
| October 15 | I Love You Drops | Bill Anderson | |
| October 22 | I Love You Drops | Bill Anderson | |
| October 29 | Carnegie Hall Concert | Buck Owens and his Buckaroos | |
| November 5 | Another Bridge to Burn | Ray Price | |
| November 12 | You Ain't Woman Enough | Loretta Lynn | |
| November 19 | You Ain't Woman Enough | Loretta Lynn | |
| November 26 | Another Bridge to Burn | Ray Price | |
| December 3 | Born to Sing | Connie Smith | |
| December 10 | Swinging Doors/The Bottle Let Me Down | Merle Haggard and the Strangers | |
| December 17 | Swinging Doors/The Bottle Let Me Down | Merle Haggard and the Strangers | |
| December 24 | The Best of Sonny James | Sonny James | |
| December 31 | The Best of Sonny James | Sonny James | |
