= Twenty-one Number One Hits: The Ultimate Collection =

21 #1 Hits: The Ultimate Collection

Greatest hits album by Buck Owens
- Released: August 1, 2006
- Recorded: Feb 12, 1963–Apr 4, 1988
- Genre: Country
- Length: 49:57
- Label: Rhino
- Producer: Ken Nelson, Pete Anderson

Buck Owens chronology
Remembering (2006)	21 #1 Hits: The Ultimate Collection (2006)	Down on the Corner of Love (2006)

21 #1 Hits: The Ultimate Collection is an album by Buck Owens and his Buckaroos, released in 2006. Released shortly after his death, it is a single-disc compilation containing all of Owens' number one chart hits.

== Reception ==
Professional ratings
Review scores
Source	Rating
Allmusic	5/5 stars

In his Allmusic review, critic Stephen Thomas Erlewine wrote "...there is no other single-disc Buck CD that comes as close to offering as much of his best in one disc as 21 #1 Hits: The Ultimate Collection, and it's nice to finally have such a collection in his catalog after such a long wait."

== Track listing ==
All songs by Buck Owens unless otherwise noted.

1. "Act Naturally" (Voni Morrison, Johnny Russell) – 2:22
2. "Love's Gonna Live Here" – 2:02
3. "Streets of Bakersfield" [Dwight Yoakam & Buck Owens] (Homer Joy) – 2:49
4. "I've Got a Tiger By the Tail" (Harlan Howard, Owens) – 2:15
5. "My Heart Skips a Beat" – 2:27
6. "Together Again" – 2:27
7. "I Don't Care (Just as Long as You Love Me)" – 2:10
8. "Before You Go" (Owens, Don Rich) – 2:11
9. "Only You (Can Break My Heart)" – 2:21
10. "Buckaroo" (Bob Morris) – 2:00
11. "Waitin' in Your Welfare Line" (Owens, Rich, Nat Stuckey) – 2:19
12. "Think of Me" (Estella Olson, Rich) – 2:17
13. "Open Up Your Heart" – 2:29
14. "Where Does the Good Times Go" – 2:20
15. "Sam's Place" (Owens, Red Simpson) – 2:00
16. "Your Tender Loving Care" – 2:46
17. "How Long Will My Baby Be Gone" – 2:14
18. "Who's Gonna Mow Your Grass" – 2:23
19. "Tall Dark Stranger" – 3:00
20. "Made in Japan" (Bob Morris, Faye Morris) – 2:42
21. "Johnny B. Goode" (Chuck Berry) – 2:23

== Personnel ==
- Buck Owens – guitar, vocals, harmony vocals
- Don Rich – guitar, fiddle, harmony vocals
- Doyle Holly – guitar, bass, background vocals
- Flaco Jiménez – accordion
- The Jordanaires – background vocals
- Pete Anderson – guitar
- Albert "Al Bruno" Bruneau – guitar
- James Burton – guitar
- Willie Cantu – drums, tambourine
- Mel King – drums
- Doyle Curtsinger – bass
- Jeff Donavan – drums
- Skip Edwards – piano
- Donald Frost – bass
- Tom Brumley – pedal steel guitar
- Jay Dee Maness – pedal steel guitar
- Jay McDonald – pedal steel guitar
- Bob Morris – bass
- Kenny Pierce – bass
- Ken Presley – drums
- Taras Prodaniuk – bass
- Don Reed – fiddle
- Jelly Sanders – guitar
- Jim Shaw – organ
- Red Simpson – guitar
- Mel Taylor – drums
- Jerry Wiggins – drums
- Dwight Yoakam – guitar, vocals

Production notes

- Ken Nelson – producer
- Pete Anderson – producer
- Jim Shaw – executive producer
- James Austin – project Supervisor
- Dave Schultz – remastering
- Mathieu Bitton – art direction, design
- Patrick Mulligan – discographical annotation
- Gary Peterson – discographical annotation
- Rich Kienzle – liner notes
- Sheryl Farber – editorial supervision
- Alan Fletcher – project supervisor
- Mimi Miraflor – project assistant
- Steve Woolard – project assistant
- Becky Wagner – project assistant

== Charts ==
Chart performance for Twenty-one Number One Hits: The Ultimate Collection
Chart (2006)	Peak position
Norwegian Albums (VG-lista)	6
US Top Country Albums (Billboard)	55
