= Carnegie Hall Concert (Buck Owens album) =

Live album by Buck Owens and his Buckaroos
- Released: July 25, 1966
- Recorded: March 25, 1966
- Venues: Carnegie Hall, New York, NY
- Genre: Country
- Length: 25:01 LP/49:08 CD
- Label: Capitol
- Producer: Ken Nelson

Buck Owens and his Buckaroos chronology
Dust on Mother's Bible (1966)	Carnegie Hall Concert (1966)	Open Up Your Heart (1966)

Carnegie Hall Concert is a 1966 album by the country band Buck Owens and his Buckaroos. The album was recorded live at Carnegie Hall, as Buck Owens and his Buckaroos became the second country band ever to perform there.

It was re-issued on CD in 2000 by Sundazed Music. In 2013, Carnegie Hall Concert was selected by the Library of Congress for inclusion in the National Recording Registry for being "culturally, historically or aesthetically important."

== Reception ==
Professional ratings
Review scores
Source	Rating
Allmusic	5/5 stars

In his AllMusic review, critic Stephen Thomas Erlewine wrote "Owens and the Buckaroos had to deliver a stellar performance, and they did—the group sounded like dynamite, tearing through a selection of their classic hits with vigor. Several decades removed from the performance itself, what really comes through is how musical and gifted the Buckaroos were, particularly Don Rich. For dedicated fans, it's a necessary addition to their collection."

== Track listing ==
1. "Introduction by DJ Lee Arnold"
2. "Act Naturally" (Johnny Russell, Voni Morrison)
3. "Together Again" (Buck Owens)
4. "Love's Gonna Live Here" (Owens)
5. Medley:
  1. "In the Palm of Your Hand" (Owens)
  2. "Cryin' Time" (Owens)
  3. "Don't Let Her Know" (Owens, Bonnie Owens, Don Rich)
  4. "Only You (Can Break My Heart)" (Owens)
6. Medley:
  1. "I Don't Care (Just as Long as You Love Me)" (Owens)
  2. "My Heart Skips a Beat" (Owens)
  3. "Gonna Have Love" (Owens, Red Simpson)
7. "Buck Talks to the Audience"
8. "Waitin' in Your Welfare Line" (Owens, Rich, Nat Stuckey)
9. "Buck Introduces the Band"
10. "Buckaroo" (Bob Morris)
11. "The Streets of Laredo" (Solo by Doyle Holly)
12. "I've Got a Tiger By the Tail" (Harlan Howard, Owens)
13. "Fun 'N' Games with Don and Doyle"
14. "Twist and Shout" (Phil Medley, Bert Russell)
15. Medley:
  1. "Under Your Spell Again" (Owens, Dusty Rhodes)
  2. "Above and Beyond" (Howard)
  3. "Excuse Me (I Think I've Got a Heartache)" (Owens)
  4. "Foolin' Around" (Howard, Owens)
  5. "Hello Trouble" (Orville Couch, Eddie McDuff)
  6. "Truck Drivin' Man" (Terry Fell)
16. "Buck's Closing Remarks"

== Personnel ==
- Buck Owens – vocals, guitar
- Don Rich – guitar, vocals
- Doyle Holly – bass, vocals, (Lead vocal on "The Streets of Laredo.")
- Tom Brumley – pedal steel guitar
- Willie Cantu – drums

== Charts ==
Chart performance for Carnegie Hall Concert
Chart (1966)	Peak position
Norwegian Albums (VG-lista)	13
US Billboard 200	114
US Top Country Albums (Billboard)	1
