= Open Up Your Heart =

Open Up Your Heart may refer to:

- "Open Up Your Heart (And Let the Sunshine In)", a popular song written by Stuart Hamblen, published in 1954
- Open Up Your Heart (album), a 1966 album by Buck Owens
  - "Open Up Your Heart" (song), title track to the album
- "Open Up Your Heart", a song by The Rapture from their 2003 album Echoes
