= Christmas with Buck Owens and his Buckaroos =

Studio album by Buck Owens
- Released: October 4, 1965
- Recorded: May 1965
- Studio: Capitol (Hollywood)
- Genres: Country, Christmas
- Length: 25:58
- Label: Capitol ST-2396
- Producer: Ken Nelson

Buck Owens chronology
| Before You Go (1965) | Christmas with Buck Owens and his Buckaroos (1965) | Roll Out the Red Carpet (1966) |

Christmas with Buck Owens and his Buckaroos is the fifth studio album, first Christmas album, and Owens tenth overall album by Buck Owens and his Buckaroos, released in 1965. The album charted for 10 weeks peaking at #12 on Billboard's Best Bets For Christmas December 25, 1965. It was re-issued on CD by Sundazed Music in 1999, and again via digital download in 2011.

== Reception ==
Professional ratings
Review scores
| Source | Rating |
|---|---|
| AllMusic | 4.5/5 stars |

In his AllMusic review, critic Cub Koda wrote of the CD reissue, "this is prime Buck Owens and His Buckaroos in the holiday mode. Featured here are 'Santa Looked a Lot Like Daddy,' 'Santa's Gonna Come in a Stagecoach,' and enough Yule-time weepers to make you realize that the holidays have a mighty dark side, too."

== Track listing ==
=== Side one ===
1. "Santa Looked a Lot Like Daddy" (Buck Owens, Don Rich) – 2:15
2. "Blue Christmas Lights" (Owens, Red Simpson) – 2:42
3. "Christmas Ain't Christmas Dear Without You" (Owens, Simpson) – 2:21
4. "Jingle Bells" (James Pierpont) – 2:17 (instrumental)
5. "All I Want for Christmas, Dear, Is You" (Owens, Rich) – 2:14
6. "Santa's Gonna Come in a Stagecoach" (Rich, Simpson) – 2:02

=== Side two ===
1. "Christmas Time's a Comin'" (Owens, Simpson) – 1:53
2. "Blue Christmas Tree" (Eddie Miller, Bob Morris) – 2:30
3. "Here Comes Santa Claus Again" (Owens, Simpson) – 2:08
4. "Christmas Morning" (Owens, Rich) – 1:40 (instrumental)
5. "It's Christmas Time for Everyone But Me" (Dixie Dean, Ray King) – 2:15
6. "Because It's Christmas Time" (Owens, Simpson) – 2:11
