= From This Pen =

Compilation album by Bill Anderson
- Released: June 1965
- Recorded: 1958–1965
- Studio: Bradley Studios (Nashville, Tennessee); Columbia (Nashville, Tennessee)
- Genre: Country; Nashville Sound
- Length: 33:20
- Label: Decca
- Producer: Owen Bradley

Bill Anderson chronology
Showcase (1964)	From This Pen (1965)	Bright Lights and Country Music (1965)

From This Pen is a compilation album by American country music singer-songwriter Bill Anderson. It was released in June 1965 via Decca Records in several sessions produced by Owen Bradley. It was Anderson's second compilation released during his career and contained songs that he had recorded since his signing with the label. Many of the songs featured were major hits for Anderson in preceding years.

== Background, release and reception ==
Professional ratings
Review scores
Source	Rating
Record Mirror	3/5 stars

From This Pen was Anderson's first compilation (and album overall) to feature entirely self-composed material. The album's title was derived from this idea. Although many of these songs were recorded by other artists, Anderson also cut them. This occurred in a series of sessions that took place in his early years at Decca (between 1958 and 1965). All of the sessions were produced by Anderson's long-time studio producer, Owen Bradley. The recording sessions were held at the Bradley Studios in Nashville, Tennessee, which changed ownership and were renamed Columbia Studios over the course of the recording of the songs included on the album. The album contained a total of 13 tracks. This included the lead track, which served as a spoken introduction to the album. Only two tracks were co-written with other songwriters. The remaining tracks were entirely self-composed. Several of these compositions were pitched to other country artists and became major hits during this time. These former hits include Connie Smith's "Once a Day," Lefty Frizzell's "Saginaw, Michigan," Ray Price's "City Lights" and Charlie Louvin's "I Don't Love You Anymore."

From This Pen was released in June 1965 on the Decca label. It was Anderson's second compilation released in his music career. The record was issued as a vinyl LP, containing seven track on side one and six tracks on side two. From This Pen spent 14 weeks on the Billboard Top Country Albums chart and peaked at number seven in October 1965. It became Anderson's third album to chart on the Billboard country albums survey. From This Pen received positive reception from Allmusic, who rated the record three out of five stars.

== Track listing ==
All songs composed by Bill Anderson, except where noted.

Side one
No.	Title	Writer(s)	Length
1.	"Introduction"		1:00
2.	"Saginaw, Michigan"	Anderson; Don Wayne	3:12
3.	"City Lights"		3:00
4.	"Once a Day"		2:35
5.	"I Missed Me"		2:45
6.	"Mama Sang a Song"		3:27
7.	"That's What It's Like to Be Lonesome"		2:30

Side two
No.	Title	Writer(s)	Length
1.	"Riverboat"		2:24
2.	"The Tip of My Fingers"		2:29
3.	"I've Enjoyed as Much of This as I Can Stand"	Anderson; Jeannie Seely	2:32
4.	"Po' Folks"		2:50
5.	"I Don't Love You Anymore"		2:28
6.	"Still"		2:45

== Personnel ==
All credits are adapted from the liner notes of From This Pen.

Musical personnel

- Bill Anderson – lead vocals
- Harold Bradley – banjo, guitar
- Floyd Cramer – piano, vibes
- Jimmy Day – steel guitar
- Pete Drake – steel guitar
- Buddy Emmons – steel guitar
- Buddy Harman – drums
- Tommy Jackson – fiddle
- Bob Moore – bass
- Morris Palmer – drums
- Jimmy Riddle – harmonica
- The Anita Kerr Singers – background vocals
- Joe Zinkan – bass

Technical personnel

- Owen Bradley – producer

== Chart performance ==
Chart (1965)	Peak position
US Top Country Albums (Billboard)	7

== Release history ==
Region	Date	Format	Label	Ref.
Canada	June 1965	Vinyl	Decca	
United States	June 1965	Vinyl	Decca	
