= Get While the Gettin's Good =

Studio album by Bill Anderson
- Released: February 1967
- Recorded: November 1966
- Studios: Bradley's Barn, Mount Juliet, Tennessee
- Genres: Country; Nashville Sound
- Label: Decca
- Producer: Owen Bradley

Bill Anderson chronology
I Love You Drops (1966)	Get While the Gettin's Good (1967)	I Can Do Nothing Alone (1967)

Singles from Get While the Gettin's Good
- 1. "Get While the Gettin's Good" Released: January 1967

Get While the Gettin's Good is a studio album by American country singer-songwriter Bill Anderson. It was released in February 1967 on Decca Records and was produced by Owen Bradley. The project was Anderson's sixth studio album and included one single issued. The album itself reached peak positions on the Billboard country albums chart.

== Background and content ==
Get While the Gettin's Good was recorded in November 1966 at Bradley's Barn, a studio located in Mount Juliet, Tennessee and owned by the album's producer, Owen Bradley. Anderson had been recording with Bradley since his beginnings at the Decca label in the late 1950s. This would be their sixth studio album together. The album consisted of 12 tracks that were previously unrecorded. Five of the album's tunes were composed by Anderson, including the title track. Among these songs was "Bad Seed", which had recently become a major country hit for Jan Howard. Other songs were cover versions of songs previously recorded by others. The third track, "A Satisfied Mind", had been previously recorded by Porter Wagoner and Jean Shepard respectively. "Ride, Ride, Ride" was first cut by Lynn Anderson. A third track, "Open Up Your Heart", had first been recorded by Buck Owens.

== Release and reception ==
Professional ratings
Review scores
Source	Rating
Allmusic	3/5 stars

Get While the Gettin's Good was released in February 1967 on Decca Records. The album was released as a vinyl record, with six songs on both sides of the project. The record peaked at number eight on the Billboard Top Country Albums chart on April 15, 1967, becoming Anderson's fifth studio album to reach the top ten on that chart.

The album included one single which was the title track. The title track was released a month prior to the album, January 1967. By March 1967, the single had peaked at number five on the Billboard Hot Country Singles chart, becoming Anderson's twelfth top ten hit on that chart. Following its release, the album would be reviewed by Allmusic. They gave the project three out of five possible stars.

== Track listing ==
Side one
No.	Title	Writer(s)	Length
1.	"Get While the Gettin's Good"	Bill Anderson	2:32
2.	"The Wheel of Hurt"	Charles Singleton; Eddie Snyder	2:32
3.	"A Satisfied Mind"	Red Hayes; Jack Rhodes	2:27
4.	"The First Mrs. Jones"	Anderson	2:43
5.	"Bad Seed"	Anderson	2:58
6.	"Something to Believe In"	Anderson	2:57

Side two
No.	Title	Writer(s)	Length
1.	"Ride, Ride, Ride"	Liz Anderson	2:04
2.	"Daddy and My Mama and Me"	Jimmy Gateley	2:30
3.	"Open Up Your Heart"	Buck Owens	2:21
4.	"Homesick"	Billy Cole	2:30
5.	"Born"	Anderson	2:30
6.	"Remember Me (When the Candlelights Are Gleaming)"	Scotty Wiseman	2:29

== Personnel ==
All credits are adapted from the liner notes of I Love You Drops.

Musical personnel

- Bill Anderson – lead vocals
- Harold Bradley – guitar
- Ray Edenton – guitar
- Roy Huskey – bass
- The Jordanaires – background vocals
- Jimmy Lance – guitar
- Grady Martin – guitar
- Len Miller – drums
- Hargus "Pig" Robbins – piano
- Hal Rugg – steel guitar
- Jerry Shook – guitar
- Jerry Smith – piano

Technical personnel

- Owen Bradley – record producer
- Hal Buksbaum – photography

== Chart performance ==
Chart (1967)	Peak position
US Top Country Albums (Billboard)	8

== Release history ==
Region	Date	Format	Label	Ref.
United States	February 1967	Vinyl	Decca	
