= Certain (song) =

Single by Bill Anderson

from the album I Love You Drops
- B-side: "You Can Have Her"
- Released: February 1965
- Recorded: December 30, 1964
- Studio: Bradley Studio
- Genre: Country; Nashville Sound
- Length: 2:36
- Label: Decca
- Songwriter: Bill Anderson
- Producer: Owen Bradley

Bill Anderson singles chronology
"Three A.M." (1964)	"Certain" (1965)	"Bright Lights and Country Music" (1965)

"Certain" is a song written and first recorded by American country singer-songwriter Bill Anderson. It was released as a single in 1965 via Decca Records and became a major hit.

== Background and release ==
"Certain" was recorded on December 30, 1964, at the Bradley Studio, located in Nashville, Tennessee. The sessions were produced by Owen Bradley, who would serve as Anderson's producer through most of years with Decca Records. Two additional tracks were recorded at the session as well.

"Certain" was released as a single by Decca Records in February 1965. The song spent 17 weeks on the Billboard Hot Country Singles before reaching number 12 in May 1965. It was later released on his 1966 studio album I Love You Drops.

== Track listings ==
7" vinyl single

- "Certain" – 2:36
- "You Can Have Her" – 2:32

== Chart performance ==
Chart (1965)	Peak position
US Hot Country Songs (Billboard)	12
