= Bright Lights and Country Music =

Studio album by Bill Anderson and the Po' Boys
- Released: November 1965
- Recorded: July 1965
- Studios: Columbia (Nashville, Tennessee)
- Genres: Country; Nashville Sound
- Label: Decca
- Producer: Owen Bradley

Bill Anderson and the Po' Boys chronology
From This Pen (1965)	Bright Lights and Country Music (1965)	I Love You Drops (1966)

Singles from Bright Lights and Country Music
- 1. "Bright Lights and Country Music/Golden Guitar" Released: August 1965

Bright Lights and Country Music is a studio album by Bill Anderson and the Po' Boys. It was released in November 1965 on Decca Records and was produced by Owen Bradley. It was Anderson's first studio album to include dual credit with his band, The Po' Boys. It was his fourth studio album overall. The album included one single release, the title track. This song became a major hit on the Billboard country charts. The album itself also reached charting positions on Billboard shortly after its release.

== Background and content ==
Bright Lights and Country Music was recorded in July 1965 at the Columbia Recording Studios. The sessions were produced by Owen Bradley, whom Anderson had been collaborating with for several years. It was Anderson's first studio album that included lead credit with his band, The Po' Boys. The album consisted of 12 tracks. Like his previous studio releases, the album contained several songs written by Anderson. Among these songs was the title track, which appeared as the first song in the set. Other songs were new recordings and cover versions songs recorded by others. Among the record's covers was "The Wild Side of Life", which was first released by Hank Thompson in the 1950s. Another cover was the fifth track, "How the Other Half Lives". This song was first recorded by Wynn Stewart and Jan Howard as a duet.

== Release and reception ==
Bright Lights and Country Music was released in November 1965 on Decca Records. The album was released as a vinyl record, with six songs on side of the recording. The album peaked at number 6 on the Billboard Top Country Albums chart on February 12, 1966. It became Anderson's fifth album release to reach a position on this chart. The title track was the only single released from the album. It was issued in August 1965 and became a major hit, peaking at number 11 on the Billboard Hot Country Singles chart in November 1965. The song "Golden Guitar" would later be included as a B-side to a single not included on this album. The album was later reviewed by Allmusic, which gave the release a rating of 4.5 out of 5 possible stars.

== Track listing ==
Side one
No.	Title	Writer(s)	Length
1.	"Bright Lights and Country Music"	Bill Anderson; Jimmy Gateley	2:35
2.	"Wild Side of Life"	Arlie Carter; William Warren	2:46
3.	"Golden Guitar"	Billy Gray; Curtis Leach	4:13
4.	"Wine"	Mel Tillis	3:04
5.	"How the Other Half Lives"	Fuzzy Owen; Wynn Stewart	2:09
6.	"Good Old Mountain Dew"	Bascom Lamar Lunsford; Scotty Wiseman	2:56

Side two
No.	Title	Writer(s)	Length
1.	"Truck Drivin' Man"	Terry Fell	2:17
2.	"I'll Go Down Swinging"	Anderson	2:48
3.	"The Strangers' Story"	Pete Stamper	3:04
4.	"Sittin' in an All-Nite Cafe"	Jim Glaser	2:30
5.	"Cocktails"	Anderson	2:29
6.	"I'm Walking the Dog"	Cliff Grimsley; Tex Grimsley	2:02

== Personnel ==
All credits are adapted from the liner notes of Bright Lights and Country Music.

Musical personnel

- Bill Anderson – lead vocals
- Harold Bradley – guitar, banjo
- James Colvard – guitar
- Floyd Cramer – piano
- Pete Drake – steel guitar
- Ray Edenton – guitar
- Jimmy Gateley – guitar
- Roy Huskey – bass
- The Jordanaires – background vocals
- Jimmy Lance – guitar
- Grady Martin – guitar
- Len Miller – drums
- Bob Moore – bass
- Weldon Myrick – steel guitar
- The Po' Boys – various
- Joe Zinkan – bass

Technical personnel

- Owen Bradley – producer
- Hal Buksbaum – photography

== Chart performance ==
Chart (1965)	Peak position
US Top Country Albums (Billboard)	6

== Release history ==
Region	Date	Format	Label	Ref.
United States	February 1964	Vinyl	Decca	
