= Arlene Harden =

American country music singer (born 1945)

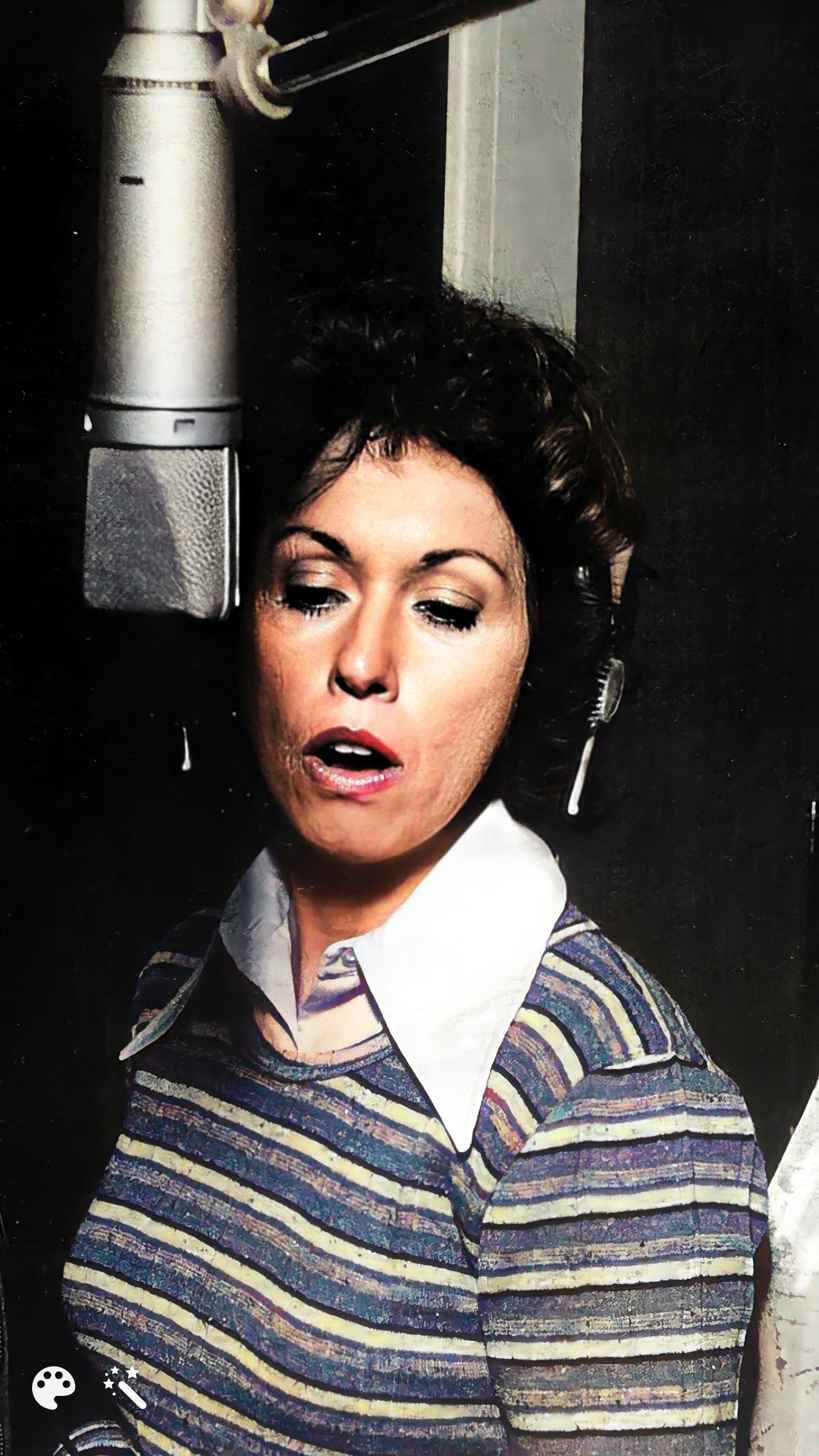

Background information
- Born: March 1, 1945 (age 80)
- Origin: England, Arkansas, U.S.
- Genres: Country
- Years active: 1966–1978
- Labels: Columbia; Capitol; Elektra
- Formerly of: The Harden Trio

Ava "Arlene" Harden (born March 1, 1945) is an American country music singer. Between 1966 and 1968, she was one-third of The Harden Trio, which comprised her brother, Bobby and sister, Robbie. Arlene recorded for Columbia Records as a solo artist between 1967 and 1973, charting fifteen times on the Hot Country Songs charts. Her most successful release was a cover of Roy Orbison's "Oh, Pretty Woman", titled "Lovin' Man (Oh Pretty Woman)". She later recorded for Capitol and Elektra as Arleen Harden.

== Discography ==
=== Albums ===
Title	Album details
What Can I Say	Release date: August 1968; Label: Columbia Records
Arlene Harden Sings Roy Orbison	Release date: March 1970; Label: Columbia Records
I Could Almost Say Goodbye	Release date: June 1975; Label: Capitol Records

=== Singles ===
Year	Single	Peak positions		Album
Year	Single	US Country	CAN Country	Album
1967	"You and Only You"	—	—	—
1967	"Fair Weather Love"	48	—	What Can I Say
1967	"You're Easy to Love"	49	—	—
1968	"He's a Good Ole Boy"	32	—	What Can I Say
1968	"What Can I Say"	41	—	What Can I Say
1969	"Too Much of a Man (To Be Tied Down)"	45	—	—
1969	"My Friend"	63	—	Arlene Harden Sings Roy Orbison
1970	"Lovin' Man (Oh Pretty Woman)"	13	24	Arlene Harden Sings Roy Orbison
1970	"Crying"	28	—	Arlene Harden Sings Roy Orbison
1971	"True Love Is Greater Than Friendship"	22	—	—
1971	"Married to a Memory"	25	—	—
1971	"Congratulations (You Sure Made a Man out of Him)"	49	—	—
1971	"Ruby Gentry's Daughter"	46	—	—
1972	"A Special Day"	29	—	—
1972	"It Takes a Lot of Tenderness"	45	—	—
1973	"Would You Walk with Me Jimmy"	21	—	—
1974	"Leave Me Alone (Ruby Red Dress)"	72	—	I Could Almost Say Goodbye
1975	"I Could Almost Say Goodbye"	—	—	I Could Almost Say Goodbye
1975	"Country Sunday"	—	—	I Could Almost Say Goodbye
1975	"Roll On, Sweet Mississippi"	—	—	I Could Almost Say Goodbye
1976	"Misty Mountain Rain"	—	—	—
1977	"Southern Belle"	—	—	—
1977	"A Place Where Love Has Been"	100	—	—
1978	"You're Not Free and I'm Not Easy"	74	—	—
"—" denotes releases that did not chart
