= I'm a Truck =

Single by Red Simpson

from the album I'm a Truck
- Released: November 1971
- Recorded: 1971
- Genre: Country, truck-driving country
- Length: 3:12
- Label: Capitol
- Songwriter(s): Robert Stanton
- Producer(s): Gene Breeden

Red Simpson singles chronology
"He Reminds Me a Whole Lot of Me" (1971)	"I'm a Truck" (1971)	"Country Western Truck Drivin' Singer" (1973)

"I'm a Truck" is a song recorded by American country music singer Red Simpson. It was released in November 1971 as the first single and title track from the album I'm a Truck. The song — sometimes known as "Hello, I'm a Truck" — became Simpson's biggest hit single, reaching No. 4 on the Billboard Hot Country Singles chart in January 1972, and spending 17 weeks on this chart.

== About the song ==
Producer Gene Breeden had been looking for artists for his label, Portland Limited, when he received a song called "I'm a Truck" from songwriter Robert Stanton. Breeden and Simpson met in Vancouver, Washington, in 1971, where Simpson agreed to record the song. That fall, it was picked up for national distribution by Capitol Records.

=== A truck's story never told ===
Although the song is about truck driving, "I'm a Truck" is specifically about life on the road through the eyes of a truck. Instead of giving praise to the hard work of the truck driver (as most truck-driving songs had), the truck — whose story is told in first-person narrative — takes a cynical look at the profession. For instance, he (the truck) paints the man who drives him as an arrogant braggart, citing as an example the truck driver's story to others of how he topped a long, steep hill with ease but, as the truck points out, conveniently forgets other situations such as missing a gear and causing the truck's engine to stall or nearly driving off the road when he misses a curve. In the former instance, a "Volkswagen bus full of hippies passed us like I was sitting up on jacks"; in the latter case, if it hadn't been for the truck's efforts to stay on the road, "we'd have both wound up in the ditch."

After bemoaning his thankless situation of never getting credit for the truck driver's job well done, he continues to muse about his life: The trucker flirts with waitresses but never tips them; he winds up parked next to a smelly cattle truck (instead of a pink Mack with "pretty mudflaps" and chromed stacks); the trucker beats on the tires with an iron (the truck wishes aloud he'd have "a flat on the inside dual" to teach the driver a lesson); and the trucker will probably "take out that tape cartridge of Buck Owens and play him again" (instead of the artist that the truck apparently really enjoys, Merle Haggard).

== Charts ==
=== Weekly charts ===
Chart (1972)	Peak position
US Hot Country Songs (Billboard)	4
Canadian RPM Country Tracks	4

=== Year-end charts ===
Chart (1972)	Position
US Hot Country Songs (Billboard)	31
