= Get While the Gettin's Good (song) =

Single by Bill Anderson

from the album Get While the Gettin's Good
- B-side: "Something to Believe In"
- Released: January 1967
- Recorded: November 28, 1966
- Studio: Bradley Studio
- Genre: Country; Nashville Sound
- Length: 2:32
- Label: Decca
- Songwriter: Bill Anderson
- Producer: Owen Bradley

Bill Anderson singles chronology
"I Get the Fever" (1966)	"Get While the Gettin's Good" (1967)	"No One's Gonna Hurt You Anymore" (1967)

"Get While the Gettin's Good" is a song written and first recorded by American country singer-songwriter Bill Anderson. It was released as a single in 1967 via Decca Records and became a major hit.

== Background and release ==
"Get While the Gettin's Good" was recorded on November 28, 1966, at the Bradley Studio, located in Nashville, Tennessee. The sessions were produced by Owen Bradley, who would serve as Anderson's producer through most of years with Decca Records. The song's B-side, "Something to Believe In," was also recorded at the same session.

"Get While the Gettin's Good" was released as a single by Decca Records in January 1967. The song spent 19 weeks on the Billboard Hot Country Singles before reaching number five in March 1967. "I Love You Drops" was Anderson's twelfth single to reach the top ten in his career. It was later released on his 1967 studio album, also called Get While the Gettin's Good.

== Track listings ==
7" vinyl single

- "Get While the Gettin's Good" – 2:32
- "Something to Believe In" – 2:57

== Chart performance ==
Chart (1967)	Peak position
US Hot Country Songs (Billboard)	5
