= Dust on Mother's Bible =

Studio album by Buck Owens
- Released: May 2, 1966
- Recorded: November 1965
- Studio: Capitol (Hollywood)
- Genre: Country
- Length: 27:29
- Label: Capitol ST-2443
- Producer: Ken Nelson

Buck Owens chronology
Roll Out the Red Carpet (1966)	Dust on Mother's Bible (1966)	Carnegie Hall Concert (1966)

Dust on Mother's Bible is the seventh studio album (and Owens twelfth overall) by Buck Owens and his Buckaroos, released in 1966. It reached Number one on the Billboard Country charts.

It was re-released on CD in 2003 by Sundazed Music.

== Reception ==
Professional ratings
Review scores
Source	Rating
Allmusic	4/5 stars

In his Allmusic review, critic Thom Jurek wrote of the CD reissue "...this is no ordinary country gospel album. This isn't the Carters or the Louvins. This is honky tonk country gospel done Bakersfield style. Owens toned down his Buckaroos approach not a bit to record this... the slippery guitar and pedal steel-heavy arrangements make this record feel more like a late-night barroom drinking and dancing set than something to be played for church. Dust on Mother's Bible is one of the great Buckaroos albums and once again displays Owens' singular place in the pantheon of country music."

== Track listing ==
=== Side one ===
1. "Pray Every Day" (Buck Owens, Red Simpson) – 2:09
2. "When Jesus Calls All His Children In" (Owens, Simpson) – 2:17
3. "I'll Go to Church Again with Momma" (Owens, Simpson) – 3:03
4. "Bring It to Jesus" (Buck Owens, Bonnie Owens) – 2:12
5. "Jesus Saved Me" (Owens, Simpson) – 2:25
6. "Would You Be Ready?" (Don Rich) – 2:01

=== Side two ===
1. "Dust on Mother's Bible" (Owens) – 3:30
2. "Satan's Gotta Get Along Without Me" (Owens, Simpson) – 2:04
3. "Where Would I Be Without Jesus" (Don Sessions) – 2:11
4. "Eternal Vacation" (Owens, Owens) – 2:58
5. "It Was with Love" (Loudilla Johnson, Don Rich) – 2:33
6. "All the Way with Jesus" (Owens, Owens) – 2:06

== Personnel ==
- Buck Owens – guitar, vocals
- Don Rich – guitar, fiddle, vocals
- Tom Brumley – pedal steel guitar
- Willie Cantu – drums
- Bobby Austin – bass
- Doyle Holly – guitar, vocals
- Wayne Stong – drums
- Red Simpson – guitar
- George French, Jr. – piano

== Charts ==
Chart performance for Dust on Mother's Bible
Chart (1966)	Peak position
US Top Country Albums (Billboard)	1
