= That's What It's Like to Be Lonesome =

1958 song by Bill Anderson

Single by Bill Anderson
- B-side: "The Thrill of My Life"
- Released: December 1958
- Recorded: August 1958
- Studio: Bradley Studios (Nashville, Tennessee)
- Genre: Country; Nashville Sound
- Length: 2:30
- Label: Decca
- Songwriter: Bill Anderson
- Producer: Owen Bradley

Bill Anderson singles chronology
"City Lights" (1958)	"That's What It's Like to Be Lonesome" (1958)	"Ninety-Nine" (1959)

"That's What It's Like to Be Lonesome" is a song written and recorded by American country singer-songwriter Bill Anderson. It was released as a single in December 1958 via Decca Records and became a major hit. A similar version was released by American country artist Ray Price the same year via Columbia Records.

== Bill Anderson version ==
"That's What It's Like to Be Lonesome" was recorded at the Bradley Studios, located in Nashville, Tennessee. The sessions were produced by Owen Bradley, who would serve as Anderson's producer through most of years with Decca Records.

"That's What It's Like to Be Lonesome" was released as a single by Decca Records in December 1958. It spent a total of 17 weeks on the Billboard Hot Country and Western Sides chart before reaching number 12 in February 1959. It became Anderson's first major hit as a music artist and his first charting record. It was not first released on a proper album. However, seven years later, it appeared on his compilation From This Pen.

=== Track listings ===
7" vinyl single

- "That's What It's Like to Be Lonesome" – 2:30
- "The Thrill of My Life" – 2:25

=== Chart performance ===
Chart (1958–1959)	Peak position
US Hot Country Songs (Billboard)	12

== Ray Price version ==
"That's What It's Like to Be Lonesome"

Single by Ray Price
- B-side: "Kissing Your Picture Is So Cold"
- Released: December 1958
- Studio: Columbia Studio
- Genre: Country; Nashville Sound
- Length: 2:44
- Label: Columbia
- Songwriter: Bill Anderson
- Producer: Don Law

Ray Price singles chronology
"City Lights" (1958)	"That's What It's Like to Be Lonesome" (1958)	"Heartaches by the Number" (1959)

"That's What It's Like to Be Lonesome" was recorded at the Columbia Studio, located in Nashville, Tennessee. The sessions were produced by Don Law.

"That's What It's Like to Be Lonesome" was released as a single by Columbia Records in December 1958. It spent a total of 19 weeks on the Billboard Hot Country and Western Sides chart before reaching number 7 in February 1959. It was one of many top ten hits for Price on the Columbia label and was followed by several number one hits as well. It was not first released on a proper album.

=== Track listings ===
7" vinyl single

- "That's What It's Like to Be Lonesome" – 2:44
- "Kissing Your Picture Is So Cold" – 2:39

=== Chart performance ===
Chart (1958–1959)	Peak position
US Hot Country Songs (Billboard)	7
