= Golden Guitar (song) =

Single by Bill Anderson

from the album Bright Lights and Country Music
- A-side: "I Love You Drops"
- Released: December 1965
- Recorded: September 9, 1965
- Studio: Columbia Recording Studios (Nashville, Tennessee)
- Genre: Country; Nashville Sound
- Length: 4:13
- Label: Decca
- Songwriters: Billy Gray; Curtis Leach
- Producer: Owen Bradley

Bill Anderson singles chronology
| "Bright Lights and Country Music" (1965) | "Golden Guitar" (1965) | "I Get the Fever" (1966) |

"Golden Guitar" is a song written by Billy Gray and Curtis Leach. It was first recorded by American country singer-songwriter Bill Anderson. It was released as a single in 1965 via Decca Records and became a major hit.

== Background and release ==
"Golden Guitar" was recorded on September 9, 1965, at the Columbia Recording Studios, located in Nashville, Tennessee. The sessions were produced by Owen Bradley, who would serve as Anderson's producer through most of years with Decca Records. Additional tracks were recorded at the session as well.

"Golden Guitar" was released as the B-side to Anderson's major hit "I Love You Drops." It was issued by Decca Records in December 1965. The song spent 13 weeks on the Billboard Hot Country Singles before reaching number 11 in April 1966. It was later released on his 1965 studio album Bright Lights and Country Music.

== Track listings ==
7" vinyl single

- "I Love You Drops" – 2:45
- "Golden Guitar" – 4:13

== Chart performance ==
| Chart (1965–1966) | Peak position |
|---|---|
| US Hot Country Songs (Billboard) | 11 |
