= I Love You Drops (song) =

Single by Bill Anderson

from the album I Love You Drops
- B-side: "Golden Guitar"
- Released: December 1965
- Recorded: December 30, 1964
- Studio: Columbia Recording Studio Nashville, TN
- Genre: Country; Nashville Sound
- Length: 2:45
- Label: Decca
- Songwriter: Bill Anderson
- Producer: Owen Bradley

Bill Anderson singles chronology
"Bright Lights and Country Music" (1965)	"I Love You Drops" (1965)	"I Get the Fever" (1966)

"I Love You Drops" is a song written and first recorded by American country singer-songwriter Bill Anderson. It was released as a single in 1965 via Decca Records and became a major hit.

== Background and release ==
"I Love You Drops" was recorded in 1965 at the Columbia Recording Studio, located in Nashville, Tennessee. The sessions were produced by Owen Bradley, who would serve as Anderson's producer through most of years with Decca Records. Additional tracks were recorded at the session as well.

"I Love You Drops" was released as a single by Decca Records in December 1965. The song spent 24 weeks on the Billboard Hot Country Singles before reaching number 4 in May 1966. "I Love You Drops" was Anderson's tenth single to reach the top ten in his career and his fifth to reach the top five. It was later released on his 1966 studio album I Love You Drops.

== Track listings ==
7" vinyl single

- "I Love You Drops" – 2:45
- "Golden Guitar" – 4:13

== Chart performance ==
Chart (1965–1966)	Peak position
US Hot Country Songs (Billboard)	4

== Cover versions ==
- In 1966, the song was covered by Vic Dana whose version reached #20 on the US, Easy Listening chart and #30 on the Hot 100.
