= Roll Out the Red Carpet (Buck Owens album) =

Studio album by Buck Owens
- Released: February 7, 1966
- Recorded: May – August 1965
- Studio: Capitol (Hollywood)
- Genre: Country
- Length: 32:57
- Label: Capitol ST-2443
- Producer: Ken Nelson

Buck Owens chronology
Christmas with Buck Owens (1965)	Roll Out the Red Carpet (1966)	Dust on Mother's Bible (1966)

Roll Out the Red Carpet for Buck Owens and his Buckaroos (or simply Roll Out the Red Carpet) is the sixth studio album (and Owens eleventh overall) by Buck Owens and his Buckaroos, released in 1966. It reached Number one on the Billboard Country charts and Number 106 on the Pop Albums charts.

It was re-released on CD in 1995 by Sundazed Music with two bonus tracks, both instrumental performances.

== Reception ==
Professional ratings
Review scores
Source	Rating
Allmusic	3/5 stars

In his Allmusic review, critic Lindsay Planer wrote "The stability of the lineup as well as a few Buckaroo instrumentals and vocal duets—featuring lead Buckaroo and longtime Owens collaborator Don Rich—contribute to the power of this oft-overlooked effort. The increasingly subtle yet significant impact of rock & roll can be heard throughout Roll Out the Red Carpet."

== Track listing ==
1. "Gonna Roll Out the Red Carpet" (Buck Owens) – 2:11
2. "He Don't Deserve You Anymore" (Artie Lang, Owens) – 2:57
3. "Cajun Fiddle" (Owens, Don Rich) – 1:42 (Instrumental)
4. "That's What I'm Like Without You" (Owens, Rich, Red Simpson) – 2:48
5. "I'm Layin' It on the Line" (Rich) – 2:24
6. "Hangin' on to What I Got" (Owens, Dusty Rhodes, Billye Spears) – 2:19
7. "We Split the Blanket" (Owens, Simpson) – 2:01
8. "Cinderella" (Buddy Mize) – 2:43
9. "Tom Cattin'" (Tom Brumley) – 2:08
10. "There Never Was a Fool" (Owens, Simpson) – 2:09
11. "After You Leave Me" (Buck Owens, Bonnie Owens) – 2:24
12. "(I'll Love You) Forever and Ever" (Owens) – 2:20
  1995 bonus tracks:
13. "Only You (Can Break My Heart)" (Owens) – 2:27 (Instrumental)
14. "My Heart Skips a Beat" (Owens) – 2:24 (Instrumental)

== Personnel ==
- Buck Owens – guitar, vocals
- Don Rich – guitar, fiddle, vocals, (lead vocal on "I'm Laying it On the Line")
- Doyle Holly – guitar, vocals, (lead vocal on "After You Leave Me")
- Tom Brumley – pedal steel guitar
- Willie Cantu – drums
- Bob Morris – bass
- Donald Frost – bass
- James Burton – guitar
- Jelly Sanders – guitar
- Red Simpson – guitar

== Charts ==
Chart performance for Roll Out the Red Carpet
Chart (1966)	Peak position
US Billboard 200	106
US Top Country Albums (Billboard)	1
