= City Lights (Ray Price song) =

1957 country music song by Bill Anderson

Single by Bill Anderson
- B-side: "No Song to Sing"
- Released: 1958
- Recorded: 1957
- Studio: University of Georgia
- Genre: Country
- Label: TNT
- Songwriter: Bill Anderson
- Producer: Bob Ritter

Bill Anderson singles chronology
"Take Me" (1957)	"City Lights" (1958)	"That's What It's Like to Be Lonesome" (1958)

"City Lights"

Single by Ray Price
- B-side: "Invitation to the Blues"
- Released: June 1958 (U.S.)
- Recorded: May 29, 1958
- Genre: Country
- Length: 2:59
- Label: Columbia
- Songwriter: Bill Anderson

Ray Price singles chronology
"Curtain in the Window" (1957)	"City Lights" (1958)	"That's What It's Like to Be Lonesome" (1958)

"City Lights"

Single by Mickey Gilley

from the album City Lights
- B-side: "Fraulein"
- Released: November 1974 (U.S.)
- Recorded: 1974
- Genre: Country
- Length: 2:48
- Label: Playboy 6015
- Songwriter: Bill Anderson
- Producer: Eddie Kilroy

Mickey Gilley singles chronology
"I Overlooked an Orchid" (1974)	"City Lights" (1974)	"Window Up Above" (1975)

"City Lights" is an American country music song written by Bill Anderson on August 27, 1957. He recorded it on a small Texas label called TNT Records in early 1958 to little acclaim. The song was first cut by Anderson in 1957 at the campus of the University of Georgia. In June 1958, Ray Price recorded it and his version hit number 1 on the Billboard Hot Country Songs singles chart in August 1958. Mickey Gilley's version also hit number 1 in June 1975.

== About the song ==
"City Lights" was one of Anderson's earliest major successes. Released in June 1958, Price's version of "City Lights" stalled at #2 on the Billboard magazine Most Played C&W by Disc Jockeys chart later that summer. When Billboard introduced its all-encompassing chart for country music (called "Hot C&W Sides") on October 20, "City Lights" was the new chart's first #1 song. It remained atop the chart for 13 weeks, its last week being January 12, 1959. The song spent a total of 34 weeks on the chart. The song was popular enough to cross over to US Hot 100, where it peaked at #71.

== Cover versions ==
- Dave Rich recorded this song in May 1958 and was the first to have it played on the Nashville radio stations.
- Ivory Joe Hunter recorded it in 1959 during his shift to country music late in his career and his version peaked at #92 on the US Billboard charts.
- Debbie Reynolds recorded it in 1960 and her version peaked at #55 on pop charts.
- Jerry Lee Lewis recorded it his 1965 album, Country Songs for City Folks.
- Connie Smith recorded the song in 1967 for her album Connie Smith Sings Bill Anderson, and album dedicated to Anderson.
- Mickey Gilley recorded a piano-backed honky-tonk rendition on his 1975 album, City Lights, and his version hit number 1 on the country charts in February 1975.
- Mel Tillis's 1989 version peaked at number 67 on the Billboard Hot Country Singles chart.
- Others who have recorded the song are: Connie Smith, Rick Trevino, Conway Twitty, Johnny Bush and Dottie West.
