= I'm a People (song) =

Single by George Jones

from the album I'm a People
- B-side: "I Woke Up from Dreaming"
- Released: 1966
- Recorded: 1965
- Genre: Country
- Length: 2:14
- Label: Musicor
- Songwriter(s): Dallas Frazier
- Producer(s): Pappy Daily

George Jones singles chronology
"Take Me" (1965)	"I'm a People" (1966)	"Old Brush Arbors" (1966)

"I'm a People" is a song by George Jones. It became a No. 6 hit single when it was released on the Musicor label in 1966. The song was written by Dallas Frazier, one of Jones' favorite composers at the time. "I'm a People" is one of the oddest novelties Jones ever recorded; the song compares the seemingly carefree existence of monkeys at a zoo with the dreary human enterprise of securing employment.
