= I'm a Nut =

Single by Leroy Pullins
- B-side: "Knee Deep"
- Released: June 1966
- Genre: Country, novelty
- Label: Kapp
- Composer: Leroy Pullins
- Lyricist: Leroy Pullins

"I'm a Nut" is a 1966 country novelty song by humorist Leroy Pullins. It was his only hit. "I'm a Nut" reached number 18 on the U.S. Billboard Country chart. It also crossed over to the pop charts of the U.S. and Canada, peaking at number 57 on the U.S. Hot 100 and number 71 on the Canadian RPM.

== Background ==
The song is frequently misattributed to Roger Miller, who never recorded the song. Pullins was, however, both an admirer and imitator of Miller.

On June 25, 2019, The New York Times Magazine listed Leroy Pullins among hundreds of artists whose material was reportedly destroyed in the 2008 Universal fire.

== Charts ==
"I'm a Nut" reached number 18 on the U.S. Billboard Country chart. It also crossed over to the pop charts of the U.S. and Canada, peaking at number 57 on the U.S. Hot 100 and number 71 on the Canadian RPM.

Chart (1966)	Peak position
Canada RPM Top Singles	71
U.S. Billboard Hot 100	57
U.S. Billboard Hot Country Singles	18
U.S. Cash Box Top 100	66

== Actualization of views ==
"I'm a Nut" has more than one million views on a single YouTube posting as of March 25, 2018. The post, however, misattributes the song to Roger Miller.
