= Open Up Your Heart (album) =

Studio album by Buck Owens
- Released: December 27, 1966
- Recorded: April 6 – August 23, 1966
- Studio: Capitol (Hollywood)
- Genre: Country
- Length: 31:44
- Label: Capitol ST-2640
- Producer: Ken Nelson

Buck Owens chronology
Carnegie Hall Concert (1966)	Open Up Your Heart (1966)	In Japan! (1967)

Singles from Open Up Your Heart
- 1. "Waitin' in Your Welfare Line" Released: January 3, 1966; 2. "Think Of Me" Released: May 2, 1966; 3. "Open Up Your Heart" Released: August 15, 1966

Open Up Your Heart is the eighth studio album (and Owens thirteenth overall) by Buck Owens and his Buckaroos, released in 1966. It reached Number one on the Billboard Country Albums chart.

It was re-released on CD in 1995 by Sundazed Music.

== Reception ==
Professional ratings
Review scores
Source	Rating
Allmusic	3/5 stars

In his Allmusic review, critic Stephen Thomas Erlewine wrote "...while it is still firmly within his trademark Bakersfield sound, there are slight moves away from his twangy, purer material and toward material that was just a little sillier and a little poppier... Open Up Your Heart doesn't resonate quite as strongly as earlier efforts from Owens, nor does it warrant as many repeat plays, but it is still crafted and played well enough to make it a satisfying listen."

== Track listing ==
=== Side one ===
1. "Open Up Your Heart" (Buck Owens) – 2:28
2. "Congratulations, You're Absolutely Right" (Owens, Don Rich, Red Simpson) – 2:38
3. "Think Of Me" (Don Rich, Estrella Olson) – 2:15
4. "In the Palm of Your Hand" (Owens) – 2:25
5. "You, You, Only You" (Rich, Simpson) – 2:06
6. "Sam's Place" (Owens, Simpson) – 1:59

=== Side two ===
1. "Waitin' in Your Welfare Line" (Owens, Rich, Nat Stuckey) – 2:18
2. "A Devil Like Me (Needs an Angel Like You)" (Rich, Simpson) – 2:09
3. "Heart of Glass" (Owens, Simpson) – 2:09
4. "Cadillac Lane" (Owens, Simpson) – 2:22
5. "No More Me and You" (Owens) – 2:03
6. "Goodbye, Good Luck, God Bless You" (Owens) – 2:12

1995 bonus tracks:

1. "Open Up Your Heart" (Owens) – 2:27
2. "Think of Me" (Estella Olson, Don Rich) – 2:13

== Recorded ==
- August 23, 1965, Capitol Recording Studio, Hollywood (6,9)
- August 24, 1965, Capitol Recording Studio, Hollywood (4,7)
- February 15, 1966, Capitol Recording Studio, Hollywood (3,11)
- April 1966, Capitol Recording Studio, Hollywood (1,2,5,8,10,12)

== Charts ==
Chart performance for Open Up Your Heart
Chart (1967)	Peak position
US Top Country Albums (Billboard)	1
