= Johnny Dollar (musician) =

American singer-songwriter

- Born: John Washington Dollar Jr. March 8, 1933
- Origin: Kilgore, Texas, U.S.
- Died: April 13, 1986 (aged 53)
- Genres: Country
- Occupation: Singer-songwriter
- Instrument: Guitar
- Years active: 1966–1971
- Labels: Date, Chart

Johnny Dollar (March 8, 1933 – April 13, 1986) was an American country and rockabilly musician.

== Biography ==
Dollar was born on March 8, 1933 in Kilgore, Texas, the son of John Washington Dollar and his wife Nellie Mae Morgan. On March 10, 1950, he enlisted in the United States Marine Corps at the age of seventeen. Dollar served during the Korean War period, receiving his discharge from active duty as a corporal on August 17, 1953.

Dollar relocated to Dallas in the early 1950s, where he worked in trucking and in a lumber yard. In 1952 he recorded a single for D Records, but it was not successful, and Dollar then found work as a DJ in Louisiana and New Mexico. There he began fronting a group called the Texas Sons and performed on the Louisiana Hayride in the middle of the 1950s. Following this he played with the Light Crust Doughboys, but soon returned to Dallas, where he began performing in the nascent style of rockabilly. Working with promoter Ed McLemore and songwriter Jack Rhodes, he recorded a number of songs, but they were never issued, and Dollar soon left music, taking up work as an insurance salesman in Oklahoma.

In 1964, he met Ray Price, and this encounter led to a contract with Columbia Records. Through the second half of the 1960s, he had a number of hits for Dot Records, Date Records, and Chart Records; among them were "Big Big Rollin' Man" (U.S. Country No. 48, 1968) and "Big Wheels Sing for Me" (U.S. Country No. 65, 1969). His best-selling album was 1968's Johnny Dollar, which reached No. 41 on the U.S. Billboard Country Albums chart. His name was often confused with that of radio's fictional detective Johnny Dollar, "the man with the action-packed expense account"; Dollar the singer was often publicized as "Mr. Action-Packed."

For much of the 1970s, Dollar did production work, for the New Coon Creek Girls, Jimmy Dickens, and Teddy Nelson, among others.

Johnny Dollar married and divorced four times, and became an alcoholic; late in his career he acquired throat cancer, and the operations destroyed his ability to sing. He committed suicide on April 13, 1986. He is buried in the Nashville National Cemetery.

=== Albums ===
Year	Album	US Country	Label
1968	Johnny Dollar	41	Date
1969	Big Rig Rollin' Man	—	Chart

=== Singles ===
Year	Single	Chart Positions		Album
Year	Single	US Country	CAN Country	Album
1966	"Tear-Talk"	49	—	singles only
1966	"Stop the Start (Of Tears in My Heart)"	15	—	singles only
1966	"Crazy Eyes"	—	—	singles only
1967	"Your Hands"	65	—	singles only
1967	"The Wheels Fell Off the Wagon Again"	47	—	Johnny Dollar
1968	"Everybody's Got to Be Somebody"	42	—	Johnny Dollar
1968	"Do-Die"	—	24	Johnny Dollar
1968	"Big Rig Rollin' Man"	48	—	Big Rig Rollin' Man
1969	"Big Wheels Sing for Me"	65	—	Big Rig Rollin' Man
1969	"If I Get Low Enough"	—	—	Big Rig Rollin' Man
1969	"Rain Falls in Denver Tonight"	—	—	Big Rig Rollin' Man
1970	"Truck Driver's Lament"	71	—	Big Rig Rollin' Man
1970	"Just a Swallow Away"	—	—	singles only
1971	"Highway in the Sky"	—	—	singles only
1971	"If We Make the Front Door Open Woman"	—	—	singles only
