= Bright Lights and Country Music (song) =

Single by Bill Anderson

from the album Bright Lights and Country Music
- B-side: "You Can Have Her"
- Released: August 1965
- Recorded: June 24, 1965
- Studio: RCA Victor Studios(Nashville, Tennessee)
- Genre: Country; Nashville Sound
- Length: 2:35
- Label: Decca
- Songwriters: Bill Anderson; Jimmy Gateley
- Producer: Owen Bradley

Bill Anderson singles chronology
"Certain" (1965)	"Bright Lights and Country Music" (1965)	"I Know You're Married (But I Love You Still)" (1965)

"Bright Lights and Country Music" is a song written and first recorded by American country singer-songwriter Bill Anderson. The track was also co-written with Jimmy Gateley. It was released as a single in 1965 via Decca Records and became a major hit.

== Background and release ==
"Bright Lights and Country Music" was recorded on June 24, 1965, at the RCA Victor Studios, located in Nashville, Tennessee. The sessions were produced by Owen Bradley, who would serve as Anderson's producer through most of years with Decca Records. Two additional tracks were recorded at the session as well.

"Bright Lights and Country Music" was released as a single by Decca Records in August 1965. The song spent 16 weeks on the Billboard Hot Country Singles before reaching number 11 in November 1965. It was later released on his 1965 studio album, also called Bright Lights and Country Music.

== Track listings ==
7" vinyl single

- "Bright Lights and Country Music" – 2:35
- "Born" – 2:30

== Chart performance ==
Chart (1965)	Peak position
US Hot Country Songs (Billboard)	11
