= I Love You Drops =

Studio album by Bill Anderson
- Released: August 1966
- Recorded: May 1966
- Studios: Bradley's Barn, Mount Juliet, Tennessee
- Genres: Country; Nashville Sound
- Label: Decca
- Producer: Owen Bradley

Bill Anderson chronology
| Bright Lights and Country Music (1965) | I Love You Drops (1966) | Get While the Gettin's Good (1967) |

Singles from I Love You Drops
- 1. "Certain" Released: February 1965; 2. "I Love You Drops" Released: December 1966; 3. "I Get the Fever" Released: August 1966

I Love You Drops is a studio album by American country singer-songwriter Bill Anderson. It was released in August 1966 on Decca Records and was produced by Owen Bradley. It was Anderson's fifth studio release and included three singles that became major hits on the Billboard country chart. The album would also become a success on the Billboard country albums list upon its release, becoming one of his most successful charting albums.

== Background and content ==
I Love You Drops was recorded in May 1966 at Bradley's Barn studio in Mount Juliet, Tennessee and produced by the studio's owner, Owen Bradley. Anderson had recorded all of his albums up to this point with Bradley. The album consisted of 12 tracks altogether. Among the album's tracks were cover versions of songs originally recorded by other artists in country music. The third track, "Talkin' to the Wall", was originally released as a single by Warner Mack. The second track on side two, "In the Summertime", was written and recorded by Roger Miller. The fourth track on side two was a cover of Hank Williams's "I'm So Lonesome I Could Cry". Seven of the songs were composed by Anderson. Among these songs was the record's title track and the track "Think I'll Go Somewhere and Cry Myself to Sleep".

== Release and reception ==
I Love You Drops was released in August 1966 on Decca Records. It was his fifth studio album release since joining Decca's roster in 1958. The album was released as a vinyl record, with six songs on side one and side two. I Love You Drops peaked at number one on the Billboard Top Country Albums chart on October 15, 1966. It became Anderson's highest-charting album and his only one to reach the top position on Billboard. Three singles released between 1965 and 1966 were included on the album. The song, "Certain", appeared on side two of the record and was issued as a single in February 1965. The song reached number 12 on the Billboard Hot Country Singles chart in May 1965. The title track was released in December 1965 as a single to radio. The song became a top ten hit, reaching number four on the Billboard country singles chart in May 1966. In August 1966, the track "I Get the Fever" was issued as the third and final single. The single became a number one hit on the country singles chart by November 1966, Anderson's third number one hit single as a recording artist. The album received two out of five stars from Allmusic in years following its initial release.

== Track listing ==
All tracks written by Bill Anderson, except where noted.

Side one
| No. | Title | Writer(s) | Length |
|---|---|---|---|
| 1. | "I Love You Drops" | | 2:45 |
| 2. | "Think I'll Go Somewhere (And Cry Myself to Sleep)" | | 2:39 |
| 3. | "Talking to the Wall" | Warner McPherson; Billy Montague | 2:28 |
| 4. | "When Liking Turns to Loving" | Kenny Young | 2:27 |
| 5. | "I Get the Fever" | | 2:06 |
| 6. | "Used To" | | 2:37 |

Side two
| No. | Title | Writer(s) | Length |
|---|---|---|---|
| 1. | "In the Summertime (You Don't Want My Love)" | Roger Miller | 2:10 |
| 2. | "Next Time You're in Tulsa" | | 2:45 |
| 3. | "Lovin' Pains" | Ned Miller | 2:05 |
| 4. | "I'm So Lonesome I Could Cry" | Hank Williams | 2:20 |
| 5. | "Nail My Shoes to the Floor" | | 2:22 |
| 6. | "Certain" | | 2:36 |

== Personnel ==
All credits are adapted from the liner notes of I Love You Drops.

Musical personnel

- Bill Anderson – lead vocals
- Harold Bradley – guitar
- Floyd Cramer – piano
- Ray Edenton – guitar
- Roy Huskey – bass
- The Jordanaires – background vocals
- The Anita Kerr Singers – background vocals
- Grady Martin – guitar
- Len Miller – drums
- Weldon Myrick – steel guitar
- Hargus "Pig" Robbins – piano
- Jerry Shook – guitar
- Joe Zinkan – bass

Technical personnel

- Owen Bradley – record producer
- Hal Buksbaum – photography

== Chart performance ==
| Chart (1966) | Peak position |
|---|---|
| US Top Country Albums (Billboard) | 1 |

== Release history ==
| Region | Date | Format | Label | Ref. |
|---|---|---|---|---|
| Canada | August 1966 | Vinyl | Decca | |
| United States | August 1966 | Vinyl | Decca | |
