= Johnny Seay =

American country music singer-songwriter (1940–2016)

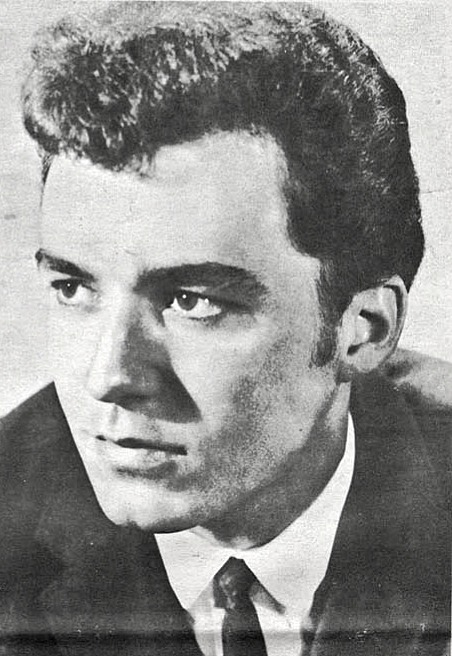
- Circa 1966

Background information
- Also known as: Johnny Sea
- Born: John Allan Seay, Jr. July 15, 1940
- Origin: Gulfport, Mississippi, U.S.
- Died: May 14, 2016 (aged 75)
- Genres: Country, folk
- Occupation(s): Musician, singer, songwriter
- Years active: 1958-2016
- Labels: NRC, Capitol, Philips, Warner Bros., Columbia, Viking, Lost Gold, Bear Family, Cross and Grave Ranch Brand Records.
- Website: johnnyseay.com

John Allan Seay, Jr. (July 15, 1940 – May 14, 2016) was an American country music singer, professionally known as Johnny Sea or Johnny Seay. His first hits came in the late 1950s, and his career saw a resurgence in the mid-1960s, particularly with the release of his spoken word single "Day For Decision".

== Biography ==
Seay was born in Gulfport, Mississippi, and grew up in Atlanta, and had his first major break in 1957 by winning a state talent show (whose runner-up was Bill Anderson). As a result of this he was offered a recording contract as well as the opportunity to appear on Louisiana Hayride and The Grand Ole Opry. In 1959, he scored a hit on the country charts with "Frankie's Man Johnny", and had a second in 1960 with "Nobody's Darling but Mine". Both his early hits were on NRC Records. After these hits he moved westward to become a cowboy.

In 1964 he began recording again and his songs, "My Baby Walks All Over Me" and "My Old Faded Rose", became country chart successes. Signing with Warner Bros. Records in 1966, he released the song "Day For Decision" which featured a background chorus singing "America". The recording was a country success and also peaked at No. 35 on the US pop charts; it was nominated for a Grammy Award but lost to a collection of recordings by Edward R. Murrow. Its accompanying album, which was a minor chart success, featured renditions of several popular patriotic tunes. After 1967, he began recording under his given name Johnny Seay again, and had two more country hits for Columbia Records, "Goin' to Tulsa" and "Three Six Packs, Two Arms and a Juke Box". His 1968 (released in 1970) song "Willie's Drunk and Nellie's Dyin'" were about his real-life neighbors Willie and Nellie York; after the song's release, the family was profiled in Life Magazine (July 17, 1970). Following his second rise to stardom, Seay returned to the life of a cowboy, moving to Justiceburg, Texas.

He died on May 14, 2016, when his single-engine plane clipped a cell telephone tower wire and crashed near West, Texas. He was 75.

== Discography ==
=== Albums ===
Year	Album	Chart Positions		Label
Year	Album	US Country	US	Label
1962	The Crown Prince of Country Music	—	—	Guest Star
1964	Johnny Sea	—	—	Philips
1964	The World of a Country Boy	17	—	Philips
1965	Live at the Bitter End	—	—	Philips
1965	Everybody's Favorite	—	—	Hilltop
1966	Day for Decision	27	147	Warner Bros.

=== Singles ===
Year	Single	Chart Positions			Album
Year	Single	US Country	US	CAN	Album
1959	"Frankie's Man, Johnny"	13	—	—	singles only
1960	"Nobody's Darling but Mine"	13	—	—	singles only
1964	"My Baby Walks All Over Me"	27	121	—	The World of a Country Boy
1965	"My Old Faded Rose"	19	—	—	single only
1966	"Day for Decision"	14	35	47	Day for Decision
1967	"Nothin's Bad as Bein' Lonely"	61	—	—	singles only
1968	"Going Out to Tulsa"	68	—	—	singles only
1968	"Three Six Packs, Two Arms and a Juke Box"	32	—	—	singles only
