= Leroy Pullins =

American singer-songwriter

- Born: Carl Leroy Pullins; November 12, 1940; Berea, Kentucky, U.S.
- Origin: Nashville, Tennessee, U.S.
- Died: May 5, 1984 (aged 43) Berea, Kentucky, U.S.
- Genres: Country
- Occupation: Singer
- Instruments: Vocals, guitar
- Years active: late 1950s-1967
- Label: Kapp
- Formerly of: The Le Sabers

Carl Leroy Pullins (November 12, 1940 - May 5, 1984) was an American country singer and guitarist. He is best known for his 1966 hit single "I'm a Nut".

== Biography ==
Carl Leroy Pulling was born November 12, 1940, in Berea, Kentucky. He played in a group he put together called the Le Sabers in the late 1950s and 1960s. This group included guitarist J.P. Pennington, who would go on to become a member of Exile.

In the 1960s, he relocated to Nashville. He gigged there for several years and eventually signed with Kapp Records in 1966; Kapp issued his debut single, "I'm a Nut", that same year. "I'm a Nut" was a hit novelty record written by Pullins himself, peaking on both the Billboard Hot 100 and Hot Country Songs charts. He released two albums on Kapp, one in 1966 and one in 1967, but further singles were not as successful as "I'm a Nut", and he eventually abandoned his career in music. After his music career ended, he moved back to Berea, Kentucky, and worked as a firefighter. He died of a heart attack at age 44 on May 5, 1984.

On June 25, 2019, The New York Times Magazine listed Leroy Pullins among hundreds of artists whose material was reportedly destroyed in the 2008 Universal fire.

== Discography ==
- I'm a Nut (Kapp, 1966)
- Funny Bones & Hearts (Kapp, 1967)

Year	Single	Peak chart positions		
Year	Single	US	US Country	CAN
1966	"I'm a Nut"	57	18	71
