= Only You (Can Break My Heart) =

- Norwegian release picture sleeve

Single by Buck Owens

from the album Your Tender Loving Care
- B-side: "Gonna Have Love"
- Released: July 5, 1965
- Genre: Country
- Length: 2:19
- Label: Capitol
- Songwriter(s): Buck Owens
- Producer(s): Ken Nelson

Buck Owens singles chronology
"Before You Go" (1965)	"Only You (Can Break My Heart)" (1965)	"Buckaroo" (1965)

"Only You (Can Break My Heart)" is a 1965 single by Buck Owens. The song was Owens's seventh number one in a row on the U.S. country singles chart. It spent one week at the top of the chart and a total of seventeen weeks. The B-side, "Gonna Have Love", peaked at number ten on the country chart.

== Chart performance ==
Chart (1965)	Peak position
U.S. Billboard Hot Country Singles	1
U.S. Billboard Bubbling Under Hot 100	20
