= Buckaroo (instrumental) =

Single by Buck Owens

from the album The Instrumental Hits of Buck Owens and His Buckaroos
- B-side: "If You Want a Love"
- Released: October 11, 1965
- Genre: Country
- Length: 1:57
- Label: Capitol
- Songwriter: Bob Morris
- Producer: Ken Nelson

Buck Owens singles chronology
"Only You (Can Break My Heart)" (1965)	"Buckaroo" (1965)	"Waitin' in Your Welfare Line" (1966)

"Buckaroo" is a 1965 instrumental country single by Buck Owens & The Buckaroos. The single was Buck Owens' fourth No. 1 on the country chart in less than a year. "Buckaroo" spent 16 weeks on the chart. The B-side, entitled "If You Want A Love", peaked at No. 24 on the country chart weeks later.

To date, it is the last instrumental to top the Hot Country Songs chart.

"Buckaroo" was also performed live by The Byrds, and a version can be heard on their album Live at the Fillmore - February 1969.

The piece has been covered by Leo Kottke, Danny Barnes, and others. The Buckaroos' recording was featured in the 2006 movie Idiocracy.

== Chart performance ==
Chart (1965)	Peak position
U.S. Billboard Hot Country Singles	1
U.S. Billboard Hot 100	60
