= The Harden Trio =

American country music group

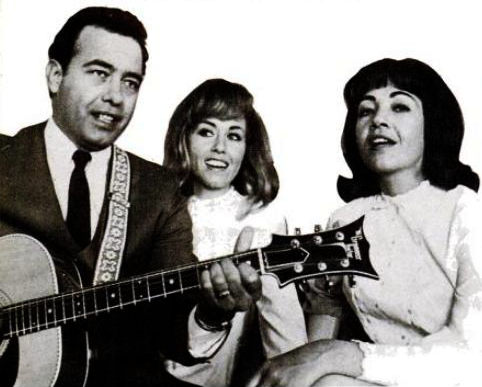
- The Harden Trio in 1968

Background information
- Also known as: The Hardens
- Origin: England, Arkansas, U.S.
- Genres: Country
- Years active: 1964–1968
- Labels: Columbia
- Past members: Arlene Harden; Bobby Harden; Robbie Harden

The Harden Trio was an American country music group comprised by Bobby Harden and his sisters, Robbie and Arlene. The trio recorded for Columbia Records between 1964 and 1968, charting six times on the Hot Country Songs charts. The trio's highest-peaking single was the number-two country and number 44 pop hit "Tippy Toeing".

== Biography ==
The Harden Trio, Bobby Harden with his sisters, Arlene (born Arleen) and Robbie (born Fern) was formed in England, Arkansas. They began performing as teenagers on the Ozark Jubilee and the Louisiana Hayride.

Robbie moved to Nashville first as part of the Browns, filling in for Bonnie Brown on the Grand Ole Opry and most road dates. The two families had grown up in the same area and worked together on the Ozark Jubilee. Bobby and Arlene soon followed, and the trio was reformed. In 1964, the trio signed with Columbia Records and released their debut single "Poor Boy", followed by their break-through crossover single "Tippy Toeing", both penned by Bobby Harden. "Tippy Toeing" spent 21 weeks on the Hot Country Songs charts and peaked at number two, in addition to peaking at number 44 on the Billboard Hot 100. The Harden Trio charted four more singles and released three albums before the trio disbanded in mid-1968.

Arlene and Robbie charted a final single as the Hardens on Columbia Records in 1968 with "Who Loves Who". Bobby briefly formed a new trio with Karen Wheeler and Shirley Michaels before going solo and recording for Starday Records, Mega Records, and United Artists Records through the mid-1970s, with several chart singles. Bobby last charted the number-48 country music single "One Step" on United Artists Records in 1975. His greatest success, however, was as a songwriter until his unexpected death on May 30, 2006, with two minor hits for Loretta Lynn, one for Reba McEntire, and two for Mark Chesnutt.

Arlene Harden also went solo and released two albums for Columbia Records as Arlene Harden and one for Capitol Records, reverting to the original spelling Arleen. She had 18 singles for Columbia Records, Capitol Records, and Elektra Records between 1967 and 1978, 15 of which were on Columbia. Her biggest chart success came with the female version of the Roy Orbison hit "Oh Pretty Woman", "Lovin' Man (Oh Pretty Woman)", in 1970. Also notable was "True Love Is Greater than Friendship" written for Arlene by Carl Perkins and used in the Robert Redford movie "Little Fauss and Big Halsy" the same year.

Robbie Harden joined the Johnny Cash Show in 1969 as part of the Carter Family, freeing June Carter to work front and center with Johnny Cash, as June became pregnant with their only child John Carter Cash. Together and individually, the Harden Trio provided backup vocals for other artists.

Bobby Harden co-wrote Mark Chesnutt's singles "Too Cold at Home" (1990) and "Ol' Country" (1992).

== Discography ==
=== Albums ===
Year	Album	Chart Positions		Label
Year	Album	US Country	US	Label
1966	Tippy Toeing	10	146	Columbia
1968	Sing Me Back Home	—	—	Columbia

=== Singles ===
Year	Single	Chart Positions			Album
Year	Single	US Country	US	CAN	Album
1966	"Tippy Toeing"	2	44	29	Tippy Toeing
1966	"Seven Days of Crying (Makes One Weak)"	28	—	—	singles only
1967	"Sneaking 'Cross the Border"	16	—	—	singles only
1968	"He Looks a Lot Like You"	56	—	—	Sing Me Back Home
1968	"Everybody Wants to Be Somebody Else"	47	—	—	singles only
1968	"Who Loves You" (as The Hardens)	64	—	—	singles only
