= I'm a People =

Studio album by George Jones
- Released: April 1966
- Recorded: June 1965, January 1966
- Studios: Columbia (Nashville, Tennessee)
- Genre: Country
- Label: Musicor
- Producer: Pappy Daily

George Jones chronology
Love Bug (1966)	I'm a People (1966)	We Found Heaven Right Here on Earth at "4033" (1966)

Singles from I'm a People
- 1. "I'm a People" Released: February 1966

I'm a People is an album by American country music artist George Jones. It was released in 1966 on the Musicor Records label. The album hit number one on the country chart.

George Bedard of AllMusic wrote, "One of the more consistent Musicor offerings, it features a good mix of uptempo honky tonk and novelty ("I'm a People", "Ship of Love" and "Blindfold of Love"), ballads (the eerie "The Lonely Know My Secret"), and sacred songs ("If You Believe" and "Old Brush Arbors"). "Four-O-Thirty Three" and the title track were both top ten country hits. I'm a People also includes the "World of Forgotten People" written by fellow country star Loretta Lynn.

Professional ratings
Review scores
Source	Rating
Allmusic	3/5 stars

== Track listing ==
No.	Title	Writer(s)	Length
1.	"I'm a People"	Dallas Frazier	2:09
2.	"Don't Think I Don't Love You"	Dallas Frazier	2:05
3.	"Ship of Love"	George Jones, Earl Montgomery	2:24
4.	"Once a Day"	Bill Anderson	2:20
5.	"If You Believe"	Darrell Edwards	2:10
6.	"Blindfold of Love"	Dallas Frazier, Clarence Selman	2:04
7.	"Four-o-Thirty-Three"	George Jones, Earl Montgomery	2:27
8.	"[I Don't Love You Anymore]]"	Bill Anderson	2:28
9.	"Lonely Know My Secret""	Earl Montgomery	2:23
10.	"World of Forgotten People"	Loretta Lynn	2:20
11.	"I Woke Up from Dreaming"	Dallas Frazier	2:33
12.	"Old Brush Arbors"	Darrell Edwards, Gordon Ardis	2:27

== Personnel ==
- George Jones – vocals
- The Jordanaires – vocal accompaniment

Technical

- Bob Scerbo – album coordinator
- Jack Kaufman – album design
- Charles Varon – cover photography

== Chart performance ==
Chart (1966)	Peak position
US Top Country Albums (Billboard)	1

== Charting Singles ==
Single	Chart	Peak position
I'm A People	U.S. Billboard Hot Country Singles	6
