= Think of Me (Buck Owens song) =

Single by Buck Owens

from the album Open Up Your Heart
- B-side: "Heart of Glass"
- Released: May 2, 1966
- Recorded: February 15, 1966
- Genre: Country
- Length: 2:15
- Label: Capitol
- Songwriter(s): Don Rich; Estella Olson
- Producer(s): Ken Nelson

Buck Owens singles chronology
"Waitin' in Your Welfare Line" (1966)	"Think of Me" (1966)	"Open Up Your Heart" (1966)

"Think of Me" is a song by Buck Owens and his Buckaroos, and included on their Open Up Your Heart (album) in 1966. It was written by Don Rich and Estrella Olson. The single reached number one on the country charts and stayed at the top for six weeks. "Think of Me" spent a total of twenty weeks on the country charts. "Think of Me" also peaked at number 74 on the Billboard Hot 100.

== Chart performance ==
Chart (1966)	Peak position
U.S. Billboard Hot Country Singles	1
U.S. Billboard Hot 100	74
