= Almost Persuaded (song) =

Single by David Houston

from the album Almost Persuaded
- B-side: "We Got Love"
- Released: June 1966 (U.S.)
- Recorded: April 7, 1966
- Studio: Columbia Recording Studio, Nashville, TN
- Genre: Country
- Length: 2:56
- Label: Epic
- Songwriters: Billy Sherrill; Glenn Sutton
- Producer: Billy Sherrill

David Houston singles chronology
"Sammy" (1966)	"Almost Persuaded" (1966)	"Where Could I Go? (But to Her)" (1966)

"Almost Persuaded" is a song written by Glenn Sutton and Epic Records producer Billy Sherrill and first recorded by David Houston in 1966. It is not to be confused with the Christian hymn of the same name.

== Content ==
The song is about a married man who, while patronizing a tavern, sees a beautiful young woman and is instantly smitten. Forgetting that he is married, he nearly succumbs to temptation. However, when the two share a slow dance, he notices a reflection of his wedding ring literally in her eyes and, remembering his vows to his wife, leaves.

== Legacy ==
"Almost Persuaded" spent nine weeks at No. 1 on the Billboard Hot Country Singles chart starting in August 1966 and has since gone on to become a country standard. The song was also a moderate pop hit, reaching twenty-four on the Billboard pop chart and was David Houston's only top 40 entry on the pop charts.

For 46 years and two months, no No. 1 song matched the chart-topping longevity of "Almost Persuaded," until Taylor Swift's "We Are Never Ever Getting Back Together" notched its ninth week atop the Billboard Hot Country Songs chart the week of December 15, 2012.

The song won a Grammy Award for Best Country & Western Recording of 1966.

== Other versions ==
Later in 1966, singer-comedian Sheb Wooley, performing as Ben Colder, released a parody version entitled "Almost Persuaded No. 2." Here, an already-drunk man enters a barroom, sits down at a table and attempts to make conversation with a young woman seated there. The two dance briefly until the woman's boyfriend steps in and makes the man leave. Colder's version reached No. 6 on the Hot Country Singles chart and No. 58 on the Billboard Hot 100.

Donna Harris, a young country singer from Colorado, recorded an answer song titled "He Was Almost Persuaded," which tells the story from the woman's perspective. The narrator, a lonely woman who inhabits a bar, sees the man enter the room and thinks she's finally found her man. After spending time with him, her hopes of a relationship come crashing down when she sees the man's wedding ring on his hand. Harris' single charted as high as #27 on the Record World country singles chart.

Some cover versions of the original song include:

- Crispian St. Peters released a cover of the song on his 1966 album Follow Me. It reached #52 on the UK Singles Chart in 1967.
- George Jones in 1967, and again in 1983
- The Statler Brothers in 1967
- Merle Haggard in 1986
- Tammy Wynette in 1967, who coincidentally recorded a number of duets with Houston
- Patti Page in 1966
- Charlie Rich in 1974
- Tanya Tucker in 1977
- Hank Williams, Jr. in 1990
- Johnny Paycheck in 1968
- Lefty Frizzell
- Bill Haley
- Etta James
- Dottie West
- Louis Armstrong
- Pozo-Seco Singers in 1967
- Country Teasers
- Beth Rowley
- Faron Young, appearing on numerous Faron Young greatest hits compilations and various artist compilations
- Hootenanny Singers made a Swedish version "Början till slutet" in 1967. Swedish lyrics by Stig Anderson aka Stikkan Anderson
- Ragnar Bjarnason recorded the tune in 1968 with Icelandic Lyrics as "Hafið lokkar og laðar".

== Charts ==
=== David Houston ===
Chart (1966)	Peak position
Canada Top Singles (RPM)	45
US Billboard Hot 100	24
US Hot Country Singles (Billboard)	1

=== Patti Page ===
Chart (1966)	Peak position
US Adult Contemporary (Billboard)	20
US Bubbling Under Hot 100 (Billboard)	13

=== Ben Colder ("Almost Persuaded No. 2") ===
Chart (1966)	Peak position
Canada Top Singles (RPM)	53
US Billboard Hot 100	58
US Hot Country Singles (Billboard)	6

=== Etta James ===
Chart (1969)	Peak position
Canada Top Singles (RPM)	71
US Billboard Hot 100	79
US Hot Rhythm & Blues Singles (Billboard)	32

=== Merle Haggard ===
Chart (1987)	Peak position
Canada Top Country Singles (RPM)	54
US Hot Country Singles (Billboard)	58
