= I Get the Fever =

Single by Bill Anderson

from the album I Love You Drops
- B-side: "First Mrs. Jones"
- Released: August 8, 1966
- Genre: Country
- Label: Decca
- Songwriter: Bill Anderson
- Producer: Owen Bradley

Bill Anderson singles chronology
"I Know You're Married (But I Love You Still)" (1966)	"I Get the Fever" (1966)	"Get While the Gettin's Good" (1967)

"I Get the Fever' is a 1966 single by Bill Anderson. "I Get the Fever" was Bill Anderson's third number one on the country charts. The single spent one week at number one and a total of nineteen weeks on the country charts.

== Chart performance ==
Chart (1966)	Peak position
U.S. Billboard Hot Country Singles	1
