= Red Simpson =

American country music singer-songwriter (1934–2016)

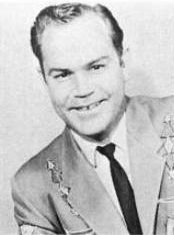
- Red Simpson in 1966

Background information
- Also known as: The Bard Of Bakersfield
- Born: Joe Cecil Simpson; March 6, 1934; Higley, Arizona, U.S.
- Died: January 8, 2016 (aged 81) Bakersfield, California, U.S.
- Genres: Country, truck-driving country
- Occupation: Singer-songwriter
- Instruments: Guitar, keyboard, banjo, fiddle, mandolin, pedal steel
- Years active: 1966–2016
- Label: Capitol

Joe Cecil "Red" Simpson (March 6, 1934 – January 8, 2016) was an American country music singer and songwriter best known for his trucker-themed country songs.

== Biography ==
Joe Cecil Simpson was born in 1934 in Higley, Arizona, and was raised in Bakersfield, California, the youngest of 12 children. At age 14, he wrote his first song. However, his father helped him listen to Ludwig van Beethoven.

Simpson was working at the Wagon Wheel in Lamont when Fuzzy Owen saw him and arranged for Simpson to work at his Clover Club as a piano player. He then got a job replacing Buck Owens at the Blackboard Club on weekends. Simpson was influenced by Owens, Merle Haggard and Bill Woods, who asked Simpson if he would write a song about driving trucks. (By the time Simpson handed him four truck songs, however, Woods had stopped recording.) Simpson began writing songs with Owens in 1962, including the Top Ten hit "Gonna Have Love".

In 1965, Capitol Records producer Ken Nelson was looking for someone to record some songs about trucking. His first choice was Haggard, who wasn't interested, but Simpson readily agreed. His first, Tommy Collins' "Roll, Truck, Roll", became a Top 40 country hit and Simpson recorded an album of the same name. That year he offered up two more trucking songs, both of which made it to the Top 50 or beyond. As a songwriter, he scored his first number one hit with "Sam's Place", recorded by Buck Owens. After that, Simpson decided to become a full-time writer. He returned to performing in 1971 with his Top Five hit "I'm a Truck", which had been written by postman Bob Staunton.

In 1972, he debuted on the Grand Ole Opry and had two more "truck" hits for Capitol. In 1976, Simpson signed to Warner Brothers and released "Truck Driver's Heaven". The following year, he teamed up with Lorraine Walden for a series of duets that included "Truck Driver Man and Wife". In 1979, Simpson appeared for the last time on the charts with "The Flying Saucer Man and the Truck Driver". Haggard recorded his song "Lucky Old Colorado" in 1988. Later that year Simpson was diagnosed with skin cancer and underwent surgery. He fully recovered and continued his writing and performing career.

In the mid 1990s, Simpson re-entered the studio to record a pair of duets with Junior Brown – "Semi Crazy" and "Nitro Express".

Simpson performed frequently in the Bakersfield area, including a regular Monday night gig at Trout's in Oildale. Simpson's last release was "Hey, Bin Laden". He was also working on a project with Windsor Music tentatively entitled The Bard of Bakersfield.

Simpson also appeared alongside Bakersfield business owner Gene Thome on his ode to Simpson, Haggard, and Owens "It's a Bakersfield Thing" released in early 2015.

Red Simpson died on January 8, 2016, at a hospital in Bakersfield, after suffering complications from a heart attack. He was 81.

Simpson was posthumously honored at the 2016 Ameripolitan awards. His son David Simpson accepted the "Founder of the Sound" award on his behalf.

Simpson completed his most recent album in December 2015 entitled Soda Pops and Saturdays with Mario Carboni. The album was recorded in Portland, Oregon, and featured 12 tracks. Simpson plays guitar and sings lead and backup vocals on this album. Carboni plays piano, strings, and backup vocals. The album was scheduled to be released on February 4, 2016; instead, it was released on January 9, 2016, after his death.

== Discography ==
=== Albums ===
Year	Album	US Country	Label
1966	Roll Truck Roll	7	Capitol
1966	The Man Behind the Badge	34	Capitol
1967	Truck Drivin' Fool	—	Capitol
1967	A Bakersfield Dozen	—	Capitol
1972	I'm a Truck and other songs of the road.	4	Capitol
1972	Very Real Red Simpson	—	Capitol
1973	Trucker's Christmas	—	Capitol
1973	20 Great Truck Hits	—	Capitol
1995	The Best of Red Simpson	—	King
2005	The Bard Of Bakersfield	—	
2016	Soda Pops and Saturdays	—	

=== Singles ===
Year	Single	Chart Positions		Album
Year	Single	US Country	CAN Country	Album
1957	"Sweet Love" (as "Glen Ayers Featuring Red Simpson [vocal] And The Keynotes")	—	—	single only
1966	"Roll Truck Roll"	38	—	Roll Truck Roll
1966	"The Highway Patrol"	39	—	The Man Behind the Badge
1966	"Sidewalk Patrol"	—	—	The Man Behind the Badge
1966	"Diesel Smoke, Dangerous Curves"	41	—	Truck Drivin' Fool
1967	"Jeannie with the Light Brown Cadillac"	—	—	A Bakersfield Dozen
1967	"Mini-Skirt Minnie"	—	—	A Bakersfield Dozen
1967	"He Reminds Me a Whole Lot of Me"	—	—	single only
1971	"I'm a Truck"	4	4	I'm a Truck
1972	"Country Western Truck Drivin' Singer"	62	—	Very Real Red Simpson
1972	"Hold On Ma'm (You Got Yourself a Honker)"	—	—	Very Real Red Simpson
1972	"Those Forgotten Trains"	—	—	single only
1973	"Awful Lot to Learn About Truck Drivin'"	63	—	20 Great Truck Hits
1973	"I'm a Pretty Good Man"	—	—	singles only
1974	"Certainly"	—	—	singles only
1974	"Honky Tonk Lady's Lover Man"	—	—	singles only
1975	"Truck Drivin' Man"	—	—	singles only
1975	"Inflation"	—	—	singles only
1976	"Truck Driver's Heaven"	92	—	singles only
1979	"The Flyin' Saucer Man and the Truck Driver"	99	—	singles only
1984	"Hello I'm a Truck" (re-recording of I'm a Truck)	—	—	singles only
1984	"Time Changes Everything"	—	—	singles only
1985	"Waitin' on a Catfish"	—	—	singles only

== See also ==
- Truck-driving country
- Honky Tonk
- Bakersfield Sound
- Dick Curless
