= Waitin' in Your Welfare Line =

- Norwegian release picture sleeve

Single by Buck Owens

from the album Open Up Your Heart
- B-side: "In the Palm of Your Hand"
- Released: January 3, 1966
- Genre: Country
- Label: Capitol
- Songwriter(s): Buck Owens; Don Rich; Nat Stuckey
- Producer(s): Ken Nelson

Buck Owens singles chronology
"Buckaroo" (1965)	"Waitin' in Your Welfare Line" (1966)	"Think of Me" (1966)

"Waitin' in Your Welfare Line" is a 1966 single by Buck Owens. The single was Owens' tenth number one on the U.S. country music chart. "Waitin' in Your Welfare Line" spent seven weeks at the top and a total of eighteen weeks on the country chart.

== Chart performance ==
Chart (1966)	Peak position
U.S. Billboard Hot Country Singles	1
U.S. Billboard Hot 100	57
Canadian RPM Top Singles	92
