= Open Up Your Heart (song) =

Single by Buck Owens

from the album Open Up Your Heart
- B-side: "No More Me and You"
- Released: August 15, 1966
- Genre: Country
- Length: 2:28
- Label: Capitol
- Songwriter: Buck Owens
- Producer: Ken Nelson

Buck Owens singles chronology
"Think of Me" (1966)	"Open Up Your Heart" (1966)	"Where Does the Good Times Go" (1966)

"Open Up Your Heart" is a 1966 single by Buck Owens. "Open Up Your Heart" was a number one country hit for Buck Owens, spending four weeks at the top spot and total of twenty weeks on the country charts.

A cover version was performed by Flaco Jiménez.

== Chart performance ==
Chart (1966)	Peak position
U.S. Billboard Hot Country Singles	1
