= Love Takes Time (Orleans song) =

1979 single by Orleans

- One of side-A labels of the US single

Single by Orleans

from the album Forever
- B-side: "Isn't It Easy"
- Released: March 1979
- Genre: Pop rock; soft rock
- Length: 3:51
- Label: Infinity Records
- Songwriters: Larry Hoppen, Marilyn Mason

Orleans singles chronology
"Business as Usual" (1977)	"Love Takes Time" (1979)	"Don't Throw Our Love Away" (1979)

"Love Takes Time" is a song by the soft rock band Orleans. It peaked at number 11 on the Billboard Hot 100 in May 1979 and was their biggest hit since their 1976 single "Still the One." The song also reached number 13 on the U.S. Adult Contemporary chart. In Canada, "Love Takes Time" peaked at #23 for two weeks.

It is arguably their third most popular song overall, behind "Dance with Me" and "Still the One," and their most popular song without founder John Hall. Written by Larry Hoppen and Marilyn Mason, it was the first track on the band's 1979 album Forever.

== Critical reception ==
The song received mostly positive reviews. Though popular, the song was called "bubbly but shallow" by the Lawrence Journal-World. Cash Box said it has "a strong, rolling chorus" as well as "synthesizer coloration, firm pounding beat, piano, searing guitar fills, tambourine and dynamic singing." Record World called it "a slick pop rocker right in the same mold [as previous Orleans' hits]."

== Charts ==
Chart (1979)	Peak position
Australia (Kent Music Report)	90
Canada RPM Top Singles	23
U.S. Billboard Hot 100	11
U.S. Billboard Easy Listening	13
