= Orleans II =

Studio album by Orleans
- Released: 1974
- Genre: Soft rock
- Length: 40:08
- Label: ABC-Dunhill
- Producer: Orleans & Johanna Hall

Orleans chronology
| Orleans (1973) | Orleans II (1974) | Let There Be Music (1975) |

Orleans II is the second album from the soft rock band Orleans. Orleans II was originally released in Japan and Europe in 1974. ABC Records chose not to release the album in the United States because they did not see any hits on the album, and the band was subsequently dropped from ABC Records. The label's parent company, the American Broadcasting Company, would use the band's later song "Still the One" as part of a promotional campaign.

== Critical reception ==
Professional ratings
Review scores
| Source | Rating |
|---|---|
| AllMusic | 2.5/5 stars |

Alex Henderson of AllMusic described the album as being "uneven and imperfect", but cited ABC's refusal to release the album in the United States as the primary reason for its lack of commercial success. He singled out "Dance with Me", "Wake Up", and "Let There Be Music" as highlights.

== Track listing ==
All songs written by John Hall & Johanna Hall except noted. All lead vocals by John Hall unless otherwise specified. Song credits and timings adapted from original LP.

Side One
| No. | Title | Writer(s) | Lead vocals | Length |
|---|---|---|---|---|
| 1. | "Let's Have A Good Time" | | | 5:17 |
| 2. | "Dance with Me" | | John Hall, Larry Hoppen, Lance Hoppen | 3:15 |
| 3. | "Wake Up" | | | 2:45 |
| 4. | "Let There Be Music" | Larry Hoppen, Johanna Hall | Larry Hoppen | 4:15 |
| 5. | "The Last Song" | | | 3:45 |

Side Two
| No. | Title | Writer(s) | Lead vocals | Length |
|---|---|---|---|---|
| 6. | "Sweet Johanna" | | | 5:08 |
| 7. | "Sunset" | Wells Kelly | Kelly | 3:50 |
| 8. | "Money" | Larry Hoppen | Larry Hoppen | 2:57 |
| 9. | "The Breakdown" | Eddie Floyd, Mack Rice, Rufus Thomas | | 8:39 |

- Note: original LP does not list song length for track 9.

== Personnel ==
- John Hall — guitars, lead vocals (all but 4, 7, 8), backing vocals; co-vocals (2), piano solo (2), piano (3), slide fuzz guitar (4), trumplex solo (5), steel guitar (6), drums (7), first guitar solo (9)
- Larry Hoppen — guitars (all but 8), backing vocals, keyboards; co-vocals (2), first electric bass (2), trumpet (3), lead electric guitar (4), lead vocals (4, 8), guitar solo (6), guitar (7), second guitar solo (9)
- Lance Hoppen — bass (all but 2), backing vocals; co-vocals (2)
- Wells Kelly — drums (all but 7), backing vocals, percussion, second electric bass (2), "Redneck" spoken line (6), piano (6, 7), lead vocals (7), organ (7)

Additional

Johanna Hall — "Lady Friend" spoken line (6)
