= Forever (Orleans album) =

Studio album by Orleans
- Released: January 1, 1979
- Recorded: October – December 1978
- Studio: Record Plant; Bearsville Studios
- Genre: Rock, pop rock
- Length: 39:44
- Label: Infinity
- Producer: Roy Cicala, Orleans

Orleans chronology
Waking and Dreaming (1976)	Forever (1979)	Orleans (1980)

Singles from Forever
- 1. "Love Takes Time" / "Isn't it Easy" Released: 1979; 2. "Don't Throw Our Love Away" / "The Flame and the Moth" Released: 1979; 3. "Forever" / "Keep on Rollin'" Released: 1979

Forever is the fifth studio album by American rock band Orleans, released in 1979 on Infinity Records.

It is the first album without John Hall, with keyboardist Bob Leinbach, and only album with multi-instrumentalist/vocalist Robert "Bobby" Martin (credited here as "R.A. Martin") as an official member. Both Martin and Leinbach would leave the lineup before the next album, though they still featured as supporting musicians on it.

== Background ==
The lineup change saw the group going in a different direction sonically, with newcomer Bob Leinbach handling most of the lead vocals. Little of the album's material consists of the folk/soft rock aspects from the band's previous efforts (the main exception being the title track) and it instead employs a more rock- and beat-focused sound.

Leinbach, Larry Hoppen, and Wells Kelly had previously played together during Hoppen's tenure in the band Boffalongo, of which Wells's older brother Sherman Kelly had also been a part.

This is one of two albums by the group where Wells Kelly is featured as a member but does not contribute any lead vocals, the other being 1975's Let There Be Music.

== Critical reception ==
Professional ratings
Review scores
Source	Rating
Music Week	2/4 stars
AllMusic	2/5 stars

Music Week gave the album only two out of four stars, but wrote that it "sounds like the Doobie Brothers on a good day." The Hartford Courant deemed it "lively without being lightweight."

Joe Viglione opined for AllMusic that the album had "not a bad track" and called it a "pleasant and valuable work," noting aspects of blues, gospel, and Southern rock throughout. He also complimented its "sterling vocals" and described "Everybody Needs Some Music" as being "very cheery", "Slippin' Away" as "brilliant", and title track "Forever" as something that "really should have followed 'Love Takes Time' up the charts."

Record World called the title track a "pretty love song" that "opens with a soft acoustic guitar and touching vocal that build in drama and intensity via a soaring electric lead bridge."

Cash Box said of the single "Don't Throw Our Love Away" that it is a "smart, rock-tinged pop song, with some neat lead and slide guitar work."

Writing for ClassicRockHistory.com, Millie Zeller included the three singles released from the album on her list of Orleans's top ten best songs, with "Don't Throw Our Love Away" at number nine, "Forever" at number eight, and "Love Takes Time" at number five.

== Alternate album photos ==
An alternate unused photo featuring the then-band members in matching gray turtlenecks was eventually used as the front cover for a cassette compilation released in 1986. Songs included "Love Takes Time", three from the band's 1980 album, and four from their 1973 debut.

Another photo from the shoot featuring the members in the same attire as the album cover (but standing in different positions) was used on the cover of the Japan release for the single "Love Takes Time."

== Track listing ==
Credits adapted from LP liner notes.

Side A
No.	Title	Writer(s)	Lead vocals	Length
1.	"Love Takes Time"	Larry Hoppen, Marilyn Mason	Larry Hoppen	4:03 (Note: This is the length printed on the liner notes, whereas the LP sticker labels the song as lasting 3:51.)
2.	"Don't Throw Our Love Away"	Larry Hoppen, Bob Leinbach, Mason	Larry Hoppen	4:50
3.	"Keep On Rollin'"	Leinbach	Leinbach, R.A. Martin	5:28
4.	"I Never Wanted To Love You"	Larry Hoppen, Leinbach, Mason	Leinbach	4:38

Side B
No.	Title	Writer(s)	Lead vocals	Length
5.	"Everybody Needs Some Music"	Kal David, Larry Hoppen, Leinbach, Mason	Leinbach	4:45
6.	"Slippin' Away"	David, Larry Hoppen, Leinbach, Mason	Leinbach	5:00
7.	"The Flame And The Moth"	Martin	Martin	3:55
8.	"Isn't It Easy"	Sherman Kelly, Wells Kelly	Leinbach	4:17
9.	"Forever"	Larry Hoppen, Leinbach, Mason	Larry Hoppen	2:48

Cassette listing

Side A
No.	Title	Length
1.	"Love Takes Time"	4:03
2.	"Everybody Needs Some Music"	4:45
3.	"Forever"	2:48
4.	"I Never Wanted To Love You"	4:38
5.	"The Flame And The Moth"	3:55

Side B
No.	Title	Length
6.	"Keep On Rollin'"	5:28
7.	"Isn't It Easy"	4:17
8.	"Don't Throw Our Love Away"	4:50
9.	"Slippin' Away"	5:00

== Personnel ==
Orleans

- Larry Hoppen – guitars, lead vocals (1, 2, 9), backing vocals, trumpet, piano (1), synthesizers (1), organ (2)
- Lance Hoppen – bass, backing vocals, Syndrums (1)
- Wells Kelly – drums, backing vocals, percussion, electric piano (8)
- Bob Leinbach – piano, lead vocals (3–6, 8), backing vocals, trombone (4)
- R. A. Martin – organ, lead vocals (3 and 7), backing vocals, tenor and baritone saxophone, string conductor, chimes (1), piano (2 and 7), french horns (4), saxophone solo (5), vibraslap (6), vibraphone (6), cabasa (6)

Additional musicians

- The Leanhorns (Larry Hoppen, Bob Leinbach, R. A. Martin) – horns (3, 5)
- Rubens Bassini – shaker (2), percussion (9)
- Maurice Bialkin – cello (4)
- David Sackson – viola (4)
- Peter Buonconsiglio – violin (4)
- Joe Malin – violin (4)
- Jimmy Maelen – shaker (8)

Production

- Producer: Roy Cicala, Orleans
- Engineers: Roy Cicala, Sam Ginsberg
- Photography: Elliott Landy, Alen MacWeeney

== Charts ==
Album

Chart (1979)	Position
US Billboard 200	76

Singles

Year	Single	Chart	Position
1979	"Love Takes Time"	US Billboard Hot 100	11
1979	"Love Takes Time"	US Billboard Adult Contemporary	13
1979	"Love Takes Time"	Canada RPM Top Singles	23
1979	"Love Takes Time"	Australia Kent Music Report	90
1979	"Don't Throw Our Love Away"	U.S. Cash Box Top 100	92
1979	"Forever"	US Billboard Adult Contemporary	24
