= All of the Above (John Hall album) =

Studio album by The John Hall Band
- Released: 1981
- Recorded: 1981
- Studio: Le Mobile
- Genre: Rock
- Label: EMI America Records
- Producers: John Hall; Richard Sanford Orshoff

The John Hall Band chronology
Power (1979)	All of the Above (1981)	Searchparty (1983)

Singles from All of the Above
- 1. "You Sure Fooled Me" Released: 1981; 2. "Crazy (Keep On Falling)" Released: 1981

All of the Above is the first album by The John Hall Band released in 1981. The title comes from a lyric sung in the track "Somebody's Calling."

The album peaked at #158 on the Billboard 200. "Crazy (Keep On Falling)" narrowly missed the Top 40, peaking at #42 on the Billboard Hot 100.

Bob Leinbach, who acts as the band's keyboardist, had replaced guitarist John Hall as lead vocalist upon his leave from the band Orleans, appearing on their 1979 album Forever. He also guested as a songwriter and backing vocalist for their following album in 1980.

Another track titled "Lovelight," written by Leinbach and John and Johanna Hall, was recorded for the album but wound up as the B-side to "You Sure Fooled Me" in 1982. The song features Leinbach on lead vocals.

== Track listing ==
All tracks are written by John and Johanna Hall, additional writers where noted. All lead vocals by John Hall except where noted.

Side A
No.	Title	Writer(s)	Lead Vocals	Length
1.	"You Sure Fooled Me"	Bob Leinbach		3:58
2.	"Crazy (Keep On Falling)"	Leinbach, Eric Parker	Leinbach with Hall and John Troy	4:37
3.	"Can't Stand To See You Go"			4:05
4.	"Star In Your Sky"			3:23
5.	"Somebody's Calling"	Leinbach	Leinbach	4:16

Side B
No.	Title	Writer(s)	Lead Vocals	Length
6.	"What You Do To Me"			3:45
7.	"Earth Out Tonight"			6:52 (Note: Misprint on label, song actually runs 4:52.)
8.	"The Touch"			5:16
9.	"Don't Hurt Me"			4:09
10.	"Clouds"	Leinbach	Leinbach	3:57

== Personnel ==
The John Hall Band

- John Hall - vocals, guitar
- Bob Leinbach - vocals, keyboards
- John Troy - vocals, bass
- Eric Parker - drums, percussion

Production

- Producer: John Hall, Richard Sanford Orshoff
- Engineers: Bill Bottrell, Clifford Bunnell, David Marquette, Guy Charbonneau, Mitch Gibson
- Photography: Brian Hagiwara

== Charts ==
Album

Year	Chart	Position
1981	Billboard 200	158

Singles

Year	Single	Chart	Position
1981	"Crazy (Keep On Falling)"	Billboard Hot 100	42
1981	"Crazy (Keep On Falling)"	Billboard Top Tracks	13
