= Let There Be Music =

Studio album by Orleans
- Released: March 1975
- Recorded: September–October 1974
- Genre: Soft rock
- Length: 37:14
- Label: Asylum
- Producer: Chuck Plotkin

Orleans chronology
| Orleans II (1974) | Let There Be Music (1975) | Waking and Dreaming (1976) |

Singles from Let There Be Music
- 1. "Let There Be Music" Released: 1975; 2. "Dance with Me" Released: 1975; 3. "Business as Usual" Released: 1977

Let There Be Music is the third album from the soft rock band Orleans, the first album on Asylum Records. The album spawned two charting singles, including the title cut, which peaked at No. 55 in May 1975, and "Dance With Me", which peaked at No. 6 in October 1975 on the US Billboard Hot 100.

Cash Box said of the title track that "a great power chorded intro leads into a crisp rocking number which is reminiscent of the sound of the Doobie Brothers, The Who, and about a half dozen others" and that the "anthem-like qualities of this rocker and fine instrumental interplay add up to a hit." Record World said of the track that the "band comes up with the California brand of country rock boogie a la Eagles." Classic Rock History critic Millie Zeller rated it as Orleans 3rd best song, calling it a "soft rock delight" and stating that "The guitar riffs of this song were simply amazing. If you want that great tune perfect as you’re on the road, 'Let There Be Music' is it."

== Track listing ==
All songs written by John Hall and Johanna Hall except noted. All lead vocals by John Hall unless otherwise specified.

Side One
| No. | Title | Writer(s) | Lead vocals | Length |
|---|---|---|---|---|
| 1. | "Fresh Wind" | | | 3:21 |
| 2. | "Dance With Me" | | | 3:20 |
| 3. | "Time Passes On" | | | 3:35 |
| 4. | "Your Life My Friend" | | | 3:14 |
| 5. | "Let There Be Music" | Larry Hoppen, Johanna Hall | Larry Hoppen | 4:04 |

Side Two
| No. | Title | Writer(s) | Lead vocals | Length |
|---|---|---|---|---|
| 6. | "Business As Usual" | | | 4:12 |
| 7. | "Cold Spell" | | | 4:18 |
| 8. | "Ending Of A Song" | Larry Hoppen, Marilyn Mason | Larry Hoppen | 3:19 |
| 9. | "Give One Heart" | | | 4:03 |
| 10. | "You've Given Me Something" | | | 3:48 |

== Personnel ==
- John Hall - guitars, lead and backing vocals, mandolin, percussion, electric piano (6)
- Larry Hoppen - guitars, lead and backing vocals, keyboards, synthesizers, melodica, trumpet, bass (2)
- Lance Hoppen - bass (all but 2), backing vocals
- Wells Kelly - drums, backing vocals, percussion
