= Reach (Orleans song) =

1977 single by soft rock group Orleans

Single by Orleans

from the album Waking and Dreaming
- B-side: "Sweet Destiny"
- Released: January 1977
- Genre: Soft rock
- Length: 3:58
- Label: Asylum
- Songwriters: Johanna Hall, John Hall
- Producer: Chuck Plotkin

Orleans singles chronology
"Still the One" (1976)	"Reach" (1977)	"Spring Fever" (1977)

"Reach" is a song written by John Hall and Johanna Hall that was first released by Orleans on their 1976 album Waking and Dreaming. It was released as a single as a follow-up to the band's top ten hit "Still the One".

== Music and lyrics ==
Classic Rock History critic Millie Zeller described "Reach" as having "similar characteristics as 'Still the One' but with less funk and more groove." Cash Box stated that it "exhibits harmonic similarities to ["Still the One"], substituting a funky beat for the shuffle. Tampa Tribune critic Michael Kilgore stated that the song's ending sounded like a "Sunday morning gospel service choir." The News critic Scott Garside similarly said that the song has a "gospel sort of vocalizing."

Record World suggested that it sounds similar to the early Doobie Brothers. The Ormskirk Advertiser suggested that the song is in the style of Linda Ronstadt's album Hasten Down the Wind, for which the Halls wrote a song.

== Reception ==
The Cash Box and Record World reviews both took into account the fact that "Reach" was the follow up to the big hit "Still the One", with Cash Box stating that with "Reach" the band was "reluctant to pull the punches" and Record World stating that "there appears to be no let-up in sight." Billboard recommended the single. Minneapolis Star critic Jon Bream described "Reach" as "soulful" and said that it demonstrates the band's versatility. The Lowell Sun critic Nick Foustas used "Reach" as an example of how Orleans can "rock without rolling."

Zeller rated "Reach" as Orleans' seventh best song, stating, "If you're looking for a good cheer-up song to get out of a bummer mood, 'Reach' is it."

== Chart performance ==
Despite generally favorable reviews, the single did not perform as well as "Still the One", peaking at No. 51 on the Billboard Hot 100, No. 45 on the Cash Box Top 100 Singles chart, and No. 54 on the Record World singles chart. It also reached No. 47 on the Billboard Easy Listening chart. In Canada, it peaked at No. 31.

== Cover versions ==
"Reach" has been covered by several artists, including Barbara Mandrell. Donna Fargo covered the song on her 1978 album Dark-Eyed Lady. Chicago Sun-Times critic Pat Harris rated her version of "Reach" as the best song on the album.
