= Waking and Dreaming =

Studio album by Orleans
- Released: August 1976
- Studio: Sound Factory (Hollywood)
- Genres: Soft rock, pop rock
- Length: 39:35
- Label: Asylum
- Producer: Chuck Plotkin

Orleans chronology
Let There Be Music (1975)	Waking and Dreaming (1976)	Forever (1979)

Singles from Waking and Dreaming
- 1. "Still the One" Released: August 1976; 2. "Reach" Released: January 1977; 3. "Spring Fever" Released: April 1977

Waking and Dreaming is the fourth studio album by American pop rock band Orleans. It was released in August 1976 by Asylum Records. The album reached number 30 on Billboard's Top LPs & Tape chart and spawned the singles "Still the One" (number five) and "Reach" (number 51).

Two non-album tracks were released as B-sides. The song "Siam Sam", written and sung by Wells Kelly (and co-written by Chris Myers), backed "Still the One" while the song "Sweet Destiny", another Larry Hoppen/Marilyn Mason composition sung by Larry, appeared on the single "Reach".

== Critical reception ==
Professional ratings
Review scores
Source	Rating
AllMusic	3/5 stars

Cash Box said of "Reach" that it "exhibits harmonic similarities to ['Still the One'], substituting a funky beat for the shuffle." Other reviewers found gospel music elements in "Reach." Record World said that it has "an early Doobie Brothers-type sound."

Cash Box said of "Spring Fever" that "a saxophone gets it sizzling, and sinewey pop melodies and confident harmonies from this versatile collection of musicians keep it going." Record World said "With the snow melting, the temperature rising, and the days getting longer, it's time for spring fever. After coming off two successful chart records, the group is poised to herald in the season in fine style."

== Track listing ==
All tracks are written by John Hall and Johanna Hall, except where noted. All lead vocals by John Hall unless otherwise specified.

Side one
No.	Title	Lead vocals	Length
1.	"Reach"		4:20
2.	"What I Need"	John Hall, Larry Hoppen	4:42
3.	"If I Don't Have You"		4:03
4.	"Waking and Dreaming"	John Hall, Larry Hoppen	6:20
5.	"Sails"		2:06

Side two
No.	Title	Writer(s)	Lead vocals	Length
6.	"Still the One"		Larry Hoppen	3:53
7.	"The Bum"	Wells Kelly	Kelly	2:31
8.	"Golden State"			3:38
9.	"The Path"			3:52
10.	"Spring Fever"	Larry Hoppen, Marilyn Mason	Larry Hoppen	4:10

== Personnel ==
Orleans

- John Hall – electric guitar (1–4, 6, 7, 9, 10), lead vocals (1–5, 8, 9), backing vocals (6, 7, 10) , acoustic guitar (5, 8), synthesizer (5)
- Larry Hoppen – electric piano (1, 5, 6, 10), backing vocals (1, 3, 5, 7, 9), lead vocals (2, 4, 6, 10), electric guitar (2, 4, 6, 7), organ (1, 3, 9), synthesizer (3), clavinet (10)
- Lance Hoppen – bass (all tracks), backing vocals (all but 8), synthesizer (8)
- Wells Kelly – drums (1, 2, 4, 7, 9, 10), backing vocals (1–4, 6, 9, 10), piano (3, 8), percussion (9), lead vocals (7), lead electric guitar (7), organ (4), tambourine (6)
- Jerry Marotta – drums (all but 5), percussion (5, 9), congas (1), backing vocals (10)

additional personnel

- Linda Ronstadt – backing vocals (3)
- Blue Mitchell – trumpet (8)
- Michael Brecker – saxophone (10)

== Charts ==
Chart (1976)	Peak position
Australia (Kent Music Report)	87
Canada Top Albums/CDs (RPM)	34
Dutch Albums (Album Top 100)	17
US Billboard 200	30
