= Wells Kelly =

- Born: April 7, 1949; New Orleans, Louisiana, United States
- Died: October 28, 1984 (aged 35) London, England, United Kingdom
- Genres: Pop rock, soft rock
- Occupations: Musician, singer
- Instruments: Drums, percussion, keyboards, guitar, vocals
- Years active: 1969–1984
- Formerly of: Boffalongo, King Harvest, Orleans, Neverland Express

Wells Kelly (April 7, 1949 – October 28, 1984) was an American pop and soft rock musician who primarily played drums and percussion.

Born in New Orleans in 1949, Kelly grew up in New York. His father, Burnham Kelly, was a dean of architecture at Cornell University. Kelly had four siblings: Leila, Sherman (born 1943), Hugh, and Katharine "Kathy" Kelly (born 1947), and he frequently collaborated with Sherman throughout the '70s.

From 1968 to 1971, he played drums for Boffalongo, who recorded the original version of "Dancing in the Moonlight". The song, written by Sherman after surviving a near-fatal assault by a St. Croix gang, failed to chart. In 1971, Boffalongo disbanded, and members went on to form King Harvest and Orleans. Kelly was a member of both groups; King Harvest from 1970 to 1971, and then Orleans from 1972 to 1981. A year after leaving King Harvest, the band, that included Sherman, had a hit with their own song from their previous band Boffalongo with "Dancing in the Moonlight". Their version went to number thirteen in the US in February and March 1973.

With Orleans, Kelly played on all of their highest-selling songs, such as "Dance with Me" (number six in 1975), "Still the One" (number five in 1976), and "Love Takes Time" (number eleven in 1979). He also wrote a total of eight songs for the band (typically one per album) and sang lead on all but two of them.

Kelly left Orleans in early 1981 to relocate to New York City. He went on to join Steve Forbert's Flying Squirrels in 1981 and did a few shows in the Central New York area with Mick Ronson. He also played with Clarence Clemons and the Red Bank Rockers.

Kelly joined the Neverland Express, the backing band for Meat Loaf, in 1983. He played on one album, Bad Attitude, and played on Meat Loaf's song "Nowhere Fast", both released a month after Kelly's death. He played on two tours: "Midnight at the Lost & Found" (1983), and "Bad Attitude" (1984–1985), the latter of which Kelly died mid-way through.

Both Wells and Sherman often wrote songs for their own bands. In one of Sherman's most recent solo albums Burnin' the Candle, he finished some of the unfinished songs the two brothers wrote together.

== Songs with Orleans ==
All songs written and sung by Wells Kelly unless otherwise stated.

From Orleans (1973)

- "Mountain"

From Orleans II (1974)

- "Sunset"

From Waking and Dreaming (1976)

- "The Bum"

Non-album b-side to "Still the One" (1976)

- "Siam Sam", co-written by Chris Myers

From Forever (1979)

- "Isn't It Easy", co-written by Sherman Kelly and sung by Bob Leinbach

From Orleans (1980)

- "Bustin' Loose", co-written by Sherman Kelly
- "Dukie's Tune" (instrumental)
- "Oughta Daughta (Think I Will)", co-written by Sherman Kelly and Dave "Doc" Robinson

== Death ==
On October 29, 1984, Wells died while on tour in England with Meat Loaf. After a night of partying with members from the band Tower of Power, his body was found on the front stairs of a London flat at which he was staying. According to pathologist Dr. Ian West, a post mortem examination revealed "high levels of morphine and cocaine" in Kelly's body. "Death came from the drummer inhaling his own vomit 'induced by snorting a mixture of heroin and cocaine'." He was reportedly last seen alive drinking with Huey Lewis.
