= Orleans (album) =

Studio album by Orleans
- Released: 1973
- Studio: Muscle Shoals
- Genre: Soft rock
- Length: 45:14
- Label: ABC
- Producer: Barry Beckett and Roger Hawkins

Orleans chronology
Orleans (1973)	Orleans II (1974)

Orleans is the debut album from the R & B influenced rock band Orleans. Formed in 1972 by multi-instrumentalists/vocalists John Hall, Larry Hoppen, and Wells Kelly, the group had been playing at bars in upstate New York as a trio for several months before Hoppen's then 18-year-old brother Lance was added to take up the position of bassist.

== Track info ==
The album included live concert staples and all time Orleans favorites- "Please Be There" "Two Faced World" and "Tongue Tied". The song "Half Moon" originally appeared on Janis Joplin's final studio album Pearl, released in 1971. It was subsequently included as part of a suite on John Hall's third solo album Power, released in 1979.

== Reception ==
Professional ratings
Review scores
Source	Rating
AllMusic	2.5/5 stars
Christgau's Record Guide	C+

AllMusic rated the album two and a half stars, describing it as not "a blockbuster...but the rock fans who acquired the LP could hear Orleans' potential."

Music critic Robert Christgau wrote a brief review of the album, describing it as "pleasant", but opining that "John Hall doesn't sing as tasty as he plays. The only impressive song is 'Half Moon.'"

== Track listing ==
All songs written by John Hall and Johanna Hall except noted. All lead vocals by John Hall unless otherwise specified.

Side One
No.	Title	Length
1.	"Please Be There"	3:48
2.	"If"	5:02
3.	"Two-Faced World"	4:30
4.	"Turn Out the Light"	5:18
5.	"Tongue-Tied"	4:19

Side Two
No.	Title	Writer(s)	Lead vocals	Length
6.	"Half-Moon (Seven Song)"		John Hall, Larry Hoppen	3:38
7.	"Mountain"	Wells Kelly	Kelly	3:21
8.	"Wanderlust"			4:25
9.	"Ticonderoga Moon"			3:07
10.	"Stoned"	Larry Hoppen	Larry Hoppen	3:10
11.	"It All Comes Back Again"			4:35
Total length:				45:14

== Personnel ==
Orleans

- John Hall – Lead vocals (1–6, 8, 9, 11), Vocals (7), Lead guitar (2, 3, 6, 7, 8), Guitar (2, 5, 8), Acoustic guitar (9), Electric guitar (1, 3, 4, 9, 11), Dobrolin (11), Rhythm Guitar (6, 7), Steel drums (2), Organ (8), Drums (10)
- Wells Kelly – Lead vocals (7), Vocals (1–5, 8, 9, 11), Piano (7, 10), Drums (1–9, 11), Timbales (2), Cowbell (5)
- Larry Hoppen – Lead vocals (6, 10), Vocals (1–5, 7–11), Lead guitar (2, 5, 6–8), Guitar (2, 5, 8), Electric guitar (3, 10), Rhythm guitar (6), Slide guitar (10), Piano (1, 9), Electric Piano (7, 11), Organ (1, 3, 4, 6, 11), "patriotism (patriotic airs)" [track 3]
- Lance Hoppen – Vocals, Bass

Additional personnel

- Barry Beckett – Piano (4)
- Roger Hawkins – Tambourine (2), Congas (3, 6), Cowbell (10), Jew's harp (10)
- Marilyn Mason – Backup vocals (4), Photography
- "The Dixie Doo-Doo Birds" – Backup vocals (4)
- The gang – handclaps
- Tom Bellfort – photography
