= John Hall (album) =

Studio album by John Hall
- Released: 1978
- Recorded: 1978
- Studio: Wally Heider Recording Studio; Record Plant; Sound Factory West
- Genre: Folk rock, pop rock
- Length: 37:19
- Label: Asylum Records
- Producer: John Hall; Charles Plotkin

John Hall chronology
Action (1970)	John Hall (1978)	Power (1979)

Singles from John Hall
- 1. "Night" Released: 1978

Professional ratings
Review scores
Source	Rating
AllMusic	2/5 stars

John Hall is the self-titled second album by John Hall released in 1978. It was Hall's first solo album after leaving Orleans due to internal stresses and disagreements over material and musical direction.

== Track listing ==
All tracks are written by Johanna and John Hall except where indicated.

Side 1
No.	Title	Writer(s)	Length
1.	"Night"		4:53
2.	"Break of Day"		4:40
3.	"Messin' Round the Wrong Woman"	John Hall	3:10
4.	"Trust Yourself"		5:00

Side 2
No.	Title	Length
5.	"Give Me The Right"	3:30
6.	"The Fault"	4:52
7.	"Good Enough"	4:37
8.	"Voyagers"	6:37

== Personnel ==
Credits adapted from original LP sleeve.

- John Hall - lead vocals, guitar, Polymoog synthesizer (1), clavinet (6), backing vocals (tracks 1, 2, 5, 6)
- Wilton Felder - bass guitar (1–5, 7)
- David Hungate - bass guitar (6, 8)
- Chuck Rainey - bass guitar (3)
- Sonny Burke - clavinet (7)
- David Paich - electric piano (8)
- Bill Payne - synthesizer (6, 8)
- Joe Sample - electric piano (1, 2, 5), piano (3), clavinet (4)
- Steve Gadd - drums (2–4, 6–8)
- Ed Greene - drums (1, 5)
- Milt Holland - congas, tambourine (2), cuíca (4)
- Joel Tepp - harmonica (3)
- Michael Brecker - saxophone (3), tenor saxophone (7)
- David Sanborn - alto saxophone (7)
- Phillip Ballou - backing vocals (4)
- Lowell George - backing vocals (2)
- Garland Jeffreys - backing vocals (6)
- David Lasley - backing vocals (1, 2, 4, 5, 7)
- Arnold McCullough - backing vocals (1, 4, 7)
- Lynn Pitney - backing vocals (2, 5, 7)
- Bonnie Raitt - backing vocals (2)
- Carly Simon - backing vocals (6–8)
- James Taylor - backing vocals (6, 8)
- The Persuasions - backing vocals (3)
- David Campbell - string arrangement (5)

Production

- Arrangement - John Hall
- Advice and Consent - Johanna Hall
- Art Direction and Design - Kosh
- Producer - John Hall, Chuck Plotkin
- Engineers - Val Garay
- Photography - David Alexander, John Hall, Johanna Hall, Catherine Sebastian, Kitty Wise
- Recorded by - Peter Granet, Steve Hirsch, Mark Howlett, Jay Krugman
