= Let There Be Music (song) =

1975 single by Orleans

Single by Orleans

from the album Orleans II and Let There Be Music
- B-side: "Give One Heart"
- Released: April 1975
- Recorded: 1974
- Genre: Soft rock
- Length: 3:30 (single version); 4:04 (album version)
- Label: Asylum
- Songwriters: Larry Hoppen, Johanna Hall
- Producer: Chuck Plotkin

Orleans singles chronology
"If" (1974)	"Let There Be Music" (1975)	"Dance with Me" (1975)

"Let There Be Music" is a song written by Larry Hoppen and Johanna Hall that was first released by Orleans on their 1974 album Orleans II and again as the title track to their 1975 album Let There Be Music. It was the lead single from Let There Be Music, peaking at No. 55 on the Billboard Hot 100.

== Music and lyrics ==
Roanoke Times critic Rome Scott described "Let There Be Music" as a boogie. Cash Box said that "a great power chorded intro leads into a crisp rocking number which is reminiscent of the sound of the Doobie Brothers, The Who, and about a half dozen others" and that the "anthem-like qualities of this rocker and fine instrumental interplay add up to a hit." Press and Sun Bulletin critic Chris Carson also suggested a similarity to the Doobie Brothers. Green Bay Press-Gazette critic Pat Moran said that the song "is patterned almost exactly after the [Doobie] Brothers' first hit "Listen to the Music" but it rocks a bit more than Toulouse Street. Record World said of the track that the "band comes up with the California brand of country rock boogie a la Eagles." Joy McLain of The Wichita Beacon said that the song has "the steady rock beat for a radio song." AllMusic critic David Cleary described it as a power pop song and as "an agreeably forceful and hook-filled electric guitar-based selection featuring an especially ardent vocal." Fellow AllMusic critic Alex Henderson described it as "anthemic".

Carl Quicquaro of the Valley Advocate Amherst suggested that the lyrics "Let there be music/let it shine like the sun" and "Everybody's got to have some fun" "speak for themselves" to provide an uplifting conclusion to side 1 of the album.

The single version differs from the album version in that the album version ends with a longer instrumental section.

== Reception ==
Henderson considered "Let There Be Music" to be one of the best songs on Orleans II and one of the songs that indicated that ABC Records made a mistake by dropping the band after that album was released. Tampa Tribune critic Michael Kilgore described the song as a hit. McLain also regarded the single as a hit, but preferred the longer album version. Orlando Sentinel critic H. Nathan called it a "great tune", describing it as a "get-off-your-feet, unabashed rocker". Billboard chose it as a "Top Single Pick". Classic Rock History critic Millie Zeller rated it as Orleans 3rd best song, calling it a "soft rock delight" and stating that "The guitar riffs of this song were simply amazing. If you want that great tune perfect as you're on the road, 'Let There Be Music' is it."

== Chart performance ==
In the United States, the single peaked at No. 55 on the Billboard Hot 100, No. 53 on the Cash Box Top 100 Singles chart and No. 49 on the Record World singles chart. It peaked at No. 96 in Canada.
