= Crazy (Keep On Falling) =

1981 single by The John Hall Band

Single by The John Hall Band

from the album All of the Above
- B-side: "Can't Stand To See You Go"
- Released: 1981
- Studio: Le Mobile
- Genre: Rock
- Length: 3:56
- Label: EMI America Records
- Songwriter(s): Bob Leinbach; Eric Parker; John Hall; Johanna Hall
- Producer(s): John Hall; Richard Sanford Orshoff

The John Hall Band singles chronology
"You Sure Fooled Me" (1981)	"Crazy (Keep On Falling)" (1981)	"Love Me Again" (1983)

"Crazy (Keep On Falling)" is a song by American group The John Hall Band. It was released as a single in 1981 from their album All of the Above. John Hall and Bob Leinbach share lead vocals on the song, with vocal cameos from bassist John Troy.

The song narrowly missed the Top 40 on the Billboard Hot 100, peaking at No. 42. However, it was a Top 20 on the Mainstream Rock charts, peaking at No. 13. This became the band's biggest hit.

== Chart performance ==
Chart (1981)	Peak position
US Billboard Hot 100	42
US Billboard Top Rock Tracks	13
