= Power (John Hall album) =

Studio album by John Hall
- Released: 1979
- Recorded: 1979
- Studios: Bearsville, Atlantic
- Genres: Folk rock, pop rock
- Length: 36:32
- Label: ARC
- Producer: John Hall

John Hall chronology
John Hall (1978)	Power (1979)	All of the Above (1981)

Singles from Power
- 1. "Power" Released: 1979; 2. "Home at Last” / “Plutonium is Forever" Released: 1979

Power is the third album by John Hall, released in 1979 on Columbia Records subsidiary ARC Records. The title track is used as an anthem against nuclear power.

== Critical reception ==
Professional ratings
Review scores
Source	Rating
AllMusic	4/5 stars

The Hartford Courant noted that "when Hall speeds the tempo up ... the result is a lively, danceable froth that's extremely fresh and fun." The Greenville News called the title track "the first good political song about nuclear energy."

== Track listing ==
All tracks are written by John Hall and Johanna Hall.

Side A
No.	Title	Length
1.	"Home at Last"	4:40
2.	"Power"	4:46
3.	"Heartbreaker"	3:26
4.	"So"	5:38

Side B
No.	Title	Length
1.	"Run Away with Me"	3:02
2.	"Firefly Lover"	3:51
3.	"Arms" / "Half Moon"	6:31
4.	"Cocaine Drain"	4:38

2015 bonus track
No.	Title	Length
9.	"Plutonium Is Forever"	2:58

== Personnel ==
Credits adapted from album liner notes.

- John Hall - lead vocals, guitar, electric piano (1), bass (3), keyboards (3), cowbell (3), string synthesizer (1B)
- Eric Parker - drums
- Jody Linscott - percussion
- David Schwartz - bass
- Louis Levin - keyboards
- Bryan Cumming - saxophone, second guitar (4, 2B)
- Lynn Pitney - background vocals
- Phil Ballou - background vocals
- John Troy - supplemental vocals (1, 3, 2B)
- Jon Pousette-Dart - supplemental vocals (1, 3, 2B)
- Tony Levin - bass (2, 4)
- Mike Mainieri - vibraphone (4B)
- Carly Simon - background vocals (2)
- James Taylor - background vocals (2)

Production

- Producer: John Hall
- Engineers: Gene Paul (Atlantic), Lew Hahn (Atlantic), John Holbrook (Bearsville)
- Photography: Eric Meola (front cover), Aaron Rapoport (back cover), Bob Hower, John Curtis, Louis Levin, Peter Simon, Tony Levin
