= Orleans (band) =

American rock band

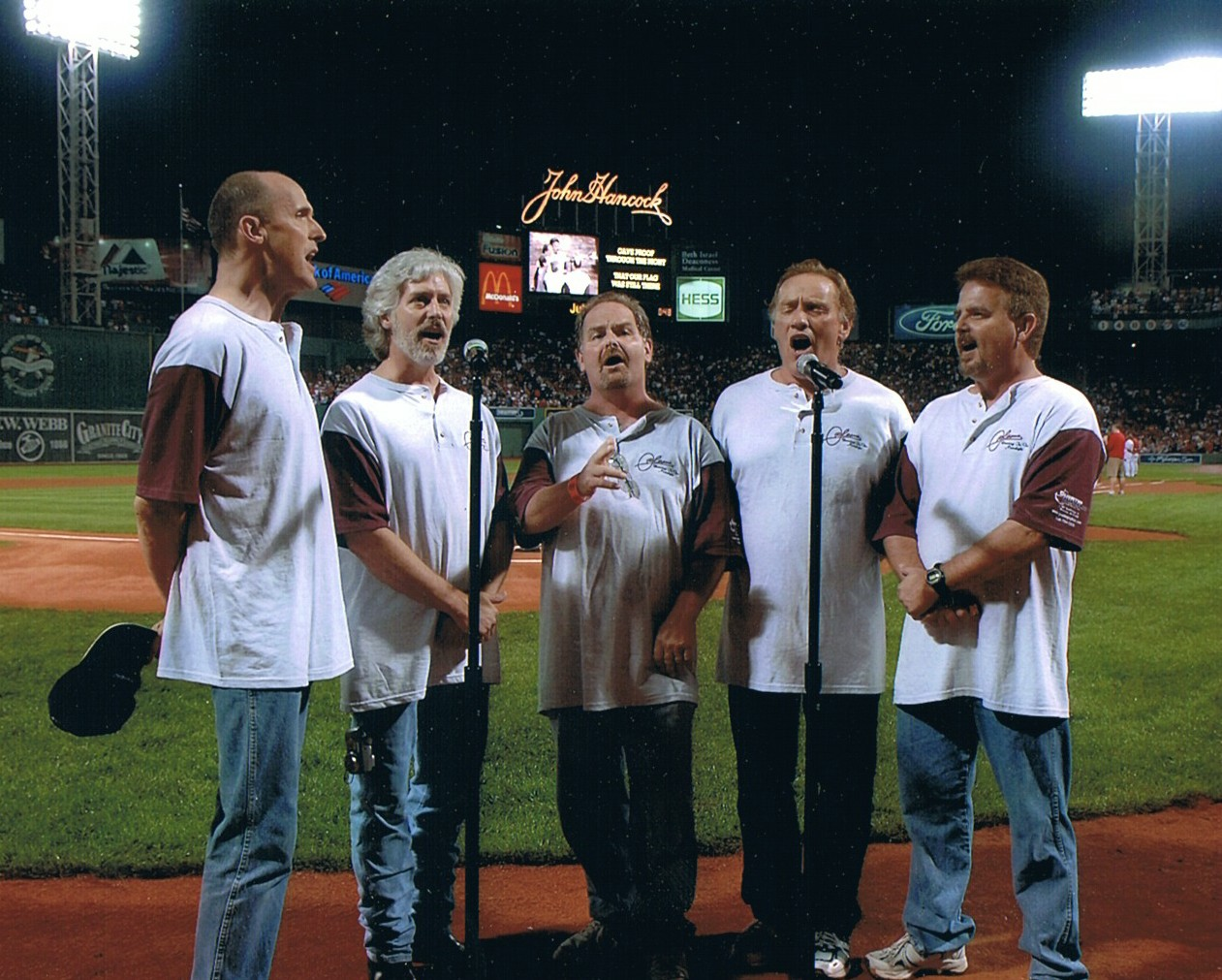
- Orleans singing the national anthem at Fenway Park in Boston in July 2006

Background information
- Origin: Woodstock, New York, U.S.
- Genres: Pop rock, soft rock
- Years active: 1972–present
- Labels: ABC Dunhill, Asylum, Infinity, MCA, Radio, Spectra, Fuel, Sunset Blvd.
- Members: Lance Hoppen; Tom Lane; Lane Hoppen; Brady Spencer; Tony Hooper
- Past members: John Hall; Larry Hoppen; Wells Kelly; Jerry Marotta; Bob Leinbach; R.A. Martin; Charlie Shew; Michael Mugrage; Nick Parker; Peter O'Brien; Paul Branin; Charlie Morgan; Daniel "Chip" Martin

Orleans is an American pop rock band formed in 1972 in Woodstock, New York, by John Hall, Larry Hoppen, and Wells Kelly. Larry's younger brother, bassist Lance Hoppen, and drummer Jerry Marotta joined the band in 1972 and 1976, respectively. The band is best known for its hits "Dance with Me" (number six in 1975); "Still the One" (number five in 1976), from the album Waking and Dreaming; and "Love Takes Time" (number 11 in 1979). The group's name evolved from the music it was playing when it formed; their music is inspired in part by Louisiana artists, including Allen Toussaint and the Neville Brothers.

== History ==
=== 1960s ===
Drummer Wells Kelly, the son of Cornell University's dean of architecture, Burnham Kelly, first met John Hall, an in-demand session player and member of the group Kangaroo, in the late 1960s, when he played with him in a group called Thunderfrog and later appeared on John's first solo album, Action, released in 1970.

In 1970, Wells joined the first incarnation of King Harvest, which had a hit two years later with the song "Dancing in the Moonlight", a song written by Wells' brother, Sherman Kelly, and first recorded by Boffalongo, an Ithaca-based group of which Wells and Sherman were previously members.

Hall and his wife, Johanna, gained some notability when their song "Half Moon" appeared on Janis Joplin's posthumous album Pearl. Hall had recorded and toured with Taj Mahal and Seals and Crofts and decided to relocate from New York City to Woodstock, New York, at the request of producer and pianist John Simon, to be close to Bearsville Studios and the musical scene there.

Larry Hoppen grew up in Bay Shore on Long Island and relocated to Ithaca, New York, to attend college there in the late 1960s. He was a founding member of Boffalongo, which had two albums released by United Artists. Sherman Kelly and "Dancin' in the Moonlight" appeared on the second album. Wells Kelly joined the band after that.

=== 1970s ===
After a swing through Europe playing guitar behind Karen Dalton on a Santana tour, Hall decided to start his own band in Woodstock. After months of playing the Café Expresso with different rhythm sections, Hall called his old friend Wells Kelly in Ithaca in December 1971 and asked him to join his group. Multi-instrumentalist Kelly accepted the offer on the condition that he play piano.

The group initially included Hall on guitar, Roy Markowitz on drums, Bill Gelber on bass, and Kelly on electric piano. When Markowitz and Gelber left the band, Wells told John about his former bandmate from Boffalongo. Hall, who had once jammed with him before, encouraged Kelly to call Larry Hoppen, who accepted the invitation to join the new group, christened Orleans by Wells in late January 1972. For months, they played as a trio, often switching instruments throughout the show.

Larry's 18-year-old brother, Lance Hoppen, was brought into Orleans around Halloween 1972 to play bass, freeing up Larry to play more guitar and keyboards.

Orleans found its core audience touring the clubs and college circuit of the Northeastern United States, crossing paths with other up-and-comers such as Bonnie Raitt, Tom Waits, and Hall & Oates. Rolling Stone called Orleans "the best unrecorded band in America". Showcase performances in New York City led to a recording contract with ABC Dunhill Records and the release of the self-titled debut album in the fall of 1973, which had been recorded in Muscle Shoals, Alabama, with producers Roger Hawkins and Barry Beckett at the helm. Reviewing Orleans in Christgau's Record Guide: Rock Albums of the Seventies (1981), Robert Christgau said, "In case you're interested, this band is mucho hot among Eastern rock cognoscenti (read, know-it-alls). Very pleasant, too, although John Hall doesn't sing as tasty as he plays. The only impressive song is 'Half Moon.' Anything Janis Joplin used to sing is impressive, so that may not mean much."

The group's second record, Orleans II recorded at Bearsville Studios, was originally released in Europe in 1974, but ABC declined to release it in the US since management felt "no hit singles" were on the album (despite the fact that it contained the first-version recordings of both "Let There Be Music" and "Dance With Me") and dropped the group from the label. After the band's later successes, Orleans II was finally put out in America in 1978, combined with the first album as a double LP called Before the Dance. It was also released as a CD in Japan later on in the 1990s under its originally slated title Dance with Me.

In the meantime, the group was back to showcasing for a new record deal. When Orleans was heard at Max's Kansas City, they were signed and produced by Chuck Plotkin, then head of A&R for Asylum Records. The band then scored its first Billboard Hot 100 charting single "Let There Be Music" (number 55), taken from their third album, Let There Be Music, released in March 1975.

The follow-up single, "Dance with Me" (reshaped and re-recorded from Orleans II with Plotkin at the helm), went to number six on the pop charts and the band became part of mainstream of American pop music. Atypical of the high-energy, earthy, rhythm and blues and rock n' roll mix of styles they had been previously identified with, "Dance with Me" cast the band in a more "soft-rock" light and landed them a tour with Melissa Manchester.

While recording their next album, Waking and Dreaming, in early 1976, the group was joined by second drummer Jerry Marotta, freeing Wells Kelly to sing more and play keyboards.

"Still the One" (released in July 1976), from Waking and Dreaming, cemented Orleans' relationship with the American public. While the single peaked eventually at number five, the band was on a major cross-country 10-week tour with label mate Jackson Browne, ending in November 1976.

In January 1977, the single was chosen as the theme song for the ABC television network (the parent of ABC Records) and has since been used for an endless number of commercials and movie soundtracks.

=== John Hall departs ===
The follow-up, "Reach", with John Hall on lead, peaked at number 51 in March 1977. Around then, however, internal stresses and disagreements over material and musical direction prompted guitarist and songwriter Hall to announce his intention to leave the band in search of a solo career, which he did in June 1977, after touring commitments were satisfied. Marotta departed not long afterwards to join Hall & Oates and eventually moved to Peter Gabriel's band.

After several months of mulling things over and working with other musicians (Lance and Larry joined Marotta in the backing band for Garland Jeffreys, while Kelly worked with the Beach Boys), the Hoppen brothers and Kelly decided to continue the band in late 1977, bringing in new members Robert Martin (vocals, keyboards, sax, horns) and Connecticut musician Bob Leinbach (vocals, keyboards, trombone), who had played with Larry Hoppen and the Kellys in Boffalongo during the Ithaca years and had completed a stint with the group the Fabulous Rhinestones. The new lineup signed a contract with the Infinity Records label and their debut there, Forever (April 1979), produced the number-11 hit "Love Takes Time". Collectively, the three Hot 100 top 20 Orleans hits have been aired over 10 million times.

=== 1980s ===
In 1980, Infinity went bankrupt after an album with performances by Pope John Paul II (who was on a tour of the U.S. in the fall of 1979) failed to sell. Infinity was absorbed into MCA Records, which failed to promote their follow-up album, simply titled Orleans. This last, recorded in Woodstock, featured only the Hoppens and Wells Kelly as Orleans proper, since the others had left earlier in the year. Nonetheless, the album featured guest appearances from all past members, including John Hall, who was in the process of forming the John Hall Band with Leinbach as a member. Orleans was produced by Englishman Robin Lumley, mixed at Trident Studios in London, and featured Lumley's friend, Phil Collins, contributing backing vocals to one track.

Just after recording that 1980 release, the group added Dennis "Fly" Amero (guitars, vocals) to replace Leinbach. The live lineup still featured Robert (R.A.) Martin, and the band completed a tour of amusement parks that summer, only to learn that their accountant had misappropriated funds, leaving them in debt. Martin left, "Fly" stayed, Larry and Lance recruited their younger brother, Lane Hoppen, to play keyboards, and drummer Charlie Shew, at that time performing under the pseudonym Eric Charles, was brought aboard to play alongside Wells Kelly. Charlie then replaced Wells when he left by early 1981 to relocate to New York City.

Orleans then signed with the fledgling Radio Records and recorded their next album, One of a Kind, in Fort Lauderdale, Florida, in the summer of 1982. The album (released in September 1982) put forth a more "early '80s style" pop, keyboard-driven sound and included new band member Michael Mugrage, replacing "Fly" Amero on guitar at the request of the album's producers, Don Silver and Ben Wisch. Jerry Marotta briefly rejoined the band to play on the album, but was soon replaced by drummer Nicholas Parker after its release. Radio Records also went bankrupt just as One of a Kind was hitting the record store shelves.

Without a record label, Orleans struggled in the early 1980s, playing mostly small clubs in the Northeast. At the same time, Larry and Lance formed a side group, Mood Ring, with Bob Leinbach, Nicholas Parker, singer/songwriter Robbie Dupree (of "Steal Away" fame), and various other Woodstockers who drifted in and out to play for fun, mostly at parties and clubs. Mood Ring played some club dates in 1984 and 1985, billed as Robbie Dupree and Orleans (in the late 2000s, Mood Ring reconvened to do occasional concert dates).

After a few touring the Northeast club circuit, during a two-week stint in Bermuda in September 1984, Larry lost his voice just one day into the gig due to a combination of air conditioning and high humidity. After this, he returned to his home in Woodstock and decided to take some time off to allow his voice to heal. At that low point, both Larry and Lance felt that was the likely end of Orleans.

Kelly went on to join Steve Forbert's Flying Squirrels in 1981 and did a few shows in the Central New York area with Mick Ronson. He also played with Clarence Clemons and the Red Bank Rockers before joining Meat Loaf's Neverland Express in 1983. On October 29, 1984, Wells died while on tour in England with Meat Loaf. After a night of partying, his body was found on the front stairs of a London flat where he was staying. According to pathologist Dr. Ian West, a post mortem examination revealed "high levels of morphine and cocaine" in Kelly's body. "Death came from the drummer inhaling his own vomit 'induced by snorting a mixture of heroin and cocaine'."

Wells Kelly's untimely death was the catalyst for a reunion of Hall and the Hoppen brothers. John Hall and Bob Leinbach joined Larry in Ithaca to play at a memorial for Wells (Lance was unable to make the wake due to another commitment). Here, John and Larry decided to continue with Orleans.

In 1985, through the Halls' connections in Nashville, the reunited lineup of John Hall, Larry Hoppen, Lance Hoppen, and Bob Leinbach cut the album Grown Up Children (June 1986), with guest appearances from heavyweights such as Chet Atkins, Ricky Skaggs, Steve Wariner, and Bela Fleck, under the direction of Nashville producer/MCA label chief Tony Brown. Although this album had some playing by John and Larry, most of the instrumental tracks were played by session players, including guitarist Richard Bennett, drummer Larrie London, and bassist David Hungate, with the Orleans members providing mostly vocals.

During their Nashville period, the band added bassist Glen Worf and drummer Paul Cook (who was eventually replaced by Tommy Wells) for concert dates, as Lance switched to acoustic guitar.

By late 1987, John and Larry began to realize that while Nashville was a great place for them as songwriters, it was not so accommodating to Orleans' career as a band. For about the next two years, Orleans was in a fairly dormant state, again basing their activities back in Woodstock, New York. In early 1989, Lance was offered an opportunity to move to Nashville to work with old friends Kathie Baillie and Michael Bonagura as part of the then-hit RCA act Baillie & the Boys. For a while, he was no longer available for all Orleans' gigs, so bassist Jim Curtin became Lance's substitute, as needed, between 1989 and 1994. Meanwhile New York native Peter O'Brien had been brought in on drums.

Orleans slowly re-established their presence in the Northeast over the next few years.

=== 1990s ===
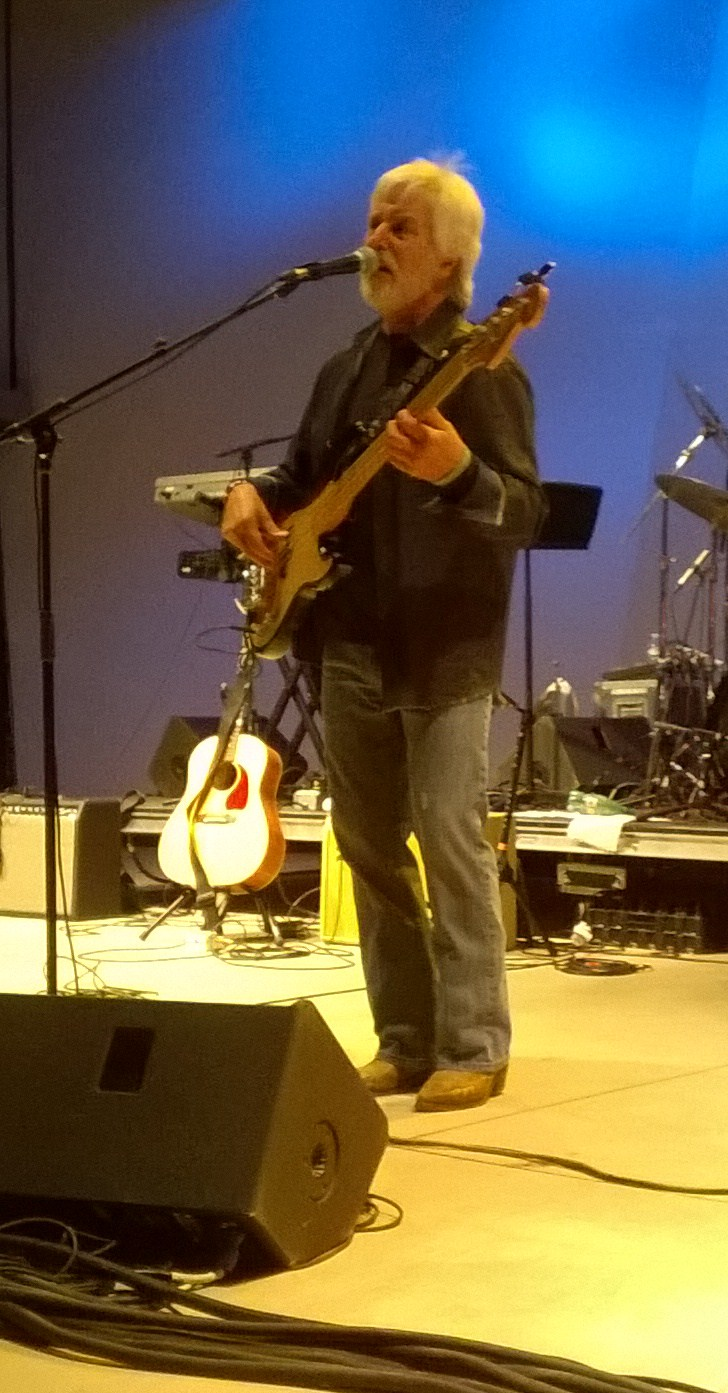
Bassist/vocalist Lance Hoppen

In 1990, Robbie Dupree approached them to make a live album for their growing fan base in Japan. Two shows at Woodstock's Bearsville Theater were recorded on October 6 and 7, 1990, as John, Larry, and Lance were joined by Bob Leinbach, Paul Branin (sax, guitar), and special guests Rob Leon, John Sebastian, Jonell Mosser, Artie Traum, Jim Curtin, and Lane Hoppen.

The double Orleans Live CD set, culled from the two Bearsville Theater shows, came out in Japan in February 1991, followed in April by their first trip to perform in Japan with a lineup of John, Larry, Lance, Leinbach, O'Brien, and Paul Branin.

In 1993, Orleans Live: Volume 1, a single-disc CD version, was released; it was the first release on the band's own Major Records label. Live Volume 2, featuring the rest of the show, was released later.

Still without a traditional label in the U.S., Orleans recorded a new album, Analog Men, for the Japanese label Pioneer. It came out there in 1994 and was followed by a return to Japan for more shows.

Later that year, Orleans played at Woodstock 94, which was practically in their backyard, in Saugerties, New York. Bob Leinbach once again rejoined the group for this show and continued to make occasional guest appearances with them throughout the 1990s.

The following year, they toured as an acoustic trio (John, Larry, and Lance). While most of the venues were small listening clubs, the real highlight of 1995 was being the opening act on the Can't Stop Rockin' tour with Fleetwood Mac, REO Speedwagon, and Pat Benatar.

Yet another new album, Ride, was recorded at John's Saugerties studio and released through an independent label, Dinosaur Entertainment, out of New Orleans. Ride emerged in the summer of 1996 and included just a couple of reworkings of the best and still unheard-in-the-US tunes from Analog Men. The single "I Am on Your Side" even began to make its way up the charts, but the label proved inexperienced and it folded shortly afterward, killing the song's chances for more radio play.

Orleans continued on, but in late 1997, decided to take another break. By this time, John was spending more time writing in Nashville.

=== 2000s ===
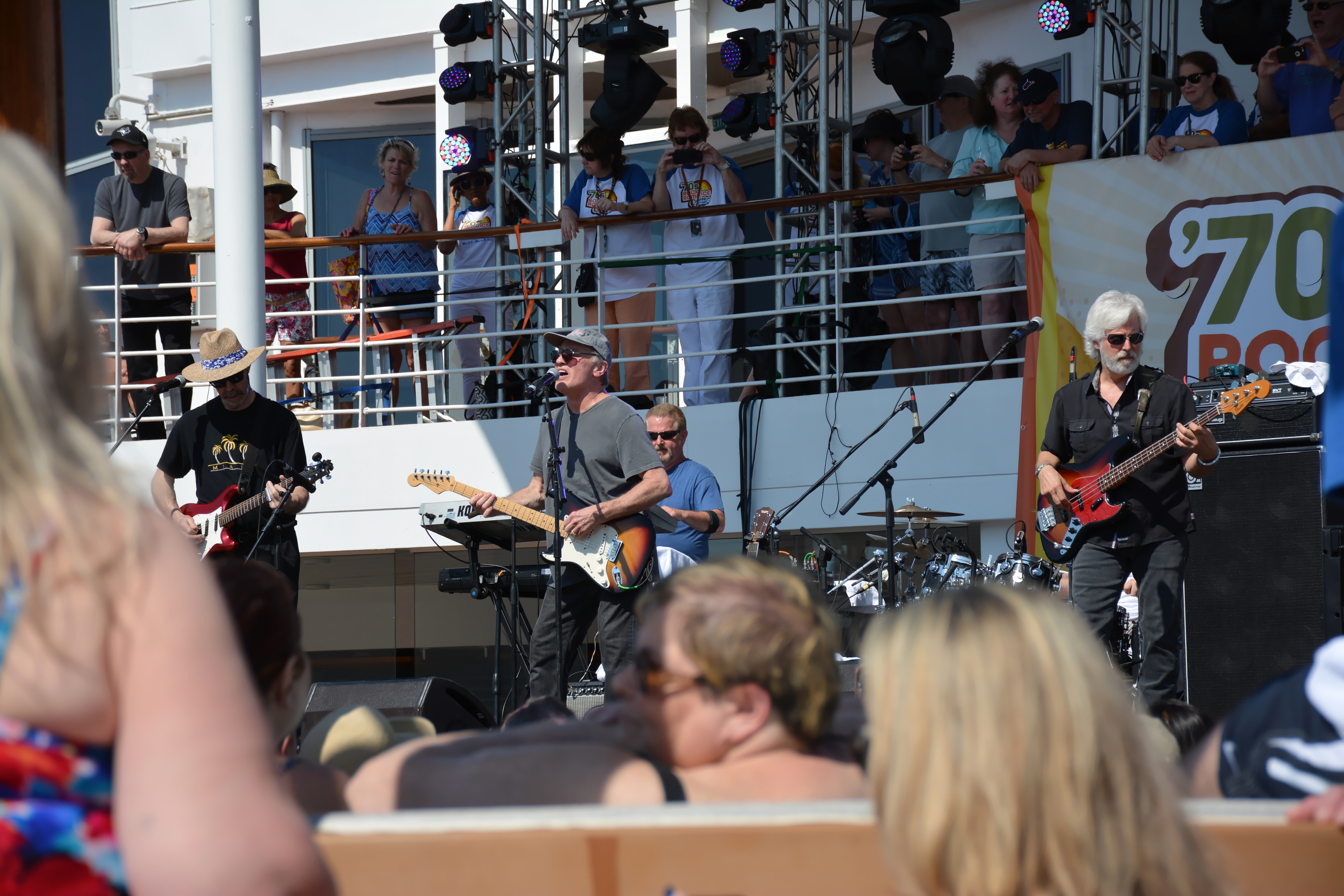
Orleans in March 2017

In the early 2000s, Lance was touring with various Nashville-based artists, and Larry, who had remarried and started a family, relocated to Florida in 2000 and formed his own Larry Hoppen Band. Since 1997, Larry had also been involved with Voices of Classic Rock, who in 2003 became known as RPM (Rock and Pop Masters) This was a "supergroup" of lead singers of popular 1970s and '80s groups (Toto, Survivor, Santana, Rainbow, etc.), backed by a single world-class touring band.

In the summer of 2001, nearly four years after their last gig, Orleans (John Hall, Larry, Lance, Peter O'Brien, and Bob Leinbach) reunited on Labor Day weekend to play the Opus 40 Amphitheatre in Saugerties. The band decided to remain together and continue performing. For some shows, the band included Peter and Bob. For others, Charlie Morgan (ex-Elton John) became the drummer and Lane Hoppen rejoined the band on keyboards in 2003. By 2005, Charlie and Lane had become permanent in their positions.

The band then picked up Jake Hooker, from Malibu, California, as their new manager.

Orleans continued to play live and record. A studio album, Dancin' in the Moonlight, was recorded in May and June 2004 at Charlie Morgan's Thynne Man Studios and first released in October 2005 on the CD Baby label. After that, the band's lineup was Larry, Lance and Lane Hoppen, Charlie Morgan, and "Fly" Amero (who replaced John Hall as he began his campaign for Congress in 2006) on guitar.

In 2007, Orleans released a live DVD/CD, We're Still Havin' Fun, recorded in August 2006 in Pittsfield, Massachusetts, which included both John Hall and "Fly" Amero, as well as the three Hoppen Brothers and drummer Charlie Morgan. Also appearing at this show were special guests, percussionist Manuel Quintana and Charles DeChant (from Hall & Oates) on sax.

During his 2006 bid for a U.S. Congressional seat, Hall appeared with the group on only a few occasions.

On November 7, 2006 Hall was elected as a Democrat to the United States House of Representatives from New York. He was re-elected in 2008. During the 2010 midterm elections, a political ad parody supporting John Hall's opponent, Nan Hayworth, promoted the fictitious organization "Young Voters for an Orleans Reunion Tour" as a means of voting Hall from Congress. Hayworth defeated Hall in the election. He had served four years (two terms) representing District 19 in the Hudson Valley, between New York City and Albany, New York.

Orleans continued to write, record, and perform. In 2010, they had repeat performances in both Washington, DC, (in support of the Democratic Congressional Campaign Committee), and in Saint Thomas, U.S. Virgin Islands (fundraising for the Nana Baby Home, the orphanage there).

=== 2010s ===
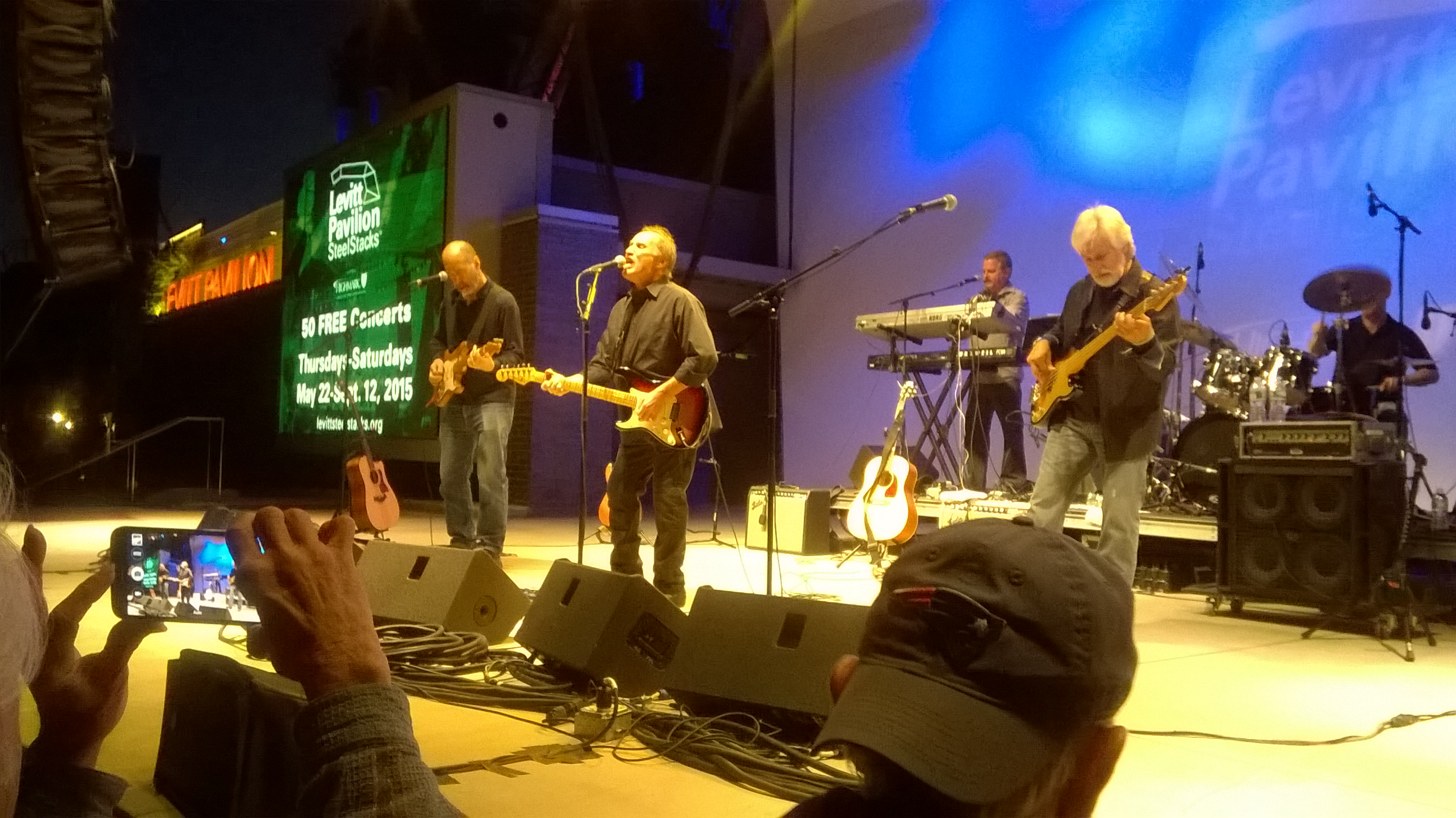
The group performing at Levitt SteelStacks in Bethlehem, Pennsylvania, on May 23, 2015

On July 24, 2012, founding band member Larry Hoppen died by suicide. Shows planned for the rest of the year were suddenly in jeopardy, but Lance quickly announced that although the band was in deep mourning for Larry, they had decided to finish the year's remaining dates (about eight) as best they could. At this point, John Hall returned to the live lineup and other alumni joined them on various shows. The first of those was 30 days later, in Deadwood, South Dakota, on August 24, 2012.

The group then played a free show at SteelStacks in Bethlehem, Pennsylvania, on September 2 in memoriam and continued on from there. On September 16, 2012, a memorial gathering of friends and family was held at the Bearsville Theater in Woodstock. Bob Leinbach, among the performers, sang "Forever", a song he had written with Larry about undying friendship.

Orleans carried on to November 11, 2012, with a lineup consisting of John Hall, "Fly" Amero, Charlie Morgan, and Lance and Lane Hoppen, ending the year with a memorial show at Mercy Lounge in Nashville, joined by many artist supporters, including Jimi Jamison, John Ford Coley, Henry Paul, Jonell Mosser, Kathie Baillie and Michael Bonagura, Pete Huttlinger, and Bill Lloyd. Again, it seemed to Lance that this would be the natural ending of Orleans' 40-year run, but that was not to be.

In the summer of 2013, supported by new manager Len Fico, the band appeared as part of the Sail Rock Tour, not only playing a set of their own hits, but also providing back-up for headliner Christopher Cross and contemporaries Firefall, Gary Wright, John Ford Coley, Robbie Dupree, Player, and Al Stewart. The Last Band Standing DVD was released in 2013, as well as the double-disc compilation CD, No More Than You Can Handle: A 40-Year Musical Journey, featuring several previously unreleased recordings, among them the title cut, which was the last in which Larry participated, as co-writer, singer, and player.

In the years following, Orleans continued to tour the US. Charlie Morgan departed in April 2018 and was replaced by drummer Brady Spencer.

In July 2019, John Hall announced his retirement from performing. Daniel "Chip" Martin, a Nashville musician friend of Lance and Brady's, then joined Orleans on guitar and vocals. John's "retirement" turned out to be a temporary sabbatical; in March 2020, he was just about to return to touring when everything came to a halt due to the COVID-19 pandemic.

=== 2020s ===
In 2020, the band released an in-isolation video performance of "No More Than You Can Handle" in memory of Larry Hoppen and as an aid for those who are struggling with the challenges of everyday life during the COVID-19 pandemic and quarantine.

During the summer of 2021, Orleans resumed in-person appearances, and in August of that year, vocalist/guitarist Tom Lane came to fill in for an ill "Fly" Amero, then ended up taking his place permanently.

The band released the Christmas album New Star Shining in September of 2021 that featured guest appearances by John Jorgenson, Bill Payne, Dan Dugmore, Andrea Zonn, and others.

In March 2022, the band toured as a quartet of Lance, Lane, Brady Spencer, and Tom Lane after John Hall retired from the road once again. Shortly afterwards, though, they were again a quintet when "Fly" Amero rejoined them.

Just before their appearance on a Rock'n'Romance Cruise in February 2023, Amero was once again forced to bow out. Nashville guitarist Michael Severs filled in for the cruise, then Lane's friend Tony Hooper joined as Fly's permanent replacement.

Currently, Lance is the only original member still active in the band.

== Members ==
Current

Bold denotes members of the "classic lineup".

- **Lance Hoppen** – bass, backing and lead vocals (1972–1989, 1990, 1991, 1994–1997, 2001–present)
- Lane Hoppen – keyboards, backing and lead vocals (1980–1984, 2003–present)
- Tony Hooper – vocals, guitar (2023–present)
- Brady Spencer – drums, backing vocals (2018–present)
- Tom Lane – vocals, guitar (2021–present)

Former

- **John Hall** – guitar, mandolin, keyboards, lead and backing vocals (1972–1977, 1985–1997, 2001–2006, 2012–2019, 2020–2022)
- **Larry Hoppen** – keyboards, guitar, bass, trumpet, melodica, lead and backing vocals (1972–1997, 2001–2012; his death)
- **Wells Kelly** – drums, keyboards, backing and lead vocals (1972–1981, died 1984)
- Jerry Marotta – drums (1976–1977, 1982)
- Bob Leinbach – keyboards, trombone, lead and backing vocals (1977–1980, 1985–1987, 1990, 1991, 1994, 2001–2003)
- Robert Martin – keyboards, sax, horns, backing vocals (1977–1980)
- Dennis "Fly" Amero – vocals, guitar (1980–1982, 2006–2021, 2022–2023)
- Charlie Shew – drums, backing vocals (1981–1982)
- Nicholas Parker – drums (1982–1984)
- Michael Mugrage – guitar, lead and backing vocals (1982–1984)
- Glen Worf – bass (1985–1987)
- Paul Cook – drums (1985–1986)
- Tommy Wells – drums (1986–1987)
- Peter O'Brien – drums (1988–1997, 2001–2003)
- Charlie Morgan – drums (2003–2018)
- Jim Curtin – bass, backing vocals (1989–1994)
- Paul Branin – saxophone, guitar (1990, 1991)
- Chip Martin – guitar, lead and backing vocals (2019–2020)

== Discography ==
=== Studio albums ===
Year	Album details	Chart peak positions			
Year	Album details	US	AUS	CAN	NED
1973	Orleans: Labels: ABC; Formats: CD, LP, CS, digital download	—	—	—	—
1974	Orleans II: Labels: ABC; Formats: CD, LP, CS, digital download	—	—	—	—
1975	Let There Be Music: Labels: Asylum; Formats: CD, LP, CS, digital download	33	—	71	—
1976	Waking and Dreaming: Labels: Asylum; Formats: CD, LP, CS, digital download	30	87	34	—
1979	Forever: Labels: MCA; Formats: CD, LP, CS, digital download	76	—	72	17
1980	Orleans: Labels: MCA; Formats: CD, LP, CS, digital download	—	—	—	—
1982	One of a Kind: Labels: Radio; Formats: CD, LP, CS, digital download	—	—	—	—
1986	Grown Up Children: Labels: MCA; Formats: CD, LP, CS, digital download	—	—	—	—
1994	Analog Men: Labels: Pioneer LDC; Formats: CD, LP, CS, digital download	—	—	—	—
1996	Ride: Labels: Dinosaur Entertainment; Formats: CD, LP, CS, digital download	—	—	—	—
2005	Dancin' in the Moonlight: Labels: Magnetic North; Formats: CD, LP, CS, digital download	—	—	—	—
2008	Obscurities: Labels: Magnetic North; Formats: CD, LP, CS, digital download	—	—	—	—
2021	New Star Shining: Labels: Sunset Blvd; Formats: CD, digital download	—	—	—	—

=== Live albums ===
- Live (1991)
- Live Volume 2 (1993)
- Still the One, Live (2002)
- We're Still Havin' Fun (2007)

=== Compilations ===
- The ABC Collection (1976)
- Before the Dance (1978)
- Love Takes Time (1986)
- Dance with Me – The Best of Orleans (1997)
- No More Than You Can Handle: A 40 Year Musical Journey (2013)
- Playlist: The Very Best of Orleans (2017)
- No More Than You Can Handle: A 46-Year Journey (2018)
- Love Takes Time: 10 Authorized Hits by Orleans (2019)
- Work at Home with Orleans (2020)

=== Charting singles ===
Year	Title	Peak chart positions						Certifications
Year	Title	US	US AC	US Country	CAN	AUS	NZ	Certifications
1975	"Let There Be Music"	55	—	—	96	—	—	
1975	"Dance with Me"	6	6	—	5	33	—	RIAA: Gold
1976	"Still the One"	5	33	—	9	61	31	RIAA: Gold
1977	"Reach"	51	47	—	31	—	—	
1977	"Spring Fever"	91	—	—	—	—	—	
1979	"Love Takes Time"	11	13	—	23	90	—	
1979	"Don't Throw Our Love Away"	—	—	—	—	—	—	
1979	"Forever"	—	24	—	—	—	—	
1982	"One of a Kind"	102	—	—	—	—	—	
1986	"You're Mine"	—	—	59	—	—	—	
"—" denotes a recording that did not chart or was not released in that territory.
