= Dance with Me (Orleans song) =

1975 single by Orleans

- One of side-A labels of the US single

Single by Orleans

from the album Orleans II and Let There Be Music
- B-side: "Ending of a Song"
- Released: July 1975
- Recorded: 1974
- Genre: Pop rock; soft rock
- Length: 2:59 (single version); 3:19 (album version)
- Label: Asylum
- Songwriters: John Hall, Johanna Hall
- Producer: Chuck Plotkin

Orleans singles chronology
"Let There Be Music" (1975)	"Dance with Me" (1975)	"Still the One" (1976)

Official audio
- "Dance with Me" on YouTube

"Dance with Me" is a 1975 hit single by American soft rock band Orleans from their second studio album, Orleans II (1974).

Featuring a melodica solo by Larry Hoppen, "Dance with Me" was introduced on the band's second album, Orleans II, and later included on their third album Let There Be Music (1975). The song was issued as a single on July 19, 1975, to become Orleans' first Top 40 hit, peaking at No. 6 on the Billboard Hot 100 the week of October 18, 1975.

== Composition ==
The song was written by group member John Hall and journalist-turned-lyricist Johanna Hall (then a married couple). According to Johanna, John wrote the melody first; Johanna suggested "Dance with Me" as the title after she first heard it, but John rejected the idea as too simple. The couple were out driving one day when Johanna, struck by inspiration, blurted out the lyrics: "Pick the beat up and kick your feet up", and John was won over to the idea of her writing the song's lyric for the title "Dance With Me".

Of the song's acoustic-based conclusion, Larry Hoppen later said in an interview that "it's always been a fun ending."

== Reception ==
Billboard described "Dance with Me" as having a "sweet summer sound" resulting from "soft vocal harmonies" and the acoustic instrumentation. Billboard also described the hook as being "infectious." Record World said that it "could be for the Let There Be Music men what "Best of My Love" was to Eagles" and that this "mellow invitation should receive positive, multi-format responses."

== Chart performance ==
=== Weekly charts ===
Chart (1975)	Peak position
Australia (Kent Music Report)	33
Canada RPM Top Singles	5
Canada RPM Adult Contemporary	6
U.S. Billboard Hot 100	6
U.S. Billboard Easy Listening	6
U.S. Cash Box Top 100	5

=== Year-end charts ===
Chart (1975)	Rank
Canada	64
U.S. Billboard Hot 100	70
U.S. Cash Box	37
