= Still the One =

1976 single by Orleans

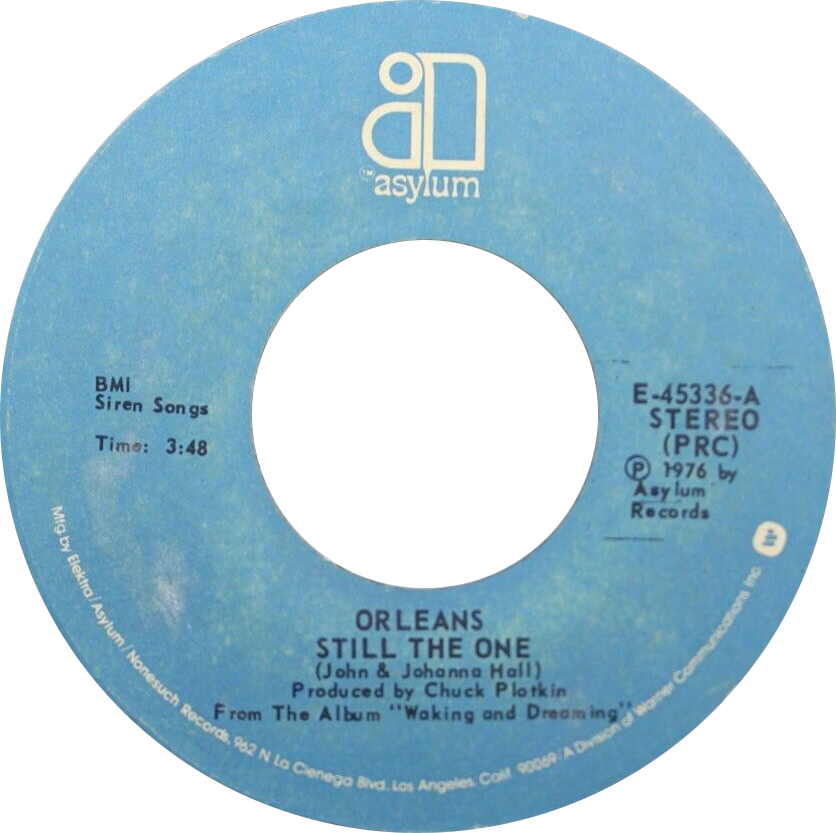
- One of side-A labels of the US single

Single by Orleans

from the album Waking and Dreaming
- B-side: "Siam Sam"
- Released: August 1976
- Recorded: 1975
- Studio: Sound Factory (Hollywood)
- Genre: Soft rock; pop rock
- Length: 3:54
- Label: Asylum
- Songwriters: Johanna Hall, John Hall
- Producer: Chuck Plotkin

Orleans singles chronology
"Dance with Me" (1975)	"Still the One" (1976)	"Reach" (1977)

Audio
- "Still the One" on YouTube

"Still the One" is a song written by Johanna Hall and John Hall, and recorded by the soft rock group Orleans on their album Waking and Dreaming, released in 1976; it reached No. 5 on the Billboard Hot 100.

Country singer Bill Anderson recorded and released a successful cover version, peaking at No. 11 on Billboard's Hot Country Singles chart in 1977.

== Background ==
Orleans bass player Lance Hoppen recalls that Johanna Hall wrote the lyrics for "Still the One" after a friend "asked her why somebody couldn't write a song about staying together, as opposed to breaking up"; Johanna Hall wrote the lyrics on an envelope which she then handed to John Hall who Hoppen says "created the music in about fifteen minutes". Johanna Hall's recollection is that the realization that there was a dearth of songs about long-term relationships came to her while she was doing laundry, and that she handed John Hall a napkin on which she'd written the song's lyric. John Hall would recall that "Still the One" was not an automatic choice for lead single from Waking and Dreaming, saying that "we had several songs that were candidates. We were too close to it to see. Fortunately, our producer, Chuck Plotkin, had a strong feeling about the song."

Record World said that it was a "suitable follow-up to 'Dance with Me'" and that "chiming guitars and confident harmony work are the ingredients to make it happen."

The B-side was a non-album track called "Siam Sam" that was sung by Wells Kelly and composed by both Kelly and songwriter/instrumentalist Chris Myers.

== Personnel ==
- John Hall – electric guitar, backing vocals
- Larry Hoppen – electric piano, lead vocals, electric guitar
- Lance Hoppen – bass
- Jerry Marotta – drums
- Wells Kelly – backing vocals, tambourine

== In popular culture ==
In 1977, "Still The One" was used as a jingle by the American Broadcasting Company (ABC) to promote the 1977-78 television season, and again in the 1979-80 television season, when the network was the highest rated in the country. A lot of ABC News affiliates used it to promote strong ratings. The lyrics were sometimes adapted for local station promotional advertisements, sometimes awkwardly; e.g. "We're still having fun, Dayton Twenty-Two's the one." ABC made two more versions of the song in 1995 and 2002. It was used in commercials for Burger King in 1996 and 1997.

The song was also used in adverts and promotions for the Nine Network of Australia from the late 1970s to the mid-2000s and, even though the song only reached No. 61 in Australia in its original chart run, it is most remembered for its use by the Nine Network. It was also used at EM TV in Papua New Guinea in the 1980s (at the time owned by the Nine Network), and by Sky Television in the United Kingdom.

In 2004, the Bush campaign played the song at campaign events until Orleans co-founder (and future Democratic congressman and Bush critic) John Hall commented publicly that the campaign had never received permission to use the song. The campaign later dropped the song from its playlist. Hall expressed similar criticisms when John McCain used the song in his 2008 presidential campaign. A version of the song's chorus was sung at the 2008 Democratic National Convention, following the conclusion of Senator Ted Kennedy's speech.

== Charts ==
=== Weekly charts ===
Chart (1976)	Peak position
Australia (KMR)	61
Canada RPM Top Singles	9
Canada RPM Adult Contemporary	43
New Zealand (RIANZ)	31
U.S. Billboard Hot 100	5
U.S. Cash Box Top 100	6
U.S. Billboard Easy Listening	33

=== Year-end charts ===
Chart (1976)	Rank
Canada	100
U.S. Billboard Hot 100	82
U.S. Cash Box Top 100	76

== Bill Anderson version ==
"Still the One"
- Side A of the US retail single

Single by Bill Anderson

from the album Scorpio
- B-side: "This Ole Suitcase"
- Released: March 1977
- Recorded: December 13, 1976
- Genre: Country; countrypolitan
- Length: 3:20
- Label: MCA
- Producer: Buddy Killen

Bill Anderson singles chronology
"Where Are You Going, Billy Boy" (1977)	"Still the One" (1977)	"I Can't Wait Any Longer" (1978)

"Still the One" was notably recorded by American country singer-songwriter Bill Anderson. It was released as a single in 1977 via MCA Records and became a major hit the following year.

Anderson's version was recorded on December 13, 1976 in Nashville, Tennessee. The session was produced by Buddy Killen, who recently became Anderson's producer after many years of working with Owen Bradley. Killen would continue producing Anderson until his departure from MCA Records. "Still the One" was the only song recorded during this particular session.

"Still the One" was released as a single by MCA Records in October 1977. The song spent 12 weeks on the Billboard Hot Country Singles before reaching number 11 in June 1977. The song was among Anderson's final major hits as a recording artist. His final top ten hit would be released in 1978, followed by his final top 20 release in 1979. In Canada, the single also reached the top 20, reaching number 13 on the RPM Country Songs chart in 1977. It was Anderson's second single that was a cover version of an original recording. His first was 1969's "But You Know I Love You", which reached the country top 10. It was first released on his 1977 studio album Scorpio, which also included the major hit "Head to Toe".

7" vinyl single

- "Still the One" – 3:20
- "This Ole Suitcase" – 4:14

=== Chart performance ===
Chart (1977)	Peak position
Canada Country Songs (RPM)	13
US Hot Country Songs (Billboard)	11
