= John Hall (New York politician) =

American politician and musician (born 1948)

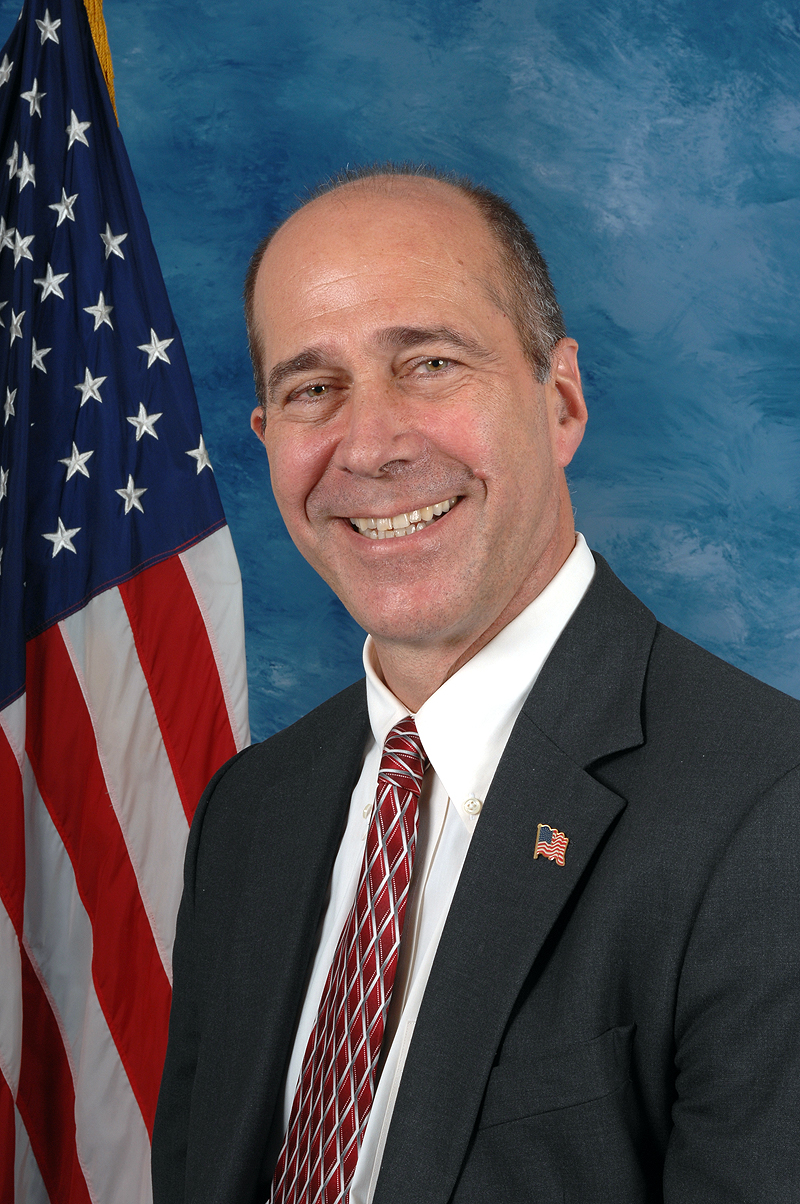

Member of the U.S. House of Representatives from New York's 19th district
- In office January 3, 2007 – January 3, 2011
- Preceded by: Sue Kelly
- Succeeded by: Nan Hayworth

Personal details
- Born: John Joseph Hall; July 23, 1948 (age 77) Baltimore, Maryland, U.S.
- Party: Democratic
- Spouses: Johanna Hall (m. 1971; div. 1985); Pamela Bingham (m. 2001; div. 2021); Andrea Zonn (m. 2022)
- Education: University of Notre Dame; Loyola University Maryland

John Joseph Hall (born July 23, 1948) is an American musician, songwriter, politician, environmentalist, and community activist. He was elected to the legislature of Ulster County, New York, in 1989 and the Saugerties, New York Board of Education in 1991, and he was the U.S. representative for New York's 19th congressional district, serving from 2007 to 2011. He is a member of the Democratic Party. Hall also founded the rock band Orleans in 1972 and continued to perform with them up until 2022.

== Early life and musical career ==
Hall was born in Baltimore, Maryland, and grew up in Elmira, New York. He is the son of James A. Hall, who was a PhD in electrical engineering and Marie W. Hall, who had M.A. in divinity. A three-time National Science Foundation summer scholar, he skipped two grades in school and left Notre Dame High School in Elmira at age sixteen to study physics at the University of Notre Dame, and then English at Loyola College, Baltimore.

Hall began playing piano at age 4, and later studied French horn in school and taught himself guitar and bass. After changing his concentration to creative writing and performing in numerous musical ensembles, Hall quit college to begin his professional musical career in the clubs in the Georgetown section of Washington, D.C., and then in Greenwich Village in New York City. In 1967, his group Kangaroo released an album on MGM Records, and Hall also composed music for a Broadway theatre trilogy Morning, Noon and Night. He released his debut solo album, Action in 1970. Since then he has released 7 albums solo or as the John Hall Band.

In late January 1972, he founded Orleans in Ulster County, New York, with Wells Kelly and Larry Hoppen. Lance Hoppen, Larry's brother, joined the band later in that year, completing the Orleans lineup that would last throughout the band's most successful period. Orleans released two albums on ABC Records, and two on David Geffen's Asylum Records, the latter two including the top five hits "Dance With Me" and "Still The One" which are each certified by BMI at more than 7 million airplays in the United States. As part of Orleans, he was a songwriter and session musician for artists that include Janis Joplin, Seals and Crofts, Taj Mahal, Jackson Browne, Little Feat, and Bonnie Raitt.

In 1977, Hall left to concentrate on the solo career that had begun with the Action album at the beginning of the decade and became active in the anti-nuclear movement, fighting to stop a nuclear plant planned for Cementon on the Hudson River, and co-founding Musicians United for Safe Energy with Jackson Browne, Bonnie Raitt, and Graham Nash. His second solo recording of that period (his third overall) included the title track "Power," which became an environmental anthem performed by Pete Seeger; Peter, Paul and Mary; Holly Near; and the Doobie Brothers and James Taylor, who cut it live at the No Nukes Concerts at Madison Square Garden. In 1981 he formed the John Hall Band, which consisted of Hall, keyboardist and vocalist Bob Leinbach, bassist and vocalist John Troy, and drummer Eric Parker. The John Hall Band released two albums on the EMI America label with high AOR and MTV visibility but limited Top 40 success. "Crazy (Keep On Falling)," from the album All of the Above, was the band's only major hit (U.S. #42).

While living in Saugerties, Hall co-founded two citizens' groups — Saugerties Concerned Citizens and the Winston Farm Alliance. The former worked to close down illegal junkyards operating in the town, and the latter successfully opposed the siting of a giant dump and incinerator on the historic Winston Farm, named after the engineer James Winston, who designed New York City's system of reservoirs and aqueducts. Hall also served one term in the Ulster County Legislature, and was elected twice to the Saugerties Board of Education, where his fellow trustees elected him president.

Hall spent decades writing songs for other artists and reunited with Orleans in 1985, rejoining them intermittently up through 2006. After his divorce from Johanna, he moved to Hunter, New York, and later to Nashville. There he wrote more songs including co-writing Steve Wariner's #1 country hit "You Can Dream of Me," began touring with Jonell Mosser and Freebo, and continued sporadically performing with Orleans. In 2005, he released Rock Me on the Water, an album of songs inspired by an extensive sailing trip he took with his second wife Pamela Bingham from Kingston, New York, to Key West, and Havana, Cuba on a humanitarian aid delivery mission, and later Martha's Vineyard; Cuttyhunk; and Annapolis, Maryland. He also formed the band Gulf Stream Night with longtime Orleans drummer Peter O'Brien, percussionist Joakim Lartey, bassist Bobby MacDougal, and his wife Pamela, who co-wrote four of the songs on the CD, on vocals and guitar. Having sold the boat and moved back to the Hudson Valley of New York, this time to Dutchess County, the Halls began to settle in and make new friends in Dover and Millbrook, where "Gulf Stream Night" was recorded.

Orleans released a new CD in 2005, Dancin' in the Moonlight, containing many of Hall's writing collaborations, guitar parts, and vocals, as well as two songs co-written by John and Pamela Melanie Hall.

Hall put his musical career on hold during his time in office, but performed at the concert honoring the 90th birthday of Pete Seeger, supporting the Hudson River Sloop Clearwater at Madison Square Garden on May 3, 2009. He joined other performers in the singing of "Oh Mary Don't You Weep" and later joined the entire cast for an encore, singing "Good Night, Irene". In August 2011, Hall joined his MUSE cohorts Bonnie Raitt, Jackson Browne, and Crosby, Stills & Nash along with Jason Mraz, the Doobie Brothers, and Tom Morello for a benefit concert in Mountain View, California, proceeds to aid victims of the tsunami and nuclear meltdowns in Fukushima, Japan, and to promote renewable energy. John and Pamela Hall, along with co-lyricist Bob Furlong, wrote the song "I Told You So" and performed it with Browne, Raitt, and Nash at the concert. In 2012, following the death of Larry Hoppen, Hall rejoined the band Orleans and has been recording and performing with them since.

== Political career ==
He has been involved with Mid-Hudson Nuclear Opponents, who successfully fought the siting of a nuclear power plant on the Hudson River in Greene County. While living in Saugerties, New York, Hall co-founded Saugerties Concerned Citizens, and helped write the town's first zoning law. When Ulster County announced plans for a 200-acre (0.81 km^{2}) solid waste dump on the historic Winston farm, Hall led the opposition. This effort culminated in his 1989 election to the Ulster County Legislature. In the late 1990s, after three successive school budgets were rejected by the voters, John ran for, and was elected twice to, the Saugerties Board of Education. His fellow trustees elected him president, and budgets were passed each year of Hall's tenure.

In late October 2004, Hall publicly commented that the presidential campaign of George W. Bush had not asked for permission to use the Orleans song "Still the One" at campaign events. His publisher sent a cease and desist letter to the campaign which dropped the song from their playlist. Four years later, Hall expressed similar disapproval when John McCain's presidential campaign also used the song without asking for permission. The song would eventually be used at the 2008 Democratic National Convention following the conclusion of Senator Ted Kennedy’s speech.

=== Tenure in Congress ===
During the fall of 2005, Hall's concern about the environment and the Iraq War, and dissatisfaction with Sue Kelly, the U.S. Representative for his new home town, contributed to his decision to set musical projects aside and run for the seat in New York's 19th congressional district. He defeated several other Democratic candidates in the primary and Kelly in the general election. In the House of Representatives, Hall served on the Select Committee on Energy Independence and Global Warming, the Committee on Transportation and Infrastructure, and the House Veterans Affairs Committee. He was appointed to be chairman of the Subcommittee on Disability Assistance and Memorial Affairs. He was one of three freshmen representatives assigned a subcommittee chairmanship. As chair of the VA Disability and Memorial Affairs subcommittee, he helped write the Veterans Claims Modernization Act of 2008, which passed the House and Senate unanimously and was signed into law by President George W. Bush, who referred to it as "good government". Hall was assigned to serve on the Committee on Transportation and Infrastructure and was chairman of the Subcommittee on Disability Assistance and Memorial Affairs of the Veterans Affairs Committee in the 110th Congress.

Hall was reelected in 2008 over Republican candidate Kieran Lalor, but he lost in the 2010 election to Nan Hayworth. In July 2011, Hall announced that he would not seek a rematch with Hayworth, citing the prohibitive campaign fund-raising necessary as a result of the Supreme Court's decision in Citizens United v. FEC. He said he wanted to spend time with his family and travel across the country with his band. Hayworth served one term before losing reelection in 2012.

=== Policy positions ===
Despite representing a historically Republican area, Hall has described himself as a progressive Democrat. He was a member of the Congressional Progressive Caucus. In the beginning of the 110th Congress, Hall voted to raise minimum wage and federal funding of embryonic stem cell research.

Prior to the election, Hall expressed interest in drug policy reform, noting that many of his best friends and mentors in the music industry partake in recreational drug use without adverse effects. At SUNY New Paltz, during a March 11, 2006, audio interview, he said that drug prohibition had "failed" and that he agreed with Maurice Hinchey on the need for reform on Plan Colombia, medical marijuana, and a provision of the Higher Education Act that denies financial aid to students with drug offenses. However, in July 2007, John Hall voted against an amendment by Hinchey that would end the raid of medical marijuana patients.

Hall voted for the Healthcare Reform Bill that passed in the House on November 7, 2009, as well as the Senate bill on March 21, 2010. He opposed the Stupak Amendment which proposed to restrict the use of federal funds for abortion funding. He was also a critic of BP's handling of the Deepwater Horizon oil spill in the Gulf of Mexico.

=== Campaigns ===
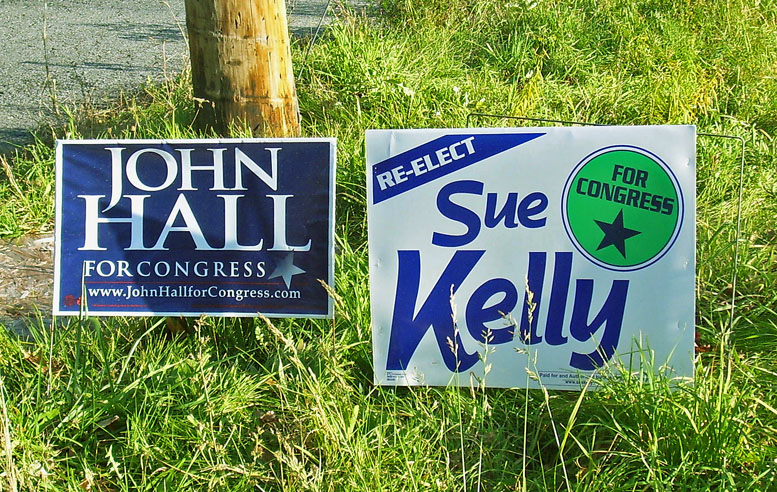
Signs for Hall and Sue Kelly during the competitive 2006 election

==== 2006 ====
Hall ran for Congress in the 19th District in the September 2006 primary race as a Democrat in New York's 19th congressional district. He won the primary, with a commanding 48% in a 4-way race, and faced incumbent Sue W. Kelly in the November election. Hall defeated Kelly with 51% of the vote, losing to Kelly in Putnam, Dutchess, and Rockland counties, but carrying the incumbent's home county of Westchester, as well as Orange, to pull off the upset.

According to an article in the Hudson Valley newspaper, the Middletown Times Herald-Record, two days after his primary victory, Hall, in an online chat with the progressive blog Firedoglake, was asked about his position on a possible impeachment of then-President George W. Bush. Hall stopped short of endorsing impeachment "before hearing evidence", but added that "Whether impeachment or censure, some action must be taken to circumscribe the powers of the presidency". When pressed on the issue, "he candidly reminded the probing blogger, 'I'm trying to get elected in an historically Republican district.'"

Hall was interviewed by Comedy Central-based satirist Stephen Colbert on October 19, 2006, for a "Better Know a District" segment of his popular comedy show, The Colbert Report. Stephen Colbert said that he opposes everything that John Hall stands for, but Hall was willing to talk to him; Sue Kelly turned down the opportunity to be interviewed so John Hall picked a "Smear Card" which said "My opponent smokes marijuana". Colbert replied by saying "That's a bold accusation, that someone in the press should investigate or at least look up on because it's out there now; it's out there now that Sue Kelly smokes pot. DEA, check out her house. Look for grow lights. I'm not saying it. He is". As the centerpiece of the interview, Colbert eventually convinced Hall to harmonize with him on the Orleans song "Dance with Me". He made a brief encore appearance on The Colbert Report the day after his election, November 8, joining Colbert in a harmonized rendition of The Star-Spangled Banner.

==== 2008 ====
Although the 19th is a historically Republican district, Republicans had trouble recruiting a strong challenger to Hall. Several potential top-tier candidates, such as State Assemblyman Greg Ball, Orange County Executive Ed Diana, and former White House Press Secretary Ari Fleischer all declined to run for the seat. Andrew Saul, head of the Federal Thrift Retirement Investment Board had begun raising funds for a campaign but announced on November 20, 2007, that he would not run. In February 2008, however, Saul was rumored to be considering entering the race once again and had launched online polls to gauge interest.

Hall drew numerous potential challengers for the 2008 race, including Iraq veteran Kieran Lalor and Westchester County Legislator George Oros. Other potential challengers included Sue Kelly, ex-Congressman Joseph J. DioGuardi, ex-State Superintendent of Insurance Howard Mills, ex-NYC Finance Commissioner and State Tax Commissioner Andrew Eristoff, Emily Pataki, the daughter of former Governor George Pataki, and ex-Pataki campaign manager Michael Finnegan. Having received the endorsement of the Republican committees in all five counties in the district, Lalor was the only remaining Republican challenger.

On November 4, 2008, Hall was re-elected to serve the 19th district of New York in the 111th session of the United States Congress. He defeated Republican newcomer Kieran Lalor, taking 59% of the vote. In January 2009, Hall declared his support for Kirsten Gillibrand becoming the junior senator of New York, a seat vacated by Secretary of State Hillary Clinton.

==== 2010 ====
Facing a tough re-election, Hall lost to Republican nominee Nan Hayworth in the 2010 election.

== Electoral history ==
U.S. House election, 2006: New York District 19
Party	Candidate	Votes	%	±%
Democratic	John Hall	100,119	51.2	+17.9
Republican	Sue W. Kelly (incumbent)	95,359	48.8	−17.9
Majority		4,760	2.4	−31.1
Turnout		195,478		−25.6

U.S. House election, 2008: New York District 19
Party	Candidate	Votes	%	±%
Democratic	John Hall (incumbent)	164,859	58.7	+7.5
Republican	Kieran Lalor	116,120	41.3	−7.5
Majority		48,739	17.3	14.9
Turnout		280,979		43.7

U.S. House election, 2010: New York District 19
Party	Candidate	Votes	%	±%
Republican	Nan Hayworth	109,956	52.5	+11.2
Democratic	John Hall (incumbent)	98,766	47.5	−11.2
Majority		11,190	5.3	−12
Turnout		209,285		−25.5

== Personal life ==
Hall married his first wife, writer Johanna Hall, who he met while playing at Cafe Wha in Greenwich Village, in 1971. They lived in Woodstock then Saugerties, New York, and have one daughter, Lillian Sofi Hall. Johanna Hall was the co-author, with Hall, of such songs as "Dance with Me" and "Still the One". In 2001, Hall married his second wife, Pamela Bingham Hall, a guitarist and attorney who has also co-written songs with Hall. They divorced in 2021 and Hall married singer and fiddler Andrea Zonn in April 2022. They live in Nashville TN.

== Discography ==
=== Studio albums ===
Year	Album details	Chart peak positions
Year	Album details	U.S.
1970	Action: Labels: Columbia; Formats: CD, LP, CS, digital download	-
1978	John Hall: Labels: Asylum; Formats: CD, LP, CS, digital download	-
1979	Power: Labels: Columbia; Formats: CD, LP, CS, digital download	-
1981	All Of The Above: Labels: EMI America; Formats: CD, LP, CS, digital download	158
1983	Searchparty: Labels: EMI America; Formats: CD, LP, CS, digital download	147
1992	On A Distant Star: Labels: Pioneer LDC; Formats: CD, LP, CS, digital download	-
1998	Recovered: Labels: Siren Songs; Formats: CD, LP, CS, digital download	-
1999	Love Doesn't Ask: Labels: Siren Songs; Formats: CD, LP, CS, digital download	-
2005	Rock Me On The Water: Labels: Siren Songs; Formats: CD, LP, CS, digital download	-
2021	Reclaiming My Time: Labels: Sunset Blvd; Formats: CD, digital download	-

U.S. House of Representatives
Preceded by Sue Kelly	Member of the U.S. House of Representatives from New York's 19th congressional district 2007–2011	Succeeded by Nan Hayworth
U.S. order of precedence (ceremonial)
Preceded by Randy Kuhl as Former U.S. Representative	Order of precedence of the United States as Former U.S. Representative	Succeeded by Dan Maffei as Former U.S. Representative
