= Jean Shepard discography =

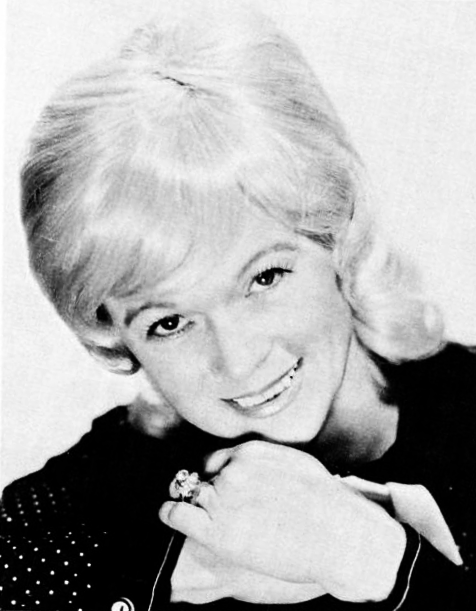
- Jean Shepard, circa 1972
- Studio albums: 29
- Live albums: 2
- Compilation albums: 12
- Box set albums: 1
- Lead and collaborative singles: 72
- Promotional singles: 4
- Other charted songs: 2
- Album appearances: 9

The discography of American country singer Jean Shepard contains 29 studio albums, 12 compilation albums, two live albums, 1 box set album, 72 lead and collaborative singles, four promotional singles, two other charted songs and nine album appearances. Her first singles were released by Capitol Records in 1953, beginning with "Crying Steel Guitar Waltz". Her next two releases featured vocals by Shepard and a recitation by Ferlin Husky. The first was "A Dear John Letter", Shepard's only number one single on the US Hot Country Songs chart. It also reached number four on the US pop chart and number three in Australia. The second was "Forgive Me, John", which reached the US country top five, the US pop top 30 and the Australia top 20. In 1955, her solo singles "A Satisfied Mind" and "Beautiful Lies" both reached number four on the US Hot Country Songs chart. Their B-sides also charted on the US country chart: "Take Possession" and "I Thought of You". The latter peaked in the US country top ten.

In May 1956, Capitol released Shepard's debut studio album Songs of a Love Affair. It was followed by Lonesome Love (1958), Got You on My Mind (1961) and Heartaches and Tears (1962). Her 1964 studio album Lighthearted and Blue was her first to make the US Top Country Albums chart, peaking at number 17. The same year, Shepard's solo single "Second Fiddle (To an Old Guitar)" became a top five on the US Hot Country Songs chart. Seven more of Shepard's singles between 1966 and 1969 made the US country top ten and 20: "Many Happy Hangovers to You" (1966), "If Teardrops Were Silver" (1966), "I'll Take the Dog" (1966), "Heart, We Did All That We Could" (1967), "Your Forevers (Don't Last Very Long)" (1967) and "Seven Lonely Days" (1969). Her singles were released on corresponding studio LP's with identical titles. Of her LP's, Many Happy Hangovers (1966) and Heart, We Did All That We Could (1967) were the highest-peaking the US Top Country Albums list, reaching number six respectively.

After 1970's top ten single "Then He Touched Me", Shepard's singles and albums reached progressively lower chart positions. Then, in 1973, the single "Slippin' Away" made the US and Canadian country song top five. It also made the top 100 of the US pop chart. Between 1973 and 1975, four of her singles made the US or Canadian country top 20: "At the Time" (1974), "I'll Do Anything It Takes (To Stay with You)" (1974), "Poor Sweet Baby" (1975) and "The Tip of My Fingers" (1975). During this period, United Artists Records released five studio LP's of Shepard's material. Her highest-peaking on the US country chart was 1973's Slippin' Away, which reached number 15. Shepard sporadically released more studio albums such as Stars of the Grand Ole Opry (1981), Slippin' Away (1991) and The Tennessee Waltz (2000).

== Albums ==
=== Studio albums ===
List of studio albums, with selected chart positions, and other relevant details
Title	Album details	Peak chart positions
Title	Album details	US Country
Songs of a Love Affair	Released: May 1956; Label: Capitol; Formats: LP	—
Lonesome Love	Released: December 1958; Label: Capitol; Formats: LP	—
Got You on My Mind	Released: March 1961; Label: Capitol; Formats: LP	—
Heartaches and Tears	Released: January 1962; Label: Capitol; Formats: LP	—
Lighthearted and Blue	Released: October 1964; Label: Capitol; Formats: LP	17
It's a Man Every Time	Released: October 1965; Label: Capitol; Formats: LP	19
Many Happy Hangovers	Released: July 1966; Label: Capitol; Formats: LP	6
I'll Take the Dog (with Ray Pillow)	Released: November 1966; Label: Capitol; Formats: LP	19
Heart, We Did All That We Could	Released: March 1967; Label: Capitol; Formats: LP	6
Your Forevers Don't Last Very Long	Released: September 1967; Label: Capitol; Formats: LP	19
Heart to Heart	Released: February 1968; Label: Capitol; Formats: LP	43
A Real Good Woman	Released: October 1968; Label: Capitol; Formats: LP	32
I'll Fly Away	Released: February 1969; Label: Capitol; Formats: LP	—
Seven Lonely Days	Released: September 1969; Label: Capitol; Formats: LP	42
Best by Request (re-recordings)	Released: March 1970; Label: Capitol; Formats: LP	23
A Woman's Hand	Released: September 1970; Label: Capitol; Forma LP	—
Here & Now	Released: March 1971; Label: Capitol; Formats: LP	—
Just as Soon as I Get Over Loving You	Released: September 1971; Label: Capitol; Formats: LP	—
Just Like Walkin' in the Sunshine	Released: September 1972; Label: Capitol; Formats: LP	—
Slippin' Away	Released: September 1973; Label: United Artists; Formats: LP	15
I'll Do Anything It Takes	Released: July 1974; Label: United Artists; Formats: LP	21
Poor Sweet Baby...And Ten More Bill Anderson Songs	Released: March 1975; Label: United Artists; Formats: LP	42
I'm a Believer	Released: November 1975; Label: United Artists; Formats: LP	—
Mercy, Ain't Love Good	Released: August 1976; Label: United Artists; Formats: LP	37
Stars of the Grand Ole Opry	Released: May 1981; Label: First Generation; Formats: LP	—
Together at Last (with Roy Drusky)	Released: 1985; Label: Round Robin; Formats: Cassette	—
Slippin' Away (re-recordings)	Released: 1991; Label: Country Harvest; Formats: Cassette	—
The Tennessee Waltz	Released: 2000; Label: Ernest Tubb Record Shop; Formats: Cassette	—
Precious Memories	Released: circa 2000; Label: Raney; Formats: CD	—
"—" denotes a recording that did not chart or was not released in that territory.

=== Compilation albums ===
List of compilations albums, showing all relevant details
Title	Album details
This Is Jean Shepard	Released: September 1959; Label: Capitol; Formats: LP
The Best of Jean Shepard	Released: September 1963; Label: Capitol; Formats: LP
Hello Old Broken Heart	Released: 1967; Label: Hilltop/Pickwick; Formats: LP
Under Your Spell Again	Released: 1968; Label: Hilltop; Formats: LP
For the Good Times	Released: 1975; Label: Capitol; Formats: LP
Jean Shepard's Greatest Hits	Released: December 1976; Label: United Artists; Formats: LP
The Very Best of Jean Shepard	Released: 1979; Label: United Artists; Formats: LP
The Best of Jean Shepard	Released: 1979; Label: Capitol; Formats: LP
Honky Tonk Heroine: The Classic Capitol Recordings, 1952–1964	Released: 1995; Label: Country Music Foundation; Formats: Cassette, CD
Jean (Note: Jean contained 11 tracks, two of which were new recordings, produced by Gregg Hutchins: "I'm Not That Good at Goodbyes" and "Head Over Heels in Love with You".)	Released: circa 2000; Label: Raney; Formats: CD
Down Through the Years (Note: Down Through the Years contained 20 tracks, one of which was a new recording titled "Whoever Finds This".)	Released: 2007; Label: Raney; Formats: CD
Greatest Hits – All Original Recordings	Released: 2011; Label: Capitol Nashville; Formats: Digital
"—" denotes a recording that did not chart or was not released in that territory.

=== Live albums ===
List of live albums, showing all relevant details
Title	Album details
On the Road (as Jean Shepard and the Second Fiddles)	Released: 1974; Label: Jewel; Formats: LP
Live at Good Time Country (with special guest Emily Reynolds)	Released: 1975; Label: Birchfield; Formats: LP

=== Box sets ===
List of box set albums, showing all relevant details
Title	Album details
The Melody Ranch Girl	Released: 1995; Formats: Bear Family; Formats: CD

== Singles ==
=== As lead and collaborative artist ===
List of solo and collaborative singles, with selected chart positions, showing other relevant details
Title	Year	Peak chart positions				Album
Title	Year	US	US Cou.	AUS	CAN Cou.	Album
"Crying Steel Guitar Waltz" (with Speedy West)	1953	—	—	—	—	—N/a
"A Dear John Letter" (recitation by Ferlin Husky)	1953	4	1	3	—	—N/a
"Forgive Me, John" (recitation by Ferlin Husky)	1953	24	4	16	—	—N/a
"Let's Kiss and Try Again" (with Ferlin Husky)	1954	—	—	—	—	—N/a
"Two Whoops and a Holler"	1954	—	—	—	—	—N/a
"Don't Fall in Love with a Married Man"	1954	—	—	—	—	—N/a
"Please Don't Divorce Me"	1954	—	—	—	—	—N/a
"Did You Tell Her About Me"	1955	—	—	—	—	—N/a
"A Satisfied Mind"	1955	—	4	4	—	—N/a
"I Thought of You"	1955	—	10	—	—	—N/a
"This Has Been Your Life"	1956	—	—	—	—	—N/a
"You're Calling Me Sweetheart Again"	1956	—	—	—	—	—N/a
"Thank You Just the Same"	1956	—	—	—	—	—N/a
"Tomorrow I'll Be Gone"	1957	—	—	—	—	—N/a
"The Other Woman"	1957	—	—	—	—	—N/a
"It Scares Me Half to Death"	1957	—	—	—	—	—N/a
"I Used to Love You"	1958	—	—	—	—	—N/a
"He's My Baby"	1958	—	—	—	—	—N/a
"I Want to Go Where No One Knows Me"	1958	—	18	—	—	—N/a
"Have Heart, Will Love"	1959	—	30	—	—	—N/a
"Jeopardy"	1959	—	—	—	—	—N/a
"Heartaches, Teardrops and Sorrow"	1959	—	—	—	—	—N/a
"The One You Slip Around With"	1960	—	—	—	—	—N/a
"How Do I Tell It to a Child"	1960	—	—	—	—	—N/a
"For the Children's Sakes"	1960	—	—	—	—	—N/a
"The Root of All Evil (Is a Man)"	1961	—	—	—	—	—N/a
"How Long Does It Hurt (When a Heart Breaks)"	1961	—	—	—	—	Heartaches and Tears
"The Biggest Cry"	1961	—	—	—	—	—N/a
"Two Voices, Two Shadows, Two Faces"	1962	—	—	—	—	—N/a
"One Less Heartache"	1962	—	—	—	—	—N/a
"It's Torture"	1963	—	—	—	—	—N/a
"When Your House Is Not a Home"	1963	—	—	—	—	Heart, We Did All That We Could
"Second Fiddle (To an Old Guitar)"	1964	—	5	—	—	Heart, We Did All That We Could
"A Tear Dropped By"	1964	—	38	—	—	Heart, We Did All That We Could
"Someone's Gotta Cry"	1965	—	30	—	—	Heart, We Did All That We Could
"It's a Man (Every Time, It's a Man)"	1965	—	—	—	—	It's a Man Every Time
"Many Happy Hangovers to You"	1966	—	13	—	—	Many Happy Hangovers
"I'll Take the Dog" (with Ray Pillow)	1966	—	9	—	—	I'll Take the Dog
"If Teardrops Were Silver"	1966	—	10	—	—	Heart, We Did All That We Could
"Mr. Do-It-Yourself" (with Ray Pillow)	1966	—	25	—	—	—N/a
"Heart, We Did All That We Could"	1967	—	12	—	—	Heart, We Did All That We Could
"Your Forevers (Don't Last Very Long)"	1967	—	17	—	—	Your Forevers Don't Last Very Long
"I Don't See How I Can Make It"	1967	—	40	—	—	Heart to Heart
"An Old Bridge"	1968	—	52	—	—	A Real Good Woman
"A Real Good Woman"	1968	—	32	—	—	A Real Good Woman
"Everyday's a Happy Day for Fools"	1968	—	62	—	—	—N/a
"I'm Tied Around Your Finger"	1969	—	69	—	—	Seven Lonely Days
"Seven Lonely Days"	1969	—	18	—	34	Seven Lonely Days
"Then He Touched Me"	1969	—	8	—	27	A Woman's Hand
"A Woman's Hand"	1970	—	23	—	—	A Woman's Hand
"I Want You Free"	1970	—	22	—	—	A Woman's Hand
"Another Lonely Night"	1970	—	12	—	—	Here & Now
"With His Hand in Mine"	1971	—	24	—	43	Just as Soon as I Get Over Loving You
"Just as Soon as I Get Over Loving You"	1971	—	55	—	—	Just as Soon as I Get Over Loving You
"Safe in These Lovin' Arms of Mine"	1971	—	55	—	—	Just Like Walkin' in the Sunshine
"Virginia"	1972	—	68	—	—	Just Like Walkin' in the Sunshine
"Just Like Walkin' in the Sunshine"	1972	—	46	—	65	Just Like Walkin' in the Sunshine
"Slippin' Away"	1973	81	4	—	3	Slippin' Away
"Come on Phone"	1973	—	36	—	28	Slippin' Away
"At the Time"	1974	—	13	—	24	I'll Do Anything It Takes
"I'll Do Anything It Takes (To Stay with You)"	1974	—	17	—	—	I'll Do Anything It Takes
"Poor Sweet Baby"	1974	—	14	—	17	Poor Sweet Baby... And Ten More Bill Anderson Songs
"The Tip of My Fingers"	1975	—	16	—	25	Poor Sweet Baby... And Ten More Bill Anderson Songs
"I'm a Believer (In a Whole Lot of Lovin')"	1975	—	49	—	—	I'm a Believer
"Another Neon Night"	1975	—	44	—	31	I'm a Believer
"Mercy"	1976	—	49	—	—	Mercy, Ain't Love Good
"Ain't Love Good"	1976	—	41	—	—	Mercy, Ain't Love Good
"I'm Giving You Denver"	1976	—	74	—	—	—N/a
"Hardly a Day Goes By"	1977	—	82	—	—	—N/a
"The Real Thing"	1978	—	85	—	—	—N/a
"Saturday Night Sin"	1978	—	—	—	—	—N/a
"Too Many Rivers"	1981	—	—	—	—	Stars of the Grand Ole Opry
"—" denotes a recording that did not chart or was not released in that territory.

=== Promotional singles ===
List of promotional singles, showing all relevant details
Title	Year	Album	Ref.
"Country Music Time" (with The Wilburn Brothers)	1964	—N/a	
"Where No One Stands Alone"	2021	—N/a	
"Slippin' Away (Bill Anderson's 50th)"	2022	—N/a	
"The Wonders Your Perform (God Bless America Again)"	2022	—N/a	

== Other charted songs ==
List of songs, with selected chart positions, showing other relevant details
Title	Year	Peak chart positions	Album	Notes
Title	Year	US Country	Album	Notes
"Take Possession"	1955	13	—N/a	(Note: Released in May 1955 as the B-side to "A Satisfied Mind".)
"Beautiful Lies"	1955	4	—N/a	(Note: Released in September 1955 as the B-side to "I Thought of You".)

== Other album appearances ==
List of non-single guest appearances, with other performing artists, showing year released and album name
Title	Year	Other artist(s)	Album	Ref.
"A Dear John Letter"	1989	Red Sovine	Famous Duets	
"Jackson"	1989	Red Sovine	Famous Duets	
"Hark! The Herald Angels Sing"	1992	—N/a	Christmas in Nashville	
"O Little Town of Bethlehem"	1993	Faron Young	Country Christmas	
"The Tip of My Fingers"	1998	Bill Anderson; Eddy Arnold; Roy Clark; Steve Wariner	Fine Wine	
"I Didn't Know the Gun Was Loaded"	1999	—N/a	Radio Days, Vol. 1	
"Your Old Love Letters"	1999	Jim Reeves	Radio Days, Vol. 1	
"The Blue Tail Fly"	1999	—N/a	Made in America: Essential Folk	
"Oh Come All Ye Faithful"	1999	—N/a	A Country Christmas	
