= Best by Request =

Studio album (re-recording) by Jean Shepard
- Released: March 1970
- Recorded: September 1967
- Studio: Columbia (Nashville, Tennessee)
- Genre: Country
- Label: Capitol
- Producer: Billy Graves

Jean Shepard chronology
Seven Lonely Days (1969)	Best by Request (1970)	A Woman's Hand (1970)

Best by Request is a studio album by American country singer Jean Shepard. It was released in March 1970 by Capitol Records and was her fifteenth studio album. The songs were re-recordings Shepard revisited, which were considered her best known songs such as "A Satisfied Mind" and "Beautiful Lies". Best by Request made the US country albums chart following its release and received a positive review from Cash Box magazine.

== Background, recording and content ==
Jean Shepard had been on Capitol Records since the 1950s. She topped the country music charts in 1953 with "A Dear John Letter" and would go on to have 20 years of commercial success, continually returning to a traditional country sound. By 1970, Shepard had a series of collaborative and solo singles make the top ten such as "A Satisfied Mind", "Second Fiddle (To an Old Guitar)", "I'll Take the Dog", "If Teardrops Were Silver" and "Then He Touched Me". Capitol continued releasing a regular output of Shepard's material, including 1970's Best by Request. The album was recorded by producer Billy Graves three years prior, specifically in September 1967 at the Columbia Studios in Nashville, Tennessee. The 12-track collection consisted of re-recordings that had Shepard singing some of her most well-known material. Shepard revisited songs re-recorded from the 1950s like "A Satisfied Mind", "Beautiful Lies" and "The Other Woman".

== Release, critical reception and chart performance ==
Best by Request was released by Capitol Records in March 1970 and was Shepard's fifteenth studio album. Capitol distributed the disc as a vinyl LP, with six songs on each side of the record. In 1972, the album was released in Australia in a vinyl LP format by the World Record Club. Best by Request received a positive response from Cash Box magazine, calling it a "strong album". The magazine also believed that fans of Shepard's would enjoy the re-recordings of her most familiar songs and highlighted some of them in the review. Best by Request reached number 23 on the US Billboard Top Country Albums chart. It was her highest-charting album on Billboard since the release of 1967's Your Forevers Don't Last Very Long and her last to chart until 1973's Slippin' Away.

== Track listing ==
Side one
No.	Title	Writer(s)	Length
1.	"A Satisfied Mind"	Jack Rhodes; Red Hayes	2:37
2.	"I Learned It All from You"	Tommy Collins	2:37
3.	"Under Suspicion"	B. Raleigh; I. Kosloff	2:07
4.	"You're Calling Me Sweetheart Again"	G. Cox; J. Rhodes	2:20
5.	"I Love You Because"	Leon Payne	2:26
6.	"The Other Woman"	Beverly Small	2:14

Side two
No.	Title	Writer(s)	Length
1.	"Beautiful Lies"	J. Rhodes	2:51
2.	"Take Possession"	Helen Martell; Tom Glazer	2:57
3.	"You're Telling Me Sweet Lies Again"	G. Cox; J. Rhodes	2:23
4.	"I'd Rather Die Young"	Smith; Vaughan; Wood	2:20
5.	"Why Did You Wait?"	Bettie Westergard	2:33
6.	"Don't Fall in Love with a Married Man"	J. Penney; R. Fortner	2:36

== Chart performance ==
Chart (1970)	Peak position
US Top Country Albums (Billboard)	23

== Release history ==
Region	Date	Format	Label	Ref.
North America	March 1970	Vinyl LP (Stereo)	Capitol Records	
Australia	1972	Vinyl LP (Stereo)	World Record Club	
