= The Best of Jean Shepard =

Compilation album by Jean Shepard
- Released: September 1963
- Recorded: 1953–1961
- Genre: Country
- Label: Capitol
- Producer: Ken Nelson

Jean Shepard chronology
Heartaches and Tears (1962)	The Best of Jean Shepard (1963)	Lighthearted and Blue (1964)

The Best of Jean Shepard is a compilation album by American country singer Jean Shepard. It was released in September 1963 by Capitol Records and was her second compilation released in her career. The album featured 12 tracks, four of which were top ten singles on the US country chart: "A Dear John Letter", "Forgive Me, John", "A Satisfied Mind" and "Beautiful Lies". The compilation received positive reviews following its release.

== Background, recording and content ==
In 1953, Jean Shepard broke through into the country music mainstream with the number one duet with Ferlin Husky: "A Dear John Letter". In 1955, she had her first pair of top ten solo singles: "A Satisfied Mind" and "Beautiful Lies". As the decade progressed, Shepard was unable to recreate her previous success. It would not be until 1964 that she would have a commercial return. Yet her label (Capitol) continued releasing material during this period. Among the material Capitol released was a compilation in 1963 titled The Best of Jean Shepard. The album featured previously recorded material cut between 1953 and 1961 produced by Ken Nelson. It was a collection of 12 tracks. The album featured four of Shepard's top ten singles on the US Billboard country chart. This included "A Dear John Letter" and its follow-up single "Forgive Me, John" (also recorded with Ferlin Husky). It also featured "A Satisfied Mind" and "Beautiful Lies". Other tracks were previously released non-single tracks such as "I've Got to Talk to Mary" and Under Suspicion".

== Release and critical reception ==
Professional ratings
Review scores
Source	Rating
Allmusic	4/5 stars
Record Mirror	3/5 stars

The Best of Jean Shepard was originally released in September 1963 on Capitol Records. It was the second compilation of Shepard's career. It was issued as a vinyl LP offered in both mono and stereo formats. The disc included six songs on either side. In the 2020s decade, the album was re-released to digital platforms which included Apple Music. The compilation was given positive reviews by publications. Billboard magazine named it a "country special merit" pick when reviewing it in November 1963. "A package that can do good, long haul business," the magazine concluded. Record Mirror magazine rated it three out of five stars, calling Shepard a "sharper" version of Patsy Cline. "You'll like this because it is well performed and sung," the publication concluded. AllMusic's Dan Cooper gave the album four out of five stars, writing, "A good compilation of her first wave of hits ("A Dear John Letter," "A Satisfied Mind"), this is also the LP that shows up most often in used record bins."

== Track listing ==
Side one

1. "A Satisfied Mind" – (Red Hayes, Jack Rhodes)
2. "A Dear John Letter" – (Billy Barton, Fuzzy Owen, Lewis Talley)
  - with Ferlin Husky
3. "Forgive Me, John" – (Billy Barton, Jean Shepard, Lewis Talley)
  - with Ferlin Husky
4. "The Other Woman" – (Beverly Small)
5. "Two Voices, Two Shadows, Two Faces" – (Kurt Hertha, Ned Miller, Sue Miller)
6. "The Root of All Evil (Is a Man)" – (Jeri Jones)

Side two

1. "Beautiful Lies" – (Rhodes)
2. "How Long Does It Hurt (When a Heart Breaks)" – (Virginia Midgett, D.W. Orinich)
3. "I've Got to Talk to Mary" – (Jeane Mosher, Lorraine Wilson)
4. "Don't Fall in Love with a Married Man" – (Red Fortner, Joe Penny)
5. "Under Suspicion" – (Ira Kosloff, Ben Raleigh)
6. "I Learned It All from You" – (Tommy Collins)

== Release history ==
Region	Date	Format	Label	Ref.
North America	September 1963	Vinyl LP (Mono); Vinyl LP (Stereo)	Capitol Records	
United Kingdom	September 1963	Vinyl LP (Mono); Vinyl LP (Stereo)	Capitol Records	
United States	circa 2020	Music download; streaming	Capitol Records Nashville	
