= Stars of the Grand Ole Opry (Jean Shepard album) =

Studio album by Jean Shepard
- Released: May 1981
- Studio: Pete's Place
- Genre: Country
- Label: First Generation
- Producer: Pete Drake

Jean Shepard chronology
Mercy, Ain't Love Good (1976)	Stars of the Grand Ole Opry (1981)	Together at Last (1985)

Singles from Stars of the Grand Ole Opry
- 1. "Too Many Rivers" Released: 1981

Stars of the Grand Ole Opry is a studio album by American country singer Jean Shepard. It was released by First Generation Records in May 1981 and was her twenty fifth studio album. The project was crafted by its producer, Pete Drake, who wanted to give voice to fans of veteran-era country music performers. The album's ten tracks consisted of new material and some re-recordings. It was re-released several times over the years and was given reviews as well.

== Background ==
According to The Tennessean, Jean Shepard was considered a forerunner for women in country music, recording a series of records beginning in the 1950s that later were said to influence Loretta Lynn. Her most popular works were completed with Capitol Records and then at United Artists Records. Her last single would be the 1981 song "Too Many Rivers". The song was featured on Shepard's 1981 album project Stars of the Grand Ole Opry. The project was derived from producer Pete Drake who had founded the First Generation record label. Shepard's project was among several albums with a similar title by veteran-era country artists like Jan Howard, Ray Pillow and Charlie Louvin. Drake believed the album series would cater to an older audience that wanted to hear veteran artists.

== Recording and content ==
Stars of the Grand Ole Opry was recorded at Pete's Place, a studio owned and operated by the album's producer, Pete Drake. The studio was located in Nashville, Tennessee. The album consisted of ten recordings, some of the songs were new recordings while some were re-recordings of popular songs from her catalog. The first five tracks were new songs in Shepard's catalog: "Too Many Rivers", "All Alone in Austin", "Leavin' Fever", "What Would You Do" and "The Palm of Your Hand". The remaining five tracks were newly recorded versions of Shepard singles such as "Second Fiddle (To an Old Guitar)", "Then He Touched Me" and "Slippin' Away".

== Release, reception and singles ==
Professional ratings
Review scores
Source	Rating
Allmusic	3/5 stars

Stars of the Grand Ole Opry was originally released by First Generation Records in May 1981. It was the twenty fifth studio album of Shepard's career. The label distributed it as a vinyl LP, with five songs on either side of the disc. The album has been reissued several times. In 1982, it was re-released by the Phonorama label under the title Slippin' Away. In 1993, it was re-released in a compact disc format through the LaserLight label under the title Dear John. Under its original title, it was re-released to digital markets. In the original 1981 release, First Generation planned to mail 5,000 brochures to country music retailers in the US. It was also promoted through a television marketing campaign. It was further promoted in a television special that aired in August 1981 titled Country Music Celebration.

The album's only single was Shepard's new recording of Harlan Howard's "Too Many Rivers". In June 1981, Billboard reviewed each artist's project in the Stars of the 'Grand Ole Opry series' including Shepard. The magazine noted that Shepard's vocal was notably in the traditional country vein, writing, "Their performances are unapologetically old-timey. Yet the emotional power they build up illustrates why the form perseveres, even without airplay." Dan Cooper of AllMusic reviewed the Dear John re-release and rated it three out of five stars.

== Track listing ==
=== Stars of the Grand Ole Opry and Dear John ===
Side one
No.	Title	Writer(s)	Length
1.	"Too Many Rivers"	H. Howard	2:33
2.	"What Would I Do"	J. Foster; B. Rice	2:54
3.	"The Palm of Your Hand"	D. Puckett; P. Drake	3:01
4.	"Leavin' Fever"	T. Cash; L. Morgan	2:13
5.	"All Alone in Austin"	L. Hargrove	2:36

Side two
No.	Title	Writer(s)	Length
1.	"Slippin' Away"	B. Anderson	2:33
2.	"Then He Touched Me"	N. Wilson; G. Richey	2:56
3.	"Seven Lonely Days"	K. Frasier	2:26
4.	"Dear John"	B. Barton; F. Owens; L. Talley	2:36
5.	"Second Fiddle to an Old Guitar"	B. Amos	2:04

=== Slippin' Away ===
Side one
No.	Title	Writer(s)	Length
1.	"Slippin' Away"	B. Anderson	2:39
2.	"Then He Touched Me"	N. Wilson; G. Richey	2:56
3.	"The Book of You and Me"	G. Goodman	2:47
4.	"Leavin' Fever"	T. Cash; L. Morgan	2:13
5.	"The Palm of Your Hand"	D. Puckett; P. Drake	2:59

Side two
No.	Title	Writer(s)	Length
1.	"Dear John"	B. Barton; F. Owens; L. Talley	2:36
2.	"Second Fiddle to an Old Guitar"	B. Amos	2:04
3.	"Seven Lonely Days"	K. Frasier	2:26
4.	"Too Many Rivers"	H. Howard	2:33
5.	"All Alone in Austin"	L. Hargrove	2:35

== Personnel ==
All credits are adapted from the liner notes of Stars of the Grand Ole Opry.

Musical and technical personnel

- Jimmy Capps – Guitar
- Jerry Carrigan – Drums
- Pete Drake – Producer, steel guitar
- Ray Edenton – Guitar
- Bunky Keels – Piano
- Bill Hullett – Guitar
- The Jordanaires – Backup vocals
- Weldon Myrick – Steel guitar
- Leon Rhodes – Guitar
- Hargus "Pig" Robbins – Piano
- Billy Sanford – Guitar
- Jean Shepard – Lead vocals
- Buddy Spicher – Fiddle

== Release history ==
Region	Date	Format	Label	Ref.
North America	May 1981	Vinyl LP (Stereo)	First Generation Records	
North America	1982	Vinyl LP (Stereo)	Phonorama Records	
North America	1993	Compact disc	LaserLight Digital	
North America	circa 2010	Music download; streaming	First Generation Records	
