= Two Little Boys (Jean Shepard song) =

Single by Jean Shepard
- A-side: "Second Fiddle (To an Old Guitar)"
- Released: April 1964
- Recorded: January 27, 1964
- Studio: Columbia (Nashville, Tennessee)
- Genre: Country
- Length: 2:48
- Label: Capitol
- Songwriter(s): Don & Harold Hawkins
- Producer(s): Marvin Hughes

Jean Shepard singles chronology
"When Your House Is Not a Home" (1963)	"Two Little Boys" (1964)	"A Tear Dropped By" (1964)

"Two Little Boys" is a song written by Marty Robbins that was recorded by American country singer Jean Shepard. It served as the B-side to her top ten US country single "Second Fiddle (To an Old Guitar)". While Robbins composed the track, the original single release is credited to Shepard's two sons Don and Harold Hawkins. The song is about the two boys left behind after Shepard lost her husband Hawkshaw Hawkins in a plane crash. The song was met with positive reception from writers in later years.

== Background ==
Jean Shepard first rose to country music stardom during the honky tonk era of the 1950s. She was one of only a few women who had found success as a solo artist during this period. Singles like "A Satisfied Mind", "I Thought of You" and "Beautiful Lies" reached the US country top ten. Then as the 1950s progressed, Shepard's honky tonk singles found less commercial success as rock and roll and crossover country became in vogue. In 1960, she married country artist Hawkshaw Hawkins. However, in 1963, he was killed in a plane crash that also killed Patsy Cline, Cowboy Copas and pilot Randy Hughes.

At the time of Hawkins' death, Shepard had a fifteen-month old son (Don Robin Hawkins) and was eight months pregnant expecting the couple's second son (Harold Hawkins). The latter son was later born in April 1963. Later in 1963, Shepard was walking into the Cedarwood Publishing company in Nashville, Tennessee when she passed singer–songwriter Marty Robbins. Robbins, who was a close friend of Shepard and Hawkins, told her that he wanted to write a song about her loss. In response, Shepard replied, "You can't write a song for me because you don't know how I feel." Nonetheless, Robbins wrote a song about Shepard's grieving which he titled "Two Little Boys". Upon hearing it, Shepard was impressed and later told him, "Robbins, you did a pretty damn good job."

== Content and recording ==
"Two Little Boys" recounts the feelings of a wife who loses her spouse and explains how her spouse would have been pleased with the way the children have since developed. The lyrics also detail how the wife sees her spouse in her two children. "Two Little Boys" was recorded on January 27, 1964 at the Columbia Recording Studios in Nashville, Tennessee. Two additional tracks were cut on the same session: "He Plays the Bongo (I Play the Banjo)" and the A-side of the eventual single release "Second Fiddle (To an Old Guitar)". The session was produced by Marvin Hughes.

== Release and critical reception ==
"Two Little Boys" was released in April 1964 by Capitol Records. It was distributed as a seven-inch vinyl single. The song served as the B-side to the track "Second Fiddle (To an Old Guitar)". The A-side would become Shepard's first charting single since 1959, reaching the US country top ten and relaunching her commercial success. With the exception of the original single, "Two Little Boys" would not be released on an official album until Bear Family Records released The Melody Ranch Girl box set in 1995. Shepard performed "Two Little Boys" on The Wilburn Brothers television show following its original release. In re-watching the original video, she recalled, "You can just almost read my face. I wasn't myself, I was just flat sad."

Although Marty Robbins, wrote the song, he did not credit himself on the official single release. Robbins had been known to do this with several songs he composed. Instead, "Two Little Boys" was credited on the single release to "Don & Harold Hawkins". According to Shepard, Robbins credited Shepard's two sons so they would receive royalties from the single. "I thought that was the most wonderful thing to do," she recalled in her autobiography. "Two Little Boys" was given a written review by AllMusic's Bruce Eder who described it as "a slow ballad played with delicacy and reverence". Writers Mary A. Bufwack and Robert K. Oermann called it "a touching ballad" in their book Finding Their Voice: The History of Women in Country Music.

== Track listings ==
7" vinyl single

- "Second Fiddle (To an Old Guitar)" – 2:11
- "Two Little Boys" – 2:48
