= Heart, We Did All That We Could (album) =

Studio album by Jean Shepard
- Released: March 1967
- Recorded: August 1963–October 1966
- Studio: Columbia (Nashville, Tennessee)
- Genre: Country
- Label: Capitol Records
- Producer: Marvin Hughes

Jean Shepard chronology
I'll Take the Dog (1966)	Heart, We Did All That We Could (1967)	Your Forevers Don't Last Very Long (1967)

Singles from Heart, We Did All That We Could
- 1. "When Your House Is Not a Home" Released: October 1963; 2. "Second Fiddle (To an Old Guitar)" Released: April 1964; 3. "A Tear Dropped By" Released: October 1964; 4. "Someone's Gotta Cry" Released: April 1965; 5. "If Teardrops Were Silver" Released: June 1966; 6. "Heart, We Did All That We Could" Released: January 1967

Heart, We Did All That We Could is a studio album by American country singer Jean Shepard. It was released in March 1967 by Capitol Records and featured 12 tracks. The album's material centered on heartbreak and despair. Six of the tracks were originally singles released between 1963 and 1967. Both "Second Fiddle (To an Old Guitar)" and "If Teardrops Were Silver" reached the US country top ten, while the title track reached the top 20. The album itself reached the US country top ten in 1967. The disc received positive reviews from both Billboard and Cashbox.

== Background, recording and content ==
Jean Shepard first rose to success in the 1950s during country music's honky tonk era. This included the number one single "A Dear John Letter", followed by the top ten singles "A Satisfied Mind" and "Beautiful Lies". By the end of the 1950s, Shepard's success waned with the popularity of country pop. Then, Shepard had a commercial comeback in 1964 with the single "Second Fiddle (To an Old Guitar)" and this would start a series of charting singles. Her 1967 album Heart, We Did All That We Could featured her chart hits from this era. The album was recorded in sessions taken over three years. They were held between August 1963 and October 1966. All sessions were produced by Marvin Hughes at the Columbia Studios in Nashville, Tennessee.

Heart, We Did All That We Could was a collection of 12 tracks. The song's themes centered around heartbreak, despair and lost love. Songs like "Heart to Heart" tell the story of a woman giving advice to the new female partner of her former lover. In the track "Outstanding in Your Field", the main character warns another woman to stay away from her lover. In the song "It's the Wine Talking", the main character details how alcohol has affected her relationship. Songwriters featured on the album included Bonnie Owens, Ned Miller and Roger Miller.

== Release and critical reception ==
Heart, We Did All That We Could was released by Capitol Records in March 1967. It was issued as a vinyl LP, with six songs on each record. It was offered in both mono and stereo formats. It was the ninth studio album in Shepard's career. The album received positive reviews from publications following its release. Billboard wrote, "Take a dozen songs of broken love, let Jean Shepard pour her heart out, and you have an album that's destined to be a top seller." Cash Box found the album to be a collection of "attractive weepers", concluding, "Should be loads of sales attention in store for this one." AllMusic did not provide a formal review of the album but rated it three out of five stars.

== Chart performance and singles ==
Heart, We Did All That We Could reached the number six position on the US Billboard Top Country Albums chart in 1967. It was Shepard's second (and final) album in her career to reach the top ten position on the country chart. Her first was Many Happy Hangovers (1966), which also reached the number six position. Both albums were highest-charting in her career as well. A total of six singles were included on Heart, We Did All That We Could. Its first was "When Your House Is Not a Home", which was first released in October 1963. The second was "Second Fiddle (To an Old Guitar)", which was originally issued in April 1964. It became the album's highest-charting single, climbing to the number five position on the US Billboard Hot Country Songs chart. "A Tear Dropped By" was released as the third single in October 1964. It reached the number 38 position on the US Hot Country Songs chart. The fourth single was "Someone's Gotta Cry" in April 1965. It reached number 30 on the US country chart. "If Teardrops Were Silver" was released as a single in June 1966, also reaching the US country top ten, peaking at number ten. The title track was the sixth and final single. First issued in January 1967, it reached number 12 on the US country chart.

== Track listing ==
Side one
No.	Title	Writer(s)	Length
1.	"Heart, We Did All That We Could"	Ned Miller	2:36
2.	"Too Many Memories All Around"	Carol Johnson	2:20
3.	"Heart to Heart (And Fool to Fool)"	Billy J. Smith	2:39
4.	"Second Fiddle (To an Old Guitar)"	Betty Amos	2:11
5.	"A Tear Dropped By"	Larry Lee; Rusty Adams	2:20
6.	"Goodnight Me"	Jim Throckmorton	3:24

Side two
No.	Title	Writer(s)	Length
1.	"If Teardrops Were Silver"	Don Wayne	2:17
2.	"Someone's Gotta Cry"	Don Bowman	2:43
3.	"Outstanding in Your Field"	Lee	2:07
4.	"It's the Wine That's Talkin'"	Ray Griff	2:11
5.	"Don't Take Advantage of Me"	Bobby Morris; Bonnie Owens	2:27
6.	"When Your House Is Not a Home"	Roger Miller	2:24

== Chart performance ==
Chart (1966)	Peak position
US Top Country Albums (Billboard)	6

== Release history ==
Region	Date	Format	Label	Ref.
North America; United Kingdom	March 1967	Vinyl LP (Mono); Vinyl LP (Stereo)	Capitol Records	
