= Songs of a Love Affair =

Studio album by Jean Shepard
- Released: May 1956
- Recorded: August 1953 – December 1955
- Studio: Capitol Studios
- Genre: Country; Bakersfield Sound
- Label: Capitol
- Producer: Ken Nelson

Jean Shepard chronology
Songs of a Love Affair (1956)	Lonesome Love (1958)

Songs of a Love Affair is the debut studio album by American country artist Jean Shepard. The album was released in May 1956 on Capitol Records and was produced by Ken Nelson. The release has been said to have been one of country music's first concept albums in history and also one of the first to be released by a female country music artist. The album's concept focused on an extramarital love affair between a husband and another lover. The album is told from the point of the view of the wife. The disc was released originally on vinyl, but later released on CD and to digital markets.

== Background ==
Jean Shepard first found success at the Capitol label in two duets with Ferlin Husky: "A Dear John Letter" and "Forgive Me, John". Both singles were commercial successes in 1953. It was not until 1955 that her first pair of solo singles made the US country top ten: "A Satisfied Mind" and "Beautiful Lies". In 1956, Capitol issued her debut studio album Songs of a Love Affair. According to several publications, Songs of a Love Affair was among the first country music concept albums. Songs were handpicked by Shepard's producer Ken Nelson. Nelson wanted the album to be told from the point of view of a woman whose spouse has betrayed her. "Oh we can't have you having a love affair in a song! You're just a sweet little country girl! We've got to keep this nice little country girl image," Nelson told her.

== Recording and content ==
Songs of a Love Affair consisted of 12 tracks. The project was recorded in sessions held at Capitol Studios in Hollywood, California. Sessions were produced by Ken Nelson and were cut between August 1953 and December 1955. Many of the album's songs were written by the same writers, notably Jack Rhodes, Mary McDaniel and Don Welch. The album's concept was based around a failing marriage due to a extramarital love affair between a man and a woman.

The album's title track "Passing Love Affair" was claimed to be written exclusively for Shepard and the album itself. The latter described a wife who avoids thinking about an affair between her husband and another woman. The second track "Girl in Disgrace" finds the same character angry about the affair. "Over and Over" shows the character ruminating over the extramarital affair. In "The Mysteries of Life", Shepard's character explains her situation from a mature standpoint. "I'll Thank You All My Life" finds the character "discovering a new love", according to the liner notes. In the tracks "Sad Singin' and Slow Ridin'" and "Did I Turn Down a Better Deal", Shepard's character second-guesses her romantic choices.

== Release and critical reception ==
Professional ratings
Review scores
Source	Rating
Allmusic	4.5/5 stars

Songs of a Love Affair was first released by Capitol Records in May 1956. It was originally distributed as a vinyl LP with six tracks on each side of the disc. It was the debut studio album of Shepard's career. In 1998, the album was reissued on a compact disc in conjunction with her 1962 studio project Heartaches and Tears. The reissue was released by both Capitol and the EMI labels. In the 2010s decade, Songs of a Love Affair was issued digitally by Capitol Records Nashville to sites including Apple Music. Songs of a Love Affair was given a four and a half star rating from AllMusic with no written review provided.

== Track listing ==
Side one
No.	Title	Writer(s)	Length
1.	"A Passing Love Affair"	Jack Rhodes; Jack Rollings	2:23
2.	"Shadows on the Wall"	Ronnie Badger; Tommy Reiff	2:25
3.	"Girls in Disgrace"	Mary McDaniel; Dan Welch	2:45
4.	"Over and Over"	McDaniel; Welch	2:21
5.	"Hello Old Broken Heart"	Audrey Allison; Joe Allison	2:10
6.	"The Mysteries of Life"	Virgil F. Stewart	2:36

Side two
No.	Title	Writer(s)	Length
1.	"Tell Me What I Want to Hear"	Gertrude Cox; Rhodes	2:23
2.	"I'll Thank You for All My Life"	Lucille Dean; Dick Reynolds	2:33
3.	"Sad Singin' and Slow Ridin'"	Curly Fox; Texas Ruby	2:35
4.	"Did I Turn Down a Better Deal"	Tommy Collins	2:21
5.	"I Married You for Love"	Rhodes	2:13
6.	"It's Hard to Tell the Married from the Free"	Don Helms; Gene Jackson	2:36

== Release history ==
Region	Date	Format	Label	Ref.
North America	May 1956	Vinyl LP (Mono)	Capitol Records	
Europe and North America	1998	Compact disc	Capitol Records; EMI	
North America	circa 2010	Music download; streaming	Capitol Records Nashville	
