= Many Happy Hangovers to You =

Single by Jean Shepard

from the album Many Happy Hangovers
- B-side: "Our Past Is in My Way"
- Released: January 1966
- Recorded: September 1965
- Studio: Columbia (Nashville, Tennessee)
- Genre: Country
- Length: 2:27
- Label: Capitol
- Songwriter(s): Johnny MacRae
- Producer(s): Marvin Hughes

Jean Shepard singles chronology
"It's a Man (Every Time, It's a Man)" (1965)	"Many Happy Hangovers to You" (1966)	"I'll Take the Dog" (1966)

"Many Happy Hangovers to You" is a song written by Johnny MacRae that was originally recorded by American country singer Jean Shepard. It was released as a single by Capitol Records in 1966, reaching the US country top 20 that year. It received a positive review from Billboard magazine following its release and was included on her 1966 studio album of a similar name.

== Background, recording and content ==
Jean Shepard first rose to fame in the 1950s honky tonk era of country music. Songs like "A Dear John Letter", "A Satisfied Mind" and "Beautiful Lies" reached the US country singles top ten. When country pop replaced traditional country sounds on the radio, Shepard's popularity declined. She had a career relaunch in 1964 with the top ten single "Second Fiddle (To an Old Guitar)". This would be followed by 15 more top 40 country songs during the 1960s. Among them was "Many Happy Hangovers", whose story line centers on a wife who notices her spouse consistently drinking alcohol. The song was written by Johnny MacRae and was produced by Marvin Hughes. The track was cut at the Columbia Studio in September 1965.

== Release, critical reception and chart performance ==
"Many Happy Hangovers to You" was released as a single by Capitol Records in January 1966. It was distributed by the label as a seven-inch vinyl single. On its B-side was the song "Our Past Is in My Way". The single received a positive response from Billboard magazine who wrote, "Good country material and an exceptional Jean Shepard performance should have no trouble climbing the country chart." It was then released on the corresponding album of a similar title Many Happy Hangovers. "Many Happy Hangovers to You" reached the top 20 of the US Billboard Hot Country Songs chart, peaking at the number 13 position in 1966. It became Shepard's ninth top 20 single on the Billboard country chart in her career.

== Track listings ==
7" vinyl single

- "Many Happy Hangovers to You" – 2:27
- "Our Past Is in My Way" – 2:44

== Charts ==
Weekly chart performance for "Many Happy Hangovers to You"
Chart (1966)	Peak position
US Hot Country Songs (Billboard)	13
