= If Teardrops Were Silver =

Single by Jean Shepard

from the album Heart, We Did All That We Could
- B-side: "Outstanding in Your Field"
- Released: June 1966
- Recorded: December 1965
- Studio: Columbia (Nashville, Tennessee)
- Genre: Country
- Length: 2:07
- Label: Capitol
- Songwriter(s): Don Wayne
- Producer(s): Marvin Hughes

Jean Shepard singles chronology
"I'll Take the Dog" (1966)	"If Teardrops Were Silver" (1966)	"Mister, Do It Yourself" (1966)

"If Teardrops Were Silver" is a song written by Don Wayne that was originally recorded by American country singer Jean Shepard. It was released as a single by Capitol Records in 1966, reaching the US country top ten that year. It received positive responses from Cashbox and Record World magazines. It was included on her 1967 studio album of a Heart, We Did All That We Could.

== Background, recording and content ==
Jean Shepard had nearly 20 years of commercial success in the country field, beginning in the 1950s honky tonk era. She topped the charts with Ferlin Husky on "A Dear John Letter" and reached the top ten as a solo artist with "A Satisfied Mind" and "Beautiful Lies". After several years of declining popularity she had a comeback in 1964 with the top ten single "Second Fiddle (To an Old Guitar)". A series of top 40 singles followed in the 1960s, including the top ten recording "If Teardrops Were Silver" The ballad's theme centered on heartbreak and was composed by Don Wayne. The song was produced by Marvin Hughes in December 1965 at the Columbia Studios in Nashville, Tennessee.

== Release, critical reception and chart performance ==
"If Teardrops Were Silver" was released as a single by Capitol Records in June 1966. It was distributed by the label as a seven-inch vinyl single. On its B-side was the song "Outstanding in Your Field". It received positive reception from Cash Box magazine who called the song "very pretty" and "bittersweet". Record World also praised the tune, writing, "Clever torch song should turn into one of Jean's biggest to date. Pretty song, pretty singing." "If Teardrops Were Silver" reached number ten on the US Billboard Hot Country Songs chart. It became her eighth single to place in the Billboard country top ten. In 1967, it was included on her studio album Heart, We Did All That We Could.

== Track listings ==
7" vinyl single

- "If Teardrops Were Silver" – 2:07
- "Outstanding in Your Field" – 2:17

== Charts ==
Weekly chart performance for "If Teardrops Were Silver"
Chart (1966)	Peak position
US Hot Country Songs (Billboard)	10
