= Someone's Gotta Cry =

Single by Jean Shepard

from the album Heart, We Did All That We Could
- B-side: "Don't Take Advantage of Me"
- Released: April 1965
- Recorded: October 13, 1964
- Studio: Columbia (Nashville, Tennessee)
- Genre: Country
- Length: 2:43
- Label: Capitol
- Songwriter(s): Don Bowman
- Producer(s): Marvin Hughes

Jean Shepard singles chronology
"A Tear Dropped By" (1964)	"Someone's Gotta Cry" (1965)	"It's a Man (Every Time, It's a Man)" (1965)

"Someone's Gotta Cry" is a song written by Don Bowman that was originally recorded by American country singer Jean Shepard. It was released as a single in 1965, reaching the top 40 of the US country chart that year. It was one of 30 top 40 singles Shepard had in her career. It was given positive reviews from critics following its release.

== Background, content and recording ==
During the 1950s honky tonk era of country music, Jean Shepard had risen to success with a series of top ten singles. This included "A Dear John Letter" and "A Satisfied Mind". When the country pop musical style replaced honky tonk on radio, Shepard's popularity waned. Then in 1964, she returned with the top ten single "Second Fiddle (To an Old Guitar)". "Someone's Gotta Cry" was among a series of follow-up singles that would make the country charts in the 1960s for Shepard. Written by Don Bowman, the song was described by Cash Box as a "weeper". The song was recorded on October 13, 1964, at the Columbia Studios in Nashville, Tennessee. The session was produced by Marvin Hughes. Three additional sides were cut at the same session.

== Release, critical reception and chart performance ==
"Someone's Gotta Cry" was released as a single by Capitol Records in October 1964. It was issued by the label as a seven-inch vinyl record. On the B-side was the song "Don't Take Advantage of Me". Cashbox praised the track, finding it to be "a hauntingly pretty, slow-moving tradition-styled hillbilly weeper." "Someone's Gotta Cry" was among 30 songs that Shepard had in her career to make the top 40. In 1965, it reached the number 30 position on the US Billboard Hot Country Songs chart. In 1967, it was included on her studio album Heart, We Did All That We Could.

== Track listings ==
7" vinyl single

- "Someone's Gotta Cry" – 2:43
- "Don't Take Advantage of Me" – 2:27

== Charts ==
Weekly chart performance for "Someone's Gotta Cry"
Chart (1965)	Peak position
US Hot Country Songs (Billboard)	30
