= Heart, We Did All That We Could =

Single by Jean Shepard

from the album Heart, We Did All That We Could
- B-side: "My Momma Didn't Raise No Fools"
- Released: January 1967
- Recorded: October 1966
- Studio: Columbia (Nashville, Tennessee)
- Genre: Country
- Length: 2:36
- Label: Capitol
- Songwriter: Ned Miller
- Producer: Marvin Hughes

Jean Shepard singles chronology
"Mr. Do-It-Yourself" (1966)	"Heart, We Did All That We Could" (1967)	"Your Forevers (Don't Last Very Long)" (1967)

"Heart, We Did All That We Could" is a song written by Ned Miller that was originally recorded by American country singer Jean Shepard. It was released as a single in 1967 and reached the top 20 of the US country songs chart. It received positive reviews from music publications was included on Shepard's studio album of the same name. The song has been performed routinely in the Country Bear Jamboree entertainment attraction at Walt Disney World.

== Background, recording and content ==
Jean Shepard went on to have 20 years of commercial success in country music. Beginning in the 1950s honky tonk era, she topped the charts with "A Dear John Letter" and the top ten with "A Satisfied Mind". As the decade progressed and country pop became more in-vogue, Shepard's career waned. Then, she had a career relaunch in 1964 with the top ten single "Second Fiddle (To an Old Guitar)". Fifteen more songs placed in the country top 40 during the decade. One of them was "Heart, We Did All That We Could". Written by Ned Miller, the ballad's story centers on a woman who is in despair following a breakup with a lover. The song was recorded in October 1966 at the Columbia Studios in Nashville, Tennessee. It was produced by Marvin Hughes.

== Release, critical reception and chart performance ==
"Heart, We Did All That We Could" was released as a single by Capitol Records in January 1967. It was distributed by Capitol as a seven-inch vinyl single. On its B-side was the uptempo song "My Momma Didn't Raise No Fools". "Heart, We Did All That We Could" received positive reception from music publications following its release. Cash Box magazine described it as a "low-down effort" that "should be rewarded with a good bit of acceptance". Billboard found that Shepard provided a "moving treatment" of the song, further writing that it "is the perfect vehicle" to place on the country charts. "Heart, We Did All That We Could" reached the top 20 of the US Billboard Hot Country Songs chart, rising to the number 12 position in 1967. It was Shepard's twelfth single to place on the Billboard country top 20. Later that year, it was included on her studio album of the same title.

The song has been performed for over fifty years by Teddi Bara, a character from the Country Bear Jamboree, an entertainment show featured in Walt Disney World's Magic Kingdom.

== Track listings ==
7" vinyl single

- "Heart, We Did All That We Could" – 2:36
- "My Momma Didn't Raise No Fools" – 2:02

== Charts ==
Weekly chart performance for "Heart, We Did All That We Could"
Chart (1967)	Peak position
US Hot Country Songs (Billboard)	12
