= I'll Take the Dog (album) =

Studio album by Jean Shepard and Ray Pillow
- Released: November 1966
- Recorded: January–March 1966
- Genre: Country
- Label: Capitol
- Producer: Marvin Hughes

Jean Shepard chronology
Many Happy Hangovers (1966)	I'll Take the Dog (1966)	Heart, We Did All That We Could (1967)

Ray Pillow chronology
Presenting Ray Pillow (1965)	I'll Take the Dog (1966)	Even When It's Bad, It's Good (1967)

Singles from I'll Take the Dog
- 1. "I'll Take the Dog" Released: April 1966

I'll Take the Dog is a studio album by American country artists Jean Shepard and Ray Pillow. It was released in November 1966 by Capitol Records and was a collection of duets between the duo. The album's songs focused on marital conflicts and other themes. Its title track was a top ten single on the US country chart in 1966. The album itself reached the top 20 of the US country chart. The album was met with positive reviews from Cash Box and Record World.

== Background, recording and content ==
Jean Shepard found success in the 1950s honky tonk era of country music, having top ten singles with "A Satisfied Mind" and "Beautiful Lies". As the Nashville Sound and other pop-oriented styles became in vogue, Shepard's commercial success. Then in 1964, she returned with the top five single "Second Fiddle (To an Old Guitar)". It would be followed by a series of charting singles, including 1966 top ten single with Ray Pillow "I'll Take the Dog". Ray Pillow was known as both a music publisher (working with Capitol Records) and as a musical artist. He had a top 20 single with 1965's "Thank You Ma'am" followed by several more chart records. The duo's only album together would be named for their top ten single of the same name.

I'll Take the Dog was recorded in sessions held at the Columbia Studios (located in Nashville, Tennessee) between January and March 1966. It was produced by Marvin Hughes. The album project consisted of 12 tracks. All 12 songs were a collection of duets whose themes focused mostly on marital affairs. The album's liner notes described the tracks as being "about love's many faces". Songs centered on the latter themes included "Strangers Nine to Five", "We Could" and "Nobody's Business". The title track was about how a couple is about to file to divorce before realizing they cannot part with their family dog.

== Release, critical reception, chart performance and singles ==
I'll Take the Dog was released by Capitol Records in November 1966. It was distributed as a vinyl LP offered in both mono and stereo formats. Six songs were included on the discs. I'll Take the Dog was met with favorable reviews. Cash Box magazine called the album a collection of "fine duet tracks", theorizing that they will do "a good bit of over-the-counter business with the package". Record World called the Shepard-Pillow a "click country duo" and described the album as "well-done" in their review. No formal review was provided from AllMusic, however, the publication rated it three out of five stars. The album reached number 19 on the US Billboard Top Country Albums survey. Its only single was the title track, which was first released by Capitol in April 1966. It reached number nine on the US Billboard Hot Country Songs chart in 1966.

== Track listing ==
Side one
No.	Title	Writer(s)	Length
1.	"I'll Take the Dog"	Margie Barton; Johnny MacRae	2:32
2.	"We Could"	Felice Bryant	2:35
3.	"Let's Be Different"	Don Rollings	2:27
4.	"Who in the World"	Bill Owens; Dolly Parton	2:34
5.	"The Corner of Despair"	Ray Griff	2:07
6.	"It Was Too Late"	Shirley Collie	2:04

Side two
No.	Title	Writer(s)	Length
1.	"Strangers Nine to Five"	Williams; Roberts; Turner	2:37
2.	"Lonely Together"	Bill Anderson	2:29
3.	"Willingly"	Hank Cochran	2:31
4.	"Put It Off Until Tomorrow"	Owens; Parton	2:43
5.	"I'd Fight the World"	Cochran; Joe Allison	2:36
6.	"Nobody's Business"	Axel Christensen	2:29

== Chart performance ==
Chart (1966)	Peak position
US Top Country Albums (Billboard)	19

== Release history ==
Region	Date	Format	Label	Ref.
North America	July 1966	Vinyl LP (Mono); Vinyl LP (Stereo)	Capitol Records	
Australia	1971	Vinyl LP (Stereo); Cassette	World Record Club/World Cassette Club	
