= Have Heart, Will Love =

Single by Jean Shepard
- B-side: "I'll Take the Blame"
- Released: January 1959
- Recorded: November 18, 1958
- Studio: Bradley Studios (Nashville, Tennessee)
- Genre: Country
- Length: 2:08
- Label: Capitol
- Songwriter(s): Sid Tepper; Roy C. Bennett
- Producer(s): Ken Nelson

Jean Shepard singles chronology
"I Want to Go Where No One Knows Me" (1958)	"Have Heart, Will Love" (1959)	"Jeopardy" (1959)

"Have Heart, Will Love" is a song written by Sid Tepper and Roy C. Bennett. It was originally recorded by American country singer Jean Shepard. Released as a single in 1959, it reached the top 30 of the US country chart.

== Background, recording, release and chart performance ==
In the 1950s, Jean Shepard was one of only a handful of female artists to break through the male-dominated country music industry. In the middle decade, she reached the US country top ten with "A Satisfied Mind", "Beautiful Lies" and "I Thought of You". Another charting single within the decade was 1958's "Have Heart, Will Love". The track was written by Sid Tepper and Roy C. Bennett. The song was recorded on November 18, 1958, at the Bradley Film and Recording Studio in Nashville, Tennessee. The session was produced by Ken Nelson. Three additional sides were cut at the same session.

"Have Heart, Will Love" was released in January 1959 by Capitol Records. It was distributed as a seven-inch vinyl single. The disc included a B-side titled "I'll Take the Blame". The song reached number 30 on the US Billboard country songs chart, becoming her sixth charting song and sixth top 40 single in her career. "Have Heart, Will Love" was only one of two charting singles Shepard had on the US country chart in the second half of the 1950s. Her previous single "I Want to Go Where No One Knows Me" also made the chart.

== Track listing ==
7" vinyl single

- "Have Heart, Will Love" – 2:08
- "I'll Take the Blame" – 2:18

== Charts ==
Weekly chart performance for "Have Heart, Will Love"
Chart (1959)	Peak position
US Hot Country Songs (Billboard)	30
