= I'll Take the Dog =

Single by Jean Shepard and Ray Pillow

from the album I'll Take the Dog
- B-side: "I'd Fight the World"
- Released: April 1966
- Recorded: January 1966
- Studio: Columbia (Nashville, Tennessee)
- Genre: Country
- Length: 2:32
- Label: Capitol
- Songwriter(s): Margie Barton; Johnny MacRae
- Producer(s): Marvin Hughes

Jean Shepard singles chronology
"Many Happy Hangovers to You" (1966)	"I'll Take the Dog" (1966)	"If Teardrops Were Silver" (1966)

Ray Pillow singles chronology
"Common Colds and Broken Hearts" (1966)	"I'll Take the Dog" (1966)	"Volkswagen" (1966)

"I'll Take the Dog" is a duet song by American country singers Jean Shepard and Ray Pillow. Released as a single, it reached the top ten of the US country songs chart in 1966. The song was described as a "comedy duet" centered on a couple about to divorce. It received a positive response from Record World magazine following its release and was included on the pair's album of the same name.

== Background, recording and content ==
Jean Shepard first found country music success in the 1950s and had 20 years of hit singles. This included "A Dear John Letter" (1953), "A Satisfied Mind" (1955) and "Second Fiddle (To an Old Guitar)" (1964). During the 1960s, she had 15 top 40 singles, which included a duet with Ray Pillow. Pillow was known as both a music publisher (working with Capitol Records) and as a musical artist. He had a top 20 single with 1965's "Thank You Ma'am" followed by several more chart records, among them his duet with Shepard. Described as a "comedy duet" by The New York Times, "I'll Take the Dog" tells the story of a couple who is about to file for divorce. Because they cannot choose which partner will take custody of their pet dog, they ultimately choose to stay married. It was written by Margie Barton and Johnny MacRae. The song was produced by Marvin Hughes in January 1966 at the Columbia Studios in Nashville, Tennessee.

== Release, critical reception and chart performance ==
"I'll Take the Dog" was released as a single by Capitol Records in April 1966. It was distributed as a seven-inch vinyl single. On its B-side was another duet between Pillow and Shepard titled "I'd Fight the World". The single was reviewed positively by Record World magazine which wrote, "Separated couple argues about who gets to keep the dog. Surprise ending will keep country folks happy. Duo delights." The single reached number ten on the US Billboard Hot Country Songs chart. It became Shepard's seventh single to place in the Billboard country top ten. It was Pillow's only top ten single and highest-charting on Billboard. Later the year it was included on the duo's studio album of the same name.

== Track listings ==
7" vinyl single

- "I'll Take the Dog" – 2:32
- "I'd Fight the World" – 2:36

== Charts ==
Weekly chart performance for "I'll Take the Dog"
Chart (1966)	Peak position
US Hot Country Songs (Billboard)	9
