= Many Happy Hangovers =

Studio album by Jean Shepard
- Released: July 1966
- Recorded: September–December 1965
- Studio: Columbia (Nashville, Tennessee)
- Genre: Country; honky tonk
- Label: Capitol
- Producer: Marvin Hughes

Jean Shepard chronology
It's a Man Every Time (1965)	Many Happy Hangovers (1966)	I'll Take the Dog (1966)

Singles from Many Happy Hangovers
- 1. "Many Happy Hangovers to You" Released: January 1966

Many Happy Hangovers is a studio album by American country singer Jean Shepard. It was released in July 1966 by Capitol Records and contained 12 tracks. The album's concept was centered on songs about an evening out followed by songs about the morning after. Among them was the album's title track. Released as a single, it reached the top 20 of the US country chart in 1966. The album was given a positive reception by Billboard, Cashbox and AllMusic.

== Background, recording and content ==
Jean Shepard first rose to commercial country music stardom in the 1950s, becoming known for her honky tonk style. This began with 1953's "A Dear John Letter" and was followed by 1955's "A Satisfied Mind", among others. For several years, her singles failed to chart until 1964's "Second Fiddle (To an Old Guitar)". The song reached the top ten and started a series of charting singles during the decade. Among them was the top 20 single "Many Happy Hangovers to You". The album it was included on would be named for her single.

Many Happy Hangovers was recorded at the Columbia Studios in Nashville, Tennessee between September and December 1965. The album project was produced by Marvin Hughes. A total of 12 tracks comprised the album. The liner notes described Many Happy Hangovers as being a collection of songs centered around an evening out, along with songs about the morning afterward. The songs were also a combination of "romantic ballads" and "no nonsense", according to the liner notes. Tracks on the album were composed by a variety of songwriters, including Jan Howard, Skeeter Davis, Harlan Howard and Don Bowman.

== Critical reception ==
Professional ratings
Review scores
Source	Rating
Allmusic	4/5 stars

Many Happy Hangovers received a positive response from critics and publication upon its release. Billboard described the album as a series of "excellent performances", highlighting the tracks "Day to Day" and "Our Past is in My Way". The publication concluded by calling it a "well produced country package" that will "quickly hit the charts". Cashbox named it among its "best bets" in its review. "The warm and winning personality of the songstress comes through loud and clear as she lets loose with a dozen ditties oriented toward shattered romance," the magazine wrote. AllMusic did not provide a written review, but rated the album four out of five stars.

== Release, chart performance and singles ==
Many Happy Hangovers was released in July 1966 by Capitol Records. It was the seventh studio album of Shepard's career. The label distributed the album as a vinyl LP, offered in both mono and stereo versions. Six songs were featured on each side of the disc. Many Happy Hangovers reached the number six position on the US Billboard Top Country Albums chart. Along with 1967's Heart, We Did All That We Could, the album was Shepard's highest-charting on the Billboard country albums survey. Both discs were her only two to reach the top ten there as well. The title track was the only single included on the disc. It was first released by Capitol Records in January 1966. Later that year, it reached the number 13 position on the US Billboard Hot Country Songs chart.

== Track listing ==
Side one
No.	Title	Writer(s)	Length
1.	"Many Happy Hangovers to You"	Johnny MacRae	2:27
2.	"Look What I've Got"	Don Bowman	2:09
3.	"Our Past Is in My Way"	Betty Sue Perry	2:44
4.	"How in the World"	Skeeter Davis	2:22
5.	"Your Name's Become a Household Word"	Neal Merritt	2:47
6.	"I Forgot to Care"	Harlan Howard	1:55

Side two
No.	Title	Writer(s)	Length
1.	"Wherever You Are"	Jan Howard; Richard Johnson	2:05
2.	"Dirt Under His Feet"	Jimmy Gateley	2:14
3.	"One Minute"	Gateley	2:16
4.	"Day to Day (Tear to Tear)"	Johnny Russell; Teddy Wilburn	2:15
5.	"You'd Still Find a Way to Cheat on Me"	Rhodes; Spears; Ebner	2:21
6.	"Wave Goodbye to Me"	Bowman; Jackson King	2:07

== Personnel ==
All credits are adapted from the liner notes of Many Happy Hangovers.

- Marvin Hughes – Producer
- Ken Veeder – Cover photo

== Chart performance ==
Chart (1966)	Peak position
US Top Country Albums (Billboard)	6

== Release history ==
Region	Date	Format	Label	Ref.
North America; United Kingdom	July 1966	Vinyl LP (Mono); Vinyl LP (Stereo)	Capitol Records	
Taiwan	July 1966	Vinyl LP (Stereo)	CSJ	
