= It's a Man Every Time =

Studio album by Jean Shepard
- Released: November 1965
- Recorded: October 1964–February 1965
- Studio: Columbia Studio
- Genre: Country
- Label: Capitol
- Producer: Marvin Hughes

Jean Shepard chronology
Lighthearted and Blue (1964)	It's a Man Every Time (1965)	Many Happy Hangovers (1966)

Singles from It's a Man Every Time
- 1. "It's a Man (Every Time It's a Man)" Released: September 1965

It's a Man Every Time is a studio album by American country singer Jean Shepard. It was released in November 1965 by Capitol Records and featured 12 tracks. The album's title track was its only single. It was given a positive reception by Billboard magazine following its release and was her second album to make the US country chart.

== Background, recording and content ==
Jean Shepard found success during the Honky-tonk era of country music during the 1950s. With the introduction of country pop, her career stalled in the later half of the decade. In 1963, her husband Hawkshaw Hawkins was killed in a plane crash. In 1964, she had a commercial comeback with the single "Second Fiddle (To an Old Guitar)". By this point, she became a regular performer on Bill Anderson's television show. In October 1965, Billboard announced that Shepard had recorded a new album and single.

It's a Man Every Time was recorded at the Columbia Studio in Nashville, Tennessee. Sessions were held between October 1964 and February 1965. The album was produced by Marvin Hughes and was Shepard's second album produced with him. The album contained a total of 12 tracks. Included was a song written by Johnny Cash and June Carter called "Ain't You Ashamed". Another song was composed by Conway Twitty titled "Let Me Be the Judge". The liner notes described the track "Billy Christian" as a song about "a gallivanting husband" and called the title track "plaintive elegance".

== Release, critical reception, chart performance and singles ==
Professional ratings
Review scores
Source	Rating
Allmusic	3/5 stars

It's a Man Every Time was released by Capitol Records in November 1965. It was the sixth studio album of Shepard's career. The label distributed the album as a vinyl LP, offered in both mono and stereo formats. Six songs were included on either side of the disc. Billboard gave the album a positive response in November 1965, calling the songs "pleasurable" and "the kind of songs she's made famous and which made her famous". AllMusic did not provide a written review but rated it three out of five stars. It's a Man Every Time was Shepard's second album to make the US Billboard Top Country Albums chart. Following its release, it reached the number 19 position on the chart. The album's only single was its title track, which was issued by Capitol in September 1965.

== Track listing ==
Side one
No.	Title	Writer(s)	Length
1.	"Too Many Teardrops Too Late"	Dave Burges	2:21
2.	"Yesterday's Best"	Barbara Day	2:25
3.	"Ain't You Ashamed"	Johnny Cash; June Carter	2:20
4.	"Bitter Tears"	Jimmy Hall	2:40
5.	"Too Broke to Break"	J. Russell; V. Morrison	2:38
6.	"Billy Christian"	Thomas Hall	1:46

Side two
No.	Title	Writer(s)	Length
1.	"I've Got My Pride"	Harlan Howard	2:08
2.	"It's a Man (Every Time It's a Man)"	Dubin; Dash; McHugh	2:20
3.	"More to Love Than This"	Hank Mills	2:17
4.	"Let Me Be the Judge"	Conway Twitty	2:41
5.	"I Love You More and More Every Day"	Don Robertson	2:32
6.	"Franklin County Moonshine"	Betty Amos	2:37

== Chart performance ==
Chart (1965)	Peak position
US Top Country Albums (Billboard)	19

== Release history ==
Region	Date	Format	Label	Ref.
North America; United Kingdom	November 1965	Vinyl LP (Mono); Vinyl LP (Stereo)	Capitol Records	
