= A Tear Dropped By =

Single by Jean Shepard

from the album Heart, We Did All That We Could
- B-side: "He Plays the Bongo (I Play the Banjo)"
- Released: October 1964
- Recorded: January 27, 1964
- Studio: Columbia (Nashville, Tennessee)
- Genre: Country
- Length: 2:20
- Label: Capitol
- Songwriter(s): Larry Lee; Rusty Adams
- Producer(s): Marvin Hughes

Jean Shepard singles chronology
"Second Fiddle (To an Old Guitar)" (1964)	"A Tear Dropped By" (1964)	"Someone's Gotta Cry" (1965)

"A Tear Dropped By" is a song originally recorded by American country singer Jean Shepard. Composed by Larry Lee and Rusty Adams, it was released as a single in 1964, reaching the top 40 of the US country chart that year. It was one of 30 top 40 singles Shepard had in her career. It was given positive reviews from critics following its release.

== Background, content and recording ==
Jean Shepard first found success in the 1950s honky tonk era of country music with top ten singles like "A Satisfied Mind" and "Beautiful Lies". As the decade progressed and honky tonk fell out of fashion, Shepard's popularity declined. Then in 1964, she had a comeback with the top te single "Second Fiddle (To an Old Guitar)". This would start a series of chart singles for Shepard during the 1960s. "A Tear Dropped By" was among her charting singles that followed. Composed by Larry Lee and Rusty Adams, the song was described by Cash Box as a "weeper". It was recorded on August 29, 1963, at the Columbia Studios in Nashville, Tennessee. The session was produced by Marvin Hughes. Three additional sides were cut at the same session.

== Release, critical reception and chart performance ==
"A Tear Dropped By" was issued as a single by Capitol Records in October 1964. It was distributed as a seven-inch vinyl record, with "He Plays the Bongo (I Play the Banjo)" on the B-side. Billboard magazine praised the song, commenting, "Tender ballad in fine Shepard style. Plenty of sales potential. Fans will be happy to have her back." Cash Box found the song to have "a real pretty chorus" combined with "an infectious repeating melodic riff." "A Tear Dropped By" rose into the top 40 of the US Billboard Hot Country Songs chart, peaking at the number 38 position. It was one of 30 singles by Shepard to reach the country top 40 in her career. It was eventually included on her 1967 studio album Heart, We Did All That We Could.

== Track listings ==
7" vinyl single

- "A Tear Dropped By" – 2:20
- "He Plays the Bongo (I Play the Banjo)" – 2:01

== Charts ==
Weekly chart performance for "A Tear Dropped By"
Chart (1964)	Peak position
US Hot Country Songs (Billboard)	38
