= Country Bear Jamboree =

Attraction at Disney theme parks

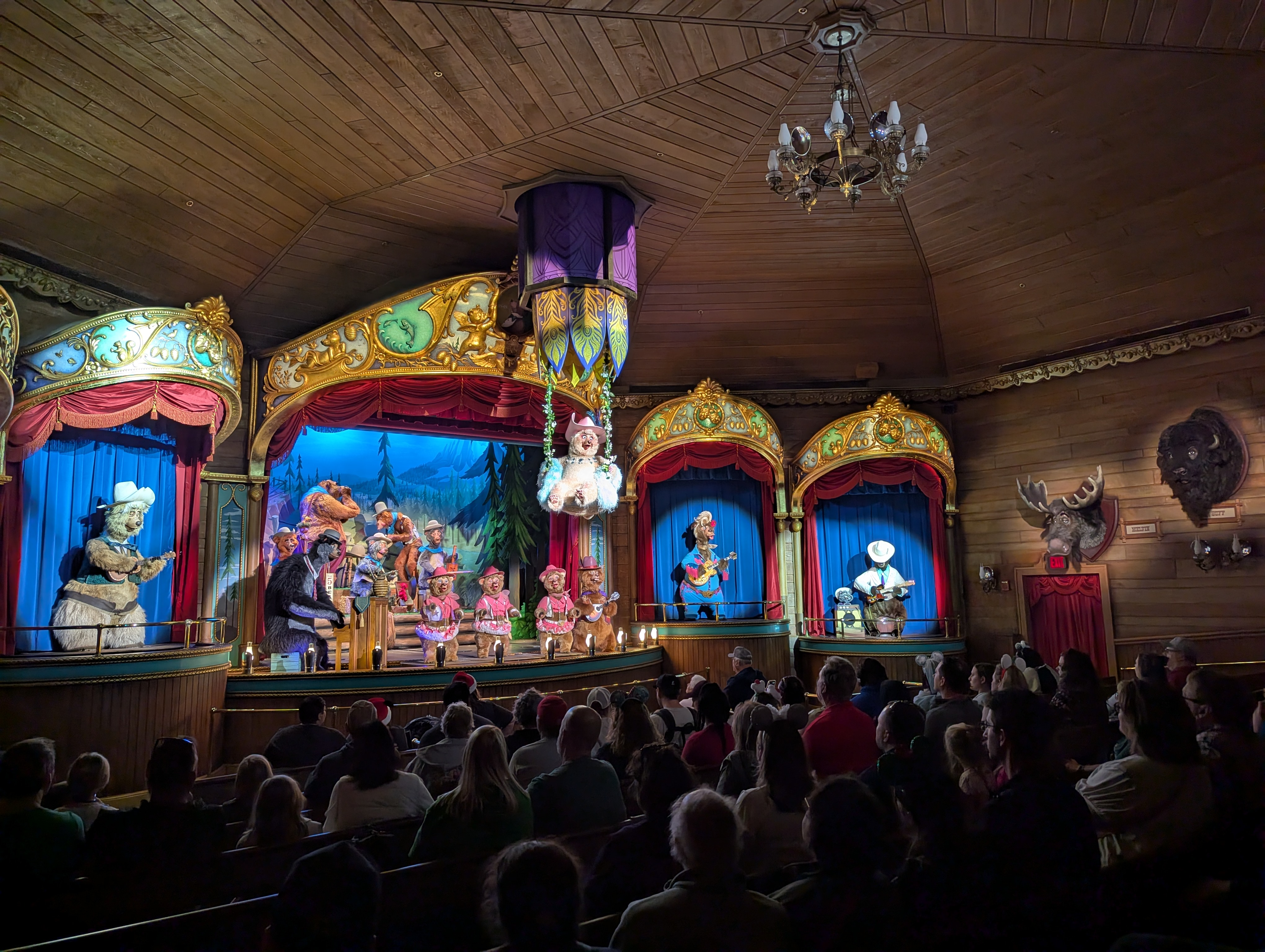
- Country Bear Musical Jamboree at Walt Disney World

Magic Kingdom
- Name: Country Bear Musical Jamboree
- Area: Frontierland
- Status: Operating
- Soft opening date: July 10, 2024 (Musical Jamboree)
- Opening date: October 1, 1971 (Original); July 17, 2024 (Musical Jamboree)
- Closing date: January 27, 2024 (Original)

Disneyland
- Name: Country Bear Playhouse
- Area: Bear Country (1972–1988); Critter Country (1988–2001)
- Status: Removed
- Opening date: March 4, 1972
- Closing date: September 9, 2001
- Replaced by: The Many Adventures of Winnie the Pooh

Tokyo Disneyland
- Name: Country Bear Theater
- Area: Westernland
- Status: Operating
- Opening date: April 15, 1983

Ride statistics
- Attraction type: Audio-Animatronic theater presentation
- Designer: WED Enterprises
- Model: Music hall
- Theme: Country music
- Music: George Bruns
- Duration: 15:55
- Show host: Henry the Bear
- Audio-animatronics: 24 (Magic Kingdom); 48 (Disneyland); 52 (Tokyo Disneyland)
- Sponsors: Pepsi and Frito-Lay (Magic Kingdom, 1971–81); Wonder Bread (Disneyland, 1975–1995); House Foods (Tokyo Disneyland)
- Wheelchair accessible
- Assistive listening available
- Closed captioning available

The Country Bear Jamboree (also known as the Country Bear Musical Jamboree and the Country Bear Theater, and previously known as the Country Bear Playhouse) is an attraction in the Magic Kingdom theme park at the Walt Disney World Resort, Tokyo Disneyland at Tokyo Disney Resort, and formerly at Disneyland Park at the Disneyland Resort.

The attraction is a stage show featuring audio-animatronic figures. Most of the characters are bears who perform country music. Characters rise up to the stage on platforms, descend from the ceiling, and appear from behind curtains. The theater includes three audio-animatronic animal heads mounted on the walls who interact with characters on stage.

Due to popularity, The Country Bear Jamboree was given a two "spin-off" shows. One was called The Country Bear Christmas Special, which appeared during the 1984 winter season at Walt Disney World and Disneyland. In 1986, another show was a summertime version called The Country Bear Vacation Hoedown. This version was so popular at Disneyland that it became the park's standard edition until the attraction's closing in 2001. A film based on the attraction, The Country Bears, was released in 2002.

== History ==
The Country Bear Jamboree was originally intended by Walt Disney to be placed at Disney's Mineral King Ski Resort in California which he was trying to build in the mid-1960's. Disney knew he wanted some sort of show to provide entertainment to the guests at the resort, and he knew he wanted the show to feature some sort of bear band. The project was assigned to imagineer Marc Davis.

Davis, together with Al Bertino, came up with many bear groups, including bear marching bands, bear mariachi bands, and Dixieland bears.

After Disney's death, plans for the show moved forward. The bears would be featured in the resort's Bear Band Restaurant Show, and it was decided that they would have a country twang. But while plans for the show progressed, plans for the ski resort did not. Instead, the Imagineers working on the project decided to place the show in Walt Disney World's Magic Kingdom in time for its grand opening in 1971. Imagineer X Atencio and musical director George Bruns created songs for the bears to sing.

On October 1, 1971, The Country Bear Jamboree opened its doors in the Magic Kingdom at Walt Disney World. It received so much positive feedback that Imagineers immediately planned to make a replica of the show to be placed in Disneyland. The addition to the show in Disneyland inspired a brand-new land appropriately titled Bear Country. Because of the tremendous popularity of the show in Walt Disney World, excess capacity was added to the Disneyland incarnation in the form of two identical theaters, each housing a copy of the show in its entirety. The Disneyland clone of the attraction opened on March 4, 1972.

Due to the huge popularity of the Disneyland and Magic Kingdom versions a third version of the attraction was planned to open at Tokyo Disneyland on April 15, 1983. The Tokyo version also houses two identical theaters, like the Disneyland version. However, unlike Disneyland, the trophy heads of Max, Buff and Melvin hang on the right side of both identical theaters (in the same arrangement as Magic Kingdom's).

On August 24, 2001, it was announced that the Disneyland location would close on September 9 to make room for The Many Adventures of Winnie the Pooh.

On August 21, 2012, the Walt Disney World version of the Country Bear Jamboree closed for a nearly two-month-long refurbishment. All the characters in the show received new skin, fur, and costumes. The songs "Pretty Little Devilish Mary" and "Fractured Folk Song" and some of the dialogues were removed, while some of the other songs were shortened. The show was 4 to 5 minutes shorter than it was before. The shorter version of the show opened on October 17, 2012.

In September 2023, it was announced that the Walt Disney World version would receive a new show titled the Country Bear Musical Jamboree. In June 2024, Magic Kingdom announced that Country Bear Musical Jamboree would open on July 17, 2024.

== Characters ==
=== Bears ===
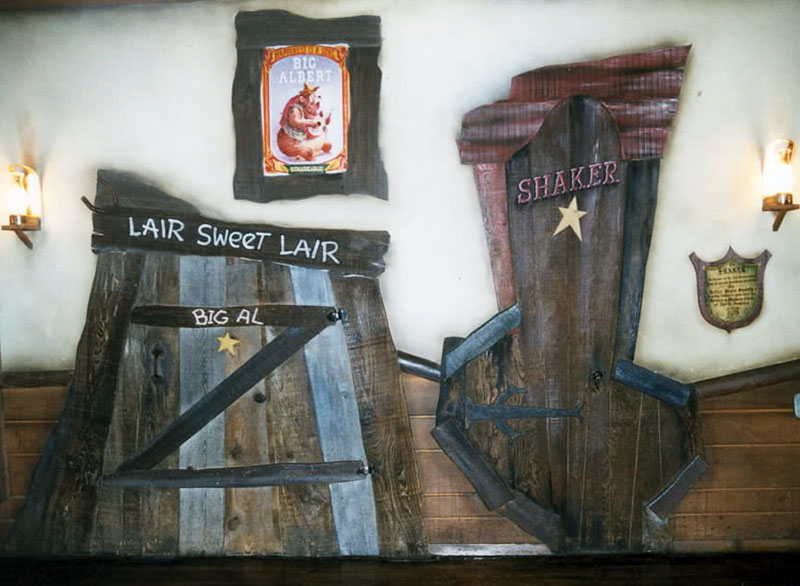
The queue for the Disneyland version included fake doors in appropriate shapes for each of the bear performers.

Henry – The Master of Ceremonies of the show, Henry is a welcoming and friendly brown bear. He wears a grey top hat, starched shirt front, and a string tie. In some parts of the show, he plays a yellow guitar. It is implied that he and Teddi have some sort of backstage romance. In addition to being the leader of all the bears, he is often depicted with Wendell and Sammy the Raccoon as his sidekicks. He is the grandson of Ursus H. Bear, who founded Grizzly Hall, the venue the bears perform at in Florida.

Gomer – Gomer is a bear who never sings but instead plays his piano, which has a honeycomb on top of it. He is considered Henry's right-hand bear. He is a brown bear that occasionally is shown wearing a collar or a tie.

The Five Bear Rugs

- Zeke – Considered the leader of The Five Bear Rugs, Zeke plays a banjo and taps on the dishpan with "a real ol' country beat". He is a grey bear with glasses who wears a tan top hat. He was voiced by Dallas McKennon from October 1971 until July 1975, when Randy Sparks rerecorded his vocals. McKennon's recording as Zeke can still be heard on the 1971 record and the 2003 CD. Zeke's solo song "Pretty Little Devilish Mary" was removed from the Walt Disney World version of the show in October 2012.
- Zeb – Zeb is a brown bear with a light brown stomach. He plays the fiddle as well as wears a bandanna around his neck and a derby hat. His wife models fur coats — always the same one — at a nearby boutique, which is why their son Baby Oscar travels with the band.
- Brother Ted – Ted is a tall, skinny bear who blows on the corn jug and plays the washboard. His fur is brown, and he wears a vest with a brown hat.
- Big Fred – The biggest of the five bears, Fred ironically plays the smallest instrument: a harmonica. He is a brown bear and wears blue jeans held up with suspenders as well as a striped red and white tie.
- Tennessee Bear – Tennessee plays "The Thing" (an upright bass with only one string and a tiny mechanical bird sitting on it). He is blonde bear (brown in Tokyo Disneyland) and wears a bandanna around his neck.

Baby Oscar – Oscar appears with The Five Bear Rugs, but plays no instrument, though in the original show he would "beep" his teddy bear twice at the end of a few songs. In fact, he never says a word. He is a brown bear and always has his teddy bear to keep him company. In the 1971 album, it is mentioned that Zeb is his father.

Wendell – Wendell is a hyperactive golden brown bear who plays the mandolin. He wears a blue bandanna around his neck and a light brown hat. He also has a massive overbite and buck teeth. Wendell was originally portrayed as Henry's sidekick, having two duets with him. Wendell's role in the Walt Disney World version of the show was severely reduced during the October 2012 refurbishment when "Fractured Folk Song" was removed, and is no longer mentioned by name. In the Country Bear Vacation Hoedown, Wendell's vacation photos imply he has a wife and son.

Romeo McGrowl (originally named Liver Lips McGrowl) – He is a brown bear with big lips and plays the guitar. He got his original name, Liver Lips, due to his large pronounced lips, meant to caricature musicians who "croon." In September 2023, it was revealed that he would be renamed Romeo McGrowl when the attraction was rethemed to Country Bear Musical Jamboree in Magic Kingdom. Henry often calls Romeo "Mac", a nickname based on his last name. His original name continues to be used by Tokyo Disneyland in their Japanese Country Bear Jamboree, Jingle Bell Jamboree, and Vacation Jamboree shows.

Trixie – Trixie is a very large brown bear who wears a blue bow on her head, a blue tutu around her waist, and holds a blue handkerchief in her left hand. It is also implied that she has a slight crush on Henry.

Terrence (nicknamed "the Shaker") – A tall bear with tan fur, Terrence wears a hat and plays the guitar. He gets his nickname from his signature dance move where he sways his hips back and forth. The original animatronic achieved this effect by shaking the entire platform Terrence was on at the base, causing the curtains to shake violently as well. The Disneyland and Tokyo Disneyland versions of Terrence added an independent hip-swaying mechanic separate from Terrence's legs and torso, allowing the hips to sway much further without shaking the entire animatronic's base.

The Sun Bonnet Trio

- Bunny – Bunny stands in the center of the stage. Because she and her sisters are triplets, they all have brown fur and wear matching blue bonnets and dresses.
- Bubbles – Bubbles stands to the audience's left between Gomer and Bunny.
- Beulah – Beulah stands to the audience's right between Bunny and Wendell.

Ernest the "Dude" – Ernest is a brown bear who plays the fiddle. His nickname, "Dude", refers to his dandy appearance and personality, and is used in the context of the original definition of "dude" (a city dweller unfamiliar with life on the range). Ernest always takes his entire 17-trunk wardrobe everywhere he goes. He wears a derby and a red polka-dot bow tie around his neck. He was voiced by Van Stoneman from October 1971 until July 1975, when his vocals were rerecorded by Randy Sparks. Stoneman's recording can still be heard on the 1971 record and 2003 CD.

Teddi Barra – Teddi Barra is a unique bear because she never appears on stage. Instead she descends from a hole in the ceiling on her swing, which is decorated with pink roses. She is a brown bear and wears a blue hat with a pink feather as well as a long pink boa around her neck. She is implied to have a backstage romance with Henry.

Big Al – Big Al is the biggest bear. He is grey with a light grey belly and wears a tan hat and a red vest. He plays an always out-of-tune guitar.

Rufus – Rufus is in charge of changing the scenery and the lights. He is never seen, only his loud footsteps and his heavy breathing as he climbs the stairs to fix something that has gone wrong are heard. While he is not heard or mentioned in the original version of the show, he is heard and mentioned in all subsequent versions.

Ursus H. Bear – Ursus H. Bear was the founder of Grizzly Hall. He lived from 1848 to 1928, having passed before the time of the original show. The center stage proscenium of Grizzly Hall features a plaque decorated with a Victorian style portrait of Ursus, dedicated to his legacy. In the Country Bear Musical Jamboree, it was revealed that Henry is his grandson (identically resembling Ursus in appearance).

=== Other animals ===
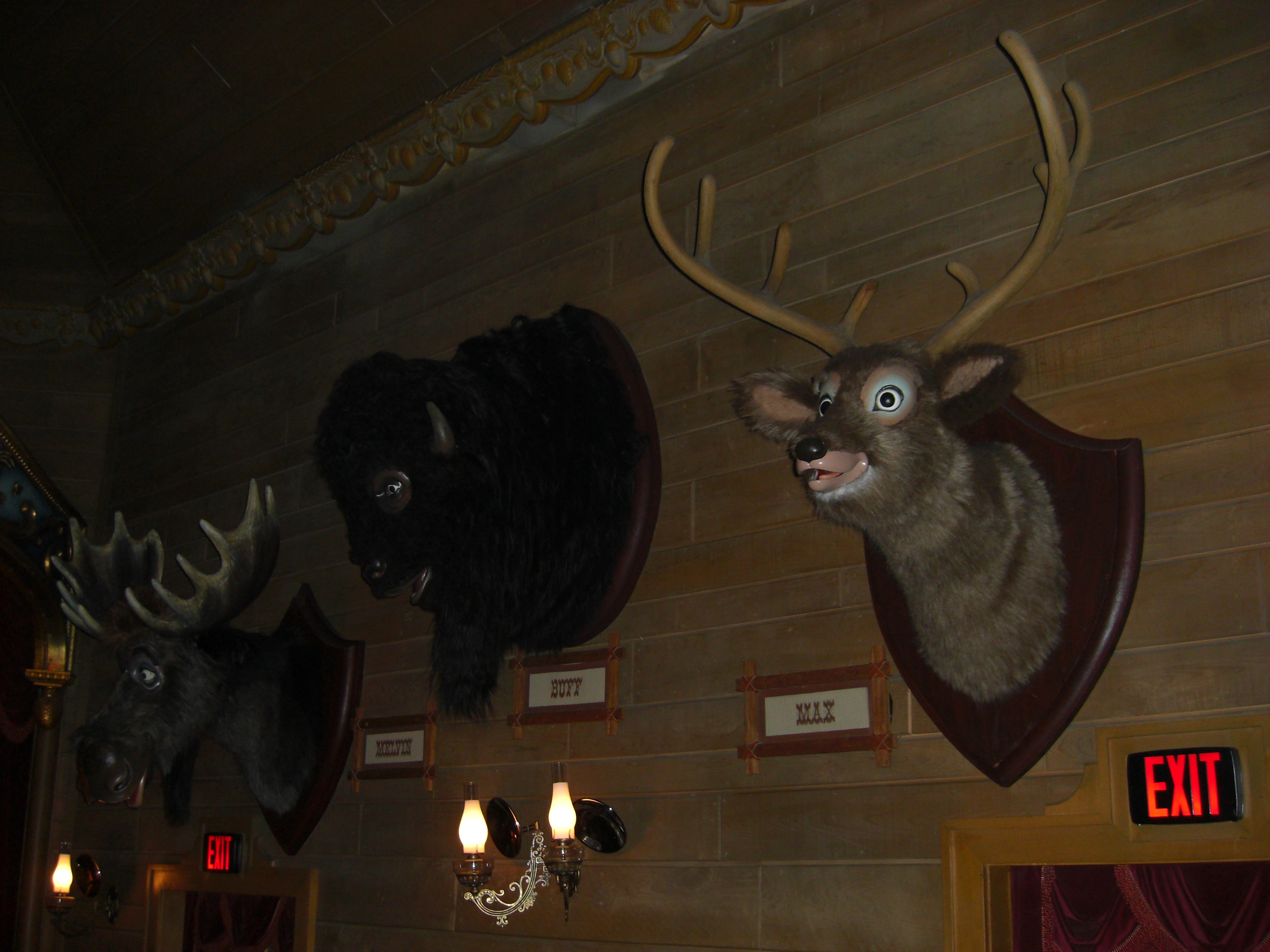
Melvin, Buff, and Max (left to right) at the Walt Disney World Country Bear Jamboree

Buff – Buff is considered the leader of the mounted animal heads and is also the largest. He is the head portion of an American bison.

Max – Max is the head portion of a whitetail buck.

Melvin – Melvin, the head portion of a bull moose, is one of the animal head trio. He often makes well meaning jokes.

At Disneyland, Max, Buff, and Melvin currently reside in The Many Adventures of Winnie the Pooh, which replaced the Country Bear Playhouse in 2003 (which had closed nearly two years prior). They hang above the entrance to the "Hunny Heaven" room, but riders must turn around in order to see them. The set of Max, Buff & Melvin featured there were the static non-animatronic figures found in Mile Long Bar.

At the Magic Kingdom and Tokyo Disneyland the three trophy heads of Max, Buff and Melvin hung on the right side of the theater. At Disneyland, the configuration was flipped, with the three being hung on the left side.

Sammy – Sammy is Henry's raccoon pal who cuddles around Henry's top hat. He acts like a coonskin cap for Henry. In the Country Bear Vacation Hoedown, Sammy gets replaced by a skunk named Randy. In the Musical Jamboree, Sammy peeks out from behind a speaker instead of being on Henry's hat.

Randy – A skunk who appears in the Vacation Hoedown version of the show. At several points during the show, guests can hear some of the bears yelling about a skunk that got backstage, and eventually Randy finds himself on top of Henry's head. When confronted, Randy says he simply wanted to get into show business, and Henry invites him to join in the show's finale. In the Tokyo Disneyland version of the show, he is named "Sunny."

Webster – A penguin who appears in the Country Bear Christmas Special alongside Terrence. In the Walt Disney World and Disneyland versions of the show, Webster is frozen in a block of ice and does not speak, instead just rattling around every now and then as Terrence asks him to sing. In the Tokyo Disneyland version, Webster is thawed out and sings with Terrence.

Dolores – Another animal companion to Terrence, Dolores the octopus is found in the Country Bear Vacation Hoedown. She has a relationship with Terrence, but in the Walt Disney World and Disneyland versions of the show, it does not work out. In the Tokyo Disneyland version, she is a more cartoon-like octopus as opposed to the original realistic design, and she sings a song with Terrence. The American version of Dolores can be seen in the queue for Guardians of the Galaxy – Mission: Breakout! at Disney California Adventure park.

=== Voice actors ===
Note: List does not include Gomer, Ted, Fred, and Baby Oscar, as they never speak in any of the shows. Also, list doesn't currently include Japanese voice actors.

==== Original English voices ====
Character	Country Bear Jamboree	Country Bear Christmas Special	Country Bear Vacation Hoedown	Country Bear Musical Jamboree
Henry	Peter Renaday	Peter Renaday	Peter Renaday	A. J. LoCascio
Buff	Thurl Ravenscroft	Thurl Ravenscroft	Thurl Ravenscroft	Fred Tatasciore
Max	Peter Renaday	Mike West	Mike West	Steven French
Melvin	Bill Lee	Frank Welker	Frank Welker	Roger Craig Smith
Zeke	Dallas McKennon (1971–1975), Randy Sparks (1975–2024)	Harry Middlebrooks	Harry Middlebrooks	David Loucks
Zeb	Unknown Member of the Stoneman Family	Curt Wilson	Curt Wilson	Trey Keller
Tennessee	Unknown Member of the Stoneman Family	Lee Dresser	Lee Dresser	Dylan Gentile
Wendell	Bill Cole	Dave Durham	Dave Durham	Chris Thile
Liver Lips / Romeo McGrowl	Jimmy Stoneman	Dave Durham	Dave Durham	Robert "Big Sandy" Williams
Trixie	Cheryl Poole	Suzanne Sherwin	Suzanne Sherwin	Emily Ann Roberts
Terrence (aka Shaker)	Van Stoneman	Harry Middlebrooks	Harry Middlebrooks	Mac McAnally
Bunny	Jackie Ward	Lori Johnson	Lori Johnson	Tania Hancheroff
Bubbles	Loulie Jean Norman	Diane Michelle	Diane Michelle	Rachel Robinson
Beulah	Peggy Clark	Holaday Mason	Holaday Mason	Cindy R. Walker
Ernest the "Dude"	Van Stoneman (1971–1975), Randy Sparks (1975–2024)	Mike Weston	Mike Weston	No Vocals - Fiddling Performed by Larry Franklin
Teddi Barra	Patsy Stoneman	Genia Fuller Crews	Genia Fuller Crews	Allison Russell
Big Al	Tex Ritter	Peter Klimes	Peter Klimes	N/A
Sammy	Bill Cole	Bob Gardner		Isaac Robinson-Smith
Randy			Frank Welker	
Rufus		N/A	N/A	Fred Tatasciore

== Synopsis ==
The show is a continuous string of short country songs sung by the various bears. As each bear sings their song, a curtain opens to reveal them, except in the case of Wendell, Gomer, and the Sun Bonnet Trio (all of whom rise from the center stage), and Teddi Barra (who descends from the ceiling).

The set list for the Tokyo Disneyland version is the original set list for the Walt Disney World and Disneyland versions when the show first opened at both those respective parks. The Disneyland version remained unchanged until 1985 when it converted over to the Vacation Hoedown the next year. The Walt Disney World version remained unchanged until its 2012 refurbishment, when the set list was altered.

=== Songs ===
==== Walt Disney World (1971–2012) & Disneyland (1972–1985) Version ====
- "Pianjo" (Don Robertson) – Gomer and Henry
- "Bear Band Serenade" (Lyrics: Xavier Atencio, Music: George Bruns) – The Five Bear Rugs, Gomer, and Henry
- "Fractured Folk Song" (Kenneth C. Burns & Henry D. Haynes) – Henry and Wendell
- "My Woman Ain't Pretty (But She Don't Swear None)" (Frankie Starr & Paul E. Miller) – Liver Lips McGrowl
- "Mama, Don't Whip Little Buford" (Burns & Haynes) – Henry and Wendell
- "Tears Will Be the Chaser For Your Wine" (Dale Davis & Leroy Goates) – Gomer and Trixie
- "Pretty Little Devilish Mary" (Bradley Kincaid) – The Five Bear Rugs
- "How Long Will My Baby Be Gone" (Buck Owens) – Terrence
- "All the Guys That Turn Me On Turn Me Down" (Plott & Powell) – The Sun Bonnet Trio
- "If You Can't Bite, Don't Growl" (Tommy Collins) – Ernest and the Five Bear Rugs
- "Heart, We Did All That We Could" (Ned Miller) – Teddi Barra
- "Blood on the Saddle" (Everett Cheetham) – Big Al
- "The Ballad of Davy Crockett" (Tom Blackburn and George Bruns) – Henry and Sammy
- "Ole Slew Foot" (Howard Hausey) – Cast (minus Ernest and Trixie, who do not appear onstage, and Big Al, who reprises "Blood on the Saddle")
- "Come Again" (Tom Adair & George Bruns) – Henry, Sammy, Melvin, Max, and Buff

==== Walt Disney World (2012–2024) Version ====
- "Pianjo" (Don Robertson) – Gomer and Henry
- "Bear Band Serenade" (Lyrics: Xavier Atencio, Music: George Bruns) – The Five Bear Rugs, Gomer, and Henry
- "If You Can't Bite, Don't Growl" (Tommy Collins) – Ernest and the Five Bear Rugs
- "My Woman Ain't Pretty (But She Don't Swear None)" (Frankie Starr & Paul E. Miller) – Liver Lips McGrowl
- "Mama, Don't Whip Little Buford" (Burns & Haynes) – Henry and Wendell
- "Tears Will Be the Chaser For Your Wine" (Dale Davis & Leroy Goates) – Gomer and Trixie
- "How Long Will My Baby Be Gone" (Buck Owens) – Terrence
- "All the Guys That Turn Me On Turn Me Down" (Plott & Powell) – The Sun Bonnet Trio
- "Heart, We Did All That We Could" (Ned Miller) – Teddi Barra
- "Blood on the Saddle" (Everett Cheetham) – Big Al
- "The Ballad of Davy Crockett" (Tom Blackburn and George Bruns) – Henry and Sammy
- "Ole Slew Foot" (Howard Hausey) – Cast (minus Ernest and Trixie, who do not appear onstage, and Big Al, who reprises "Blood on the Saddle")
- "Come Again" (Tom Adair & George Bruns) – Henry, Sammy, Melvin, Max, and Buff

==== Tokyo Disneyland (1983-present) Version ====
- "Pianjo" (Don Robertson) – Gomer and Henry
- "Bear Band Serenade" (Lyrics: Xavier Atencio, Music: George Bruns) – The Five Bear Rugs, Gomer, and Henry (sung in Japanese)
- "Fractured Folk Song" (Kenneth C. Burns & Henry D. Haynes) – Henry and Wendell (sung in Japanese)
- "My Woman Ain't Pretty (But She Don't Swear None)" (Frankie Starr & Paul E. Miller) – Liver Lips McGrowl
- "Mama, Don't Whip Little Buford" (Burns & Haynes) – Henry and Wendell (sung in Japanese)
- "Tears Will Be the Chaser For Your Wine" (Dale Davis & Leroy Goates) – Gomer and Trixie
- "Pretty Little Devilish Mary" (Bradley Kincaid) – The Five Bear Rugs
- "How Long Will My Baby Be Gone" (Buck Owens) – Terrence
- "All the Guys That Turn Me On Turn Me Down" (Plott & Powell) – The Sun Bonnet Trio
- "If You Can't Bite, Don't Growl" (Tommy Collins) – Ernest and the Five Bear Rugs
- "Heart, We Did All That We Could" (Ned Miller) – Teddi Barra
- "Blood on the Saddle" (Everett Cheetham) – Big Al
- "The Ballad of Davy Crockett" (Tom Blackburn and George Bruns) – Henry and Sammy (sung in Japanese)
- "Ole Slew Foot" (Howard Hausey) – Cast (minus Ernest and Trixie, who do not appear onstage, and Big Al, who reprises "Blood on the Saddle")
- "Come Again" (Tom Adair & George Bruns) – Henry, Sammy, Melvin, Max, and Buff (sung in Japanese)

== Christmas Special ==
In 1984, the Disney Imagineers created the Country Bear Christmas Special. The show debuted at Disneyland at the Disneyland Resort and at Magic Kingdom at the Walt Disney World Resort in the winter of 1984, while marking the first time an attraction at any Disney theme park to ever receive a seasonal overlay. The show later premiered at Tokyo Disneyland at the Tokyo Disney Resort as the Country Bear Jingle Bell Jamboree during the 1988 Christmas season.

The Disneyland version continued to play every holiday season with its last show playing in 2000 before the attraction closed permanently, while the Walt Disney World version continued to play every holiday season until 2005.

=== Songs ===
==== Walt Disney World (1984-2005) & Disneyland (1984-2000) ====
- "It's Beginning to Look a Lot Like Christmas" - Gomer and Henry
- "Tracks in the Snow" - Henry and the Five Bear Rugs
- "Oh, What a Christmas" - Wendell
- "Hibernation Blues" - Trixie
- "Deck the Halls" - The Five Bear Rugs
- "Rock & Roll Santa" - Liver Lips McGrowl and Gomer
- "Blue Christmas" - Terrence
- "Sleigh Ride" - The Sun Bonnet Trio, Melvin, Max, and Buff
- "Hungry as a Bear" - Ernest and the Five Bear Rugs
- "The Christmas Song" - Teddi Barra and Henry
- "Another New Year" - Big Al
- "Let It Snow! Let It Snow! Let It Snow!" - Henry, Sammy, and the Sun Bonnet Trio
- "Rudolph, the Red-Nosed Reindeer" - Melvin, Max, and Buff
- "Winter Wonderland" - Cast (minus Ernest and Trixie, who do not appear onstage)

==== Tokyo Disneyland (1988-present) Version ====
- "Jingle Bells" - Gomer and Henry (sung in English)
- "Tracks in the Snow" - Henry and the Five Bear Rugs
- "Oh, What a Christmas" - Wendell
- "Have Yourself a Merry Little Christmas" - Trixie (sung in English)
- "Deck the Halls" - The Five Bear Rugs
- "Rock & Roll Santa" - Liver Lips McGrowl and Gomer
- "Blue Christmas" - Terrence
- "Sleigh Ride" - The Sun Bonnet Trio, Melvin, Max, and Buff
- "Hungry as a Bear" - Ernest and the Five Bear Rugs
- "The Christmas Song" - Teddi Barra and Henry
- "Auld Lang Syne" - Big Al (sung in English)
- "Santa Claus is Coming to Town" - Henry, Sammy, and the Sun Bonnet Trio (sung in English)
- "Rudolph the Red-Nosed Reindeer" - Melvin, Max, and Buff
- "Winter Wonderland" - Cast (minus Ernest and Trixie, who do not appear onstage)

== Vacation Hoedown ==
The Country Bear Vacation Hoedown was a summer overlay for the attraction. In Disneyland, it opened in February 1986 replacing the original show. That May, the Magic Kingdom version followed suit. On July 15, 1994, the show opened at Tokyo Disneyland as the Country Bear Vacation Jamboree. It remained at Magic Kingdom until February 1992 when the original show returned. At Disneyland however, the Hoedown remained until the Country Bear Playhouse closed on September 9, 2001.

=== Songs ===
==== Walt Disney World (1986-1992) & Disneyland (1986-2001) Version ====
- "The Great Outdoors" – The Five Bear Rugs and Henry
- "Life's No Picnic Without You" – Trixie
- "On the Road Again" – Wendell
- "We Can Make It to the Top" – Liver Lips McGrowl
- "California Bears" – The Sunbonnet Trio, Gomer, Melvin, Max, and Buff
- "Two Different Worlds" – Terrence
- "Rocky Top" – The Five Bear Rugs
- "Nature" – Ernest
- "Singing in the Rain" – Teddi Barra and Henry
- "Ghost Riders in the Sky" – The Five Bear Rugs
- "I Lost My Way to Your Heart" – Big Al
- "Thank God I'm a Country Bear" – Cast (minus Ernest and Trixie, who do not appear onstage)

==== Tokyo Disneyland (1994-present) Version ====
- "The Great Outdoors" – The Five Bear Rugs and Henry
- "On the Road Again" – Wendell
- "Achy Breaky Heart" – Trixie
- "Over My Head Over You" – Terrence
- "California Bears" – The Sunbonnet Trio, Gomer, Melvin, Max, and Buff
- "We Can Make It to the Top" – Liver Lips McGrowl and the Sunbonnet Trio
- "Singing in the Rain" – Teddi Barra and Henry
- "Mountain Music" – Ernest, Henry, and the Five Bear Rugs
- "I've Been Working on the Railroad" – Big Al
- "V-A-C-A-T-I-O-N" – Cast (minus Ernest and Trixie, who do not appear onstage)

== Musical Jamboree ==
On September 9, 2023, it was announced at Disney's Destination D23 event that the Walt Disney World version of the show would receive an overhaul. The new Country Bear Musical Jamboree is inspired by Nashville musical revues, with the bears performing classic Disney songs, including "The Bare Necessities", reinterpreted in various genres of country music. A soft opening preview was held on July 10, 2024. It officially opened on July 17, 2024.

=== Songs ===
- "Country Bear Musical Jamboree" – The Five Bear Rugs with Henry, Melvin, Max, and Buff
- "Try Everything" from Zootopia (Sia Furler, Tor Hermansen & Mikkel Eriksen) – Trixie with the Sun Bonnet Trio
- "Kiss the Girl" from The Little Mermaid (Alan Menken & Howard Ashman) – Romeo McGrowl with Henry, Melvin, Max, and Buff
- "Supercalifragilisticexpialidocious" (instrumental) (Robert Sherman & Richard Sherman) from Mary Poppins – Ernest
- "A Whole New World" from Aladdin (Alan Menken & Tim Rice) – Gomer, Wendell and Teddi Barra
- "Fixer Upper" from Frozen (Kristen Anderson-Lopez & Robert Lopez) – Terrence with Henry, Melvin, Max, and Buff
- "Remember Me" from Coco (Kristen Anderson-Lopez & Robert Lopez) – Big Al (Voice actor unknown)
- "You've Got a Friend in Me" from Toy Story (Randy Newman) – Henry and Sammy with Melvin, Max, and Buff
- "The Bare Necessities" from The Jungle Book (Terry Gilkyson) – Cast (minus Big Al, Ernest, and Trixie, who do not appear onstage)
- "Remember Me" from Coco – Big Al (brief reprise)
- "Come Again" from Country Bear Jamboree (Tom Adair & George Bruns) – Henry, Sammy, Melvin, Max, and Buff

== Feature film ==
In 2002, Walt Disney Pictures released a live-action feature film based on the attraction, starring Christopher Walken, Daryl Mitchell, Diedrich Bader, Alex Rocco, and Haley Joel Osment as the voice of Beary Barrington. It was Disney's second theatrical film based on one of their theme park attractions and the third overall film based on an attraction following the television film Tower of Terror (1997) and the theatrically released Mission to Mars (2000).

== Legacy ==
=== Influence on Other Animatronics ===
- Chuck E. Cheese restaurants were inspired by the Walt Disney World versions of Country Bear Jamboree and the Enchanted Tiki Room to produce their own animatronic musical shows.
- In 1977, the Phantasialand theme park in Brühl, Germany would receive "Die Klimbimski-Show." The stage design in setup and detailing was inspired by the Country Bear Jamboree, though it contained a cast of monkeys, bears, and birds as performers. It was the first animatronic show to be produced by German manufacturer Hofmann Figuren. After closing in 1985, this show would be refurbished and relocated to Avonturenpark Hellendoorn where it operated from 1989 up through 2003 as the "Hellendoorn Magical Monkey Show."
  - Hofmann would later create more shows inspired by Country Bear Jamboree including "The Koala Country Show" for Dreamworld in Queensland, Australia (1982), as well as "Le Niglo Show" for Nigloland in France (1991).
- Creative Engineering, Inc. (CEI) produced several animatronic shows inspired by the Country Bear Jamboree.
  - In 1978, the "Bear Country Jubilee" opened in both Americana Amusement Park in Middletown, Ohio and Morey's Piers in Wildwood, New Jersey. The Americana Amusement Park installation would operate until 1993 and was presumably destroyed. The Morey's Piers installation operated until 1984, where it was then sent back to Creative Engineering, remaining in their ownership to this day.
    - Both installations included two mounted animal heads, a moose named Mortimer and a bison named Bufford, both clearly inspired by Melvin and Buff from the Country Bear Jamboree.
  - In 1979, CEI created an improved version of the Bear Country Jubilee, this time titled "Country Bear Jubilee", but are better remembered as the "Hard Luck Bears" after the center stage band of bears. This version was formerly available globally, with installations in the United States, the United Kingdom (1980), Brazil (1981), Italy (1982), Canada (1982), and Chile (1983).
    - Carowinds opened a custom-modified version of the Hard Luck Bears known as "The Honey Bear Bunch Family Reunion," which operated for the 1980 and 1981 seasons.
    - Knoebels, the longest-running installation in the United States, had a variety of overlays throughout its operating span after debuting with the original soundtrack in 1980. These overlays included the Country Bear Picnic at Knoebels Groves (1986), The Hard Luck Bears Hoedown Hootenanny WingDing (1990), and Rockin' Billy Wilbur & The Bearcats (1992). The latter overlay completely redressed the characters and stages into a 1950s rock and roll theme, and was the final iteration at the park until its closure in 1995.
  - In 1980, CEI developed The Rock-afire Explosion, a combination of the past Wolf Pack 5 and Hard Luck Bears shows, with Billy Bob Brockali (a hillbilly bear) as the main mascot. This band would soon achieve nationwide fame due to being installed in the ShowBiz Pizza Place chain, plus other family entertainment centers across the United States and abroad.
    - The Gulliver's chain of amusement parks in the United Kingdom installed three modified Rock-afire Explosion shows that were also titled as the Hard Luck Bears. Creative Engineering recycled the character masks from the original Hard Luck Bears (above) for redesigning the Rock-afire cast all as bears (although Billy Bob, Beach Bear, and Earl Schmerle remained facially intact). Gulliver's installed these shows at their parks in Warrington (1993), Matlock Bath (1995), and Milton Keynes (1999), where all but Milton Keynes remain currently operating.
      - Gullivers' attempt to emulate Disney's Country Bears was way more blatant. Warrington's theater was built with a ceiling hole originally meant for a Teddi Barra-like character to descend down from (though no such character existed in the original Rock-afire nor the Hard Luck Bears retrofit). Matlock Bath had an extended platform outward from the main three stages where automaton bear props (sourced from David Aldridge Animations) were meant to rise from below and in between two water fountains. However, only the existing Rock-afire character of Looney Bird was placed in a shaft to rise out from the platform, though was moved back to Billy Bob's stage proper in 2022 (as per the Rock-afire standard). Milton Keynes' queue evidently copied the sizable dressing room doors gag that was originally present in Disneyland's and Tokyo Disneyland's theater queues.
- The Black Bear Jamboree was a dinner show in Pigeon Forge, Tennessee that opened in 2002. It featured six animatronic bears built by Sally Corporation that were partially inspired by Disney's Country Bears. The bear characters would appear as interstitials during live performances by actors and musicians. The show closed in 2010, being replaced by a Hatfields & McCoys live stage production.
  - Sally also developed animatronic shows loosely inspired by Country Bear Jamboree in the forms of Bubba and the Badland Band, as well as Billy Jo and the Bluegrass Boys, both debuting in 1987.

== See also ==
- List of Magic Kingdom attractions
- List of former Disneyland attractions
- Tokyo Disneyland attraction and entertainment history
- List of Disney attractions using Audio-Animatronics
