= Take Possession =

Single by Jean Shepard
- A-side: "A Satisfied Mind"
- Released: May 1955
- Label: Capitol
- Songwriter(s): Tom Glazer, Helen Martell

Jean Shepard singles chronology
| "Did You Tell Her About Me" (1955) | "Take Possession" (1955) | "Beautiful Lies" (1955) |

"Take Possession" is a single by American country music artist Jean Shepard. It was released on the B-side of the single "A Satisfied Mind". The song reached #13 on the Billboard Most Played C&W in Juke Boxes chart.

== Chart performance ==
| Chart (1955) | Peak position |
|---|---|
| U.S. Billboard Most Played C&W in Juke Boxes | 13 |
