= Lighthearted and Blue =

Studio album by Jean Shepard
- Released: October 1964
- Recorded: August 1963–January 1964
- Studio: Bradley Studios (Nashville, Tennessee)
- Genre: Country
- Label: Capitol
- Producer: Marvin Hughes

Jean Shepard chronology
| The Best of Jean Shepard (1963) | Lighthearted and Blue (1964) | It's a Man Every Time (1965) |

Lighthearted and Blue is a studio album by American country singer Jean Shepard. It was released in October 1964 by Capitol Records and was her fifth studio album. It was the first studio project released following the death of Shepard's husband in a plane crash in 1963. The album was a collection of 12 cover songs that was reviewed positively by both Billboard and AllMusic. It was her first album to make the US country chart as well.

== Background, recording and content ==
Jean Shepard had first broke through into mainstream country music with a pair of singles with Ferlin Husky in 1953. As a solo artist, she broke through in 1955 with a pair of top ten singles. As the decade progressed, Shepard's commercial success waned, partially due to influx of rock and roll and the Nashville Sound crossover country style. In 1963, Shepard also lost her husband Hawkshaw Hawkins in a plane crash. Shepard considered abandoning her career altogether following the accident. Ultimately, she chose to refocus her priorities and continue her music career. Lighthearted and Blue was Shepard's first studio album following the accident.

Lighthearted and Blue was recorded at the Bradley Film and Recording Studio in Nashville, Tennessee. Sessions for the project were held between August 1963 and January 1964. The project was produced by Marvin Hughes, Shepard's first album produced by him after ten years recording with Ken Nelson. The album was a collection of 12 tracks. It was theorized that the album's conceptual focus on sad material was due to Shepard's grief following the death of Hawkins. The 12 songs were all covers tunes from the country music field. This included Roger Miller's "When Two Worlds Collide", Lefty Frizzell's "If You've Got the Money, I've Got the Time" and Freddie Hart's "Loose Talk".

== Release and critical reception ==
Professional ratings
Review scores
| Source | Rating |
|---|---|
| Allmusic | 3/5 stars |

Lighthearted and Blue was released by Capitol Records in October 1964. It was Shepard's fifth studio album in her career and her first since 1962's Heartaches and Tears. It was distributed as a vinyl LP offered in both mono and stereo formats. Six tracks were featured on either side of the record. Lighthearted and Blue was among 20 LP albums that Capitol issued in the fall of 1964. Billboard gave the album a positive reception, calling it "one of her finest". "Jean once again demonstrates in this album why is one of the best loved and most respected performers and consistent record sellers in the C&W field," they wrote. AllMusic rated the album three out of five stars, calling it her "comeback album". Lighthearted and Blue was Shepard's first album to make the US Billboard Top Country Albums chart. That year it reached the number 17 position and would be the start of a series of LP's to make the same chart.

== Track listing ==
Side one
| No. | Title | Writer(s) | Length |
|---|---|---|---|
| 1. | "Loose Talk" | Anne Lucas; Freddie Hart | 2:21 |
| 2. | "That's What It's Like to Be Lonesome" | Bill Anderson | 2:28 |
| 3. | "I Can't Stop Loving You" | Don Gibson | 2:27 |
| 4. | "The Violet and a Rose" | Auge; Dickens; Reinfield; Tillis | 2:24 |
| 5. | "Just Call Me Lonesome" | Rex Griffin | 2:19 |
| 6. | "Foggy River" | Fred Rose | 2:16 |

Side two
| No. | Title | Writer(s) | Length |
|---|---|---|---|
| 1. | "The Big Wheel" | C. Chenier | 2:17 |
| 2. | "Born to Lose" | Frankie Brown | 2:32 |
| 3. | "Half a Mind" | Maurice Murray; Kenny Bowers | 2:39 |
| 4. | "When Two Worlds Collide" | Roger Miller; Anderson | 2:03 |
| 5. | "Cigarettes and Coffee Blues" | Marty Robbins | 2:25 |
| 6. | "If You've Got the Money, I've Got the Time" | Lefty Frizzell; Jim Beck | 2:00 |

== Chart performance ==
| Chart (1964) | Peak position |
|---|---|
| US Top Country Albums (Billboard) | 17 |

== Release history ==
| Region | Date | Format | Label | Ref. |
|---|---|---|---|---|
| Germany | October 1964 | Vinyl LP (Stereo) | Capitol Records | |
| Japan | October 1964 | Vinyl LP (Stereo Red) | Capitol Records | |
| North America; United Kingdom | October 1964 | Vinyl LP (Mono); Vinyl LP (Stereo) | Capitol Records | |
