= Mercy, Ain't Love Good =

Studio album by Jean Shepard
- Released: August 1976
- Studio: Jack Clement Recording (Nashville, Tennessee)
- Genre: Country
- Label: United Artists
- Producer: Larry Butler

Jean Shepard chronology
I'm a Believer (1975)	Mercy, Ain't Love Good (1976)	Stars of the Grand Ole Opry (1981)

Singles from Mercy, Ain't Love Good
- 1. "Mercy" Released: February 1976; 2. "Ain't Love Good" Released: May 1976

Mercy, Ain't Love Good is a studio album by American country singer Jean Shepard. It was released in August 1976 by United Artists Records and was her twenty fourth studio album. The project contained a total of ten tracks, including two singles for which the album's name was derived from: "Mercy" and "Ain't Love Good". Both reached the US country chart as did the album itself. The album was Shepard's final for the United Artists label.

== Background, recording and content ==
One of country's first female artists, Jean Shepard had a series of successful singles between the 1950s and the 1970s. She moved to the United Artists label in the 1970s and remained there for several years. Her final studio project released with the label was Mercy, Ain't Love Good. The album was made at the Jack Clement Recording Studio, located in Nashville, Tennessee. The sessions for the album were produced by Larry Butler. The album contained a total of ten tracks. The project's name derived from two separate songs included in the track listing: "Mercy" (written by Bill Anderson) and "Ain't Love Good" (written by Larry Butler and Ben Peters). The project also featured Webb Pierce's "Slowly" and Don Gibson's "A Satisfied Woman".

== Release, reception, chart performance and singles ==
Mercy, Ain't Love Good was released by United Artists Records in August 1976. It was Shepard's twenty fourth studio album in her career. The label distributed it as a vinyl LP, with five songs on each side of the disc. Billboard magazine described the project when going through Shepard's career in a 1976 issue: "If more proof were needed, Jean's latest album Mercy, Ain't Love Good reveals even more of her explosive country content." The album was then advertised in a United Artists lineup for Billboard around the same period.

In late-1976, Mercy, Ain't Love Good reached the top 40 of the US Billboard Top Country Albums chart, rising to the number 37 position. It was Shepard's final charting Billboard album in her career. Two singles were included in the project. "Mercy" was the earliest single issued, officially released by United Artists in February 1976. It reached number 49 on the US Billboard Hot Country Songs chart in mid-1976. "Ain't Love Good" was released in May 1976 as a single. It reached number 41 on the US country songs chart in 1976 as well.

== Track listing ==
Side one
No.	Title	Writer(s)	Length
1.	"Mercy"	B. Anderson	2:30
2.	"Come on Home"	G. Richey; J. Rhodes	2:48
3.	"A Satisfied Woman"	D. Gibson	2:05
4.	"I Can't Imagine"	D. Orender; J. Young	2:59
5.	"Name Dropper"	B. Taylor; S. Kesler	2:23

Side two
No.	Title	Writer(s)	Length
1.	"Ain't Love Good"	L. Butler; B. Peters	2:02
2.	"Slowly"	W. Pierce; T. Hill	2:42
3.	"Sing Me an Old Fashioned Song"	J. Slate; L. Henley	2:30
4.	"We're All the Way"	D. Williams	3:01
5.	"Wife of a Hard Working Man"	S. Hale	2:44

== Personnel ==
All credits are adapted from the liner notes of Mercy, Ain't Love Good.

Musical personnel

- Tommy Allsup – Bass guitar
- Jimmy Capps – Guitar
- Jim Colvard – Guitar
- Jack Eubanks – Guitar
- The Jordanaires – Backing vocals
- Kenny Malone – Drums
- Carol Montgomery – Backing vocals
- Weldon Myrick – Steel guitar
- Leon Rhodes – Guitar
- George Richey – Piano
- Hargus "Pig" Robbins – Piano
- Billy Sanford – Guitar
- Jean Shepard – Lead vocals

Technical personnel

- Larry Butler – Producer
- Rita Lewerke – Art direction
- John Mattos – Illustration (cover)
- Billy Sherrill – Engineer
- Leonard Spencer – Design

== Chart performance ==
Chart (1976)	Peak position
US Top Country Albums (Billboard)	37

== Release history ==
Region	Date	Format	Label	Ref.
North America	August 1976	Vinyl LP (Stereo)	United Artists Records	
Australia	August 1976	Vinyl LP (Stereo)	United Artists Records	
United Kingdom	August 1976	Vinyl LP (Stereo)	United Artists Records	
