= Heartaches and Tears =

Studio album by Jean Shepard
- Released: March 1962
- Recorded: May 1961
- Studio: Bradley Studios (Nashville, Tennessee)
- Genre: Country; Honky-tonk
- Label: Capitol
- Producer: Ken Nelson

Jean Shepard chronology
Got You on My Mind (1961)	Heartaches and Tears (1962)	The Best of Jean Shepard (1963)

Singles from Heartaches and Tears
- 1. "How Long Does It Hurt (When a Heart Breaks)" Released: June 1961

Heartaches and Tears is a studio album by American country singer Jean Shepard. It was released by Capitol Records in March 1962 with a total of 12 tracks. The tracks mixed both new material and cover tunes. Among its new tracks was the single "How Long Does It Hurt (When a Heart Breaks)". It was the fourth studio album of her career and fifth overall. The album was met with positive reviews from publications.

== Background, recording and content ==
Jean Shepard began her music career in the 1950s collaborating on her earliest recordings with Ferlin Husky. This included the chart topping 1953 single "A Dear John Letter". As a solo artist, she had her first commercial success in 1955 with several singles and released her debut studio album the following year called Songs of a Love Affair. Between 1959 and 1964, Shepard failed to have any commercial success. Nonetheless, Capitol Records continued releasing material including 1962's Heartaches and Tears. The album was recorded in May 1961 at the Bradley Film and Recording Studio located in Nashville, Tennessee.

Heartaches and Tears was produced by Ken Nelson who also wrote the liner notes. The album was a collection of 12 tracks which according to the liner notes were "beautiful country ballads" which Shepard performs "in a sentimental mood". According to the liner notes, Shepard handpicked material for the album herself. It included a mixture of both new material and cover tunes. Among its new tracks was "How Long Does It Hurt (When a Heart Breaks)" and "Go on With Your Dancing". Some of the album's cover tunes included "Leave Me Alone" and "Jealous Heart".

== Release, reception and singles ==
Professional ratings
Review scores
Source	Rating
Allmusic	4/5 stars
Billboard	4/5 stars

Heartaches and Tears was originally released in March 1962 on Capitol Records. It was distributed as a vinyl LP with six tracks on either side of the disc. The album was offered in both mono and stereo formats. It was the fourth studio album of Shepard's career and her fifth overall. In 1998, the album was reissued on a compact disc in conjunction with her 1956 studio project Songs of a Love Affair. The reissue was released by both Capitol and the EMI labels. In the 2010s decade, it was released to digital platforms including Apple Music.

Heartaches and Tears was given a positive reception from publications after its release. Billboard gave it four stars and named it among its "Specialty LP's" when reviewing the album. "The thrush rings the deepest kind of emotion and pathos out of these fine country weepers," the publication wrote. Kurt Wolff of the book Country Music: The Rough Guide called it a "classic" and found the material to be "clean, hard honky-tonk". AllMusic gave the album four out of five stars. The website named three songs as "track picks": "Go on with Your Dancing", "So Wrong, So Fast" and "I Lost You After All". The only single included on the album was the opening track "How Long Does It Hurt (When a Heart Breaks)".

== Track listing ==
Side one
No.	Title	Writer(s)	Length
1.	"How Long Does It Hurt (When a Heart Breaks)"	Virginia Midgett; D.W. Orinich	2:33
2.	"Leave Me Alone"	Wayne P. Walker	2:48
3.	"Go on with Your Dancing"	Jack Rhodes	2:39
4.	"I Don't Remember"	Marijohn Wilkin	2:11
5.	"Are You Certain?"	Bennie Benjamin; Sol Marcus	2:19
6.	"Would You Be Satisfied?"	Johnny Mullins	2:29

Side two
No.	Title	Writer(s)	Length
1.	"So Wrong, So Fast"	Frankie Walcher	2:48
2.	"Second Best"	Marie Wilson	2:50
3.	"I Lost You After All"	Ira Louvin; Helen Carter	2:25
4.	"I'd Like to Know (Where People Go)"	Roy Drusky	2:05
5.	"If You Were Losing Him to Me"	Carter	2:37
6.	"Jealous Heart"	Jenny Lou Carson	2:44

== Release history ==
Region	Date	Format	Label	Ref.
North America	March 1962	Vinyl LP (Mono); Vinyl LP (Stereo)	Capitol Records	
United Kingdom	March 1962	Vinyl LP (Mono)	World Record Club	
Europe and North America	1998	Compact disc	Capitol Records; EMI	
North America	circa 2010	Music download; streaming	Capitol Records Nashville	
