= My Bubba =

Music duo

- My Bubba performing at WOMADelaide, Australia 2018

Background information
- Origin: Sweden and Iceland
- Years active: 2010-
- Labels: Cash Only, Fake Diamond Records, Smekkleysa Records
- Members: My Larsdotter; Guðbjörg (Bubba) Tómasdóttir
- Website: www.ohmybubba.com

My Bubba is a duo consisting of Icelander Guðbjörg Bubba Tómasdóttir and Swede My Larsdotter. They sing and play music in a minimalistic, vocal-oriented folk style.

== Early years ==
Larsdotter and Tómasdóttir met by chance in Copenhagen. Bubba answered an advertisement to rent a room in Larsdotter's apartment, and they started singing together the day she moved in. Shortly thereafter, they were invited to Italy to tour, and ended up recording their first album, How it's done in Italy.

== Career ==
Founding and current members are My Larsdotter from Sweden and Guðbjörg (Bubba) Tómasdóttir from Iceland. Bubba plays guitar and My plays a Norwegian Cittra (lap harp). They both sing.

My Bubba started out as My Bubba & Mi (and was then a trio). Their debut album, How it's done in Italy, was released in 2010.

Goes Abroader, released in 2014, was recorded in Los Angeles' Seahorse Sound Studios and House of Blues Studios. The duo worked with Noah Georgeson, who previously produced albums for Joanna Newsom and Devendra Banhart.

Tracks from the album Big Bad Good (2016) were recorded as they were being written at Figure 8 Recording, the studio of producer Shahzad Ismaily, in a collaborative attempt to "capture the unrefined intimacy of a newly written song". The album was released on the duo's own label, Cash Only.

== Musical style ==
My Bubbas's musical style is described as minimalistic, vocal-oriented folk. Their music has a modern sensibility and almost sultry suggestiveness, and their lyrics have been described as playful, with vocals that are "simultaneously disarming and seductive, delicate and sensual".

== Touring ==
The group has toured Europe and the US with Damien Rice and Matthew E. White, among others. In 2014 they performed at Roskilde Festival. They have also played festivals like Iceland Airwaves, Copenhagen Jazz Festival, CMJ, Pickathon, Americana Fest and the Woodford Folk Festival in 2017/18.

== Discography ==
- 2017: Gone/You're gonna make me lonesome when you go (Third Man Blue Series Single)
- 2016: Big Bad Good
- 2014: Goes Abroader
- 2011: Wild & You (EP)
- 2011: Bob (Single)
- 2010: How it’s done in Italy

== Former members ==
- Mia Olsen
