= Red Hayes =

American singer-songwriter

Joe "Red" Hayes
- Birth name: Joe Herman Hayes
- Born: April 4, 1926; Garden Valley, Texas, U.S.
- Died: March 2, 1973 (aged 46); Manchester, Greater Manchester, England
- Genres: Country
- Occupations: Musician; singer; songwriter
- Instruments: Fiddle; vocals
- Years active: 1936–1973
- Labels: Starday

Joe Herman "Red" Hayes (1926-1973) was a fiddle player and singer-songwriter who co-wrote "A Satisfied Mind" with Jack Rhodes. He was born on April 4, 1926, in Garden Valley, Texas. During a UK tour with Faron Young, Hayes died of a heart attack on March 2, 1973, while performing in Manchester, England.
