= Ray Pillow =

American country music singer (1937–2023)

- Birth name: Herbert Raymond Pillow
- Born: July 4, 1937; Lynchburg, Virginia, U.S.
- Died: March 26, 2023 (aged 85); Nashville, Tennessee, U.S.
- Genres: Country
- Occupation: Singer
- Instrument: Vocals
- Years active: 1963–2018
- Labels: Capitol, ABC, Plantation, Mega, Dot, MCA, First Generation

Herbert Raymond Pillow (July 4, 1937 – March 26, 2023) was an American country music singer, music publisher, and artists and repertoire (A&R) representative. In his career, he had 18 singles on the Billboard country songs chart, with his highest-peaking song being the number 9 single "I'll Take the Dog", a duet with Jean Shepard. After charting for the last time in 1981, Pillow founded Sycamore Records with Larry McFadden, and later worked in the A&R department of Capitol Records.

Pillow continued to perform as a member of the Grand Ole Opry and on popular classic country television programs such as Country's Family Reunion, which airs regularly in the United States on RFD-TV network.

Through his record label, Pillow released two albums, Ray Pillow Live and Country Class, the latter of which contained new material. Pillow retired in 2018.

Pillow was a member of the Grand Ole Opry since 1966.

Pillow died in Nashville, Tennessee, on March 26, 2023, at the age of 85.

== Discography ==
=== Albums ===
Year	Single	Chart Positions
Year	Single	US Country
1965	Presenting Ray Pillow	—
1966	I'll Take the Dog (with Jean Shepard)	11
1967	Even When It's Bad, It's Good	—
1969	Ray Pillow Sings	—
1969	People Music	—
1972	Slippin' Around with Ray Pillow	—
1975	Countryfied	46
1984	One Too Many Memories	—
1998	Stars Of The Grand Ole Opry	
2014	Country Class	
2017	Ray Pillow Live	—

=== Singles ===
Year	Single	Chart Positions	
Year	Single	US Country	CAN Country
1965	"Take Your Hands Off My Heart"	49	—
1965	"Thank You Ma'am"	17	—
1966	"Common Colds and Broken Hearts"	32	—
1966	"I'll Take the Dog" (with Jean Shepard)	9	—
1966	"Volkswagen"	25	—
1966	"Mr. Do It Yourself" (with Jean Shepard)	25	—
1967	"I Just Want to Be Alone"	56	—
1967	"Gone with the Wine"	62	—
1968	"Wonderful Day"	51	—
1969	"Reconsider Me"	38	—
1972	"Since Then"	62	—
1972	"She's Doing It to Me Again"	66	—
1974	"Countryfied"	80	85
1974	"Livin' in the Sunshine of Your Love"	77	—
1975	"Roll On, Truckers"	100	—
1978	"Who's Gonna Tie My Shoes"	97	—
1979	"Super Lady"	82	—
1981	"One Too Many Memories"	82	—
