= I Thought of You =

Single by Jean Shepard
- B-side: "Beautiful Lies"
- Released: September 1955
- Recorded: April 1955
- Studio: Capitol Studios
- Genre: Country; Honky-tonk
- Length: 2:35
- Label: Capitol
- Songwriter: Jimmy Rollins
- Producer: Ken Nelson

Jean Shepard singles chronology
"A Satisfied Mind" (1955)	"I Thought of You" (1955)	"I Learned It All from You" (1956)

"I Thought of You" is a song composed by Jimmy Rollins that was recorded by American country singer Jean Shepard. Released as a single in 1955, it became a top-10 song on the US country chart in 1955, becoming Shepard's fourth top-10 recording in her career. It was given positive reviews by publications following its release.

== Background, recording and content ==
Jean Shepard first found success recording with Ferlin Husky in 1953's "A Dear John Letter". The single topped the country chart. In 1955, she had her first top-10 single as a solo recording artist with "A Satisfied Mind". It was followed by a second commercial success called "I Thought of You". The song had been composed by Jimmy Rollins. The song describes a woman who imagines being with her former lover, while in another man's company. The song was recorded at Capitol Studios in Hollywood in April 1955. The session was produced by Ken Nelson.

== Release, critical reception, and chart performance ==
"I Thought of You" was released by Capitol Records in September 1955. It was distributed as a seven-inch vinyl record single. Despite its B-side "Beautiful Lies" charting higher on the US country survey, "I Thought of You" was actually the A-side. Billboard found that the song had a "warm, expressive vocal treatment" with "strong, sincere lyric content". Cash Box also highlighted Shepard's vocal, calling her delivery to be in a "soft, sincere fashion". "I Thought of You" reached the number 10 position on the US Billboard Hot Country Songs chart in 1955. It became Shepard's fourth single to place in the top 10 and second as a solo recording artist.

== Track listing ==
7" vinyl single

- "I Thought of You" – 2:35
- "Beautiful Lies" – 2:46

== Charts ==
Weekly chart performance for "I Thought of You"
Chart (1955)	Peak position
US Hot Country Songs (Billboard)	10
