= Betty Amos =

American musician

Betty Amos (July 27, 1934 – September 30, 2021) was an American guitarist, banjoist, and bluegrass/country musician. She was one of the earliest women to play Scruggs-style banjo, and played in many different bands, including The Carlisles, Lump Boys, and Rhythm Queens (Betty Amos with Judy and Jean).

== Early years ==
Betty Amos was born on July 27, 1934, near Roanoke, Virginia. From a musical family, Amos played guitar in her family band, the "Buck Mountain Ramblers". Amos was taught Scruggs-style banjo by her brother Ed, and sought to develop her own style in order to not copy anybody, including Earl Scruggs.

== Career ==
=== The Carlisles ===
In 1952, Betty Amos joined The Carlisles, replacing Martha Carson. Due to her age and relationship status, she became known as "Betty Carlisle," Bill Carlisle's niece. Amos appeared on several of the Carlisles' Billboard hits, including "No Help Wanted" and "Is Zat You Myrtle." Amos left the band in 1954, beginning a solo career.

=== Solo career ===
After leaving The Carlisles in 1954, Amos retook her birthname, and signed with the Mercury label. Leading a band called the "Lump Boys," Amos frequented the Louisiana Hayride, sharing the stage with Elvis Presley. Amos recorded many singles with Mercury, including "Hello to the Blues," "Jole John," and "Yesterday's Sweetheart" Amos found success as a songwriter as well, writing the 1964 Billboard hit "Second Fiddle to an Old Guitar," which rose to number five under Jean Shepherd.

=== Betty Amos with Judy and Jean ===
After meeting Judy Alice Schreiber (Judy Lee) at the WWVA Wheeling Jamboree, Amos formed the band "Rhythm Queens" in 1960, consisting of Amos on electric rhythm guitar and banjo, Judy Lee on electric lead guitar, and Betty's sister Jean Amos on bass. Credited as "Betty Amos with Judy and Jean" after signing to Starday Records in 1963, the group played country and bluegrass music, with Betty Amos singing lead. Amos would play banjo for bluegrass sets, and electric rhythm guitar for country sets. The group often played USO shows and military bases, and on occasion would travel overseas. The group frequented the WWVA Jamboree, and released nine singles on Starday.

The group went on to record the bluegrass hits "Eighteen Wheels A-Rolling" and "Franklin County Moonshine." The group stayed together until 1977, reuniting in 2003 for the Louisiana Hayride Reunion Show in Shreveport.

In 1961, Betty, Judy, and Jean survived a plane crash while traveling to a USO show near Labrador. Despite this experience, the group played using borrowed instruments from the troops, giving the men an excellent performance.

== Death ==
Betty Amos died at the age of 87 on September 30, 2021.
