= Second Fiddle (To an Old Guitar) =

Single by Jean Shepard

from the album Heart, We Did All That We Could
- B-side: "Two Little Boys"
- Released: April 1964
- Recorded: January 27, 1964
- Studio: Columbia (Nashville, Tennessee)
- Genre: Country
- Length: 2:11
- Label: Capitol
- Songwriter: Betty Amos
- Producer: Marvin Hughes

Jean Shepard singles chronology
"When Your House Is Not a Home" (1963)	"Second Fiddle (To an Old Guitar)" (1964)	"A Tear Dropped By" (1964)

"Second Fiddle (To an Old Guitar)" is a song written by Betty Amos that was originally recorded by American country singer Jean Shepard. It was released as a single by Capitol Records in 1964, reaching the top five of the US Country chart. The song featured Shepard yodeling and was her first top ten single in ten years. The song would later be nominated by the Grammy Awards.

== Background and recording ==
One of the first female country artists to find commercial success in a solo career, Jean Shepard rose to fame during the 1950s honky tonk era. While she topped the country chart with "A Dear John Letter" as a pairing with Ferlin Husky, she had top ten singles as a solo act with "A Satisfied Mind" and "Beautiful Lies". In the second half of the 1950s, her popularity waned with the new country pop sounds that became in-vogue. Her first major success would be 1964's "Second Fiddle (To an Old Guitar)". The song was written by Betty Amos and featured Shepard yodeling. It was recorded on January 27, 1964 at the Columbia Studios in Nashville, Tennessee. The recording session was produced by Marvin Hughes. On the same day, Shepard also recorded "He Plays the Bongo (I Play the Banjo)" and "Two Little Boys". The session was produced by Marvin Hughes.

== Release, chart performance and reception ==
"Second Fiddle (To an Old Guitar)" was released as a single in April 1964. It was issued as a seven-inch vinyl record by Capitol Records, featuring "Two Little Boys" on the B-side. The song was described as Shepard's comeback recording for restoring her commercial success. It became Shepard's first charting single since 1959's "Have Heart, Will Love", peaking at the number five position on the US Billboard Hot Country Songs chart in 1964. It was her first top ten single since 1955's "I Thought of You" and one of ten top ten singles in her career.

It was later included on Shepard's 1967 studio album Heart We Did All That We Could. In 1965, it was nominated for the Grammy Award for Best Female Country Vocal Performance. Author Kurt Wolff found that the lyrics of "Second Fiddle (To an Old Guitar)" were both "proto-feminist" and "down-right bold" in his book Country Music: The Rough Guide. In 2003, it was voted among the "500 greatest singles" in the book Heartaches by the Number: Country Music's 500 Greatest Singles.

== Track listings ==
7" vinyl single

- "Second Fiddle (To an Old Guitar)" – 2:11
- "Two Little Boys" – 2:48

== Charts ==
Weekly chart performance for "Second Fiddle (To an Old Guitar)"
Chart (1964)	Peak position
US Hot Country Songs (Billboard)	5

== Accolades ==
Year	Nominee / work	Award	Result	Ref.
1965	7th Annual Grammy Awards	Best Country Vocal Performance, Female	Nominated	
