= Forgive Me, John =

Single by Ferlin Husky and Jean Shepard
- Released: September 1953
- Genre: Country
- Label: Capitol
- Songwriters: Fuzzy Owen, Jean Shepard, Lewis Talley
- Producer: Ken Nelson

"Forgive Me, John" is a song written by Fuzzy Owen, Jean Shepard, and Lewis Talley and was recorded by Ferlin Husky and Jean Shepard. It was released in September 1953. The song reached number 4 on the Billboard Most Played C&W in Juke Boxes chart and number 24 on the Billboard Hot 100.

The song was about a follow-up letter sent to John by his former sweetheart, who realized she had done wrong by marrying John's brother Don and wants to return to him, and is willing to "undo the awful wrong I've done." John reads the letter and decides he doesn't want to "do him like he done me" and wishes them well and decides to reenlist.

== Chart performance ==
Chart (1953)	Peak position
U.S. Billboard Most Played C&W in Juke Boxes	4
U.S. Billboard Hot 100	24
