= Beautiful Lies (Jean Shepard song) =

Single by Jean Shepard
- A-side: "I Thought of You"
- Released: September 1955
- Recorded: April 1955
- Studio: Capitol Studios
- Genre: Country; honky-tonk
- Length: 2:46
- Label: Capitol
- Songwriter(s): Jack Rhodes
- Producer(s): Ken Nelson

Jean Shepard singles chronology
"A Satisfied Mind" (1955)	"Beautiful Lies" (1955)	"I Learned It All from You" (1955)

"Beautiful Lies" is a song written by Jack Rhodes and recorded by American country singer Jean Shepard. It was released in September 1955 by Capitol Records as a single. It became Shepard's fifth top ten single on the US country chart in her career and was given positive reception by critics.

== Background, recording and content ==
Jean Shepard recorded a pair of duets with Ferlin Husky in 1953 ("A Dear John Letter" and "Forgive Me, John") that both became commercial successes. As a solo artist, she had her first commercial success with 1955's "A Satisfied Mind". This would be followed the same year by "Beautiful Lies". The song was composed by Jack Rhodes. The song's main character insists he tells her words she wants to hear even if he does not believe them himself. Shepard recorded the track at Hollywood's Capitol Studios in April 1955. The session was produced by Ken Nelson.

== Release, critical reception and chart performance ==
"Beautiful Lies" was released by Capitol Records as a seven-inch vinyl record single in September 1955. On the A side was the track "I Thought of You". The song received a positive reception following its release. Cash Box magazine described the track as "feelingful". When reviewing Shepard's box set The Melody Ranch Girl (which featured "Beautiful Lies"), AllMusic's Thom Owens wrote that Shepard's performance on the track was full of "fiery, passionate honky tonk". Shepard herself said of the track, "I like the song but I had a lot that I liked better." "Beautiful Lies" made a higher position on the US Billboard country chart than its A-side "I Thought of You". Entering the chart in October 1955, "Beautiful Lies" reached the number four position later that year. It became her fifth top ten Billboard country single and third as a solo artist.

== Track listing ==
7" vinyl single

- "I Thought of You" – 2:35
- "Beautiful Lies" – 2:46

== Charts ==
Weekly chart performance for "Beautiful Lies"
Chart (1955)	Peak position
US Hot Country Songs (Billboard)	4
