= A Dear John Letter =

Single by Jean Shepard and Ferlin Husky
- B-side: "I'd Rather Die Young (Than Grow Old Without You)"
- Released: July 1953 (U.S.)
- Recorded: May 19, 1953
- Studio: Capitol, 5515 Melrose Ave., Hollywood, California
- Genre: Country
- Length: 2:32
- Label: Capitol
- Songwriters: Billy Barton, Fuzzy Owen and Lewis Talley

Jean Shepard and Ferlin Husky singles chronology
"A Dear John Letter" (1953)	"Forgive Me, John" (1953)

"A Dear John Letter", or "Dear John" is a popular country music song written by Billy Barton, Fuzzy Owen and Lewis Talley. It was popularized by Ferlin Husky and Jean Shepard, and was a crossover country-pop hit in 1953.

The song played on the concept of a Dear John letter while referencing the United States' involvement in the Korean War. Here, a young woman, whose boyfriend John was stationed in Korea, writes stating that she is breaking off the relationship. To add to the heartbreak: she is marrying John's brother, Don, and wants her photograph back (because — according to the lyrics — Don wants it now).

== Chart success ==
"A Dear John Letter" was performed as a duet by the two performers, with Husky speaking his part while Shepard sang hers. "Dear John" was released in 1953 and was a big success. The song topped the Billboard magazine country charts and reached No. 4 on the Billboard pop charts; in addition, it turned the unknown singers into star performers in the United States.

When "A Dear John Letter" topped the Billboard country charts, Shepard — at 19 years, nine months — became the youngest female artist to that point to have a no. 1 country single. She kept that record for nearly 20 years, when 14-year-old Tanya Tucker topped the Hot Country Singles chart with "What's Your Mama's Name."

== Cover versions and sequels ==
"Dear John" has been covered by several other performers, including Pat Boone. Following Husky and Shepard, Skeeter Davis and Bobby Bare recorded the song together in 1965, resulting in a No. 11 country hit for themselves that year. Red Sovine also recorded cover versions of "A Dear John Letter". A version of the song was recorded for the Mr. and Mrs. Used to Be (album) by Ernest Tubb and Loretta Lynn. The song was released as "Käre John" in Sweden/Scandinavia by Swedish jazz vocalist Alice Babs and Charlie Norman and their Reeperbahn Stompers in the 1950s. Lennart and Ingrid Reuterskiöld wrote the Swedish lyrics.

Shepard and Husky recorded a reply to "Dear John", called "Forgive Me, John", which was another popular country music song.

The song was released by MGM Records (catalogue M-G-M 5161 in Australia) by the Four Horsemen with vocals by Pat O'Day, in 1954.

In 1967, Jiři Grossman covered the song with Naďa Urbánková under the title "Drahý můj" (My dear). The lyrics in Czech were mostly about the same situation with a key difference: the girl simply states her love to soldier is waning, there is no mention about another man. However, the soldier never learns about it as he is shot after reading just first two words and is happy to die with the girl's letter in his hand starting with the words "My dear". Later on (recorded in 1970) Grossmann sung a parody with Miloslav Šimek speaking the text, this time about two philatelists - one losing interest in stamps and the other losing his collection due to draught (unable to read the letter to the end because of the accident, similar as the soldier never learns about the point of the letter in the serious version).

Between 1972 and 1974, the song was covered by Singapore-based female singer Ervinna, backing music by the Charlie & His Boys, on her LP album Golden Hits of 20th Century Vol. 4 with the local White Cloud Record.

== In popular culture ==
In 1954, Stan Freberg, also of Capitol Records, released a parody version of "A Dear John Letter", which he called "A Dear John and Marsha Letter". In this parody, John tries to say his "I was overseas in battle" dialogue, but Marsha's humorous interruptions force him to change his accent a little bit. When John finishes his dialogue, Marsha steps in, much to his annoyance and forcing him to scream at her. Marsha starts lamenting about the nice things John had said to her, jumping in the flashback of "John and Marsha". John tries to cheer her up by offering her a can of worms and a pomegranate, but Marsha doesn't want any of these and requests to sing in the background, which she did. Thus, John is able to finish his spoken words, using the same accent Marsha wanted him to do earlier.

The song was featured in a New Zealand-made BASF advertisement for cassette tapes in 1980, which was shown mainly in Australia and New Zealand.
