= A Satisfied Mind =

Song by Joe Hayes and Jack Rhodes

"A Satisfied Mind" is a country music song written by Joe "Red" Hayes and Jack Rhodes. Hayes explained the origin of the song in an interview: "The song came from my mother. Everything in the song are things I heard her say over the years. I put a lot of thought into the song before I came up with the title. One day my father-in-law asked me who I thought the richest man in the world was, and I mentioned some names. He said, 'You're wrong; it is the man with a satisfied mind.'"

The song has been covered by a variety of well-known artists.

== Notable covers ==
- Mahalia Jackson in 1954 with Mildred Falls and Ralph Jones of the Falls-Jones Ensemble. The cover was eventually re-published in a 1991 cassette compilation issued by Columbia Records.
- Porter Wagoner charted at No. 1 on the Billboard Hot Country Songs list in 1955.
- Red and Betty Foley charted at No. 3 on the Billboard Hot Country Songs list in 1955.
- Jean Shepard charted at No. 4 on the Billboard Hot Country Songs list in 1955.
- Ella Fitzgerald on 1955 album The First Lady of Song (Decca) The most impressive version in the pop market, the single reached No. 25 on the "Music Vendor" Top 100, with 15 weeks in the chart, and also on The Complete Decca Singles, Vol. 4: 1950-1955 (released in 2017)
- John McCutcheon on 1987 album Gonna Rise Again
- Cowboy Copas on his 1962 album Opry Star Spotlight (Starday)
- Hamilton Camp on his 1964 album Paths of Victory (Elektra)
- Joan Baez on her 1965 album Farewell, Angelina; later appeared on her 1979 compilation Satisfied Mind.
- The Byrds on their 1965 album Turn! Turn! Turn!.
- Glen Campbell B-side of a 1966 single (A-side: "Can't You See I'm Trying"), added to the 1971 Pickwick re-release of his 1962 album Big Bluegrass Special: A Satisfied Mind
- Ian and Sylvia on their 1966 album Play One More (Vanguard)
- Bobby Hebb's 1966 revival peaked at No. 39 on the Billboard Hot 100 and No. 40 on the Hot Rhythm & Blues Singles Chart. This version was included on Bobby Hebb's 1966 album, ''Sunny''.
- Bob Dylan and The Band, recorded in 1967, released in 2014 on The Bootleg Series Vol. 11: The Basement Tapes Complete.. Bob Dylan also recorded the song for his 1980 album Saved.
- The International Submarine Band on their 1968 album Safe at Home.
- Goose Creek Symphony on their eponymous 1970 album.
- Tim Hardin on his 1971 album Bird on a Wire
- Dallas Holm on his 1971 album "For Teens Only”
- Sonny James on his 1973 album If She Helps Me Get Over You
- Roy Drusky on 1973 single. It peaked at No. 25 on US country and 38 on Canada country, making it his last top forty on the charts.
- Faron Young recorded it on his 1972 album, "It's Four in the Morning". It was also included as the title track to his 1973 album, Satisfied Mind. Red Hayes toured with Faron Young and Vassar Clements on their 1973 UK Tour, and died on stage on March 2, 1973, in Manchester UK.
- John Martyn on his 1975 album Sunday's Child
- Bryan Bowers on his 1977 album The View From Home
- David Allan Coe on his 1977 album Texas Moon
- Lucinda Williams on her 1978 album Ramblin' on My Mind
- The Ozark Mountain Daredevils on their 1978 album "It's Alive". They also recorded a studio version in 1972, later released on their compilation of previously unreleased early recordings The Lost Cabin Sessions.
- Lindsey Buckingham on his 1981 album Law and Order
- Jonathan Richman on his 1990 album Jonathan Goes Country
- The Walkabouts on their 1993 album Satisfied Mind
- Danny Gatton on his 1993 album Cruisin' Deuces
- Jeff Buckley on his 1998 posthumous album Sketches (for My Sweetheart the Drunk). The recording was made for a 1992 radio session and had been played at Jeff Buckley's funeral in 1997, which Buckley's mother Mary Guibert mentions as the reason it was included on the collection. It also features on the expanded edition of Buckley's 2016 compilation album You and I.
- Eric Bibb on his 1999 album Spirit & The Blues
- Marty Stuart & His Fabulous Superlatives on their 2003 album Country Music
- Blind Boys of Alabama on the 2004 album There Will Be a Light along with Ben Harper
- Johnny Cash at first being exclusive on the Kill Bill Vol. 2 soundtrack (2004) until his posthumously released album American VI: Ain't No Grave (2010)
- Daniel O'Donnell on his 2009 album, Peace in the Valley
- Justin Vernon from Bon Iver on his collaboration with the Eau Claire Memorial Jazz I ensemble on the 2009 live benefit album A Decade With Duke
- Rosanne Cash, featuring Neko Case, a bonus track on the iTunes version of her 2009 albumThe List
- Willie Nelson on his 2010 album Country Music and his 2011 album Remember Me, Vol. 1
- Donna Loren on her 2010 album Love It Away
- My Bubba on their 2011 album How it's Done in Italy
- Robert Plant and the Band of Joy in the 2012 Live from the Artists Den
- Kelly Keeling on his CD Knollwood Drive
- Lee Ann Womack on her 2014 album The Way I'm Livin'
- Eilen Jewell as a single in 2020
- Slaughter Beach, Dog to YouTube in 2024
- Mavis Staples on her 2025 album Sad and Beautiful World
