= Dansefeber season 1 =

Season of a television show

Dansefeber
- Season 1
- Hosted by: Henriette Lien; Kjetil Tefke
- Judges: Lars Undli; Vibeke Sørlie; Jan Ivar Lund; Merete Lingjærde
- Winner: Adil Khan
- Runner-up: Maria Henriette Nygård

Release
- Original network: TVNorge

Season chronology
- Next → Season 2

Dansefeber is the Norwegian version of So You Think You Can Dance.

Channel: TVNorge (Norway)

Dansefeber holds auditions in major cities across Norway, looking for the top dancers in each city. All types of dance backgrounds are encouraged to audition. Salsa, ballroom, hip-hop, streetdance, contemporary, jazz, ballet and many other types of dancers can be seen auditioning for a chance to win the grand prize.

The first season of Dansefeber was hosted by Kjetil Tefke and Henriette Lien and judges were Lars Undli (break dancer, one of those who brought break dance to Norway), Vibeke Sørlie (hip hop dancer and choreographer, also judge for next season), Jan Ivar Lund (jazz, contemporary and ballroom dancer and choreographer, choreographed for season 2 and So You Think You Can Dance — Scandinavia) and Merete Lingjærde (contemporary choreographer, also judge for next season of Dansefeber and So You Think You Can Dance — Scandinavia).

Male break dancer Adil Khan won the first season of Dansefeber.

Female contemporary/jazz dancer Maria H. Nygård came runner-up.

Male contemporary/jazz dancer Christopher Flinder Pedersen took the 3rd place.

Female contemporary/jazz dancer Tine Aspaas came 4th. (Aspaas was choreographer for season 2 of Dansefeber and So You Think You Can Dance — Scandinavia).

16 dancers were sent to the live shows after the Fever Days in Oslo. Then one male and one female dancer went home every week, and at the end, we knew who won the first series of Dansefeber.

== Finals ==
=== Elimination chart ===
| Week: | Finale |
| Contestant | Result |
| Adil Khan | Winner |
| Maria Henriette Nygård | Runner-up |
| Christopher Flinder Petersen | 3rd Place |
| Tina Aspaas | 4th Place |

=== Finale ===
- Group routines:
  - Top 16 (without top 4): "Bite the Dust"—Pussycat Dolls
- Couple routines:

| Couple | Style | Music | Choreographer |
|---|---|---|---|
| Tine Aspaas; Christopher Petersen | Paso Doble | "España cañí"—Boston Pops Orchestra | Gunn Myhrengen |
| Maria Nygård; Adil Khan | Paso Doble | "España cañí"—Boston Pops Orchestra | Gunn Myhrengen |
| Christopher Pedersen; Adil Khan | Hip-hop | "Can't Let You Go"—Fabolous feat. Lil Mo | Solveig Kitmitto Judy Nyambura Karanja |
| Tine Aspaas; Maria Nygård | Jazz | "Believe"—The Chemical Brothers | Subjazz |
| Maria Nygård; Christopher Pedersen | Broadway | "All That Jazz"—Ute Lemper | Toni Ferraz |
| Tine Aspaas; Adil Khan | Broadway | "All That Jazz"—Ute Lemper | Toni Ferraz |

- Solos:
  - Tine Aspaas
  - Christopher Pedersen
  - Maria Nygård
  - Adil Khan: "The Diva Dance"—Sarah Brightman
- Eliminated in order:
  - Tine Aspaas
  - Christopher Pedersen
  - Maria Nygård
- Winner:
  - Adil Khan
