= Dansefeber season 2 =

Dansefeber
- Season 2
- Hosted by: Henriette Lien
- Judges: Merete Lingjærde; Geir Bie; Vibeke Sørlie
- Winner: Hanna Mjåvatn
- Runner-up: Eric C. Nærbø
- Finals venue: Lillestrøm Kultitsenter

Release
- Original network: TVNorge

Season chronology
- ← Previous; Season 1

Dansefeber is a Norwegian television reality program and dance competition airing on the TVNorge network. The show is a version of the US original version So You Think You Can Dance. Season two premiered with Merete Lingjærde, Geir Bie and Vibeke Sørlie as permanent judges and Henriette Lien returning to host. Contemporary dancer Hanna Mjåvatn was crowned Norway's Favourite Dancer and the top prize of 500,000 norwegian kroner, as the first female dancer to win the competition in every version of the show. Runner-up was hip-hop dancer Eric Nærbø, with jazz dancer Michelle Purvis finishing 3rd, and Latin ballroom dancer Bjørn Holthe finishing 4th.

== Audition ==
=== Cities ===
Open auditions for this season were held in the following cities:

- Oslo
- Bergen
- Trondheim

=== Format ===
The format is the same as So You Think You Can Dance (US) season 2-present; the dancer could:

- Be sent straight home, because the judges did not think the dancer was good enough
- Be sent straight to the "Fever Days", same as Las Vegas Week in the US version
- Be sent to the choreography round, where the dancer will be asked to learn a choreography later hi in the day, and based on that, the judges decides who will go through to the "Fever Days"

=== The Fever Days ===
The Fever Days were held in Oslo. The "Fever Days" is the same as Las Vegas week in the US version, where the dancers will be asked to learn different styles of dance in a workshop. After all the challenges, the judges picks the top 20 finalists, 10 female and 10 male from all over Norway.

== Finals ==
=== Elimination chart ===
Contestants are in reverse chronological order of elimination.

Legend
Female	Male	Bottom 3 couples	Bottom 4 or 6 contestants

Week:	1	2	3	4	5	6	7	8	9
Contestant	Result								
Hanna Mjåvatn								Btm 4	Winner
Eric Nærbø					Btm 6	Btm 4		Btm 4	Runner-up
Michelle Purvis		Btm 3		Btm 3	Elim†		Btm 4		Third
Bjørn Holthe				Btm 3					Fourth
Philip Olsen					Btm 6		Btm 4	Elim	
Alexandra Joner								Elim	
Vegard Kristiansen							Elim		
Ellen Dybvik				Btm 3	Btm 6	Btm 4	Elim		
Ole Petter Knarvik		Btm 3		Btm 3		Elim			
Marit Halvorsen					Btm 6	Elim			
Mona Berntsen			Btm 3			WD†			
Endre Jansen			Btm 3		Elim				
Navid Rezvani			Btm 3	Elim					
Anette Stokke	Btm 3	Btm 3	Btm 3	Elim					
Lars Olav Eltervaag	Btm 3	Btm 3	Elim						
Sara Einbu			Elim						
Hugo Hagström	Btm 3	Elim							
Anett Amundsen	Btm 3	Elim							
Chenno Tim	Elim								
Trine Lise Akselsen	Elim								

†Mona Berntsen suffered an injury that resulted in her being unable to continue in the competition. She was medically withdrawn, and Michelle Purvis replaced her as she was the most recent female competitor eliminated. That meant Berntsen was able to try for the next season, which it was not going to be, but bigger, in So You Think You Can Dance (Scandinavia), which she won.

=== All shows ===
==== Audition 1 (Oslo) ====
The first episode of Dansefeber was audition in Oslo.

- Auditioners which got the top 20:
  - Hanna Mjåvatn (winner)
  - Eric Nærbø (runner-up)
  - Michelle Purvis (3rd place)
  - Bjørn Holthe (4th place)
  - Philip Olsen (top 6)
  - Alexandra Joner (top 6)
  - Ellen Dybvik (top 8)
  - Endre Jansen (top 12)
  - Mona Berntsen (top 12, winner of So You Think You Can Dance (Scandinavia)
  - Navid Rezvani (top 14)
  - Hugo Hagström (top 18)
  - Anett Amundsen (top 18)

==== Audition 2 (Bergen) ====
The second episode of Dansefeber was audition in Bergen.

- Auditioners which got to the top 20:
  - Ole Petter Knarvik (top 10)
  - Marit Halvorsen (top 10)
  - Anette Stokke (top 14)
  - Lars Olav Eltervaag (top 16)
  - Sara Einbu (top 16)
  - Trine Lise Akselsen (top 20)

==== Audition 3 (Trondheim) ====
The third episode of Dansefeber was audition in Trondheim.

- Auditioners which got to the top 20:
  - Vegard Kristiansen (top 8)
  - Chenno Tim (top 20)

==== The Fever Days ====
The fourth episode of Dansefeber was the Fever Days in Oslo, which is the same as Las Vegas Week in the US version.

==== Week 1 (Top 20) ====
The fifth episode of Dansefeber, was the first live-show, held in Lillestrøm Kultursenter in Lillestrøm.

Couple	Style	Music	Choreographer	Results
Mona Berntsen; Endre Jansen	Afro	"Wanna Be Startin' Somethin'"—Michael Jackson	David Byer	Safe
Michelle Purvis; Ole Petter Knarvik	Hip-hop	"Tipsy"—J-Kwon	Huyen Huynh	Safe
Anette Stokke; Hugo Hagström	Salsa	"Ran Kan Kan"—Tito Puente and His Orchestra	Jazzy	Bottom 3
Trine Lise Akselsen; Chenno Tim	Jazz	"Candyman"—Christina Aguilera	Toni Ferraz	Both eliminated
Ellen Dybvik; Bjørn Holthe	Hip-hop	"Rid wit' u"—Joe (ft. G-Unit)	Paulo Herrera	Safe
Sara Einbu; Navid Rezvani	Afro	"Yéké Yéké"—Mory Kanté	David Byer	Safe
Anett Amundsen; Lars Olav Eltervaag	Salsa	"Conga"—Gloria Estefan	Jazzy	Bottom 3
Hanna Mjåvatn; Philip Olsen	Modern	"Catch"—Sølve, Eide-Martinsen & Berntsen	Sølvi Edvardsen	Safe
Marit Halvorsen; Eric Nærbø	English Waltz	"Goodbye, England's Rose"—Elton John	Gunn B. Myhrengen	Safe
Alexandra Joner; Vegard Kristiansen	Jazz	"Hit the Road Jack"—Ray Charles	Toni Ferraz	Safe

- Musical guest: "Mor du e hott!"—Tungtvann
- Solos:
  - Anette Stokke: "Smooth Criminal"—Michael Jackson
  - Hugo Hagström: "Labor Day (It's a Holiday)"—The Black Eyed Peas
  - Anett Amundsen: "Hanky Panky"—Madonna
  - Lars Olav Eltervaag: "Summertime"—Billy Stewart
  - Trine Lise Akselsen: "Wake Me Up Before You Go-Go"—Wham!
  - Chenno Tim: "Lose Control"—Missy Elliott (ft. Ciara & Fat Man Scoop)
- Eliminated:
  - Trine Lise Akselsen
  - Chenno Tim
- New partners:
  - None

==== Week 2 (Top 18) ====
The sixth episode of Dansefeber, was the second live-show.

Couple	Style	Music	Choreographer	Results
Alexandra Joner; Vegard Kristiansen	Hip-hop	"My Love"—Justin Timberlake (ft. T.I.)	Solveig Kitmitto	Safe
Marit Halvorsen; Eric Nærbø	Contemporary Jazz	"Funk Up Beats"—The Chemical Brothers	Knut Arild Flatner; Karl-Erik Nedregaard	Safe
Anette Stokke; Hugo Hagström	Disco	"Hot Stuff"—Donna Summer	David Byer	Hagström eliminated
Sara Einbu; Navid Rezvani	Cha-cha-cha	"The Madonna Medley"—Madonna	Gunn B. Myhrengen	Safe
Mona Berntsen; Endre Jansen	Lyrical jazz	"Hangin' by a Thread"—Jann Arden	Toni Ferraz	Safe
Michelle Purvis; Ole Petter Knarvik	Modern Jazz-inspired; Argentine tango	"Santa Maria (Del Buen Ayre)"—Gotan Project	Jan Ivar Lund	Bottom 3
Anett Amundsen; Lars Olav Eltervaag	Hip-hop	"The Boogie That Be"—The Black Eyed Peas	Solveig Kitmitto	Amundsen eliminated
Ellen Dybvik; Bjørn Holthe	Contemporary Jazz	"Don't Let Go"—Bryan Adams & Sarah McLachlan	Knut Arild Flatner; Karl-Erik Nedregaard	Safe
Hanna Mjåvatn; Philip Olsen	Disco	"Boogie Wonderland"—Earth, Wind & Fire (ft. The Emotions)	David Byer	Safe

- Solos:
  - Anett Amundsen: "Gabriel"—Lamb
  - Lars Olav Eltervaag: "Jump, Jive and Wail"—The Brian Setzer Orchestra
  - Anette Stokke: "Don't You Worry 'bout a Thing"—Stevie Wonder
  - Hugo Hagström: "All Nite (Don't Stop)"—Janet Jackson
  - Michelle Purvis: "Weapon of Choice"—Fatboy Slim
  - Ole Petter Knarvik: "Papa's Got a Brand New Bag"—James Brown
- Eliminated:
  - Anett Amundsen
  - Hugo Hagström
- New partners:
  - Anette Stokke and Lars Olav Eltervaag

==== Week 3 (Top 16) ====
The seventh episode of Dansefeber, was the third live-show.

Couple	Style	Music	Choreographer	Results
Anette Stokke; Lars Olav Eltervaag	Musical	"Love for Sale"—Eartha Kitt	Toni Ferraz	Eltervaag eliminated
Ellen Dybvik; Bjørn Holthe	Jazz	"Absent Minded Friends"—Moloko	Sylvi Fredriksen	Safe
Michelle Purvis; Ole Petter Knarvik	Samba	"Mr. Melody"—Natalie Cole	Tom Erik Nilsen	Safe
Hanna Mjåvatn; Philip Olsen	Electric Boogie	"Me & U"—Cassie	Katrine Bølstad	Safe
Mona Berntsen; Endre Jansen	Locking	"Rock Steady"—Aretha Franklin	Dag Melhuus; Martin Eneberg	Bottom 3
Sara Einbu; Navid Rezvani	Jazz	"Battle Flag"—Lo Fidelity Allstars (ft. Pigeonhead)	Sylvi Fredriksen	Einbu eliminated
Marit Halvorsen; Eric Nærbø	Musical	"Too Darn Hot" from Kiss Me, Kate	Toni Ferraz	Safe
Alexandra Joner; Vegard Kristiansen	Electric Boogie	"Weather People"—RJD2	Katrine Bølstad	Safe

- Solos:
  - Anette Stokke: "Ain't It Funny"—Jennifer Lopez
  - Lars Olav Eltervaag: "I Heard It Through the Grapevine"—Marvin Gaye
  - Sara Einbu: "Power"—Wade Robson
  - Navid Rezvani: "SexyBack"—Justin Timberlake
  - Mona Berntsen: "Ring the Alarm"—Beyoncé
  - Endre Jansen: "Ain't No Other Man"—Christina Aguilera
- Eliminated:
  - Sara Einbu
  - Lars Olav Eltervaag
- New partners:
  - Anette Stokke and Navid Rezvani

==== Week 4 (Top 14) ====
The eighth episode of Dansefeber, was the fourth live-show.

Couple	Style	Music	Choreographer	Results
Michelle Purvis; Ole Petter Knarvik	Jazz	"Small"—Lamb	Kristine Melby	Bottom 3
Mona Berntsen; Endre Jansen	Jive	"Bye Bye"—David Civera	Gunn B. Myhrengen	Safe
Ellen Dybvik; Bjørn Holthe	Hip-hop-salsa	"Get on Down"—Leki (ft. Lunaman)	Linda Burns	Bottom 3
Marit Halvorsen; Eric Nærbø	Jazz	"Promiscuous"—Nelly Furtado (ft. Timbaland)	Kristine Melby	Safe
Alexandra Joner; Vegard Kristiansen	Lyrical hip-hop	"Iceberg"—Tweet	Belinda Braza	Safe
Anette Stokke; Navid Rezvani	Afro Jazz	"Rock This Party (Everybody Dance Now)"—Bob Sinclar & Cutee B (ft. Dollarman, Big Ali & Makedah)	David Byer	Both eliminated
Hanna Mjåvatn; Philip Olsen	Contemporary Jazz	"Sweet Dreams (Are Made of This)"—Eurythmics	Jan Ivar Lund	Safe

- Musical guest: "Fever"—Tone Damli Aaberge
- Solos:
  - Anette Stokke: "Nasty"—Janet Jackson
  - Navid Rezvani: "Breaking the Habit"—Linkin Park
  - Michelle Purvis: "Say It Right"—Nelly Furtado
  - Ole Petter Knarvik: "Celebration"—Kool & the Gang
  - Ellen Dybvik: "Trust a Try"—Janet Jackson
  - Bjørn Holthe: "Tequila"—The Champs
- Eliminated:
  - Anette Stokke
  - Navid Rezvani
- New partners:
  - None. Now that only top 12 is remain, dancers pick their partners randomly from a hat.

==== Week 5 (Top 12) ====
The ninth episode of Dansefeber, was the fifth live-show.

Couple	Style	Music	Choreographer	Results
Alexandra Joner; Bjørn Holthe	Jazz	"Strangers"—Portishead	Sylvi Fredriksen	Safe
Marit Halvorsen; Endre Jansen	Hip-hop	"March"—Hi-Tek (ft. Busta Rhymes)	Maria Karlsen	Jansen eliminated Halvorsen in bottom 6
Michelle Purvis; Eric Nærbø	Rumba-inspired Modern Jazz	"Red Right Hand"—Nick Cave and the Bad Seeds	Jan Ivar Lund	Purvis eliminated† Nærbø in bottom 6
Ellen Dybvik; Philip Olsen	Musical	"This Business of Love" from The Mask	Toni Ferraz	Bottom 6
Hanna Mjåvatn; Vegard Kristiansen	Tango	"El Picadors"—C. Novelli	Gunn B. Myhrengen	Safe
Mona Berntsen; Ole Petter Knarvik	New style hip-hop	"Ice Box"—Omarion	Maxim	Berntsen withdrawn† Knarvik safe

- Solos:
  - Marit Halvorsen: "Mindfields"—The Prodigy
  - Endre Jansen: "Know the Ledge"—Eric B. & Rakim
  - Ellen Dybvik: "Get on the Good Foot"—James Brown
  - Philip Olsen: "I Got You (I Feel Good)"—James Brown
  - Michelle Purvis: "Long Way 2 Go"—Cassie
  - Eric Nærbø: "Gallery"—Mario Vazquez
- Eliminated:
  - Michelle Purvis†
  - Endre Jansen

† Mona Berntsen was injured and could not perform next week. Then Michelle Purvis came into the competition again and competing next week instead of Berntsen. (The same happened almost like in So You Think You Can Dance season 4 when Jessica King was injured and Comfort Fedoke came in competing next week)

==== Week 6 (Top 10) ====
The tenth episode of Dansefeber, was the sixth live-show.

Couple	Style	Music	Choreographer	Results
Marit Halvorsen; Ole Petter Knarvik	Hip-hop	"CatDiesel"—k-os	Réo Magustas	Both eliminated
Marit Halvorsen; Ole Petter Knarvik	Salsa	"Sunny Ray"—Mambo All-Stars	Jazzy	Both eliminated
Alexandra Joner; Eric Nærbø	Paso Doble	"My Heart Will Go On"—BBM	Gunn B. Myhrengen	Nærbø in bottom 4
Alexandra Joner; Eric Nærbø	Hip-hop	"Handful"—Kelis	Belinda Braza; Jens Trinidad	Nærbø in bottom 4
Michelle Purvis; Philip Olsen	Contemporary Jazz	"Closing In"—Imogen Heap	Tine Aspaas	Safe
Michelle Purvis; Philip Olsen	Quickstep	"King of Dance"—C. Novelli	Gunn B. Myhrengen	Safe
Hanna Mjåvatn; Bjørn Holthe	Club salsa	"Do You Only Wanna Dance"—Julio Daviel Band	Jazzy	Safe
Hanna Mjåvatn; Bjørn Holthe	Musical	"Fake Your Way to the Top"—Dreamgirls	David Byer	Safe
Ellen Dybvik; Vegard Kristiansen	Disco	"Hot Stuff"—Donna Summer	David Byer	Dybvik in bottom 4
Ellen Dybvik; Vegard Kristiansen	Contemporary Jazz	"Message in a Bottle"—The Police	Tine Aspaas	Dybvik in bottom 4

- Solos:
  - Marit Halvorsen: "I'm Really Hot"—Missy Elliott
  - Eric C. Nærbø: "Wanna Move"—P. Diddy (ft. Big Boi, Ciara & ScAr)
  - Ellen Dybvik: "Sir Duke"—Stevie Wonder
  - Ole Petter Knarvik: "Getaway"—Earth, Wind & Fire
- Eliminated:
  - Marit Halvorsen
  - Ole Petter Knarvik

==== Week 7 (Top 8) ====
The eleventh episode of Dansefeber, was the seventh live-show.

Couple	Style	Music	Choreographer	Results
Hanna Mjåvatn; Eric Nærbø	Latin-inspired Jazz	"El Fuego"—Santana	Toni Ferraz	Safe
Hanna Mjåvatn; Eric Nærbø	Hip-hop	"Put 'Em Up"—N.O.R.E. (ft. Pharrell Williams)	Huyen Huynh	Safe
Michelle Purvis; Vegard Kristiansen	Jive	"Jump, Jive and Wail"—The Brian Setzer Orchestra	Tom Erik Nilsen	Kristiansen eliminated Purvis in bottom 4
Michelle Purvis; Vegard Kristiansen	Contemporary Jazz	"Die Another Day"—Madonna	Knut Arild Flatner; Karl-Erik Nedregaard	Kristiansen eliminated Purvis in bottom 4
Alexandra Joner; Bjørn Holthe	Contemporary Jazz	"Fly"—Celine Dion	Knut Arild Flatner; Karl-Erik Nedregaard	Safe
Alexandra Joner; Bjørn Holthe	Rumba	"Do You, Do You, Do You, Do You Wanna Dance?"—Laurent Vuoszley	Gunn B. Myhrengen	Safe
Ellen Dybvik; Philip Olsen	Hip-hop meets Dancehall	"All Eyes on Me"—LeToya	Solveig Kitmitto; Thomas Prestø	Dybvik eliminated Olsen in bottom 4
Ellen Dybvik; Philip Olsen	Musical	"Sandman"—Aretha Franklin	Toni Ferraz	Dybvik eliminated Olsen in bottom 4

- Solos:
  - Ellen Dybvik: "It's Like That"—Run-D.M.C. vs. Jason Nevins
  - Philip Olsen: "Colorblind"—Counting Crows
  - Michelle Purvis: "Grace Kelly"—Mika
  - Vegard Kristiansen: "I Question Mark"—Wade Robson
- Eliminated:
  - Ellen Dybvik
  - Vegard Kristiansen

==== Dansefeber: The Easter Special ====
It was made an Easter special episode this week, where we got to see un-watched auditions, plus the judges' favourite moments of the season so far. The host and the judges is on the mountain, eating Easter food, and discussing the top 6. The judges' favourite routines were seen one more time:

- Merete Lingjærde: Hanna Mjåvatn and Philip Olsen (Modern; Choreographer: Sølvi Edvardsen)
- Geir Bie: Michelle Purvis and Eric Nærbø (Rumba-inspired modern jazz; Choreographer: Jan Ivar Lund)
- Vibeke Sørlie: Mona Berntsen and Ole Petter Knarvik (Hip-hop; Choreographer: Maxim)

==== Week 8 (Top 6/Semi-Final) ====
The thirteenth episode of Dansefeber, was the eighth live-show. This show was the semi-final.

Couple	Style	Music	Choreographer	Results
Alexandra Joner; Philip Olsen	Breaking	"It's Just Begun"—Jimmy Castor Bunch	Lars Undli	Both eliminated
Alexandra Joner; Philip Olsen	Salsa	"Mambo de la Luz"—Orquesta de la Luz	Jazzy	Both eliminated
Hanna Mjåvatn; Eric Nærbø	Viennese Waltz	"Padam, Padam"—Édith Piaf	Gunn B. Myhrengen	Bottom 4
Hanna Mjåvatn; Eric Nærbø	Locking	"Dancing Machine"—The Jackson 5	Dag Melhuus; Martin Eneberg	Bottom 4
Michelle Purvis; Bjørn Holthe	Modern	"Catch"—Sølve, Eide-Martinsen & Berntsen	Sølvi Edvardsen	Safe
Michelle Purvis; Bjørn Holthe	Cha Cha	"Sway"—The Pussycat Dolls	Gunn B. Myhrengen	Safe

- Group dance: "Don't Give Up"—Basement Jaxx (Contemporary; Choreographer: Tine Aspaas)
- Musical guest: "Dodge It"—Samsaya
- Solos:
  - Hanna Mjåvatn: "Canon in D"—Johann Pachelbel
  - Alexandra Joner: "Wind It Up"—Gwen Stefani
  - Eric C. Nærbø: "Give It to Me"—Timbaland (ft. Nelly Furtado & Justin Timberlake)
  - Philip Olsen: "Jazz Machine"—Black Machine
- Eliminated:
  - Alexandra Joner
  - Philip Olsen

==== Week 9 (Top 4/Finale) ====
The fourteenth episode of Dansefeber, was the ninth live-show. This show was the grand finale.

Couple	Style	Music	Choreographer
Hanna Mjåvatn; Eric Nærbø	Hip-hop	"Damn Damn Damn"—Mark Morrison (ft. Idena Howards)	Paulo Herrera
Hanna Mjåvatn; Eric Nærbø	Tango	"Sin Rumbo"—Otros Aires	Jan Ivar Lund
Michelle Purvis; Bjørn Holthe	Samba	"Magaleñha"—Sérgio Mendes	Gunn B. Myhrengen
Michelle Purvis; Bjørn Holthe	Hip-hop	"What u Got 4 me"—El Axel	Solveig Kitmitto
Hanna Mjåvatn; Michelle Purvis	Modern	"Absurd"—Fluke	Knut Arild Flatner; Karl-Erik Nedregaard
Bjørn Holthe; Eric C. Nærbø	Modern	"This Is the New Shit"—Marilyn Manson	Tine Aspaas

- Group routines:
  - The b-boys of the season (Chenno Tim, Navid Rezvani, Endre Jansen and Ole Petter Knarvik): "Give It Up or Turnit a Loose"—James Brown (Breaking)
  - Top 20 (without top 4): "Water"—Ying Yang Twins (Hip-hop)
- Musical guest:
  - "Leo"—Mira Craig (with guest dancers Ole Petter Knarvik and Navid Rezvani)
- Solos:
  - Hanna Mjåvatn:
    - "Why Does My Heart Feel So Bad?"—Moby
  - Eric Nærbø (mix of three songs):
    - "Because of You"—Ne-Yo
    - "Come Thru"—DMX (ft. Busta Rhymes)
    - "Give It to Me"—Timbaland (ft. Nelly Furtado & Justin Timberlake)
  - Michelle Purvis (mix of two songs):
    - "Good Luck"—Basement Jaxx
    - "LoveStoned/I Think She Knows"—Justin Timberlake
- Eliminated in order:
  - Bjørn Holthe (did not get the chance to perform a solo, since he didn't make it to the top 3)
  - Michelle Purvis
  - Eric Nærbø
- Winner:
  - Hanna Mjåvatn

== Contestants ==
Place	Full name	Name in competition	Dance style(s)	Elimination
1st	Hanna Filomen Gjessing Mjåvatn	Hanna	Modern/Contemporary/Ballet/Jazz	Top 1
2nd	Eric Christopher Nærbø	Eric	Hip-hop/Street dance	Top 2
3rd	Michelle Jeanine Gjesvold Purvis	Michelle	Jazz/Contemporary	Top 3
4th	Bjørn Wettre Holthe	Bjørn	Ballroom	Top 4
5th	Philip Olsen	Philip	Modern/Jazz/Contemporary	Top 6
5th	Alexandra Irena Joner	Alexandra	Hip-hop	Top 6
6th	Vegard Kristiansen	Vegard	Hip-hop/Jazz/Contemporary	Top 8
6th	Ellen Dybvik	Ellen	Classical ballet	Top 8
7th	Ole Petter Knarvik	Ole Petter	Breaking/Locking/Popping/Hip-hop	Top 10
7th	Marit Hagen Halvorsen	Marit	Hip-hop/Street dance/Jazz	Top 10
8th	Mona-Jeanette Berntsen	Mona	Hip-hop	Top 12 (withdrawn)
8th	Henrik Endre Jansen	Endre	Breaking	Top 12
9th	Navid Rezvani	Navid	Breaking	Top 14
9th	Anette Stokke	Anette	Ballroom	Top 14
10th	Lars Olav Eltervaag	Lars Olav	Ballroom	Top 16
10th	Sara Kristine Einbu	Sara	Hip-hop/Jazz	Top 16
11th	Hugo Hagström	Hugo	Hip-hop/Funk/Ballroom	Top 18
11th	Anett Amundsen	Anett	Contemporary/Jazz	Top 18
12th	Chenno Tim	Chenno	Breaking	Top 20
12th	Trine Lise Akselsen	Trine Lise	Ballroom	Top 20

=== Trine Lise Akselsen ===
Trine Lise Akselsen is a ballroom dancer from Bergen, Norway. Her partner were Chenno Tim, and the first week, they got jazz, and got in the bottom three. Then Akselsen performed a jive solo, and got eliminated together with Tim.

=== Anett Amundsen ===
Anett Amundsen is a jazz dancer. Her partner were Lars Olav Eltervaag, and the first week, they got salsa, and got in the bottom three. Then Amundsen performed a jazz solo, and both were safe. The second week, they got hip-hop, and also got in the bottom three. Then Amundsen performed a contemporary solo, and she got eliminated, but not Eltervaag.

=== Mona Berntsen ===
Mona-Jeanette Berntsen is a hip-hop dancer from Oslo, Norway. She is a member of the dance group Cre-8. In Dansefeber season 2, her first partner were Endre Jansen, and the first week, they got afro, and were safe. The second week, they got lyrical jazz, and were also safe. But the third week, they got locking, and ended up in the bottom three. Then Berntsen performed a hip-hop solo, and both were safe. The fourth week, they got jive, and were safe. The fifth week, Berntsen got a new partner, Ole Petter Knarvik, and they got new style hip-hop. Then they were both safe. But, when they performed the routine, Berntsen hurt her knee, and couldn't perform the next weeks. Then Michelle Purvis, which was the most recent female eliminated dancer, came in instead of Berntsen. Berntsen was able to compete in So You Think You Can Dance (Scandinavia) the next year, which she won. Berntsen also attended the Dansefeber tour 2007.

=== Ellen Dybvik ===
Ellen Dybvik is a ballerina. Her first partner were Bjørn Holthe, and the first week, they got hip-hop, and were safe. The second week they got contemporary jazz, and were also safe. The third week they got jazz, and were also safe. But the fourth week, they got hip-hop salsa, and got in the bottom three. Then Dybvik performed a jazzballet solo, and both were safe. The fifth week, Dybvik got a new partner, Philip Olsen, and they got musical, and both ended up in the bottom six. Then, Dybvik performed a jazzballet solo, and both were safe. The sixth week, Dybvik got Vegard Kristiansen as partner, and the styles disco and contemporary jazz, and Kristiansen were safe, but Dybvik ended up in the bottom four. Then, Dybvik performed a jazzballet solo, and were safe. The seventh week, Dybvik got Philip Olsen again as partner, and the styles hip-hop dancehall and musical, and both ended up in the bottom four. Then, Dybvik performed a funkjazzballet solo, and Olsen got through, but Dybvik got eliminated.

=== Sara Einbu ===
Sara Kristine Einbu is a hip-hop dancer from Bergen, Norway. She is a member of the dance group Schang. In the competition, her partner were Navid Rezvani, and the first week, they got afro, and were safe. The second week, they got cha-cha and were also safe. But the third week, they got jazz, and ended up in the bottom three. Then, Einbu performed a popping solo, and Rezvani were safe, but Einbu got eliminated. Einbu got high fever when the live-shows started, but she would not stop continuing in the competition.

=== Hugo Hagström ===
Hugo Hagström is a ballroom dancer from Sweden, living in Oslo, Norway. His partner were Anette Stokke, and the first week, they got salsa, and were crowned as one of the top 2 couples of the night, but ended up in the bottom three. Then, Hagström performed a funk solo, and both were safe. The second week, they got disco, and also got in the bottom three. Then, Hagström performed a funk solo, and Stokke were safe, but Hagström got eliminated. Later, Hagström attended the Dansefeber tour 2007.
