= Heart to Heart =

Heart to Heart or Heart 2 Heart may also refer to:

== Film and TV ==
- Heart to Heart (1928 film), a 1928 silent film
- Heart to Heart (1949 film), a 1949 documentary film
- Heart 2 Heart (film), a 2010 Indonesian film
- Heart to Heart (Norwegian TV series)
- Heart to Heart (South Korean TV series)
- Dil Se Dil Tak (lit. 'Heart To Heart'), an Indian TV series
- Heart to Heart, a novel in the High School Musical book series

== Music ==
- Heart 2 Heart (band), a short-lived Icelandic band that was active in 1992

=== Albums ===
- Heart to Heart (Jean Shepard album), 1968
- Heart to Heart (Reba McEntire album), 1981
- Heart to Heart (Elvin Jones album), 1980
- Heart to Heart (Merle Haggard and Leona Williams album), 1983
- Heart to Heart (Diane Schuur and B. B. King album), 1994
- Heart to Heart (Alan Broadbent album), 2012
- Heart 2 Heart (Kyla album), an album by Filipino singer Kyla
- Heart 2 Heart with Super Junior, a compilation album by Super Junior
- Heart to Heart (Raisa album), an album by Indonesian singer Raisa Andriana

=== Songs ===
- "Heart to Heart" (James Blunt song), 2014
- "Heart to Heart" (The Pointer Sisters song), June 1982
- "Heart to Heart" (Kenny Loggins song), November 1982
- "Heart to Heart", from the album 4Minutes Left, by 4Minute
- "Heart to Heart", from the album Here Comes the Cowboy, by Mac DeMarco
- "Heart to Heart", from the album Seasons of the Heart, by John Denver
- "Heart to Heart", from the album Aldo Nova, by Aldo Nova
- "Heart to Heart", from the album What About Me?, by Kenny Rogers

== Other uses ==
- Heart to Heart International, a humanitarian organization
- Herz zu Herz, a German patience game whose name means "Heart to Heart"
- Heart to Heart (horse), a racehorse

== See also ==
- Heart (disambiguation)
- Dil Ki Baat (disambiguation) (lit. 'Heart to Heart')
- Hart to Hart, an American TV series starring Robert Wagner and Stefanie Powers
- "Heart by Heart", a song from the film The Mortal Instruments: City of Bones by Demi Lovato
