= Your Forevers Don't Last Very Long =

Your Forevers Don't Last Very Long may refer to:

- Your Forevers (Don't Last Very Long), a 1967 song by Jean Shepard
- Your Forevers Don't Last Very Long (album), a 1967 album by Jean Shepard

== See also ==
- Yours Forever (disambiguation)
