= Hos Martin =

- Genre: Situation Comedy
- Created by: Bjarni Thorsson
- Starring: Sven Nordin; Henriette Lien; Nils Vogt; Bjørnar Teigen; Dagrun Anholt
- Country of origin: Norway
- Original language: Norwegian
- No. of seasons: 3
- No. of episodes: 39

Production
- Running time: 25 min

Original release
- Network: TV2
- Release: January 6, 2004 – December 29, 2005

Hos Martin (At Martin's) is a Norwegian situation comedy that premiered on TV2 on January 6, 2004.

== Plot ==
Martin (played by Sven Nordin), is an ordinary, uncomplicated man who runs his own café. He is married to Elisabeth (played by Henriette Lien), a determined and conservative woman who always has to have the last word. The other main character of the show is Lars; a theatre actor who makes regular appearances in the café.

== Cast ==
Role	Actor	Season
Martin	Sven Nordin	1-3
Elisabeth	Henriette Lien	1-2
Lars	Nils Vogt	1-3
Eva	Dagrun Anholt	1, 3
Stian	Svein Harry Hauge	2-3
Nora	Hege Schøyen	3
Lauritz	Bjørnar Teigen	1

== Episodes ==
Season	Number of episodes
Season 1	13
Season 2	13
Season 3	13

=== Season 1 ===
Number	Name	First aired
Episode 1	«Veddemålet»	January 6, 2004
Episode 2	«Inntrengeren»	January 13, 2004
Episode 3	«En gammel "god" venn»	January 20, 2004
Episode 4	«Bare si det»	January 27, 2004
Episode 5	«I overvektens tegn»	February 3, 2004
Episode 6	«Storrengjøring»	February 7, 2004
Episode 7	«Ikke i kveld, kjære»	February 27, 2004
Episode 8	«Buddhistmunkens eventyr»	March 2, 2004
Episode 9	«Hjemme hos»	March 9, 2004
Episode 10	«Hushjelp til besvær»	March 13, 2004
Episode 11	«Lykkelige omstendigheter»	March 20, 2004
Episode 12	«Tidens tann»	March 27, 2004
Episode 13	«Kjøttkaker og poesi»	March 30, 2004

=== Season 2 ===
Number	Name	First aired
Episode 1	«Min gode mann»	April 3, 2004
Episode 2	«Kvinner og klær»	September 14, 2004
Episode 3	«Middag for to»	September 21, 2004
Episode 4	«Du skjønner det bare ikke»	September 28, 2004
Episode 5	«Kokken»	October 5, 2004
Episode 6	«Pappa på prøve»	October 12, 2004
Episode 7	«Spørsmål om tillit»	October 19, 2004
Episode 8	«Overraskelsen»	October 26, 2004
Episode 9	«Tjukke slekta»	November 2, 2004
Episode 10	«Lakselorden»	November 9, 2004
Episode 11	«Presangen»	February 15, 2005
Episode 12	«Arven»	February 22, 2005
Episode 13	«Jeg elsker deg, men...»	September 6, 2005

=== Season 3 ===
Number	Name	First aired
Episode 1	«Tre gode venner»	September 13, 2005
Episode 2	«Guttedrømmer»	September 20, 2005
Episode 3	«VIP»	September 27, 2005
Episode 4	«Livet er til å dø av»	October 4, 2005
Episode 5	«Bestevenner»	October 11, 2005
Episode 6	«Hevnens Time»	October 18, 2005
Episode 7	«Farsfigur»	October 25, 2005
Episode 8	«Mammas valg...»	November 1, 2005
Episode 9	«Mors gutt»	November 8, 2005
Episode 10	«Venninnen....»	November 15, 2005
Episode 11	«Syk, sykere»	November 22, 2005
Episode 12	«Takeaway»	November 29, 2005
Episode 13	«Leiligheten»	November 29, 2005
