= Heart by Heart =

Heart by Heart may refer to:

- "Heart by Heart" (Demi Lovato song), 2013
- "Heart by Heart" (Joe Jonas song), 2025
