= Fantasy hockey =

Form of fantasy sport

Fantasy hockey is a form of fantasy sport where players build a team that competes with other players who do the same, based on the statistics generated by professional hockey players or teams. The majority of fantasy hockey pools are based on the teams and players of the ice hockey National Hockey League (NHL).

A typical fantasy hockey league or hockey pool, has 8–12 teams but often have as many as 20. Other types of pools may have a greater number of teams, which may dilute the average talent making it more or less fun depending on the league, but also represents more closely the actual NHL, which currently has 32 teams. Other forms of fantasy hockey may allow an unlimited number of teams, whereby any number of owners may draft the same player(s). These typically have a restricted number of "trades" where one player may simply be exchanged for any other in the player pool, typically of the same position.

== Rules ==
The most common way for choosing NHL players or teams to comprise a fantasy team is via a draft, either online or in person. However, the method ranges from basic (i.e., the draft has a predetermined number of rounds, and every team has a pick in each round, unless they have traded their picks) to complicated (i.e. 'auction' style).

Some leagues require an entry fee at the start of the season, with the league champion at the end of the year collecting some or all of the money. In other leagues, money is not involved at all and the league is simply for fun.

=== Team structure ===
Most office hockey pools keep the teams simple - merely choose 12 or 15 or 20 skaters from any position, most points win. However, fantasy hockey leagues usually use more complicated formats.

One common format of a fantasy team (rotisserie style) is:

- 2 centers (forward)
- 2 left wings (forward)
- 2 right wings (forward)
- 4 defensemen
- 2 goaltenders
- 5 bench players (who can play any position)

=== Point scoring ===
Common categories in which fantasy owners collect points include:

- Points
- Goals
- Assists
- Plus/Minus (+/-)
- Penalty Minutes
- Power Play Points
- Game-Winning Goals
- Faceoffs Won
- Shots On Goal
- Hits
- Blocked Shots
- Wins (Goalie)
- Goals Against Average (Goalie)
- Save Percentage (Goalie)
- Shutouts (Goalie)
- Hat Tricks

"Points" (which is goals plus assists) is the most common measure of a fantasy hockey team's performance. Some pools offer additional scoring based on the player's position (such as points for a goaltender victory) or skill level (such as points for penalties earned by an enforcer). Other pools have much higher levels of complexity, taking into account defensive statistics and +/-. When management of the participant's roster is required (i.e., activating certain players), this type of pool is often referred to as fantasy hockey.

==== Example ====
The most common scoring scheme is simply:

- 1 point per goal
- 1 point per assist
- 2 points per win
- 0 points per loss
- 1 point per OT loss

== Types of fantasy hockey leagues ==
=== Draft ===
There are two basic kinds of hockey pools: draft and non-draft. In a draft pool, no player can be held by more than one participant. All of the pool participants take turns drafting their players. (The drafts are usually held in serpentine fashion; that is, the team picking first in the odd rounds will pick last in the even rounds.) This type of pool requires considerable in-depth knowledge of players beyond the top tier of NHL stars.

In a non-draft pool, everyone simply picks a set number of players. Thus, multiple participants can have the same player among their set roster.

One variant of a non-draft pool is a "box-style" pool, where players of a similar caliber (i.e., forwards, defencemen, superstars, rookies) are grouped together and a fixed number of players are selected from each group or box.

A hockey pool can also be played using the NHL playoffs, Olympics, World Cup or World Championship tournaments. These pools are extremely popular as they are much shorter in length.

=== Head-to-Head ===
In a 'Head-to-Head' league fantasy owners attempt to win the most categories per week, with their weekly points to be added to their cumulative points total for the season. It is the only format that offers a bracket-style playoff format at the end of the regular season. At the end of the season, the teams with the most points make the playoffs (the number of playoff spots varies per league), with the team emerging from this successful being declared the league champion. In this format, the team that has the most points in the regular season does not always win in the playoffs. In fact, a much lower ranked team can win it all if they pull off an upset or two in the playoffs.

There is now a head-to-head points system, that combines the concepts of the two. It provides weekly match ups and opponents where each player tries to accumulate the most points. Points are earned from each stat, which are individually assigned a specific amount. For instance, a goal could be worth 3 points and an assist worth 2 points. Each game will see one win awarded and one loss awarded, except in the event that the competing teams tie in points scored for the week.

Going away from the "points" subsection of head-to-head scoring systems, there are two popular options that use weekly head-to-head match ups and score categories.

The first is commonly referred to as "head-to-head most categories." In leagues that employ this system, each matchup will be contested between two teams, each of which are simply trying to win more scoring categories than its opponent in an effort to get the win for that week. For instance, if a fantasy hockey league uses 13 scoring categories, and Team A wins 8 of those categories to Team B's 5, then Team A will get the win and go 1-0 for the week. Team B will have lost and take an 0-1 record from that week.

The second categorical head-to-head fantasy hockey scoring system is commonly referred to as "head-to-head each category." While two leagues can use exactly the same scoring categories, team records and finish in the league standings can (and almost always will) be very different between the H2H Most and H2H Each systems. This is because in H2H Each leagues, every individual category represents a 'game' to be won or lost in the standings. So, in our example from the paragraph above, if Team A wins 8 categories to Team B's 5 over the week that they play against each other, Team A will have earned an 8-5 record for the week, while Team B will have earned a 5-8 record. This makes for a couple notable differences: 1) it creates wider gaps in the standings as the season progresses, 2) it puts an onus on battling for every single category, rather than creating a situation in which winning the most categories is impossible by mid-week and offering owners no incentive to play out the string, 3) it rewards dominance and proficiency in the most categories. To cite a well-known example, think of it in college football terms. Head-to-head most categories leagues require only that you win the week, no matter the score. Head-to-head each category leagues require that you win the week by as many categories as possible, because a team's record is tied to what would otherwise be considered the score of the game.

There are advantages to each system, and commissioners should consider what kind of a league they want to create for their team owners. In short, the pros and cons of each head-to-head system are as follows:

Head-to-head most categories - The benefit is in the simplicity and also in the parity within the standings. More teams remain in realistic playoff contention longer, because it is easier to make up what would constitute a full game in the standings. The drawback is that teams can load up on half of the categories while leaving the others to chance and still end up winning most games despite possibly not being the most well-rounded team in a rotisserie sense. Another serious drawback to H2H Most Categories leagues is that once it becomes apparent during the week which team will win the most categories, there becomes no incentive to keep up, because a loss is a loss no matter the final score. This can result in the losing manager not setting his lineup in the last few days of the week. Since fantasy hockey was invented for Saturday nights, the busiest night of the NHL schedule, this can leave much to be desired.

Head-to-head each category - The benefit is that the standings should most closely reflect a rotisserie type of overall team strength, with the caveat that the opponent is different every week (rotisserie leagues have no head-to-head match ups and therefore no opponents). Another benefit is the incentive to battle hard for any and all categories that are within reach near the end of the week, by choosing to start players based on which ones are likely to perform best in those specific categories. The drawbacks are that it is not a true rotisserie league, so the possibility of the best team not winning still exists, and also that the better teams can run up the scores regularly and create much separation in the standings. Some owners are not equipped to continue giving their all when they see a record of 30-50, but might otherwise see a record of 3-5 as simply two games under .500.

Head-to-head points - The benefit is that the league can decide how much weight it wants to give to certain actions, or what would be called "categories" in the other leagues. A common complaint about head-to-head category leagues is that it places too much or too little importance on certain aspects of the game of hockey. By assigning a point value to everything that would otherwise be its own equally weighted category, the competitors can decide what kind of players they want to value the highest. The drawback to this setting is that games can frequently get out of hand by the weekend, thus again causing an atmosphere of indifference among many league members during what is supposed to be the most exciting time of the week.

=== Daily Fantasy Hockey ===
Daily fantasy hockey is a new niche in the fantasy sports industry. Like traditional fantasy sports, players draft a team of real world athletes who then score fantasy points according to set scoring rules. However instead of being stuck with the same team through a whole season, daily fantasy sports contests last just one day. Daily fantasy sports is quicker and more numbers-driven. Daily fantasy sports websites do not compete for the same players as traditional sports games, but instead market themselves as complementing traditional fantasy sports. Casual fans enjoy daily fantasy hockey leagues because they do not require continued attention from team owners in order for said owners to achieve. A small fee is usually required to enter these contests, with a significantly higher jackpot for the winner. However, the number of participants is often in the hundreds or even thousands.

Daily fantasy sports have faced criticism for their similarity to sports betting. The structure and payouts of daily fantasy games have been described as providing a feeling of "instant gratification" to its players, similar to that of online gambling.

=== Points ===
A "Points" league is one of the most simple and easy systems for beginners to fantasy hockey. Owners begin each season by selecting a team of a pre-determined number of players to fill different roles on the team. The most used positions for a points league are: centers, right wing, left wing, defense, goalie, rookie and enforcer. Respectively each of the different positions accumulate points differently. For example a forward may score points by goals and assists, whereas an enforcer will score points on penalty minutes and hits. Instead of owners competing against a single other team, like in head-to-head, owners gain points throughout the year for their players real time stats and is reflected in the owner's team total. For instance, if for every goal scored in real life, one point is awarded to the respective team, and a player scores 25 goals, then the team will have 25 points for that player. Points are awarded for each of the categories and can be changed by the Commissioner of the league. Points leagues can also be combined with a "keeper leagues" format.

=== Rotisserie ===
A 'Rotisserie' league is one in which teams are ranked in order from best to worst. In a ten-team league with ten categories, the maximum number of points a team can earn is 100 (by finishing 1st in each category). The least is ten, by finishing last and collecting only one point per category. Rotisserie leagues are likely the most strategic type of fantasy pool and reward managers whose team has strong, balanced scoring across all categories.

=== Express League ===
An 'Express League' offers contests with shorter time frames than traditional season-long fantasy leagues. The rules are usually the same as the 'Points' league. Games time frame could be from one day to one week or even more sometime.

== Keeper Leagues ==
Any fantasy hockey pool that "rolls over" into future years is called a "Keeper" or "Dynasty" league. The leagues can be run each year in any of the above formats with a winner declared at the end of each season. At the end of the year team managers decide which players they wish to protect (the number varies - from protecting and keeping all players, to keeping as few as three or four players). Before the next NHL season begins, a fantasy draft is held to fill out the rest of the roster.

Many keeper leagues, as well as some single season leagues, have adopted salary cap rules similar to the NHL. In a "Salary Cap League", a salary is assigned to each player before the manager selects his team. Salaries are usually determined by the NHL player's real salary. Otherwise a number value is assigned - usually by an online hockey pool program - or it is determined through an auction process. Each manager must ensure that they do not go over the predefined salary cap when selecting players.

Some leagues have also introduced a rookie draft into their fantasy league. By using the rankings from the last season to determine the draft order, last place gets 1st pick and so on. In most leagues trading picks is also allowed.

== Running a hockey pool ==
For a typical hockey pool, there are hundreds of statistical updates occurring every night. Updating statistics accurately and on a timely basis is usually handled by hockey pool software or via an online hockey pool manager like HockeyDraft.ca or OfficePools.com

== Simulated Fantasy Hockey ==
A variant of fantasy hockey that does not rely on day-to-day real world player statistics is simulated fantasy hockey.

In a simulated fantasy hockey league, each team owner builds a roster of players who are represented by a set of ratings for attributes such as scoring prowess and passing ability. The assembled rosters then compete in simulated head-to-head matchups, with the outcome determined by the attributes of the players. Simulation of those games can be conducted manually or using specialized computer software. Because the games are simulated, they do not require any real-world hockey leagues to be in-season, meaning simulated fantasy hockey can be played year-round.

Each simulated hockey league has its own rules for player acquisition, scheduling, and for determining player ratings. While many leagues are focused on active NHL players, some leagues opt to not use real-world players at all, assigning ratings to fictional players, while others build their rosters from historical players.

== History ==
One of the first known fantasy hockey leagues was formed in 1981 by Jay Arbour (son of legendary New York Islanders Coach Al Arbour) and Neil Smith (who served as GM of the NY Rangers from 1989–2000). The league also included sportscasters Howie Rose and Sam Rosen, among others.

The longest documented continuously run hockey pool was formed in 1980 by a group of students from Handsworth Secondary School in North Vancouver, Canada. Known as the "Handsworth Alumni Hockey Pool", it is now in its 47th year of existence as of the 2026/2027 NHL Season. The only year the pool was not active was during the 2004-2005 NHL Season, which was cancelled due to a labour dispute.
