= A Real Good Woman =

Studio album by Jean Shepard
- Released: October 1968
- Recorded: March 1968
- Studio: Columbia (Nashville, Tennessee)
- Genre: Country
- Label: Capitol
- Producer: Billy Graves

Jean Shepard chronology
Heart to Heart (1968)	A Real Good Woman (1968)	I'll Fly Away (1969)

Singles from A Real Good Woman
- 1. "An Old Bridge" Released: January 1968; 2. "A Real Good Woman" Released: May 1968

A Real Good Woman is a studio album by American country singer Jean Shepard. It was released in October 1968 by Capitol Records and was her twelfth studio album. It consisted of 12 tracks, two of which were originally singles: "An Old Bridge" and the title track. The latter was a top 40 single on the US country chart. A Real Good Woman received positive reviews by music publications following its release.

== Background, recording and content ==
Jean Shepard first rose to country music stardom in the 1950s and would have 20 years of chart records. In the 1950s honky tonk era, she had top ten singles with "A Dear John Letter" and "A Satisfied Mind". During the 1960s, her career regained momentum with further top ten singles like "Second Fiddle (To an Old Guitar)" and "If Teardrops Were Silver". During sixties alone, Shepard had 15 US top 40 country singles. A Real Good Woman was among her studio albums released during the 1960s. Recorded with producer Billy Graves, sessions were held in March 1968 at the Columbia Studios in Nashville, Tennessee. A Real Good Woman consisted of 12 tracks. Included were two songs written by Mel Tillis: "All Right (I'll Sign the Papers)" and "All the Time". Also featured was Tom Paxton's "The Last Thing on My Mind".

== Release, critical reception, chart performance and singles ==
A Real Good Woman was released by Capitol Records in October 1968. It was distributed as a vinyl LP and an 8-track cartridge, with six songs on each side of the record. It marked the twelfth album of Shepard's career. Shepard's vocal delivery received a positive reception from music publications. Billboard wrote, "The distinctive style of Jean Shepard makes virtually every one of these cuts and outstanding performance." Record World rated it four stars and commented, "Jean Shepard is not only a real good woman, she is a real good vocalist, a fact this album attests to."

It was given a three out of five star rating from AllMusic.A Real Good Woman became Shepard's eighth studio album to make the US Billboard Top Country Albums, reaching number 32 in 1968. Two singles were included on the disc. "An Old Bridge" was originally issued in January 1968 and reached number 52 on the US country songs chart. It was followed in May 1968 by the title track, which reached number 32 on the US country songs chart.

== Track listing ==
Side one
No.	Title	Writer(s)	Length
1.	"A Real Good Woman"	Johnnie & Jonie Mosby	2:24
2.	"An Old Bridge"	Hank Mills	2:17
3.	"Walk Out of My Mind"	Red Lane	2:19
4.	"My World Is You"	Warner "Mack" McPherson; Bandy Keith	2:48
5.	"All Right (I'll Sign the Papers)"	Mel Tillis	2:20
6.	"The Last Thing on My Mind"	Tom Paxton	2:18

Side two
No.	Title	Writer(s)	Length
1.	"Take Me to Your World"	Billy Sherrill; Glenn Sutton	2:48
2.	"Just for You"	Curly Putnam; Larry Butler	2:13
3.	"All the Time"	Tillis; Wayne P. Walker	2:32
4.	"The Trouble with Girls"	Ted Harris	2:29
5.	"Take Me as I Am"	Boudleaux Bryant	2:45
6.	"Promises, Promises"	Smith; Huey; Anderson	2:11

== Chart performance ==
Chart (1968)	Peak position
US Top Country Albums (Billboard)	32

== Release history ==
Region	Date	Format	Label	Ref.
North America	October 1968	Vinyl LP (Stereo); Vinyl LP (Stereo Club Edition); 8-track cartridge	Capitol Records	
