= Dil Ki Baat =

Dil Ki Baat (lit. 'Heart to Heart' in Hindi-Urdu) may refer to:

- Dil Ki Baat (Hariharan album), 1989 album by Indian singer Hariharan
- Dil Ki Baat (Junaid Jamshed album), 2001 album by Pakistani singer Junaid Jamshed

== See also ==
- Heart to Heart (disambiguation)
