= Sérgio Benvindo Júnior =

Swedish dancer

Sérgio Benvindo Júnior, born 1989, is a Swedish contemporary dancer. Born in Brazil, he moved to Västerås when he was 7 years old. Lives in Stockholm. He first began to dance disco. Later he danced a lot of contemporary and jazz dance.

== So You Think You Can Dance — Scandinavia ==
Júnior tried out for the show So You Think You Can Dance — Scandinavia 2008. He auditioned in Stockholm to "Alibi" by David Gray and made it straight to the workshop. From the workshop, he made it to the top 24 where he tried dancing with Mona-Jeanette Berntsen, Emma Hedlund, Trinh Nguyen, Siv Gaustad, Martin Gæbe and Daniel Koivunen, with such dance styles as Afro-Cuban Rumba, Show, Salsa, Broadway, Contemporary, Hip-hop, Cha cha cha, Jazz and Disco.

Week	Partner	Style	Music	Choreographer	Results
2	Mona-Jeanette Berntsen	Afro-Cuban Rumba	"Echa Pa'Lante"—Thalía	Ibiroqai Regueria; Marina Prada	Safe
3	Mona-Jeanette Berntsen	Show	"Hit & Run Holiday"—My Life with the Thrill Kill Kult	Roine Söderlundh	Safe
4	Mona-Jeanette Berntsen	Salsa	"Meñique Mañigua (DJ Duste Remix)"—DJ Duste	Jazzy	Safe
4		Solo (contemporary)	"This Year's Love"—David Gray	Sergio Benvindo Junior	Safe
5	Emma Hedlund	Broadway	"Big Time"—Linda Eder	Toni Ferraz	Safe
5	Emma Hedlund	Contemporary	"Talk to Me"—Gudny Aspaas	Tine Aspaas	Safe
6	Trinh Nguyen	Hip-hop	"I Am Music"—Common	Toniah Pedersen	Safe
6	Trinh Nguyen	Cha cha cha	"When Doves Cry"—Prince	Jan Ivar Lund	Safe
6		Solo (contemporary)	"All That I Am"—Rob Thomas	Sergio Benvindo Junior	Safe
7	Siv Gaustad	Jazz	"Mercy"—Duffy	Toni Ferraz	Safe
7	Siv Gaustad	Disco	"Jump (for My Love)"—Girls Aloud	Tomas Glans	Safe
7		Solo (jazz)	"Glow"—Nelly Furtado	Sergio Benvindo Junior	Safe
8	Emma Hedlund	Contemporary	"Beatrice"—Daniel Lanois	Anja Gaardbo	Top 6
8	Daniel Koivunen; Martin Gæbe	Contemporary	"Starfuckers, Inc."—Nine Inch Nails	Tine Aspaas	Top 6

- Green note means bottom three/six
- Black note means no partners
