= A Real Good Woman (song) =

Single by Jean Shepard

from the album A Real Good Woman
- B-side: "The Trouble with Girls"
- Released: May 1968
- Recorded: March 1968
- Studio: Columbia (Nashville, Tennessee)
- Genre: Country
- Length: 2:24
- Label: Capitol
- Songwriter(s): Johnnie & Jonie Mosby
- Producer(s): Billy Graves

Jean Shepard singles chronology
"An Old Bridge" (1968)	"A Real Good Woman" (1968)	"Everyday's a Happy Day for Fools" (1968)

"A Real Good Woman" is a song that was originally recorded by American country singer Jean Shepard. Released as a single in 1968, it reached the top 40 of the US country songs chart. It was later included on an album of the same name.

== Background and recording ==
Jean Shepard first found success during the honky tonk era of country music in the 1950s. In the mid-1960s, she had a commercial comeback which allowed for 15 of her singles to reach the country top 40 during the decade. One of her top 40 songs was "A Real Good Woman". The song was composed by Johnnie and Jonie Mosby. The recording was produced by Billy Graves in March 1968 at Nashville, Tennessee's Columbia Studios.

== Release, critical reception and chart performance ==
"A Real Good Woman" was released as a single by Capitol Records in March 1967. It was distributed as a seven-inch vinyl single. On its B-side was the song "The Trouble with Girls". In May 1968, Billboard magazine highlighted the song and predicted that it would soon enter their country singles chart. Later that year, "A Real Good Woman" would reach the US Billboard Hot Country Songs chart, rising to the number 32 position. It was then included in Shepard's 1968 studio album of the same name.

== Track listings ==
7" vinyl single

- "A Real Good Woman" – 2:24
- "The Trouble with Girls" – 2:29

== Charts ==
Weekly chart performance for "A Real Good Woman"
Chart (1968)	Peak position
US Hot Country Songs (Billboard)	32
