= Hansel & Gretel: Witch Hunters (soundtrack) =

Hansel & Gretel: Witch Hunters – Music from the Motion Picture

Film score by Atli Örvarsson
- Released: January 22, 2013
- Recorded: 2012–2013
- Studios: Sony Scoring Stage, Culver City, California
- Genres: Orchestral; electronic; jazz; rock; heavy metal; choir
- Length: 47:43
- Label: Paramount Music
- Producers: Atli Örvarsson; Hans Zimmer (exec.); David Fleming (additional)

Atli Örvarsson chronology
The Eagle (2011)	Hansel & Gretel: Witch Hunters (2013)	The Mortal Instruments: City of Bones (2013)

Hansel & Gretel: Witch Hunters – Music from the Motion Picture is the score album to the 2013 film of the same name directed by Tommy Wirkola. The film features a musical score written by Hans Zimmer's protégé and Icelandic composer Atli Örvarsson. Zimmer also worked on the soundtrack as an executive music producer. The score which was recorded at the Sony Scoring Stage in Culver City, California, featured electronic, rock and heavy metal music blended with traditional and orchestral elements.

The soundtrack was released digitally by Paramount Music on January 22, 2013. A physical soundtrack album was released on January 29, 2013 from La-La Land Records. The score received negative response from critics, who criticised the heavy-metal and rock infusions, lack of variations and originality in the film music, with critics noting the inspiration of the score from Zimmer's work in Sherlock Holmes.

== Background ==
Örvarsson had previously scored Season of the Witch so initially he was "a bit apprehensive" to work on another witchcraft film but was "too fond of the story to say no and found Tommy Wirkola's take on the subject matter to be very refreshing." He felt the similarities of the scores would be what all fantasy scores would have in common, which is "to create a specific 'world' with the music, which helps greatly with getting the audience to suspend belief". Örvarsson found it easier to collaborate with Wirkola due to their shared Nordic heritage and said that their discussions about the music for the film "might have had some of the most cold and dark humor of any Hollywood music meetings."

The biggest challenge, according to Örvarsson was to fulfill Wirkola's vision to make the score "extremely modern", but at the same time to retain the "fairy tale magic". Throughout the score, Örvarsson wanted to make the audience invested in Hansel and Gretel's relationship as siblings. He also created a theme for their mother called "White Magic", and a "brash score" to celebrate their victories as witch hunters. He also created a theme for Muriel—the antagonist, which was a "chromatic chord progression that's interspersed through the score"; there is also a score for the good-kind witches, who practice "white magic". For the large action set pieces, he used a rock-and-roll type music not assigned for the witches. He initially wrote the main title lastly, as to gather elements into the score before uniting the theme. For Edward the troll, he used a "Nordic lullaby" as he was a naive character, and for the evil sheriff, he used an industrial theme. Then, he also wrote few small motifs that enhance the story.

The score is blended with both historic instruments, such as harpsichord, contrabass flute and modern instruments such as electric guitar and electronic percussion. For the orchestral music, he used more bass instruments, to create a "modern sounding score that was almost rooted in the classical way", which he described it as a Baroque n'Roll musical style. For the "Black metal" sequence, he used heavy metal guitars, as he was familiar with the sequence throughout his research. He added that "there are some indirect musical influences there, but it certainly was not a focal point". The song "Bundy" by Norwegian rock band Animal Alpha is used during the film's end credits, but is not included on the film's soundtrack.

== Track listing ==
No.	Title	Length
1.	"The Witch Hunters"	2:29
2.	"Business Is Good"	2:11
3.	"Trolls Serve Witches"	3:33
4.	"Lost Children Crying, Vol. 2"	2:33
5.	"You Do the Bleeding"	3:34
6.	"There Are Good Witches in the World"	4:11
7.	"This Place Could Use a Bit of Color"	4:17
8.	"Goodbye Muriel"	3:21
9.	"Don't Eat the Candy"	3:48
10.	"Burn 'Em All"	5:03
11.	"White Magic"	1:52
12.	"Shoot Anything That Moves"	3:29
13.	"The Fairy Tale"	2:53
14.	"Augsburg Burns"	4:20

== Reception ==
Critical reception to the score was generally negative. The Mary Sue-based Zoe Chevat wrote that "the score swings wildly between playing it straight and bold-faced tackiness" and added that "the soundtrack moves from ethereal choir singing in orchestral pieces, to screeching heavy-metal guitar riffs, often within the space of a single scene." The Prague Reporter's Jason Pirodsky and Inside Pulse's Travis Leamons referred that the score is heavily inspired on [Hans] Zimmer's work in the Sherlock Holmes film series. James Southall of Movie Wave panned the score, saying "You'd get your money's worth of entertainment if Örvarsson had fashioned the whole score like that, but sadly from track two onwards it's standard Remote Control stuff, generic action music dominated by electronics and guitars and sadly not featuring the kind of melodic hooks that sometimes elevate such scores into guilty pleasure territory [...] At times it's very hard to believe that you're listening to music written for a major Hollywood film rather than some sort of student project – there's no dramatic drive, no invention, and hearing the synthetic strings in unison playing an attempt at a power anthem is pretty cringeworthy." Despite the reception, the score was shortlisted as one among the 114 original scores for potential nominations at the 86th Academy Awards in the Best Original Score category, though being not nominated.

== Charts ==
Chart (2013)	Peak position
UK Soundtrack Albums (OCC)	48
US Soundtrack Albums (Billboard)	25

== Personnel ==
Credits adapted from CD liner notes

- Composer and producer– Atli Örvarsson
- Additional music – David Fleming
- Executive producer – Hans Zimmer
- Music co-ordinator – Jason Richmond
- Recording – Greg Loskorn, Lori Castro, Adam Olmsted
- Mixing – Dennis Sands
- Editing – John Finklea
- Sound design – Clay Duncan, Jörg Hüttner
- Copyist – Hillary Thomas, Junko Tamura, Nicholas Petrillo, Rinna Lee, Robert Rosario, Thanh Tran, Tina Tamura, Claudio Olachea

Instruments

- Bass – Bruce Morgenthaler, Christian Kollgaard, David Parmeter, Don Ferrone*, Drew Dembowski, Oscar Hidalgo, Susan Ranney, Nico Abondolo
- Bassoon – Ken Munday, Rose Corrigan
- Cello – Andrew Shulman, Cecilia Tsan, Tina Soule, Dane Little, David Speltz, Dennis Karmazyn, Erika Duke-Kirkpatrick, Giovanna Clayton, John Walz, Paula Hochhalter, Trevor Handy, Vanessa Freebairn-Smith, Armen Ksajikian
- Flute – Heather Clark, Geri Rotella
- Harp – Jo Ann Turovsky
- Horn – Daniel Kelley, David Duke, Jenny Kim, Joseph Meyer, Mark Adams, Phillip Edward Yao, Jim Thatcher
- Percussion – Alex Acuña, MB Gordy III, Matt Chamberlain, Satnam Ramgotra, Bob Zimmitti
- Trombone – Alex Iles, Bill Reichenbach, Phillip Teele, Steve Holtman, Bill Booth
- Tuba – Doug Tornquist, Gary Hickman
- Viola – Alma Fernandez, Andrew Duckles, Carolyn Riley, Darrin McCann, David Walther, Jennie Hansen, Keith Greene, Laura Pearson, Matthew Funes, Michael Nowak, Pamela Jacobson, Shawn Mann, Victoria Miskolczy, Brian Dembow
- Violin – Alyssa Park, Belinda Broughton, Dimitrie Leivici, Eun-Mee Ahn, Helen Nightengale, Irina Voloshina, Jackie Brand, Jay Rosen, Josefina Vergara, Katia Popov, Kevin Connolly, Marc Sazer, Maya Magub, Miwako Watanabe, Natalie Leggett, Rafael Rishik, Sara Parkins, Serena McKinney, Songa Lee, Tamara Hatwan, Tereza Stanislav, Yelena Yegoryan, Julie Gigante

Orchestra

- Orchestra – The Hollywood Studio Symphony
- Orchestration – Larry Rench, Dr. Penka Kouneva, Philip Klein
- Assistance – David Marquette, Mark Eshelman
- Conductor – Atli Örvarsson
- Contractor – Peter Rotter
- Concertmaster – Bruce Dukov

Management

- Soundtrack executive producer – Randy Spendlove
- Executive in charge of music – Dan Goldwasser, MV Gerhard, Matt Verboys
- Liner notes – Atli Örvarsson, Tommy Wirkola
- Music production service – Steven Kofsky
