= I Don't See How I Can Make It =

Single by Jean Shepard

from the album Heart to Heart
- B-side: "Enough Heart to Hurt"
- Released: August 1967
- Recorded: July 1967
- Studio: Columbia (Nashville, Tennessee)
- Genre: Country
- Length: 2:25
- Label: Capitol
- Songwriter(s): George Richey
- Producer(s): Billy Graves

Jean Shepard singles chronology
"Your Forevers (Don't Last Very Long)" (1967)	"I Don't See How I Can Make It" (1967)	"An Old Bridge" (1968)

"I Don't See How I Can Make It" is a song written by George Richey that was originally recorded by American country singer Jean Shepard. Released as a single in 1967, it reached the top 40 of the US country songs chart.

== Background and recording ==
After rising to country music stardom in the 1950s, Jean Shepard's popularity waned by the late 1950s. Then in 1964, she returned with the comeback single "Second Fiddle (To an Old Guitar)". This would launch a series of follow-up singles, 15 of which reached the top 40 into 1970. One of her chart records was "I Don't See How I Can Make It". The song's story line described the feelings over losing a romantic partner. It was composed by George Richey and produced by Billy Graves. The song was recorded in July 1967 at Nashville, Tennessee's Columbia Studios in September 1965.

== Release, critical reception and chart performance ==
"I Don't See How I Can Make It" was released by Capitol Records as a single in August 1967. It was distributed as a seven-inch vinyl single. On its B-side was the song "Enough Heart to Hurt". It was given a positive reviews from publications. Cash Box who wrote, "The ditty showcases Jean at her best and is a sure bet for top chart honors." Billboard called it "strong ballad material" combined with "fine production work". The song was later included on Shepard's 1968 studio album Heart to Heart. The single reached the top 40 on the US Billboard Hot Country Songs chart, peaking at the number 40 position in 1967.

== Track listings ==
7" vinyl single

- "I Don't See How I Can Make It" – 2:25
- "Enough Heart to Hurt" – 2:27

== Charts ==
Weekly chart performance for "I Don't See How I Can Make It"
Chart (1967)	Peak position
US Hot Country Songs (Billboard)	40
