= The Mortal Instruments: City of Bones (soundtrack) =

2013 urban fantasy film soundtrack

The Mortal Instruments: City of Bones (Original Motion Picture Soundtrack)

Soundtrack album by Various artists
- Released: August 20, 2013
- Recorded: 2013
- Genres: Pop; EDM; indie pop; alternative rock
- Length: 52:59
- Label: Republic

The Mortal Instruments chronology
The Mortal Instruments: City of Bones (Original Motion Picture Soundtrack) (2013)	Shadowhunters (2017)

Singles from The Mortal Instruments: City of Bones (Original Motion Picture Soundtrack)
- 1. "When the Darkness Comes" Released: July 9, 2013; 2. "Almost Is Never Enough" Released: August 19, 2013

The Mortal Instruments: City of Bones (Original Motion Picture Score)

Film score by Atli Örvarsson
- Released: August 20, 2013
- Recorded: 2013
- Genre: Film score
- Length: 1:03:42
- Label: Milan
- Producer: Atli Örvarsson

Atli Örvarsson chronology
Hansel & Gretel: Witch Hunters (2013)	The Mortal Instruments: City of Bones (2013)	A Single Shot (2013)

The Mortal Instruments: City of Bones is a 2013 urban fantasy film based on the first book of The Mortal Instruments series by Cassandra Clare, directed by Harald Zwart, with a script written by Jessica Postigo. The film stars Lily Collins, Jamie Campbell Bower, Robert Sheehan, Kevin Zegers, Lena Headey, Kevin Durand, Aidan Turner, Jemima West, Godfrey Gao, C. C. H. Pounder, Jared Harris, and Jonathan Rhys Meyers. The musical score was composed by Icelandic composer Atli Örvarsson. The film featured two soundtracks: an original soundtrack and an original score. Both the albums were released on August 20, 2013, a day before the film's release. The original soundtrack, released by Republic Records, featured songs performed by Ariana Grande, Zedd, Demi Lovato, Colbie Caillat, AFI, Nathan Sykes amongst several others. Two original songs were also recorded for the film. The score album, published by Milan Records, featured the musical cues from Örvarsson's score.

== Production ==
Örvarsson was hired to score for City of Bones after Harald Zwart, the film's director was impressed with the musical score he created for Hansel & Gretel: Witch Hunters. For preparing for a fantasy based score, he referred to Johann Sebastian Bach's compositions on noting the script and added "If you're going to steal you might as well steal from the best and he is arguably the best Western composer of all time, so that was a good place to start. My job is to lend the characters and the story emotion and also importance. I felt that the most important thing I could do was to make all these events that are outlandish seem important and personal." He was given nearly 9 weeks to score the entire movie, for which he described it as "time is relative in the sense that if you have a good relationship and an understanding about the aesthetics that clicks with the director, having a limited amount of time can be a blessing because you don't have time to second-guess every decision".

The score was composed entirely in computer, while the recording happened at Abbey Road Studios, London, featuring a 100-piece orchestra, a 40-member choir and other instrumentalists and vocalists, present for the sessions, that took place in 7 days. Since the film, is a modern-day setting with sort of "ancient background", he used some of the older instruments.

On writing an action film score that featured a female lead, he said "There's a feminine element that wouldn't be present if it was a guy. In Hansel and Gretel: Witch Hunters, there's a guy and a girl. The presence of a female character made that dynamic different. Mortal Instruments even more so because the hero is a girl. I'm not going to write the same thing for a girl hero as a guy. Men and women just function differently. There's a different core there. As much as I'm all about equality of the sexes but we have to celebrate the differences."

== Composition ==
For the "mortal cup theme", he used a viol (a predecessor to violin and cello), which he said "It's a string instrument, which is bowed, and it's actually played without any vibrato, so it's a very kind of metallic sound to it. And it has that sort of ancient feel to it. It was very prominent during the Renaissance, during the 1400 and 1500s, that was the string instrument. It's got this really piercing, clean ancient sound to it. It's gives a real nice subtle color of ancient times." Another melody themes that was written for the score is the "Clary's theme". Örvarsson described the main title theme as "It's the legend of the Shadowhunters and their history and all that, and we're trying to depict or convey Clary's awe, the experience of seeing this magnificent city that we don't really see. The beginning of that piece, when they're walking into that underground bunker, that has its own rhythmic thing, and it all has its big crescendo when the Silent Brothers are able to rekindle her memory."

For Clary and Jace's love theme, he used a simple piano version, preceded by a string arrangement and a major and minor key version. He also wrote the sparse version of the love theme in the greenhouse sequence, set through Jace's story, where he used piano and bells in the cue, and blended into Demi Lovato's song "Heart by Heart" written by Diane Warren. He wrote a "Darth Vader-like theme" for the Valentine, which is like "a bass line that keeps building and building". The sound engineer Lewis Jones rented a Minimoog synthesiser, and insisted to play the bass on the old synthesiser, which got an "old, fast bass sound". He also wrote a melodic theme for Clary and her reunion with his mother. Jace's character did not have a theme, but had an action motif.

For the scene featuring in a modern-day club, at the end, the music shifts from a club track to morph into the score piece. Örvarsson wrote few string music for the tracks to co-exist or merge with the score. Zwart also played all the Bach piano music in the film. Besides composing one of the songs, Zedd also produced the score for a primary sequence in the film.

== Release ==
The soundtrack was officially announced on July 2, 2013, by Republic Records, that initially consisted of 12 tracks. The featuring artists included Demi Lovato, Zedd, Colbie Caillat, AFI, Jessie J, Myon & Shane 54, Seven Lions, Tove Lo, Bryan Ellis, Brian West, whose popular songs were incorporated into the album. Few songs, including Lovato's "Heart by Heart" and Caillat's "When the Darkness Comes" were specially recorded for the film. The latter was released as a promotional single on July 9. Another single, titled "Magnetic", performed by Jessie J was leaked on August 8, before the official release.

Ariana Grande and Nathan Sykes of The Wanted, collaborated for the promotional single "Almost Is Never Enough". It was released on August 19, 2013 and debuted at number 84 on the Billboard Hot 100; a music video, featuring Grande and Sykes, accompanied the single. The soundtrack album was officially released in stores and digital retailers on August 20, a day before the theatrical release. The album peaked at #32 on the US Billboard 200. The same day, the score album was also released by Milan Records, for physical purchase and digital download/streaming.

Scandal's "Rainy" is the theme song for the Japanese release of the film.

== Track listing ==
=== Soundtrack ===
No.	Title	Performer(s)	Length
1.	"Into the Lair"	Zedd	1:44
2.	"Almost Is Never Enough" (Soundtrack version)	Ariana Grande; Nathan Sykes	3:30
3.	"17 Crimes" (LA Riots remix)	AFI	4:43
4.	"Heart by Heart"	Demi Lovato	3:43
5.	"Bring Me Home"	Youngblood Hawke	3:02
6.	"When the Darkness Comes"	Colbie Caillat	4:16
7.	"Strangers"	Seven Lions; Myon & Shane 54; Tove Lo	6:02
8.	"Magnetic"	Jessie J	3:55
9.	"Without You Now"	Austin Mahone	3:46
10.	"Bear"	Pacific Air	3:36
11.	"All About Us"	He is We; Owl City	3:26
12.	"Calling from Above" (Edit)	Bassnectar	1:57
13.	"Start a Riot"	Jetta	4:14
14.	"Strange Days"	Bryan Ellis	5:45
Total length:			52:59

=== Score ===
No.	Title	Length
1.	"Clary's Theme"	3:22
2.	"City Of Bones"	3:40
3.	"Your Secret Is Safe"	2:52
4.	"The Clave's Curse"	3:18
5.	"Pretty Far From Brooklyn"	2:32
6.	"Close The Dome"	2:54
7.	"The Mortal Cup"	2:56
8.	"The Angel Rune"	4:06
9.	"Madame Dorothea"	3:11
10.	"Magnus Bane"	2:50
11.	"Demon Doll"	2:38
12.	"Where's The Cup?"	3:47
13.	"You're A Morgenstern"	4:02
14.	"J.C."	2:39
15.	"She's Not A Mundane"	2:24
16.	"Valentine"	3:52
17.	"Midnight In The Garden"	2:15
18.	"Vampires And Werewolves"	4:31
19.	"Mortal Instruments – The Opening" (Bonus track)	3:31
20.	"The Portal" (Bonus track)	2:21
Total length:		63:42

== Reception ==
Writing for the Associated Press, Cristina Jaleru had stated "the soundtrack manages to encapsulate the spirit of the story's adventure into the violent world of shadowhunting (demon killing), the teenage protagonists' restless spirit and the fragile love story that weaves itself into the narrative. The recipe for the album is simple: take an indie rock/pop band's song, shake, stir into a hypnotic EDM track, add a serene ballad, repeat half a dozen times, cook on high and, voila, you've got a healthy, balanced mix of action and emotion." She concluded "a torrent of eerie, dynamic electronic sounds punctuated by siren calls to get lost in the music." Writing for Renowned for Sound, Dannielle Elms stated "The Mortal Instruments: City of Bones is accompanied by a rocking soundtrack. When you listen to it, you follow a path through intensely dark love songs and some pounding beats. It's an ass-kicking soundtrack, which if you haven't seen the movie, makes you run straight to the cinema." He called the soundtrack as "evocative of the dark events of the film". About the film's soundtrack, Cosmopolitan wrote "a slightly quiet film asides from the fist-pumping rave music during the fight scenes. Demi Lovato's lovely voice pipes up at The Big Kiss Scene, plus there's a lot of classical music love going on."

James Southall of Movie Wave wrote "what does differentiate this score are actually the quieter, more tender moments, where it becomes clear that Örvarsson isn't just another robot on the production line – there's actual emotional depth to things like "Pretty Far From Brooklyn", or the quieter choral moments, even the ethereal quality of the electric cello heard in a few cues. Having said that – it would be entirely curmudgeonly to suggest that the barnstorming action music isn't without its enjoyment – "The Angel Rune" in particular is great fun. It's a decent album, the best from this composer, and suggests there's some real talent there." Jonathan Broxton wrote "The Mortal Instruments: City of Bones is one of the most unexpectedly pleasant surprises in film music in 2013, a year which has, for the most part, failed to deliver many outstanding scores during its first eight months. Considering how quick his turnaround was from when he was hired, Atli Örvarsson's work here is astonishingly accomplished, emotional and exciting, with plenty of enjoyment to be gleaned from its three main elements: orchestra, chorus and synths. He continues to be a chameleon whose scores are impossible to predict beforehand, and this a good thing." Writing for Variety, Justin Chang stated "Atli Orvarsson's unmemorable score is supplemented with snippets of Bach's Goldberg Variations, which tie into one of the script's better gags".

James Christopher Monger of AllMusic reviewed both the film score and soundtrack. For the former, he stated "an evocative original score that blends orchestral, choral, and icy electronic cues with high-energy, percussion-heavy moments of pure adrenaline." For the soundtrack, he called "a 11-track collection of angst-fueled teen-pop, blistering post-hardcore, quirky indie pop, and R&B-infused electro-pop, all of which do their best to invoke the sights and sounds of the film adaptation of New York Times best-selling author Cassandra Clare's popular young adult, urban fantasy series."

== Oscar shortlist ==
The original score for City of Bones was shortlisted as one among the potential contenders by the Academy of Motion Picture Arts and Sciences for the Best Original Score category in the 86th Academy Awards, alongside Örvarsson's score for Hansel & Gretel: Witch Hunters (2013). However, both scores were not nominated. "When the Darkness Comes" by Colbie Caillat, was also featured in the longlist of 75 contenders, for Best Original Song in the same ceremony, but also being not nominated.

== Chart performance ==
Chart (2013)	Peak position
UK Compilation Albums (OCC)	54
UK Digital Albums (OCC)	23
UK Soundtrack Albums (OCC)	8
US Billboard 200	32
US Top Soundtracks (Billboard)	3
