= Adil Khan (actor) =

Norwegian actor

Adil Khan عادل خان
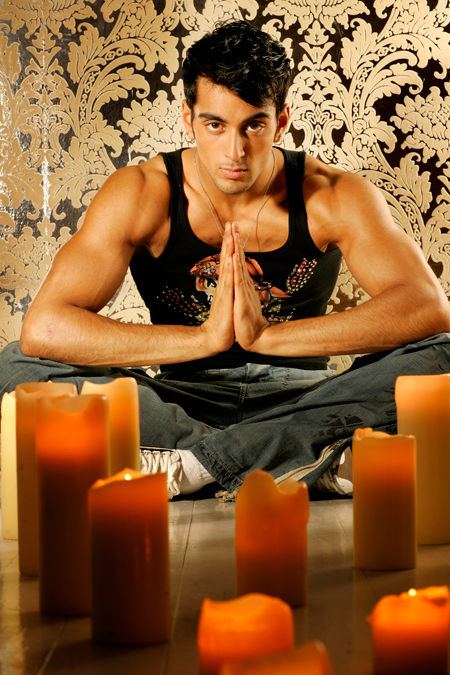
- A photo shoot with Morten Bendiksen (2006)
- Born: Adil Khan; 3 February 1983 (age 43); Oslo
- Occupation: Actor
- Years active: 2006–present
- Website: www.adil.no

Adil Khan (Urdu: عادل خان pronounced [ˈaːd̪ɪl xaːn]; born 3 February 1983 in Oslo, Norway) is a Norwegian dancer and actor. He won Dansefeber, hosted by TVNorge in 2006.

== Life ==
=== Early life ===
Adil Khan was born in Oslo, Norway. In his early childhood, he lived at Munkelia. Later, his family moved to Grønland and then to an area close to Ullevål Stadion. Khan's father is from the Punjab province of Pakistan, and his mother is a Pashtun who has her roots in Afghanistan. Khan is the younger brother of film director and human rights activist Deeyah Khan.

=== Music and dance ===
In 1999, Khan, together with his friends, founded the dance group Floor Knights. Khan has also lived in Copenhagen where he was a member of the breakdance group Natural Effects. He has won several dance competitions in Norway and abroad, such as B-boy Rumble 1999 (Norwegian championship), Scandinavian Battle of the Year 2001, and Time 2 Battle in Malmö (Scandinavian championship). His breakthrough came in 2006 when he won the Norwegian national dance competition Dansefeber in its inaugural season. After winning season 1 of Dansefeber, he left for Los Angeles where he joined Quest Crew (winners of the third season of America's Best Dance Crew).

In 2009, Khan was invited to sing Michael Jackson's "Man in the Mirror" for Auma Obama, the half-sister of President Barack Obama. The programme was arranged by NRK1 in connection with a fund-raising campaign for Africa.

=== Actor ===
After winning Dansefeber, Khan started receiving offers from national Norwegian theaters for acting jobs. His acting debut came in 2006 at Oslo Nye Teater as Bernardo in West Side Story. He returned to Norway in 2007. The first play, after his arrival was The Nutcracker which followed by several other productions. Khan received critical acclaim for his performance in The Jungle Book as Mowgli, which got him the nomination for Hedda Award in the best male role category. Khan is the youngest actor in Norway to ever be nominated for the award.

=== Miscellaneous ===
- Khan was a presenter for entertainment program named Adils hemmelige dansere( Adil's secret dancers). This was a two series program presented at NRK1 in 2013 and 2014. Adils hemmelige dansere was a Norwegian version of Ashley Banjo's Secret Street Crew. Both series were nominated for Gullruten award as a best reality program.
- Khan served as a judge on Norske Talenter (series 4) during 2011 and (Series 5) 2012. Norske Talenter (Norwegian Talents) is a Norwegian version of Got Talent series. It is a talent show that features singers, dancers, magicians, comedians and other performers of all ages competing for the specified prize. The programme is being presented by TV 2 since 2008.

== Acting career ==
=== Film/TV ===
Year	Title	Role	Notes	Director
2014	Adils hemmelige dansere (Season Two)	Adil	Norwegian Version of Ashley Banjo's Secret Street Crew	
2013	Adils hemmelige dansere (Season One)	Adil	Norwegian Version of Ashley Banjo's Secret Street Crew	
2012	Johan Falk	Pramit		Charlotte Brändström
2011	Taxi	Javar	Nomination for Norwegian TV Award Gullruten as the Best Male Actor	Ulrik Imtiaz Rolfsen
2010	Heart to Heart	Adil		Marit Åslein

=== Theatre ===
Theatre
Year	Title	Role	Notes	Director
2010	Spring Awakening	Moritz		Kjersti Horn
2010	The magic city (Nor:Trollbyen)	Hans		Catrine Telle
2009	The Jungle Book	Mowgli	Nomination for Hedda Award as the Best Male Actor	Erik Ulfsby
2008	@lice	Amo	Filmed and telecasted in 2009 by NRK2	Kjersti Alveberg
2007	The Nutcracker	The Nutcracker		Steen Koerner
2006	West Side Story	Bernardo		Svein Sturla Hungnes

== Honors and awards ==
- In 2010, he was assigned as goodwill ambassador for UNICEF Norway.
- In 2008, Adil received Oslo City art award at Oslo City Hall by Oslo Municipality for his contributions in Oslo's artistic life.
- In 2006-2007, Adil Khan became the first goodwill ambassador for FRI (an anti smoking and anti drugs campaign initiated by Norwegian Directorate for Health and Social Affairs).
- On 31 May 2006, Adil was awarded by Norwegian Cancer Society for his work among the youth.
