= Dansefeber =

Norwegian TV show

- Presented by: Kjetil Tefke; Henriette Lien
- Judges: Merete Lingjærde; Jan Ivar Lund; Vibeke Sørlie; Lars Undli; Geir Bie
- Country of origin: Norway
- No. of seasons: 2

Original release
- Network: TVNorge
- Release: 2006 – 2007

Dansefeber is the Norwegian iteration of the dance competition show So You Think You Can Dance. It was broadcast on TVNorge (Norway) and hosted by Kjetil Tefke in its first season (2006) and Henriette Lien in the second (2006-2007). The winners for seasons 1 and 2 were Adil Khan and Hanna Mjåvatn, respectively.

== Show format ==
Like its American predecessor and other shows within the So You Think You Can Dance franchise, prospective competitors are first assessed at open auditions. Dansefeber held several of these auditions in major cities across Norway in its search for its initial talent pool, with dancers from a wide variety of backgrounds encouraged to audition. The auditions succeeded in drawing in dancers from styles as varied as ballroom, hip-hop, streetdance, contemporary, jazz, and ballet, amongst others. Dancers who qualified to move beyond this point in the competition earned a ticket to "Feberdagene" ("The Fever Days"), Dansefeber's version of the "Boot Camp" portion of the season. From the dancers sent on to this phase, twenty dancers (ten male and ten female) were chosen per season to advance to the main portion of the competition.

In the first season, dancers switched partners every week of the competition from the first week of live performance shows. However, starting in the second season, couples stayed together (unless broken up by an elimination) until the show reached twelve finalists, in a format more consistent with other So You Think You Can Dance shows. Between the top twenty and the top twelve, viewers voted based on the couple, rather than the individual. Once the show reached its top twelve dancers, the dancers randomly pick their partner's name from a hat as well as their style(s) of dance.

== Seasons ==
=== Finalists ===
Season	Year	Winner	Runner-up	3rd	4th	Host(s)	Judges
1	2006	Adil Khan (breakdance)	Maria Nygård (contemporary)	Christopher Petersen (contemporary)	Tine Aspaas (jazz/contemporary)	Henriette Lien; Kjetil Tefke	Merete Lingjærde; Jan Ivar Lund; Vibeke Sørlie; Lars Undli
2	2007	Hanna Mjåvatn (contemporary)	Eric Nærbø (hip-hop)	Michelle Purvis (jazz/contemporary)	Bjørn Holthe (Latin ballroom)	Henriette Lien	Merete Lingjærde; Geir Bie; Vibeke Sørlie

=== Season 1 ===
The first season was hosted by Henriette Lien and Kjetil Tefke. Judges were ballroom/jazz choreographer Jan Ivar Lund, contemporary choreographer Merete Lingjærde, breakdancer Lars Undli and hip-hop choreographer Vibeke Sørlie. This first season featured 16 picked from the open audition/Fever Days participants to be perform as finalists in live show. The winner of Season 1 was breakdancer Adil Khan, with Maria Nygård as the first runner-up.

=== Season 2 ===
The second season was hosted by Henriette Lien alone and judges Merete Lingjærde and Vibeke Sørlie returned, with new judge, the TV-producer Geir Bie. Auditions were held in Oslo, Bergen and Trondheim. This season, the number of finalists was increased to a Top 20 for the live shows. The winner of season 2 was contemporary dancer Hanna Mjåvatn, with Eric Nærbø named as the runner-up.

At the top 12 week performance, hip-hop dancer Mona-Jeanette Berntsen, was injured in a hip-hop routine with Ole Petter Knarvik, and was unable to compete further in the competition. As a result, the judges ruled that she could come back the following season and try out again. The show was not renewed for a third season, however, but rather replaced by multi-national competition So You Think You Can Dance Scandinavia, which included contestants from Norway, Sweden, and Denmark. Berntsen was allowed entry to this new competition and was ultimately its first (and only) winner.

== See also ==
- Dance on television

=== Similar shows ===
- The Ultimate Dance Battle
- Live to Dance/Got to Dance
- America's Best Dance Crew
- Superstars of Dance
- Dance India Dance
- Se Ela Dança, Eu Danço
