= H2H =

H2H may refer to:

- Hand-to-hand combat, physical confrontation between two or more persons at short range
- Head to Head, a list of topics
- Heart to Heart, a list of topics
- Hearts2Hearts, South Korean girl group
- Human-to-human transmission, spread of an infection from one person to another
