= So You Think You Can Dance Scandinavia =

- Presented by: Henriette Lien; Kicki Berg; Vicki Jo
- Starring: Merete Lingjærde; Benke Rydman; Niclas Bendixen
- Country of origin: Norway; Sweden; Denmark
- No. of seasons: 1
- No. of episodes: Sweden 22; Norway 20; Denmark 20

Production
- Executive producers: Jarle Nakken; Astrid Lundeberg; Carina Carlsson; Maria Thastum
- Running time: Varies

Original release
- Network: Kanal 5
- Release: 28 February – 29 May 2008
- Network: TVNorge
- Release: 13 March – 29 May 2008
- Network: Kanal 5 (Denmark)
- Release: 13 March – 29 May 2008

So You Think You Can Dance Scandinavia was an entry in the international So You Think You Can Dance franchise of dance competition television shows which represented Denmark, Norway, and Sweden.

Prior to the launch of the show, Denmark and Norway each had their own individual So You Think You Can Dance shows (Kan Du Danse? and Dansefeber, respectively) which aired on channels Kanal 5 of Denmark and TVNorge of Norway. Both networks belonged to media conglomerate ProSiebenSat.1 Media and, following a run of two seasons for both shows, a decision was made to combine them into one series that would be broadcast in (and allow contestants from) both countries as well as Sweden. Swedish station Kanal 5 (also owned by ProSiebenSat.1) took on the bulk of the production for the new show and aired it in Sweden with TVNorge and Kanal 5 (of Denmark) continuing as the broadcasters in their regions. This combined series was discontinued after one season, ending the run of So You Think You Can Dance in Scandinavia.

The first and only winner of So You Think You Can Dance Scandinavia was Mona Berntsen. She was a dancer who had fared well in Dansefeber in 2007, progressing to that show's top 12 before an injury forced her to withdraw. Berntsen was told that she could audition for next season of Dansefeber, and when that show was combined to make So You Think You Can Dance Scandinavia, she was extended an invitation to participate. As the winner of the new series, she won 500.000 NOK and the title "Scandinavia's Favourite Dancer". First runner-up was Martin Gæbe, 3rd place-finalist was Daniel Koivunen, and Mynte Lagoni took 4th place.

== Hosts ==
- Henriette Lien (Norway)
- Vicki Jo (Denmark)
- Kicki Berg (Sweden)

== Judges ==
- Merete Lingjærde (Norway)
- Niclas Bendixen (Denmark)
- Fredrik "Benke" Rydman (Sweden)
- Mary Murphy (guest judge, US)

== Auditions ==
The minimum age for audition was 16 years, and those who got through would advance to the show's main headquarters in Oslo. Contestants must use music from the industry's Big Four labels – Universal Music Group, EMI, Warner Music Group or Sony BMG. The auditions were held in Oslo (Norway), Copenhagen (Denmark) and Stockholm (Sweden).

=== Workshop ===
After the auditions in Norway, Denmark and Sweden the show had a big workshop in Oslo.

There they found 8 dancers from each country. 4 males and 4 females each. The workshop included (with eliminations after each performance):

| Challenge | Music | Choreographer(s) |
|---|---|---|
| Hip-Hop | "Say Goodbye to Love"—Kenna feat. Lupe Fiasco | Filmon Michael |
| Samba | "Sway"—The Pussycat Dolls | Bjørn Holthe (Dansefeber season 2); Anette Stokke (Dansefeber season 2) |
| Contemporary Jazz | "Sorry"—Madonna | Knut Arild Flatner; Karl-Erik Nedregaard |

== Finals ==
=== Format ===
The finals began with 24 contestants, 4 males and 4 females from each country. After partners are assigned, couples pick a dance style out of a hat, have a rehearsal with a choreographer, and perform their routine. Following the airing performances, home viewers vote for their favorite couple. The bottom three couples (six dancers overall) are then liable for elimination by the judges on the result shows an hour later. All six dancers perform a solo, after which the judges eliminate one male and one female contestant (the first two shows they eliminate four dancers). If the eliminated dancers are not from the same couple, their respective partners form a new pair for the following week's performances. Once the field of dancers is narrowed down to the top 12, permanent partnerships dissolve and contestants draw their new partners and two dance styles from a hat each week. The judges no longer have any say in the elimination process; viewers call in to vote for their favorite individual dancer, and the male and the female with the lowest votes are eliminated each week.

=== Top 24 finalists ===
==== Male contestants ====
| Finalist | Age | Home Country | Dance Style | Elimination date |
|---|---|---|---|---|
| Martin Gæbe | 18 | Denmark | Hip-Hop | Runner-Up |
| Daniel Kouvinen | 22 | Sweden | Contemporary / Jazz | 3rd Place |
| Sérgio Júnior | 18 | Sweden | Contemporary / Jazz | May 29, 2008 |
| Ronni Morgenstjerne | 21 | Denmark | Hip-Hop | May 22, 2008 |
| Robin Peters | 22 | Sweden | Contemporary / Jazz | May 15, 2008 |
| Egor Filipenko | 20 | Norway | Latin Ballroom | May 8, 2008 |
| Marvin Spahi | 22 | Denmark | Hip-Hop | May 1, 2008 |
| Daniel Sarr | 16 | Norway | Hip-Hop | April 24, 2008 |
| Phillip Jenkins | 27 | Denmark | Contemporary / Jazz | April 17, 2008 |
| Geir Gundersen | 30 | Norway | Latin Ballroom | April 17, 2008 |
| Mario Amigo | 22 | Sweden | Hip-Hop | April 10, 2008 |
| Yngvar Halvorsen | 20 | Norway | Breakdance | April 10, 2008 |

==== Female contestants ====
| Finalist | Age | Home Country | Dance Style | Elimination date |
|---|---|---|---|---|
| Mona Berntsen | 18 | Norway | Hip-Hop | Winner |
| Mynte Lagoni | 19 | Denmark | Contemporary | 4th Place |
| Emma Hedlund | 24 | Sweden | Contemporary / Jazz | May 29, 2008 |
| Siv Gaustad | 33 | Norway | Contemporary / Jazz | May 22, 2008 |
| Trinh Nguyen | 22 | Norway | Contemporary | May 15, 2008 |
| Huyen Huynh | 26 | Norway | Hip-Hop | May 8, 2008 |
| Marie Sol Sandberg | 24 | Denmark | Contemporary / Jazz | May 1, 2008 |
| Sandra Vather | 27 | Sweden | Contemporary / Jazz | April 24, 2008 |
| Anete Jensen | 18 | Denmark | Hip-Hop | April 17, 2008 |
| Suzi Asovic | 22 | Sweden | Contemporary / Jazz | April 17, 2008 |
| Andrea Schirmer | 17 | Sweden | Latin Ballroom | April 10, 2008 |
| Stinna Shaktiva | 28 | Denmark | Contemporary / Jazz | April 10, 2008 |

==== Elimination chart ====
Contestants are in chronogical order of elimination.

| Female | Male | Did not perform | Bottom 3 couples | Bottom 6 contestants | Eliminated |

| | Week: | 4/10 | 4/17 | 4/24 | 5/1 | 5/8 | 5/15 | 5/22 | 5/29 |
| | Contestant | Result | | | | | | | |
| Winner | Mona Berntsen | DNP | | | Btm 3 | | | | Winner |
| Runner-up | Martin Gæbe | | DNP | | | | | Btm 6 | Runner-Up |
| Top 4 | Daniel Kouvinen | | DNP | | | | | | Elim |
| Top 4 | Mynte Lagoni | | DNP | | | | Btm 6 | Btm 6 | Elim |
| Top 6 | Sergio Junior | DNP | | | Btm 3 | | Btm 6 | Btm 6 | Elim |
| Top 6 | Emma Hedlund | | DNP | | | | | Btm 6 | Elim |
| Top 8 | Ronni Morgenstjerne | DNP | | Btm 3 | | Btm 6 | Btm 6 | Elim | |
| Top 8 | Siv Gaustad | DNP | | Btm 3 | | Btm 6 | Btm 6 | Elim | |
| Top 10 | Robin Peters | DNP | | | Btm 3 | Btm 6 | Elim | | |
| Top 10 | Trinh Nguyen | | DNP | | | Btm 6 | Elim | | |
| Top 12 | Egor Filipenko | | DNP | | | Elim | | | |
| Top 12 | Huyen Huynh | Btm 3 | DNP | Btm 3 | Btm 3 | Elim | | | |
| Top 14 | Marvin Spahi | Btm 3 | DNP | Btm 3 | Elim | | | | |
| Top 14 | Marie Sol Sandberg | DNP | | | Elim | | | | |
| Top 16 | Daniel Sarr | DNP | Btm 3 | Elim | | | | | |
| Top 16 | Sandra Vather | DNP | Btm 3 | Elim | | | | | |
| Top 24 | Phillip Jenkins | DNP | Elim | | | | | | |
| Top 24 | Geir Gundersen | DNP | Elim | | | | | | |
| Top 24 | Anete Jensen | DNP | Elim | | | | | | |
| Top 24 | Suzi Asovic | DNP | Elim | | | | | | |
| Top 24 | Mario Amigo | Elim | | | | | | | |
| Top 24 | Yngvar Halvorsen | Elim | | | | | | | |
| Top 24 | Andrea Schirmer | Elim | | | | | | | |
| Top 24 | Stinna Shaktiva | Elim | | | | | | | |

=== Performances ===
==== Week 1 (10 April 2008) ====
- Couple dances:

| Couple | Style | Music | Choreographer(s) | Result |
|---|---|---|---|---|
| Huyen Huynh; Mario Amigo | Hip-Hop | "Ching-A-Ling"—Missy Elliott | Thomas Bentsem | Amigo eliminated |
| Andrea Schirmer; Marvin Spahi | Salsa | "Everything I Can't Have"—Robin Thicke | Jazzy | Schirmer eliminated |
| Trinh Nguyen; Martin Gæbe | Lyrical Jazz | "Beautiful"—Me'Shell NdegéOcello | Sabina Dalfjäll | Safe |
| Stinna Shaktiva; Yngvar Halvorsen | Hip-Hop | "Señorita"—Justin Timberlake | Thomas Bentsem | Both eliminated |
| Mynte Lagoni; Daniel Koivunen | Contemporary Jazz | "Tea"—Øivind Andersen Sjøvoll | Tine Aspaas | Safe |
| Emma Hedlund; Egor Filipenko | Cha-Cha | "Get the Party Started"—Shirley Bassey | Bjørn Holthe | Safe |

- Group dance: Contestants next show (week 2): "Freakshow"—Britney Spears (Jazz; Choreographer: Tine Aspaas)
- Bottom 3's solos:

| Dancer | Style | Music | Result |
|---|---|---|---|
| Mario Amigo | Hip-Hop | "Rubber Bullet Kiss"—Motocross Madness | Eliminated |
| Huyen Huynh | Lyrical Hip-Hop | "What Love Is"—Mary J. Blige | Safe |
| Yngvar Halvorsen | Breakdance | "Right Here, Right Now"—Fatboy Slim | Eliminated |
| Stinna Shaktiva | Contemporary | "Footballer's Wife"—Amy MacDonald | Eliminated |
| Marvin Spahi | Hip-Hop | "We Gonna Win"—Miri Ben-Ari | Safe |
| Andrea Schirmer | Rumba | "Stickwitu"—The Pussycat Dolls | Eliminated |

- Eliminated:
  - Stinna Shaktiva
  - Andrea Schirmer
  - Yngvar Halvorsen
  - Mario Amigo
- New partners:
  - Huyen Huynh and Marvin Spahi

==== Week 2 (17 April 2008) ====
- Couple dances:

| Couple | Style | Music | Choreographer(s) | Results |
|---|---|---|---|---|
| Suzi Asovic; Geir Gundersen | Jive | "Hit Me Up"—Gia Farrell | Gunn Myhrengen | Both eliminated |
| Siv Gaustad; Ronni Morgenstjerne | Lyrical Jazz | "Dust in the Wind"—Sarah Brightman | Kristine Melby | Safe |
| Marie Sol Sandberg; Robin Peters | Salsa | "Nadie Como Ella"—Marc Anthony | Marina Prada | Safe |
| Sandra Vather; Phillip Jenkins | Contemporary Jazz | "Corners"—LAL | Kristine Melby | Jenkins eliminated |
| Anete Jensen; Daniel Sarr | Hip-Hop | "Lick Shots"—Missy Elliott | Gigi Torres | Jensen eliminated |
| Mona Berntsen; Sergio Junior | Afrocuban Rumba | "Echa Pa'Lante"—Thalía | Ibiroqai Regueria | Safe |

- Group dance: Contestants past show that got thru: "So Much Betta"—Janet Jackson feat. Daft Punk (Hip-Hop; Choreographer: Belinda Braza)
- Bottom 3's solos:

| Dancer | Style | Music | Result |
|---|---|---|---|
| Phillip Jenkins | Contemporary | "Personal Jesus"—Depeche Mode | Eliminated |
| Sandra Vather | Contemporary | "Isaac"—Madonna | Safe |
| Geir Gundersen | Samba | "On the Run"—Yello | Eliminated |
| Suzi Asovic | Jazz | "Rubber Bullet Kiss"—Motocross Madness | Eliminated |
| Daniel Sarr | Hip-Hop | "We Don't Need No Water (When I Need a Man)"—Tweet feat. Missy Elliott | Safe |
| Anete Jensen | Hip-Hop | "Get Ya Hands Up"—Fergie | Eliminated |

- Eliminated:
  - Suzi Asovic
  - Anete Jensen
  - Geir Gundersen
  - Phillip Jenkins
- New partners:
  - Sandra Vather and Daniel Sarr

==== Week 3 (24 April 2008) ====
- Couple dances:

| Couple | Style | Music | Choreographer(s) | Results |
|---|---|---|---|---|
| Emma Hedlund; Egor Filipenko | Quickstep | "Spider-Man theme song"—Michael Bublé | Bjørn Holthe | Safe |
| Sandra Vather; Daniel Sarr | Jazz | "Have You Met Miss Jones"—Robbie Williams | Roine Söderlundh | Both eliminated |
| Siv Gaustad; Ronni Morgenstjerne | House | "What Else Is There? (Trentemøller Remix)"—Röyksopp | Tine Salling | Bottom 3 |
| Marie Sol Sandberg; Robin Peters | Lyrical Jazz | "Weeds"—Jann Arden | Toni Ferraz | Safe |
| Mona Berntsen; Sergio Junior | Showdance | "Hit & Run Holiday"—My Life with the Thrill Kill Kult | Roine Söderlundh | Safe |
| Huyen Huynh; Marvin Spahi | Paso Doble | "España Cañi"—André Rieu | Bjørn Holthe | Bottom 3 |
| Trinh Nguyen; Martin Gæbe | Contemporary | "Swarms" | Sølvi Edvardsen | Safe |
| Mynte Lagoni; Daniel Koivunen | Locking | "Harder, Better, Faster, Stronger"—Daft Punk | Tine Salling | Safe |

- Group dance: Top 16: "Big Spender"—Shirley Bassey (Broadway; Choreographer: Roine Söderlundh)
- Bottom 3's solos:

| Dancer | Style | Music | Result |
|---|---|---|---|
| Daniel Sarr | Dancehall | "Breakout"—Sean Paul | Eliminated |
| Sandra Vather | Contemporary | "Non Me Lo So Spiegare"—Tiziano Ferro | Eliminated |
| Marvin Spahi | Funk | "Tears Dry On Their Own"—Amy Winehouse | Safe |
| Huyen Huynh | Jazz | "Scratch Bass"—Lamb | Safe |
| Ronni Morgenstjerne | Hip-Hop | "Diamonds From Sierra Leone (Instrumental)"—Kanye West | Safe |
| Siv Gaustad | Contemporary | "Overcome"—Tricky | Safe |

- Eliminated:
  - Sandra Vather
  - Daniel Sarr
- New partners:
  - None

==== Week 4 (1 May 2008) ====
- Couple dances:

| Couple | Style | Music | Choreographer(s) | Results |
|---|---|---|---|---|
| Mona Berntsen; Sergio Junior | Salsa | "Meñique Mañigua (Remix)"—DJ Duste | Jazzy | Bottom 3 |
| Huyen Huynh; Marvin Spahi | House | "It's Yours (Tiefschwarfz Remix)"—Dimitri From Paris | Sabina Dalfjäll | Spahi eliminated |
| Marie Sol Sandberg; Robin Peters | Waltz | "Dark Waltz"—Hayley Westenra | Bjørn Holthe | Sandberg eliminated |
| Trinh Nguyen; Martin Gæbe | New Style | "Marathon"—Kelis | Toniah Pedersen | Safe |
| Mynte Lagoni; Daniel Koivunen | Contemporary | "At the Heart of It All"—Nine Inch Nails | Masja Abrahamsen | Safe |
| Emma Hedlund; Egor Filipenko | Funk | "She Wants to Move"—N.E.R.D | Toniah Pedersen | Safe |
| Siv Gaustad; Ronni Morgenstjerne | Lyrical Jazz | "With Every Heartbeat"—Robyn feat. Kleerup | Sabina Dalfjäll | Safe |

- Group dance: Top 14: "Charlie Big Potato"—Skunk Anansie (Jazz; Choreographer: Kristine Melby)
- Bottom 3's solos:

| Dancer | Style | Music | Result |
|---|---|---|---|
| Marvin Spahi | Hip-Hop | "Just a Thought"—Gnarls Barkley | Eliminated |
| Huyen Huynh | Funk | "Poison"—Bel Biv DeVoe | Safe |
| Robin Peters | Jazz | "Spanish Joint"—D'Angelo | Safe |
| Marie Sol Sandberg | Contemporary | "It Tango"—Laurie Anderson | Eliminated |
| Sergio Junior | Contemporary | "This Year's Love"—David Gray | Safe |
| Mona Berntsen | Hip-Hop | "Fall Out"—Method Man | Safe |

- Eliminated:
  - Marie Sol Sandberg
  - Marvin Spahi
- New partners:
  - Every couple. Now that only the top 12 remain, new partners are randomly assigned each week.

==== Week 5 (8 May 2008) ====
- Couple dances:

| Couple | Style | Music | Choreographer(s) | Results |
|---|---|---|---|---|
| Mynte Lagoni; Robin Peters | Hip-Hop | "One and Only"—Timbaland feat. Fall Out Boy | Filmon Michael | Peters in Bottom 6 |
| Mynte Lagoni; Robin Peters | Jive | "Shake a Tail Feather"—The Blues Brothers | Steen Lund | Peters in Bottom 6 |
| Siv Gaustad; Martin Gæbe | Disco | "D.A.N.C.E"—Justice | Tomas Glans | Gaustad in Bottom 6 |
| Siv Gaustad; Martin Gæbe | Hip-Hop | "The Time Is Now (Bambino Casino Mix)"—Moloko | Belinda Braza | Gaustad in Bottom 6 |
| Huyen Huynh; Egor Filipenko | Rumba | "Wonderful Tonight"—Michael Bublé | Steen Lund | Both eliminated |
| Huyen Huynh; Egor Filipenko | Hip-Hop | "Cocaine"—Robin Thicke | Belinda Braza | Both eliminated |
| Mona Berntsen; Ronni Morgenstjerne | Hip-Hop | "Run (I'm a Natural Disaster)"—Gnarls Barkley | Filmon Michael | Morgenstjerne in Bottom 6 |
| Mona Berntsen; Ronni Morgenstjerne | Afro | "Throb"—Janet Jackson | David Byer | Morgenstjerne in Bottom 6 |
| Emma Hedlund; Sergio Junior | Broadway | "Big Time"—Linda Eder | Toni Ferraz | Safe |
| Emma Hedlund; Sergio Junior | Lyrical Jazz | "Talk to Me"—Gudny Aspaas | Tine Aspaas | Safe |
| Trinh Nguyen; Daniel Koivunen | Contemporary Jazz | "Any Other World"—Mika | Knut Arild Flatner; Karl-Erik Nedregaard | Nguyen in Bottom 6 |
| Trinh Nguyen; Daniel Koivunen | Cha-Cha | "Pata Pata"—Miriam Makeba | Steen Lund | Nguyen in Bottom 6 |

- Bottom 6's solos:

| Dancer | Style | Music | Result |
|---|---|---|---|
| Huyen Huynh | Hip-Hop | "Clockwork"—Juelz Santana | Eliminated |
| Trinh Nguyen | Jazz | "Supermassive Black Hole"—Muse | Safe |
| Siv Gaustad | Contemporary | "Where Is Everybody?"—Nine Inch Nails | Safe |
| Robin Peters | Jazz | "American Woman"—Lenny Kravitz | Safe |
| Ronni Morgenstjerne | Lyrical Hip-Hop | "Lost Without U"—Robin Thicke | Safe |
| Egor Filipenko | Cha-Cha | "Summertime"—Billy Stewart | Eliminated |

- Eliminated:
  - Huyen Huynh
  - Egor Filipenko

==== Week 6 (15 May 2008) ====
- Couple dances:

| Couple | Style | Music | Choreographer(s) | Results |
|---|---|---|---|---|
| Siv Gaustad; Martin Gæbe | Contemporary | "Zynk"—Peter Svenzon | Charlotta Öfverholm | Gaustad in Bottom 6 |
| Siv Gaustad; Martin Gæbe | Dance Comedy | "Casa Loma Stomp"—Pasadena Roof Orchestra | Wayne McKnight | Gaustad in Bottom 6 |
| Trinh Nguyen; Sergio Junior | Hip-Hop | "I Am Music"—Common | Toniah Pedersen | Nguyen eliminated Junior in Bottom 6 |
| Trinh Nguyen; Sergio Junior | Cha-Cha | "When Doves Cry"—Prince | Jan Ivar Lund | Nguyen eliminated Junior in Bottom 6 |
| Emma Hedlund; Robin Peters | Jazz | "One Step Closer"—Linkin Park | Jennie Widegren | Peters eliminated |
| Emma Hedlund; Robin Peters | Hip-Hop | "Ain't No Sunshine"—Soul For Real | Toniah Pedersen | Peters eliminated |
| Mona Berntsen; Daniel Koivunen | Tango | "I've Seen That Face Before (Libertango)"—Grace Jones | Jan Ivar Lund | Safe |
| Mona Berntsen; Daniel Koivunen | Contemporary | "It's a Man's Man's Man's World"—James Brown | Charlotta Öfverholm | Safe |
| Mynte Lagoni; Ronni Morgenstjerne | Electric Boogie | "Around the World"—Daft Punk | Kathrine Bølstad | Bottom 6 |
| Mynte Lagoni; Ronni Morgenstjerne | Jazz | "Rehab"—Rihanna | Jennie Widegren | Bottom 6 |

- Bottom 6's solos:

| Dancer | Style | Music | Result |
|---|---|---|---|
| Trinh Nguyen | Contemporary | "Loving You Still"—Tamia | Eliminated |
| Mynte Lagoni | Jazz | "Can't Let Go"—Linda Király | Safe |
| Siv Gaustad | Contemporary | "Aeroplane"—Björk | Safe |
| Ronni Morgenstjerne | Broadway | "Can't Buy Me Love"—Michael Bublé | Safe |
| Sergio Junior | Contemporary | "All That I Am"—Rob Thomas | Safe |
| Robin Peters | Hip-Hop | "Flashing Lights"—Kanye West feat. Dwele | Eliminated |

- Eliminated:
  - Trinh Nguyen
  - Robin Peters

==== Week 7 (22 May 2008) ====
- Couple dances:

| Couple | Style | Music | Choreographer(s) | Results |
|---|---|---|---|---|
| Emma Hedlund; Ronnie Morgonstjerne | Contemporary Jazz | "You Could Be Happy"—Snow Patrol | Knut Arild Flatner; Karl-Erik Nedregaard | Hedlund in Bottom 6 Morgonstjerne eliminated |
| Emma Hedlund; Ronnie Morgonstjerne | Hip-Hop | "The Trips"—Karma 9 | Ambra Succi | Hedlund in Bottom 6 Morgonstjerne eliminated |
| Mynte Lagoni; Martin Gæbe | Hip-Hop | "Sakura Planet"—A-Bee | Ambra Succi | Bottom 6 |
| Mynte Lagoni; Martin Gæbe | Quickstep | "Big and Bad"—Big Bad Voodoo Daddy | Malin Watson; David Watson | Bottom 6 |
| Mona Berntsen; Daniel Koivunen | Samba | "It Had Better Be Tonight"—Michael Bublé | Malin Watson; David Watson | Safe |
| Mona Berntsen; Daniel Koivunen | Lyrical Jazz | "It's Been Awhile"—Staind | René Winther | Safe |
| Siv Gaustad; Sergio Junior | Jazz | "Mercy"—Duffy | Toni Ferraz | Gaustad eliminated Junior in Bottom 6 |
| Siv Gaustad; Sergio Junior | Disco | "Jump (for My Love)"—Girls Aloud | Tomas Glans | Gaustad eliminated Junior in Bottom 6 |

- Bottom 6's solos:

| Dancer | Style | Music | Result |
|---|---|---|---|
| Mynte Lagoni | Contemporary | "Ghost Love Score"—Nightwish | Safe |
| Emma Hedlund | Contemporary | "Believe"—The Chemical Brothers | Safe |
| Siv Gaustad | Contemporary | "You Cause Me So Much Sorrow"—Sinéad O'Connor | Eliminated |
| Ronni Morgenstjerne | Funk | "Sweat (A La La La La Long)"—Inner Circle | Eliminated |
| Sergio Junior | Contemporary | "Glow"—Nelly Furtado | Safe |
| Martin Gæbe | Lyrical Hip-Hop | "Apologize"—Timbaland feat. OneRepublic | Safe |

- Eliminated:
  - Siv Gaustad
  - Ronni Morgenstjerne

==== Week 8 – Finale (29 May 2008) ====
Judges: Mary Murphy, Fredrik "Benke" Rydman, Merete Lingjærde and Niclas Bendixen

- Group dances:

| Dancers | Style | Music | Choreographer(s) |
|---|---|---|---|
| Top 24 (without top 6); Merete Lingjærde; Fredrik "Benke" Rydman; Niclas Bendixen | Broadway | "Comin' Home Baby"—Michael Bublé feat. Boyz II Men | Toni Ferraz |
| Top 6 | Contemporary Jazz | "Sorry (Paul Oakenfold Mix)"—Madonna | Knut Arild Flatner; Karl-Erik Nedregaard |
| Top 3 male dancers | Contemporary Jazz | "Starfuckers, Inc."—Nine Inch Nails | Tine Aspaas |
| Top 3 female dancers | Broadway | "These Boots Are Made For Walkin'"—Nancy Sinatra | Anja Gaardbo |

- Couple dances:

| Dancers | Style | Music | Choreographer(s) |
|---|---|---|---|
| Mynte Lagoni; Martin Gæbe | Hip-Hop | "Oh Timbaland"—Timbaland | David Dalmo |
| Mona Berntsen; Daniel Koivunen | Lindy Hop | "Swingin' the Blues"—Count Basie | David Dalmo |
| Emma Hedlund; Sergio Junior | Contemporary | "Beatrice"—Daniel Lanois | Anja Gaardbo |

- Winner of "best move"-competition on internet:
  - Mario Amigo (received 50.000 SEK)
- Top 6:
  - Sergio Junior
  - Emma Hedlund
- Top 4's solos:

| Dancer | Style | Music |
|---|---|---|
| Daniel Kouvinen | Street-Jazz | "Last Night"—P. Diddy feat. Keyshia Cole |
| Mynte Lagoni | Jazz | "Kiss"—Prince and The Revolution |
| Mona Berntsen | Dancehall | "Hmm Hmm"—Beenie Man |
| Martin Gæbe | Hip-Hop | "Stronger"—Kanye West |

- Top 4:
  - Mynte Lagoni (4th place)
  - Daniel Kouvinen (3rd place)
- Runner-up:
  - Martin Gæbe
- WINNER:
  - Mona Berntsen

== See also ==
- Dance on television
