= Your Forevers Don't Last Very Long (album) =

Studio album by Jean Shepard
- Released: September 1967
- Recorded: September 1965–April 1967
- Studio: Columbia (Nashville, Tennessee)
- Genre: Country
- Label: Capitol Records
- Producer: Marvin Hughes; Billy Graves

Jean Shepard chronology
Heart, We Did All That We Could (1967)	Your Forevers Don't Last Very Long (1967)	Heart to Heart (1968)

Singles from Your Forevers Don't Last Very Long
- 1. "Your Forevers (Don't Last Very Long)" Released: April 1967

Your Forevers Don't Last Very Long is a studio album by American country singer Jean Shepard. It was released in September 1967 by Capitol Records and consisted of 12 tracks. The album was both a collection of new recordings and cover tunes. Of the new recordings was the album's only single "Your Forevers (Don't Last Very Long)". The title track reached the top 20 on the US country chart in 1967. The album itself also reached the US country top 20 and received a positive review from Cash Box magazine.

== Background, recording and content ==
Jean Shepard originally rose to fame in the 1950s during country music's honky tonk period. She had a number one song with 1953's "A Dear John Letter", followed by the top ten recordings "A Satisfied Mind" and "Beautiful Lies". When country pop came into fashion, Shepard's commercial success declined. Ultimately, she returned with the comeback song in 1964 "Second Fiddle (To an Old Guitar)", which reignited her career and chart success. Your Forevers Don't Last Very Long was among the albums released during this period.

The album was compiled from sessions held between September 1965 and April 1967. It was recorded at the Columbia Studios in Nashville, Tennessee. It was produced by Marvin Hughes and Billy Graves. The album was a collection of 12 tracks. New recordings included the title track, "My Momma Didn't Raise No Fools" and "Happy Tracks". Other songs were cover tunes including "Born a Woman" and "There Goes My Everything".

== Release, critical reception, chart performance and singles ==
Your Forevers Don't Last Very Long was originally released in September 1967 on Capitol Records. It was the tenth studio album of Shepard's career. Capitol distributed the disc as a vinyl LP, with six songs on each side of the record. It was offered in both mono and stereo versions. The album was given a positive reception from Cash Box magazine who wrote, "Look out for Jean Shepard to grab a high chart spot with this powerful album." AllMusic rated the album four out of five possible stars. Your Forevers Don't Last Very Long peaked within the top 20 on the US Billboard Top Country Albums chart, rising to the number 19 position. It was her sixth consecutive album to make the country chart. The only single from the disc was the title track. Released in April 1967, it reached number 17 on the US country songs chart that year.

== Track listing ==
Side one
No.	Title	Writer(s)	Length
1.	"Your Forevers (Don't Last Very Long)"	Buchanan; Stone; Turner	2:37
2.	"Born a Woman"	Martha Sharp	2:03
3.	"I'm Living in Two Worlds"	Jan Crutchfield	3:07
4.	"Possession is Nine-Tenths of the Law"	Ronnie Robinson; Carol Babcock	2:30
5.	"My Mama Didn't Raise No Fools"	Bud Logan; Charles Snoddy	2:02
6.	"Happy Tracks"	Ray Pennington	2:27

Side two
No.	Title	Writer(s)	Length
1.	"Be Nice to Everybody"	Turner; Charlie Williams	2:01
2.	"There Goes My Everything"	Dallas Frazier	2:29
3.	"Walk Through This World with Me"	S. Seamans; K. Savage	2:24
4.	"I Can't Cry Him Away"	Neal Meritt	2:40
5.	"Life Turned Him That Way"	Harlan Howard	2:32
6.	"Coming or Going"	Shirley Wood	2:13

== Chart performance ==
Chart (1966)	Peak position
US Top Country Albums (Billboard)	19

== Release history ==
Region	Date	Format	Label	Ref.
North America	September 1967	Vinyl LP (Mono); Vinyl LP (Stereo)	Capitol Records	
Ireland; United Kingdom	September 1967	Vinyl LP (Stereo)	Capitol Records	
Taiwan	1968	Vinyl LP (Stereo Red)	CSJ	
