= Heart to Heart (Jean Shepard album) =

Studio album by Jean Shepard
- Released: February 1968
- Recorded: June–November 1967
- Studio: Columbia (Nashville, Tennessee)
- Genre: Country
- Label: Capitol
- Producer: Billy Graves

Jean Shepard chronology
Your Forevers Don't Last Very Long (1967)	Heart to Heart (1968)	A Real Good Woman (1968)

Singles from Heart to Heart
- 1. "I Don't See How I Can Make It" Released: August 1967

Heart to Heart is a studio album by American country singer Jean Shepard. It was released by Capitol Records in February 1968 and contained 12 tracks. The album's material mixed ballads with uptempo material. Many of the album's songs were cover tunes. Its lead single was "I Don't See How I Can Make It", a top 40 entry on the US country chart. The album received positive reviews from publications following its release. It was the eleventh studio album in Shepard's career.

== Background, recording and content ==
Jean Shepard had first rose to success in the 1950s honky tonk period of country music. She topped the charts with Ferlin Husky with "A Dear John Letter" (1953) and then had solo top ten hits like "Beautiful Lies". With country pop's growing popularity, her chart success waned until scoring a comeback in 1964 with "Second Fiddle (To an Old Guitar)". She had further chart records during the 1960s including several top ten songs and albums. One of Shepard's studio albums of this period was Heart to Heart. Produced by Billy Graves, it was recorded at the Columbia Studios in sessions held between June and November 1967. The album consisted of 12 tracks. The album was a mixture of ballads and uptempo material. Several cover tunes were included such as "Evil on Your Mind", "Release Me" and "Paper Mansions".

== Release, critical reception, chart performance and singles ==
Heart to Heart was released by Capitol Records in February 1968. It was distributed as a vinyl LP with six songs on each side of the record. It was offered in both mono and stereo formats. It was the eleventh studio album of Shepard's career. It was given positive critical reception. Cash Box wrote, "Warm vocals set to a traditional country theme highlight Jean Shepard’s performance on her latest Capitol album." Billboard highlighted individual performances, calling "Break My Mind" "a vocal package of dynamite" and described the lead single as a "superlative performance". It also received three out of five stars from AllMusic. Heart to Heart placed inside the US Billboard Top Country Albums chart, peaking at number 43 in 1968. It was Shepard's lowest-charting album on Billboard's survey up to that point and first to peak outside the top 40. The album's only single was "I Don't See How I Can Make It". Released in August 1967, it reached number 40 on the US Billboard country chart.

== Track listing ==
Side one
No.	Title	Writer(s)	Length
1.	"I Don't See How I Can Make It"	George Richey	2:25
2.	"What Locks the Door"	Vic McAlpin	2:15
3.	"Hangin' On"	Buddy Mize; Ira Allen	2:31
4.	"Evil on Your Mind"	Harlan Howard	2:12
5.	"Enough Heart to Hurt"	Ernest Reed; Jade Mangino	2:27
6.	"Roll Muddy River"	Betty Sue Perry	2:34

Side two
No.	Title	Writer(s)	Length
1.	"Paper Mansions"	Ted Harris	2:46
2.	"Before I'm Over You"	Perry	2:23
3.	"I Washed My Face in the Morning Dew"	Tom T. Hall	2:43
4.	"Break My Mind"	John D. Loudermilk	2:10
5.	"Release Me"	Eddie Miller; W.S. Stevenson	2:49
6.	"True Love's a Blessing"	Carol Smith; Sonny James	1:44

== Chart performance ==
Chart (1968)	Peak position
US Top Country Albums (Billboard)	43

== Release history ==
Region	Date	Format	Label	Ref.
North America	February 1968	Vinyl LP (Mono); Vinyl LP (Stereo)	Capitol Records	
Australia	February 1968	Vinyl LP (Stereo)	Music for Pleasure	
