= Mona Berntsen =

Norwegian-Moroccan dancer

- Born: Mona-Jeanette Berntsen; January 16, 1990 (age 36); Jar, Bærum, Norway
- Occupation: Dancer
- Known for: Winner of So You Think You Can Dance Scandinavia, dancer for Justin Bieber and Madonna
- Website: monaberntsen.com

Mona-Jeanette Berntsen (born January 16, 1990) is a Norwegian-Moroccan dancer. She is known for winning So You Think You Can Dance Scandinavia, and for working with artists such as Justin Timberlake, Alicia Keys and Chris Brown. She performed on the Purpose World Tour with Justin Bieber.

== Life and career ==
Mona Berntsen was born and raised in Norway by a Moroccan mother and a father from Northern Norway. After having her dance career breakthrough as the winner of So You Think You Can Dance Scandinavia at the age of 18, Berntsen was signed by Bloc Agency and moved from Norway to Los Angeles. In the coming years Berntsen worked with some of the world's biggest artists, including Justin Timberlake and Alicia Keys, before traveling on two world tours with Chris Brown. Berntsen has since performed at some of the world's biggest stages and shows, including the Academy Awards, Grammy Awards, Billboard Awards and several MTV Award Shows. In 2015, Berntsen also performed for Nike during a clothing line launch.

Berntsen grew up as a member of street dance crew Cre-8, with fellow So You Think You Can Dance Scandinavia contestant Daniel Sarr and So You Think You Can Dance Norway contestant Alexandra Joner as some of the other members. With Maria Karlsen as lead choreographer, Cre-8 got to the semi-finals in Norway's Got Talent.

Berntsen will be the choreographer of Melodi Grand Prix 2024, taking the role from Mattias Carlsson.

== So You Think You Can Dance Norway ==
Week	Partner	Dance	Music	Result
1	Endre Jansen	Afro	"Wanna Be Startin' Somethin'"—Michael Jackson	Safe
2	Endre Jansen	Lyrical jazz	"Hangin' By a Thread"—Jann Arden	Safe
3	Endre Jansen	Locking	"Rock Steady"—Aretha Franklin	Bottom 3
3	Results show solo		"Ring the Alarm"—Beyoncé Knowles	Bottom 3
4	Endre Jansen	Jive	"Bye Bye"—David Cerra	Safe
5	Ole Petter Knarvik	Hip-hop	"Ice Box"—Omarion	Injured

== So You Think You Can Dance Scandinavia ==
Week	Partner	Dance	Music	Result
2	Sergio Junior	Afrocuban Rumba	"Echa pa'lante"—Thalía	Safe
3	Sergio Junior	Showdance	"Hit & Run Holiday"—My Life with the Thrill Kill Kult	Safe
4	Sergio Junior	Salsa	"Meñique-Mañigua (DJ Duste Remix)"—DJ Duste	Bottom 3
4	Results show solo		"Fall Out"—Method Man	Bottom 3
5	Ronni Morgenstjerne	Hip-hop	"Run (I'm a Natural Disaster)"—Gnarls Barkley	Safe
5	Ronni Morgenstjerne	Afro-pop	"Thorb"—Janet Jackson	Safe
6	Daniel Kouvinen	Tango	"I've Seen That Face Before (Libertango)"—Grace Jones	Safe
6	Daniel Kouvinen	Contemporary	"It's a Man's Man's Man's World"—James Brown	Safe
7	Daniel Kouvinen	Samba	"It Had Better Be Tonight"—Michael Bublé	Safe
7	Daniel Kouvinen	Lyrical jazz	"It's Been Awhile"—Staind	Safe
8	Daniel Kouvinen	Lindy hop	"Swingin' the Blues"—Count Basie	Winner
8	Mynte Lagoni; Emma Hedlund	Jazz	"These Boots Are Made For Walkin'"—Nancy Sinatra	Winner
8	Final solo		"Hmm Hmm"—Beenie Man	Winner
