= Belinda Braza =

Norwegian dancer and singer

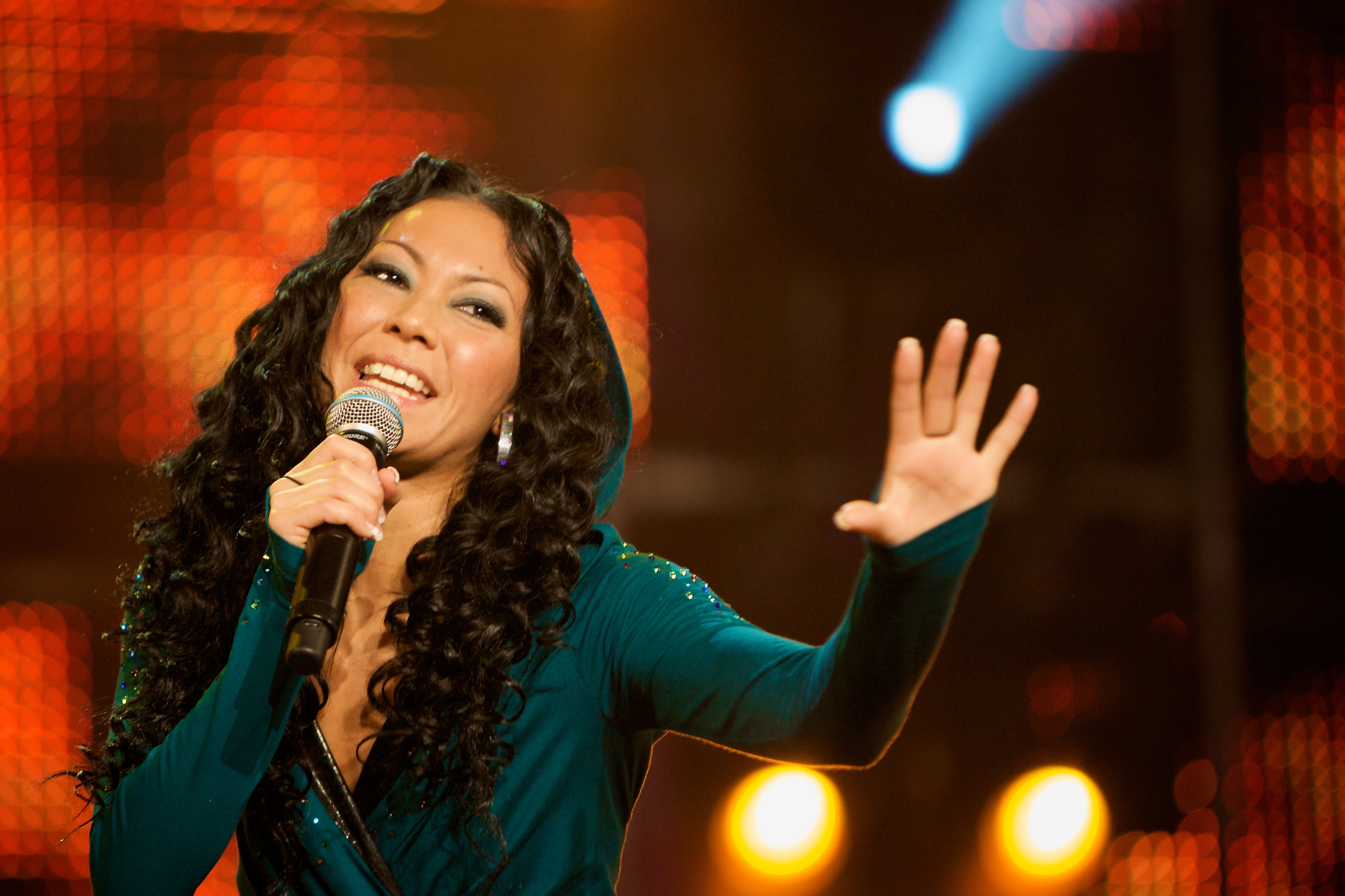
- Braza at Melodi Grand Prix in Skien, 2010
- Born: 30 November 1981; Bergen, Norway
- Occupations: Singer, dancer, actress
- Website: www.belindabraza.com

Belinda Braza (born 30 November 1981 in Bergen, Norway) is a Norwegian singer, choreographer, artist, actress, and the older sister of singer Myrna Braza.

== Career ==
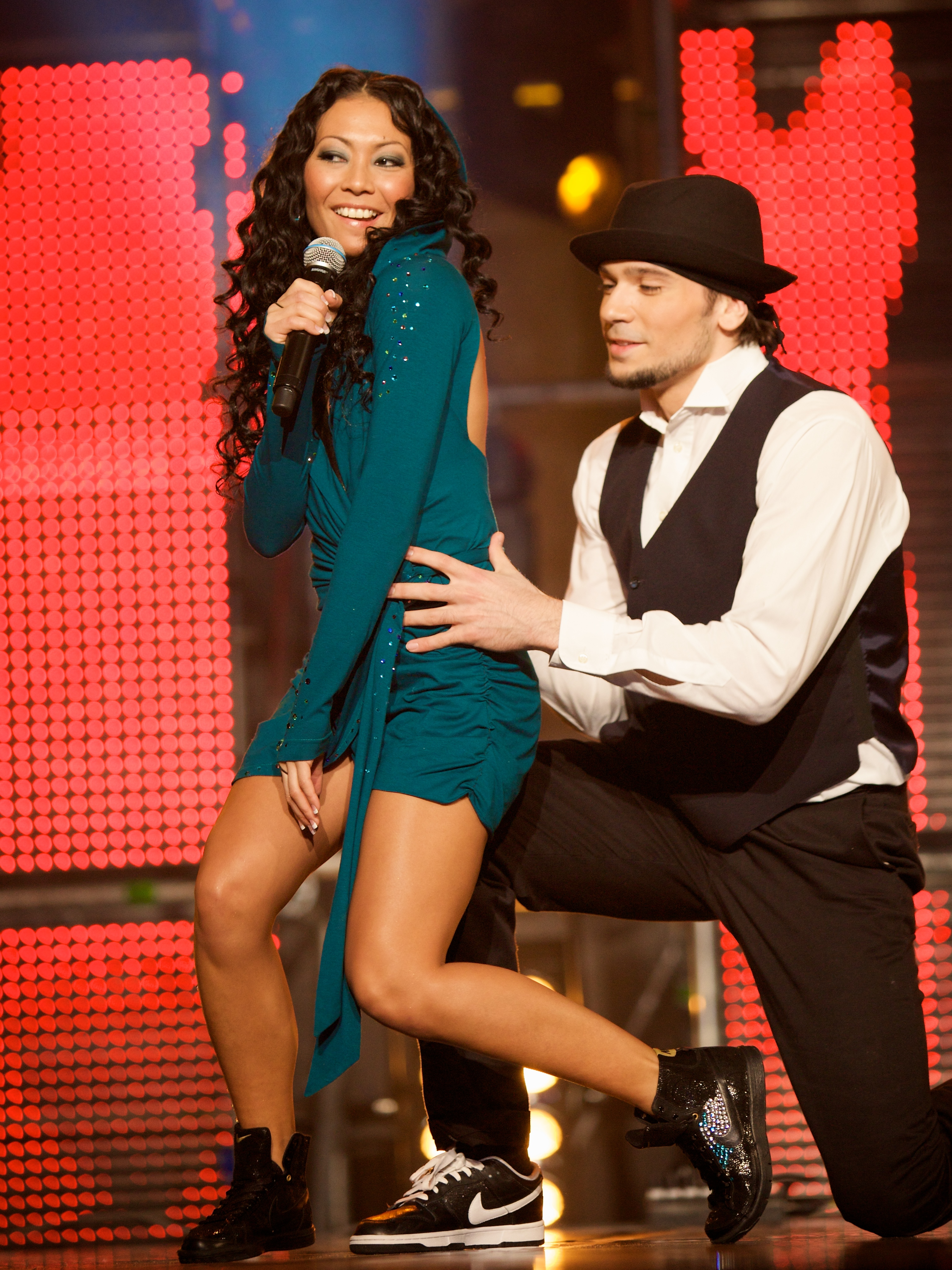
Melodi Grand Prix 2010

When still a student at Bergen Katedralskole in 1999, she sang and danced with the Norwegian Eurovision Song Contest participant Stig van Eijk on the song "Living My Life Without You", in Jerusalem. She is a professional dancer and teacher of hip hop and jazz dance at several dance schools in Oslo, like the Norwegian State Ballet College, Spinoff Dance Studio, Kristine Glennes Ballet School, Norwegian Ballet Institute and Torild Frostad's Dance Studio. Together with Jens Jeffry Trinidad she now offers workshops on hip hop dance all over Norway. They have a total of five hundred satisfied students every week and teaches moreover all levels and ages. Teamteach they call it. Braza is a graduate of the Bårdar Akademiet (2001–2003). She is also an aspiring choreographer and was one of hip hop choreographers who worked with Dansefeber at the Norwegian television TV Norge and on tour in collaboration with Riksteateret.

Braza has performed as a singer and actor in musicals and shows like Fame – The Musical (Chat Noir 2003), Det folk vil ha (Det Norske Teateret 2005), Fruen fra det indiske hav (Oslo Nye Teater 2006) to mention a few. She has choreographed for various artists like Samsaya, her younger sister Myrna Braza, Wisnu, Sichelle and Maria Haukaas Storeng. She also has choreography experience from show like on board the ship Color Fantasy, Melodi Grand Prix, KGB-kompaniet and TV-production Hundre år med egen stemme. Braza has performed as a dancer and singer in various TV shows like Gullfisken, Gullruten, Melodi Grand Prix and Eurovision Song Contest. She was also a program host for the program Ung at TV Hordaland. Her life motto should be "Be your dreams, fulfill yourself!". In 2010 she sang "Million Dollar Baby", one of the contesting tunes in the Norwegian Melodi Grand Prix.

== Discography ==
- 1999: Where I Belong (Mercury Records), with Stig van Eijk
- 2010: Melodi Grand Prix 2010 (Universal Music Group), with various artists on the tune "Million Dollar Baby»
