= Subjazz =

Norwegian choreographic duo

Subjazz is a Norwegian choreographic duo consisting of Karl-Erik Nedregaard and Knut Arild Flatner that made a new dance style called Samtidsjazz, but the style was changed into contemporary in the So You Think You Can Dance - Scandinavia article.
