= Your Forevers (Don't Last Very Long) =

Single by Jean Shepard

from the album Your Forevers Don't Last Very Long
- B-side: "Coming or Going"
- Released: April 1967
- Recorded: September 1965
- Studio: Columbia (Nashville, Tennessee)
- Genre: Country
- Length: 2:34
- Label: Capitol
- Songwriters: Buchanan; Stone; Turner
- Producer: Kelso Herston

Jean Shepard singles chronology
"Heart, We Did All That We Could" (1967)	"Your Forevers (Don't Last Very Long)" (1967)	"I Don't See How I Can Make It" (1967)

"Your Forevers (Don't Last Very Long)" is a song originally recorded by American country singer Jean Shepard. It was written by Wes Buchanan, Cliffie Stone and Scott Turner. Released as a single by Capitol Records in 1967, it reached the top 20 of the US country songs chart. It received a positive review from Cash Box magazine and appeared on a studio album of Shepard's with a Your Forevers Don't Last Very Long.

== Background and recording ==
Jean Shepard had more than 20 years of commercial success in the country field. This began in the 1950s honky tonk era with songs like the number one hit "A Dear John Letter" and the top ten hit "A Satisfied Mind". With the popularity of country pop, Shepard's success declined by the early 1960s. Then in 1964, she scored a comeback with the top ten single "Second Fiddle (To an Old Guitar)". This started a series of top 40 singles through the remaining decade. One of her chart records was "Your Forevers (Don't Last Very Long)". It was composed by Wes Buchanan, Cliffie Stone and Scott Turner. Produced by Kelso Herston, the track was recorded in September 1965 at the Columbia Studios in Nashville, Tennessee in September 1965.

== Release, critical reception and chart performance ==
"Your Forevers (Don't Last Very Long)" was released by Capitol Records as a single in April 1967. It was distributed as a seven-inch vinyl single. On its B-side was the song "Coming or Going". It was given a positive review from Cash Box who fond it to receive "a pretty treatment in Jeannie's [Jean's] hands". It was then released on the corresponding album of a similar title Your Forevers Don't Last Very Long. The single reached the top 20 of the US Billboard Hot Country Songs chart, peaking at the number 17 position in 1966. It became Shepard's thirteenth top 20 single on the Billboard country chart in her career.

== Track listings ==
7" vinyl single

- "Your Forevers (Don't Last Very Long)" – 2:34
- "Coming or Going" – 2:13

== Charts ==
Weekly chart performance for "Your Forevers (Don't Last Very Long)"
Chart (1967)	Peak position
US Hot Country Songs (Billboard)	17
