= Bjørnar Teigen =

Norwegian actor, theater director and playwright

- Born: Bjørnar Lisether Teigen; June 29, 1971 (age 54)
- Occupations: Actor; director; playwright
- Years active: 1996–present

Bjørnar Teigen (born 29 June 1971) is a Norwegian actor, theater director and playwright.

Teigen studied acting in the Oslo National Academy of the Arts and started working as an actor in Molde's Teatret Vårt after graduation in 1995.

He was awarded The Hedda Award for Debut of the Year for Det tredje tegnet (lit. The Third Sign), a theatre production he wrote and directed for Teatret Vårt in 2003. The following year he recurred as Lauritz in the sitcom Hos Martin.

In 2006, Teigen was nominated an Amanda Award for Best Actor for his work on the film Import-eksport.

== Filmography ==
Film
Year	Title	Role	Notes
2006	Import Export (Import-eksport)	Jan	

Television
Year	Title	Role	Notes
2004	Hos Martin	Lauritz	12 episodes

Stage
Year	Title	Role	Notes
1997	Fuenteovejuna	Rodrigo Téllez Girón	The Norwegian Theater
1999	Human Circle 3:1	Den unge	The Norwegian Theater
2000	Not About Nightingales	Kretsmeister	The Norwegian Theater
2003	Det tredje tegnet		Teatret Vårt (Writer, Director)
2008	Breaking the Waves	Terry	Oslo Nye Teater
2009	Edvard Munch - Alfa og Omega	Hans jæger / Various roles	Oslo Nye Theater
2013	Lilla		Teatret Vårt

== Plays ==
- Det tredje tegnet (2003)
- Blå himmel, grønn skog (2008)
- The Face on Mars

== Awards and nominations ==
Year	Work	Award	Category	Result
2003	Det tredje tegnet	The Hedda Awards 2003	Debut of the Year	Won
2006	Import Export (Import-eksport)	Amanda Awards	Best Actor	Nominated
