= Heart by Heart (Demi Lovato song) =

2013 song by Demi Lovato

Song by Demi Lovato

from the album The Mortal Instruments: City of Bones
- Released: August 20, 2013
- Genre: Rock
- Length: 3:43
- Label: Republic
- Songwriter: Diane Warren
- Producer: David Hodges

Official audio
- "Heart by Heart" on YouTube

"Heart by Heart" is a song recorded by American singer Demi Lovato for the soundtrack of the 2013 urban fantasy film The Mortal Instruments: City of Bones. Written by Diane Warren and produced by David Hodges, it was released on August 20, 2013. A rock ballad, "Heart by Heart" stars off slow and stripped down with Lovato's voice accompanied by a piano and builds to a crescendo.

== Background ==
Demi Lovato was announced as part of The Mortal Instruments: City of Bones soundtrack in July 2013. Lovato shared a preview of "Heart by Heart" online on July 3, and it was officially released in the following month as part of the film's soundtrack.

== Critical reception ==
The song received mostly positive reviews from critics upon its release. Hollywood Life correspondent Tierney McAfee labelled "Heart by Heart" the best love song of the summer "by far", citing the dynamic production and Demi's emotive vocals, which McAfee described as "pack[ing] a big emotional punch". The Huffington Post called the song "hauntingly beautiful" and praised the "powerful" piano-based instrumentation. Sam Lansky of Idolator lauded Lovato's "absolutely monster vocals" on the "soaring power ballad" and felt the song was anthemic, drawing comparisons to other Warren songs.

== Chart performance ==
Chart (2013)	Peak position
UK Singles (OCC)	115
US Pop Digital Songs (Billboard)	36
