= Henriette Lien =

Norwegian dancer and actress (born 1969)

Henriette Lien (born 20 December 1969) is a Norwegian dancer, musical actress, television and radio presenter.

She was born in Oslo. She made her dancing debut in London in 1989, later debuting in Norway in 1990. She starred in shows in musicals including Robin Hood, Cabaret, Guys and Dolls, A Chorus Line and Chicago.

Lien became known as an actor in the soap series Hotel Cæsar, commencing in 1998. She later joined the cast of sitcom Hos Martin' from 2004 to 2005. Lien continued as a presenter of the television shows Dansefeber, So You Think You Can Dance Scandinavia, Hit og dit, Grease and Fangene på fortet as well as the radio show Morgenklubben med Loven & Co.

After leaving the broadcast media, Lien became a full-time yoga instructor. She issued her first book Min yogareise ("My Yoga Journey").
