= Heart to Heart (Norwegian TV series) =

2007 fictional documentary, television series

Heart to Heart (Nor:Hjerte til hjerte) is a Norwegian fictional documentary presented by NRK1 in the winter of 2007. The series consist of eight episodes, with Linn Skåber in the lead role. Heart to Heart is based on an absurd, almost crazy humor. It is directed by Marit Åslein.

The series had its premiere on NRK1 25 January 2007. Even having the mixed reviews in the press, the series was named year's innovative series and received Gullruten award for 2007.

A new season of the series, containing 9 episodes has been shot in 2009. The first programme of the series is shown on 2 September 2010.
