= Poor Sweet Baby =

Single by Jean Shepard

from the album Poor Sweet Baby...And Ten More Bill Anderson Songs
- B-side: "I'm Not That Good at Goodbye"
- Released: September 1974
- Recorded: April 1974
- Studio: American Studios
- Genre: Country
- Length: 2:59
- Label: United Artists
- Songwriter: Bill Anderson
- Producer: Larry Butler

Jean Shepard singles chronology
"I'll Do Anything It Takes (To Stay with You)" (1974)	"Poor Sweet Baby" (1974)	"The Tip of My Fingers" (1975)

"Poor Sweet Baby" is a song written by American singer-songwriter Bill Anderson that was originally recorded by American country singer Jean Shepard. Released as a single by United Artists Records in 1974, it reached the top 20 of the US and Canadian country charts in early 1975. It would serve as the title track to Shepard's 1975 studio album Poor Sweet Baby...And Ten More Bill Anderson Songs.

== Background, recording and content ==
With more than 20 years of commercial success behind her, Jean Shepard moved to United Artists Records in the mid 1970s. Her first-label single was 1973's "Slippin' Away", which was written by Bill Anderson. The song was considered her comeback recording, rising into the top ten of the country charts. Anderson would then proceed to write Shepard's follow-up singles, including the top 20 singles "At the Time" and "Poor Sweet Baby". According to Anderson, he had not been focused on songwriting until Shepard found success with "Slippin' Away", which was one of the reasons behind him writing "Poor Sweet Baby" especially for her. The song's main character is a woman who becomes intimate with a married man and alludes to having intercourse with him. It was recorded at American Studios, located in Nashville, Tennessee in April 1974. The session for the song was produced by Larry Butler.

== Release, critical reception and chart performance ==
"Poor Sweet Baby" was released by United Artists Records as a single in September 1974. The label distributed it as a seven-inch vinyl single with a B-side titled "I'm Not That Good at Goodbye". Cashbox magazine praised both the single's ballad style along with Shepard's vocal delivery: "The tune is a ballad with Jean's superb vocal style comin' right on through. You can really feel that Jean's sincerity is heart felt on this fine tune." "Poor Sweet Baby" made the top 20 on the US Billboard Hot Country Songs chart. Entering the chart in late 1974, it rose to the number 14 position on the chart in early 1975. It was Shepard's third consecutive top 20 single on Billboard's country survey. It also became Shepard's second top 20 single on Canada's RPM Country Tracks chart, climbing to the number 17 position around the same time. "Poor Sweet Baby" inspired the title of Shepard's 1975 studio album of Bill Anderson songs called Poor Sweet Baby...And Ten More Bill Anderson Songs.

== Track listings ==
7" vinyl single

- "Poor Sweet Baby" – 2:59
- "I'm Not That Good at Goodbye" – 3:12

== Charts ==
Weekly chart performance for "Poor Sweet Baby"
Chart (1974–1975)	Peak position
Canada Country Tracks (RPM)	17
US Hot Country Songs (Billboard)	14
