= Poor Sweet Baby...And Ten More Bill Anderson Songs =

Studio album by Jean Shepard
- Released: March 1975
- Recorded: April–November 1974
- Studio: American Studios
- Genre: Country
- Label: United Artists
- Producer: Larry Butler

Jean Shepard chronology
| I'll Do Anything It Takes (1974) | Poor Sweet Baby...And Ten More Bill Anderson Songs (1975) | I'm a Believer (1975) |

Singles from Poor Sweet Baby...And Ten More Bill Anderson Songs
- 1. "Poor Sweet Baby" Released: September 1974; 2. "The Tip of My Fingers" Released: February 1975

Poor Sweet Baby...And Ten More Bill Anderson Songs is a studio album by American country singer Jean Shepard. It was released by United Artists Records in March 1975 and was her twenty-second studio album. The disc was a collection of songs that paid tribute to singer-songwriter Bill Anderson. It included some re-released Anderson-penned tracks that appeared on previous Jean Shepard albums, along with covers of songs Anderson had composed over the years. It received reviews from music publications following its release and made the US country albums chart.

== Background ==
Among country music's first successful female recording artists, Jean Shepard had a series of hits for more than 20 years. In 1973, Bill Anderson wrote what was considered her comeback recording called "Slippin' Away" and it rose into the country top ten. Knowing Shepard for many years, Anderson decided to write more songs for her after he decided to focus back on songwriting. He wrote her follow-up singles to "Slippin' Away": "At the Time" and "Poor Sweet Baby". Shepard wanted to pay tribute to Anderson for writing her material, prompting producer Larry Butler to approach United Artists with the idea of an making an album dedicated to him. The label then accepts Butler's request and Anderson received a phone call from the producer letting know this would occur.

== Recording and content ==
Poor Sweet Baby...And Ten More Bill Anderson Songs was produced by Larry Butler at American Studios, located in Nashville, Tennessee. Sessions for the album took place between April and November 1974. The album was a collection of 11 tracks. The disc re-released "Slippin' Away", "At the Time" and "Think I'll Go Somewhere and Cry Myself to Sleep". The latter tracks had already been issued on previous Jean Shepard albums. The liner notes of the disc were written by Anderson himself. In the notes, Anderson says of the tracks, "I won't try to describe the album because words can't describe music. Besides, I don't want to do anything to take away from the thrill you're going to have the first time you listen to this album."

== Release and critical reception ==
Poor Sweet Baby...And Ten More Bill Anderson Songs was released by United Artists Records in March 1975. It was distributed by the label as both a vinyl LP and a 8-track cartridge. The LP version featured five songs on side one and six songs on side two. The album was the twenty second of Shepard's career. It received reviews from music magazines following its release. Billboard named it among its "Top Album Picks" on March 1, 1975, praising Shepard's vocals: "The title says what's in the package, but it's Jeannie's interpretation of these great numbers that really makes it come off." On March 8, Cashbox magazine had similar findings, "Jean's vocals do much justice to Bill's writing. Her down to earthness shines through her tremendous talents," the publication wrote.

== Chart performance and singles ==
Poor Sweet Baby...And Ten More Bill Anderson Songs made the US Billboard Top Country Albums chart, rising to the number 42 position in 1975. It was Shepard's second-to-last album to make the chart in her career. A total of two singles were included on the disc. The earliest single was "Poor Sweet Baby", which was originally issued by United Artists in September 1974. It rose to the top 20 in both the United States and Canada, climbing to number 14 on the US Billboard Hot Country Songs chart and number 17 on the Canadian RPM Country Tracks chart. "The Tip of My Fingers" was the next single released and was first issued in February 1975. It also rose into the US Hot Country Songs top 20, peaking at number 16 in mid 1975. On the Canadian country chart, it made the top 30, peaking at number 25 during the same period.

== Track listing ==
All tracks composed by Bill Anderson, except where indicated.

Side one
| No. | Title | Writer(s) | Length |
|---|---|---|---|
| 1. | "Poor Sweet Baby" | | 3:02 |
| 2. | "I'm Alright" | | 2:45 |
| 3. | "When Two Worlds Collide" | B. Anderson; R. Miller | 2:27 |
| 4. | "At the Time" | | 2:30 |
| 5. | "The Tip of My Fingers" | | 2:55 |

Side two
| No. | Title | Writer(s) | Length |
|---|---|---|---|
| 1. | "Slippin' Away" | | 2:14 |
| 2. | "It's Enough to Make a Woman Lose Her Mind" | | 2:42 |
| 3. | "Bright Lights and Country Music" | B. Anderson; J. Gateley | 2:39 |
| 4. | "City Lights" | | 3:16 |
| 5. | "If You Can Live with It (I Can Live Without It)" | | 2:46 |
| 6. | "Think I'll Go Somewhere and Cry Myself to Sleep" | | 2:46 |

== Personnel ==
All credits are adapted from the liner notes of Poor Sweet Baby...And Ten More Bill Anderson Songs.

Musical personnel

- Tommy Allsup – Bass guitar
- Stu Bascore – Steel guitar
- Jimmy Capps – Rhythm guitar
- Jerry Carrigan – Drums
- Chuck Cochran – Piano
- Buddy Harman – Drums
- Jim Isbell – Drums
- The Jordanaires – Background vocals
- Red Lane – Rhythm guitar
- Kenny Malone – Drums
- Charlie McCoy – Harmonica
- Bob Moore – Bass
- George Richey – Piano
- Hargus "Pig" Robbins – Piano
- Bobby Thompson – Rhythm guitar
- Bill Sanford – Lead guitar
- Jean Shepard – Lead vocals
- Joe Zinkan – Bass

Technical personnel

- Bill Anderson – Liner notes
- Larry Butler – Producer
- Al Clayton – Photography
- Jonathan Heale – Typography
- Bill Justis – String arrangements
- RFS – Lacquer cut
- Lloyd Ziff – Art direction

== Chart performance ==
| Chart (1975) | Peak position |
|---|---|
| US Top Country Albums (Billboard) | 42 |

== Release history ==
| Region | Date | Format | Label | Ref. |
|---|---|---|---|---|
| North America | March 1975 | Vinyl LP (Stereo); 8-Track Cartridge | United Artists Records | |
| United Kingdom | March 1975 | Vinyl LP (Stereo) | United Artists Records | |
