= Just as Soon as I Get Over Loving You =

Studio album by Jean Shepard
- Released: September 1971
- Recorded: August 1970–June 1971
- Studio: Jack Clement Recording (Nashville, Tennessee)
- Genre: Country
- Label: Capitol
- Producer: Larry Butler

Jean Shepard chronology
Here & Now (1971)	Just as Soon as I Get Over Loving You (1971)	Just Like Walkin' in the Sunshine (1972)

Singles from Just as Soon as I Get Over Loving You
- 1. "With His Hand in Mine" Released: January 1971; 2. "Just as Soon as I Get Over Loving You" Released: July 1971

Just as Soon as I Get Over Loving You is a studio album by American country singer Jean Shepard. It was released by Capitol Records in September 1971 and was her eighteenth studio album. The project consisted of ten tracks featuring new material and cover tunes. Of its new recordings were two singles: the title track and "With His Hand in Mine". The latter was a top 25 US country single in 1971. The album was met with positive reviews from publications following its release.

== Background, recording and content ==
Jean Shepard was one of country music's first commercially successful solo female artists. She had top ten singles for 20 years between the 1950s and 1970s. For most of this time she remained with Capitol Records where she recorded a series of albums. One of her final albums issued with Capitol was Just as Soon as I Get Over Loving You. Sessions for the project were held at the Jack Clement Recording Studio in Nashville, Tennessee between August 1970 and June 1971. The project was produced by Larry Butler and contained a total of ten tracks. Among its tracks was a cover of Don Gibson's "Just One Time", which had recently been a commercial success for Connie Smith in 1971. Another was the Red Lane-composed song "The World Needs a Melody". Among its new material was the title track, "With His Hand in Mine" and "Look of Lovin' (In His Eyes)". The latter was described by Cash Box as being a song about being in middle-age.

== Release, critical reception and singles ==
Just as Soon as I Get Over Loving You was released by Capitol Records in September 1971. It was the eighteenth studio album of Shepard's career and with the Capitol label. It was distributed by Capitol as a vinyl LP, featuring five tracks on either side of the disc. The project received a positive response from Cash Box magazine, who wrote, "Every cut on this excellent LP is a programmer’s dream, but then again, so is Jean. Her style is so mellow and distinctive, just about everything she does just has to succeed." Alan Cackett of Country Music People magazine wrote that the project proved Shepard "was still a force to be reckoned with in country music." A total of two singles were included on Just as Soon as I Get Over Loving You. The first single released was "With His Hand in Mine", which Capitol first issued in January 1971. It reached number 24 on the US country songs chart. The title track was released as the second single in July 1971, which reached number 55 on the US country songs chart.

== Track listing ==
Side one
No.	Title	Writer(s)	Length
1.	"Just as Soon as I Get Over Loving You"	G. Richey; B. Peters	2:46
2.	"Just One Time"	Don Gibson	2:19
3.	"The Closest Thing to Perfect"	W. Woodward; J. Chesnut	2:27
4.	"Look of Lovin' (In His Eyes)"	L. Butler; J. Crutchfield	2:40
5.	"My Name Is Woman"	D. Hoffman; D. Kershenbaum	2:34

Side two
No.	Title	Writer(s)	Length
1.	"With His Hand in Mine"	L. Allen; L. Butler; R. Butler	2:47
2.	"The World Needs a Melody"	R. Lane; J. Slate; L. Henley	3:25
3.	"I'm Alone"	B. Rice; J. Foster	2:21
4.	"Just Plain Lonely"	B. Rice; J. Foster	2:22
5.	"Song of the Wind"	Bob Milsap	2:22

== Release history ==
Region	Date	Format	Label	Ref.
North America	September 1971	Vinyl LP (Stereo); Vinyl LP (Club Edition)	Capitol Records	
