= Another Neon Night =

Single by Jean Shepard

from the album I'm a Believer
- B-side: "(Hey Won't You Play) Another Somebody Done Somebody Wrong Song"
- Released: December 1975
- Recorded: July 1975
- Genre: Country
- Length: 3:03
- Label: United Artists
- Songwriter(s): Carolyn Sue Howard; Joanne Spain
- Producer(s): Larry Butler

Jean Shepard singles chronology
"I'm a Believer (In a Whole Lot of Lovin')" (1975)	"Another Neon Night" (1975)	"Mercy" (1976)

"Another Neon Night" is a song written by Carolyn Sue Howard and Joanne Spain that was originally recorded by American country singer Jean Shepard. It was released as the second single from her studio album I'm a Believer, reaching country chart positions in both the US and Canada. Describing a one-night-stand, the song has been described as being one of Shepard's best tracks and one of her favorite recordings as well.

== Background ==
Jean Shepard signed with United Artists Records in 1973 after many years on Capitol Records. Her first-label single, "Slippin' Away", returned her to the top ten of the country charts. At her new label and under new producer Larry Butler, she began experimenting with new song choices, including those that discussed sexuality. Among songs that discussed the latter theme was "Another Neon Night". Written by Carolyn Sue Howard and Joanne Spain, the song describes a one night stand and its main character is alluded to as possibly being a prostitute, according to Nashville Scene. Under Butler's production, "Another Neon Night" was recorded at the Jack Clement Studio (located in Nashville, Tennessee) in July 1975.

== Release and chart performance ==
"Another Neon Night" was released as a single by United Artists Records in December 1975. It was distributed as a seven-inch vinyl single, featuring a cover of "(Hey Won't You Play) Another Somebody Done Somebody Wrong Song" on the B-side. It reached the number 44 position on the US Billboard Hot Country Songs chart, becoming among her final charting US country singles. It also climbed into the top 40 on Canada's RPM Country Tracks chart, peaking at number 31. It would be Shepard's final-charting single in Canada. It was the second single spawned from Shepard's 1975 album I'm a Believer.

== Reception ==
Cashbox magazine described the song's main character as a "girl of the night" and further commented, "it has a strong lyric and music content and predicted strong chart action." In 2016, Nashville Scene magazine called the track "one of the most powerful recordings Shepard ever made". In an interview, Shepard named the song among one of her controversial recordings but said it had "such a haunting melody and it told a good story". In her autobiography, Shepard named "Another Neon Night" among her favorite songs that she recorded in her career. "'Another Neon Night', that's a well-written song; it's a song with a lot of truth in it. I love a song that's well-written and put together".

== Track listings ==
7" vinyl single

- "Another Neon Night" – 3:03
- "(Hey Won't You Play) Another Somebody Done Somebody Wrong Song" – 2:59

== Charts ==
Weekly chart performance for "Another Neon Night"
Chart (1975–1976)	Peak position
Canada Country Tracks (RPM)	31
US Hot Country Songs (Billboard)	44
