= I'm a Believer (album) =

Studio album by Jean Shepard
- Released: November 1975
- Studio: Jack Clement Recording (Nashville, Tennessee)
- Genre: Country
- Label: United Artists
- Producer: Larry Butler

Jean Shepard chronology
Poor Sweet Baby...And Ten More Bill Anderson Songs (1975)	I'm a Believer (1975)	Mercy, Ain't Love Good (1976)

Singles from I'm a Believer
- 1. "I'm a Believer (In a Whole Lot of Lovin')" Released: July 1975; 2. "Another Neon Night" Released: November 1975

I'm a Believer is a studio album by American country singer Jean Shepard. It was released by United Artists Records in November 1975 and was her twenty third studio recording. The album was a collection of ten tracks that mixed new songs with cover material. Among its new selections were two singles: the title track and "Another Neon Night". Both made the US country chart in 1975. The album was give positive reviews from music publications following its release.

== Background, recording and content ==
In 1973, Jean Shepard had a successful comeback in her forties after signing with United Artists Records. Her first-label single, "Slippin' Away", rose into the country top ten and she had several more charting singles which including 1975's "Another Neon Night". The latter would appear on her 1975 studio album I'm a Believer. The album was recorded at the Jack Clement Recording Studio located in Nashville, Tennessee and was produced by Larry Butler. The album was a collection of ten tracks. Included was a cover of the song "Blanket on the Ground" and new material such as the uptempo "He Loves Everything He Gets His Hands On". It also included "Another Neon Night" whose main character is involved in a one-night stand.

== Release and critical reception ==
I'm a Believer was released by United Artists Records in November 1975 and was Shepard's twenty third studio album. It was distributed as a vinyl LP, featuring five tracks on each side of the disc. It was later re-released by the Music for Pleasure label in the United Kingdom. I'm a Believer received positive reviews from music publications following its release. Billboard named it among its "Top Album Picks", praising Shepard's "throaty" singing and found that she "has never sounded better". They also called "Another Neon Night" "the best song she has ever recorded." Cashbox wrote, "I'm A Believer will make you a believer in the artistic singing ability of Jean Shepard."

== Singles ==
A total of two singles were included on I'm a Believer. Its title track was released as a single in July 1975 by United Artists Records. It reached the number 49 position on the US Billboard Hot Country Songs chart in mid 1975. It was Shepard's first single to peak outside the Billboard top 40 since 1972. It was followed by the release of "Another Neon Night" as a single in November 1975. It also peaked outside the US country songs top 40, rising to number 44 on the chart. It also made Canada's RPM Country Tracks chart, peaking at number 31 in 1975.

== Track listing ==
Side one
No.	Title	Writer(s)	Length
1.	"I'm a Believer (In a Whole Lot of Lovin')"	K. Jones	2:59
2.	"It Keeps Right on Hurtin'"	J. Tillotson	3:01
3.	"(Hey Won't You Play) Another Somebody Done Somebody Wrong Song"	L. Butler; C. Moman	2:59
4.	"I Think I'll Wait Till Tomorrow"	J. A. Spain; F. Winters	2:19
5.	"Good Nights Make Good Mornings"	N. Martin	2:59

Side two
No.	Title	Writer(s)	Length
1.	"Another Neon Night"	J. A. Spain; C. Howard	3:03
2.	"Blanket on the Ground"	Roger Bowling	3:34
3.	"He Loves Everything He Gets His Hands On"	G. Richey; R. Bowling; D. Wayne	2:46
4.	"We Had Some Good Times"	G. Martin	3:16
5.	"It Doesn't Hurt to Ask"	J. Foster; B. Rice	2:38

== Personnel ==
All credits are adapted from the liner notes of I'm a Believer.

Musical personnel

- Tommy Allsup – Bass guitar
- Jimmy Capps – Rhythm guitar
- Jerry Carrigan – Drums
- The Jordanaires – Backing vocals
- Kenny Malone – Drums
- Bob Moore – Bass
- Weldon Myrick – Steel guitar
- George Richey – Piano
- Pig Robbins – Piano
- Leon Rhodes – Rhythm guitar
- Billy Sanford – Lead guitar
- Jean Shepard – Lead vocals
- Henry Strzelecki – Bass

Technical personnel

- Larry Butler – Producer
- Billy Sherrill – Engineer

== Release history ==
Region	Date	Format	Label	Ref.
North America	November 1975	Vinyl LP (Stereo)	United Artists Records	
United Kingdom	November 1975	Vinyl LP (Stereo)	Music for Pleasure	
