= Got You on My Mind (disambiguation) =

Got You on My Mind is a 2004 jazz album by William Galison and Madeleine Peyroux.

Got You on My Mind may also refer to:

- Got You on My Mind (Jean Shepard album), 1961
- "Got You on My Mind" (song), a 1952 song written by Howard Biggs and Joe Thomas
