= Just Like Walkin' in the Sunshine =

Studio album by Jean Shepard
- Released: September 1972
- Recorded: June 1971–June 1972
- Genre: Country
- Label: Capitol
- Producer: Earl Ball; Larry Butler

Jean Shepard chronology
Just as Soon as I Get Over Loving You (1971)	Just Like Walkin' in the Sunshine (1972)	Slippin' Away (1973)

Singles from Just Like Walkin' in the Sunshine
- 1. "Safe in These Lovin' Arms of Mine" Released: November 1971; 2. "Virginia" Released: March 1972; 3. "Just Like Walkin' in the Sunshine" Released: July 1972

Just Like Walkin' in the Sunshine is a studio album by American country singer Jean Shepard. It was released in September 1972 by Capitol Records and was her nineteenth studio album. It would be Shepard's final Capitol album before moving to United Artists Records. Shepard was noticing a lack of attention towards her music from Capitol by this point and would even boycott recording sessions for the album until receiving more support from the company. Nonetheless, the album was completed and included three singles that peaked outside the US and Canadian country top 40 songs charts: "Safe in These Lovin' Arms of Mine", "Virginia" and the title track. It was given a positive review from Billboard following its release.

== Background, recording and content ==
Jean Shepard was among the country genre's first female solo artists to find commercial success. Her career launched in the 1950s on Capitol Records where she had top ten, top 20 and top 40 singles over the next two decades. By the early 1970s, Shepard's record sales had dropped and her commercial success waned. According to her autobiography, Shepard claimed that she was "getting lost in the shuffle" within the Capitol Records roster. In 1972, Shepard went on "strike" against Capitol, vowing not to record her next studio album until receiving "support" from the company.

Shepard then went into the studio to finish sessions her final sessions for Just Like Walkin' in the Sunshine in June 1972. It was produced by Earl Ball and Larry Butler. The album consisted of ten tracks. New material from Don Reid ("Virginia") and Jerry Chesnut ("Love Will Always Be There") was included in the track listing. Song story lines varied from discussing the joy's of love (such as the title track) and giving advice to a woman having an extramarital affair ("I've Loved Him Much Longer Than You").

== Release, critical reception and singles ==
Just Like Walkin' in the Sunshine was released by Capitol Records in September 1972. It was her nineteenth studio album in her career. The label distributed the disc as a vinyl LP, with five tracks on side of the disc. Shepard would later move to United Artists Records shortly after the album's release. It was given a positive response from Billboard magazine who called it a "strong entry" that should be "sure to prove a big seller".

Despite this prediction, the album's three singles reached positions outside the country songs top 40 charts in the US and Canada. The album's release was preceded by its lead single in November 1971 called "Safe in These Lovin' Arms of Mine". It climbed to the number 55 position on the US Billboard country songs chart. The next single released from the album was "Virginia" in March 1972. The song went to the number 68 position on the US country songs chart. In July 1972, the title track was issued as the album's third single. It reached number 46 on the US country songs chart and number 65 on the Canadian RPM Country Tracks chart.

== Track listing ==
Side one
No.	Title	Writer(s)	Length
1.	"Just Like Walkin' in the Sunshine"	N. Merritt; A. Woodward	2:22
2.	"I've Loved Him Much Longer Than You"	R. Bourker; G. Barnhill	2:30
3.	"We Good Good Together"	Milton Blackford	2:10
4.	"Virginia"	Don Reid	2:48
5.	"Lonesome End of the Line"	Chuck Rogers	2:05

Side two
No.	Title	Writer(s)	Length
1.	"Love Will Always Be There"	Jerry Chesnut	2:23
2.	"Candlelighted World"	Red Lane	2:33
3.	"Safe in These Lovin' Arms of Mine"	E. Mitchell; B. Sherrill; N. Wilson	2:35
4.	"Singin' the Blues"	Melvin Endsley	1:55
5.	"Thank Goodness It's Forever"	J. Foster; B. Rice	2:20

== Release history ==
Region	Date	Format	Label	Ref.
North America	September 1972	Vinyl LP Stereo	Capitol Records	
