= I'll Do Anything It Takes =

Studio album by Jean Shepard
- Released: July 1974
- Recorded: 1973–1974
- Genre: Country
- Label: United Artists
- Producer: Larry Butler

Jean Shepard chronology
Slippin' Away (1973)	I'll Do Anything It Takes (1974)	Poor Sweet Baby...And Ten More Bill Anderson Songs (1975)

Singles from I'll Do Anything It Takes
- 1. "At the Time" Released: February 1974; 2. "I'll Do Anything It Takes (To Stay with You)" Released: May 1974

I'll Do Anything It Takes is a studio album by American country singer Jean Shepard. It was released in July 1974 by United Artists Records and was her twenty first studio album. The album was a collection of 11 tracks, which featured subjects about romance and devotion. It was reviewed by various music publications following its release, including AllMusic, which rated it three out of five stars. Two singles were included on the album that reached the US country songs top 20: the title track and "At the Time".

== Background, recording and content ==
One of the first women in country music to become commercially successful, Jean Shepard had continued success for 20 years between the 1950s and 1970s. In the early part of the 1970s, she moved from Capitol Records to United Artists Records. The production and story lines found within her music changed from honky tonk towards subjects of devotion. This allowed Shepard's commercial success to continue into the 1970s when country was moving towards pop-inspired trends. Such themes were subjects of songs such as 1974's "I'll Do Anything It Takes (To Stay with You)", which inspired her album of the same name. I'll Do Anything It Takes were recorded in sessions held between 1973 and 1974. The album project was produced by Larry Butler. I'll Do Anything It Takes was a collection of 11 tracks. Like the title track, the song "At the Time" also had themes centered around devotion. Also included were cover tunes such as "Silver Threads and Golden Needles" and "He Thinks I Still Care".

== Release and critical reception ==
I'll Do Anything It Takes was released by United Artists Records in July 1974. It was the twenty first studio album in Shepard's career and second with the label. It was distributed as both a vinyl LP and a 8-track cartridge. Six tracks were included on "side one" and five tracks were included on "side two". It was given reviews from music magazines and websites following its release. Cashbox called it "A must for all her fans and a definite programming super-package." Record World magazine called it "a superb listening experience" that "will be a delight to programmers everywhere." Greg Adams of the online website AllMusic rated I'll Do Anything It Takes three out of five stars. He compared the song choices and production to that of Tammy Wynette and found songs like "At the Time" to express "extreme devotion".

== Chart performance and singles ==
I'll Do Anything It Takes reached the US Billboard Top Country Albums chart following its release, peaking at the number 21 position in late 1974. It was among her final albums to chart the US country survey during her career. Two singles were included on the album. Its lead single was "At the Time", which was issued by United Artists in February in 1974. It rose to the top 20 of the Billboard country songs chart, peaking at number 13 in 1974. It also made Canada's RPM country songs chart, peaking at number 24 around the same time. In May 1974, the title track was issued as the next single. It was Shepard's second top 20 single in a row on the US country chart, climbing to the number 17 position.

== Track listing ==
Side one
No.	Title	Writer(s)	Length
1.	"At the Time"	B. Anderson	2:30
2.	"I Love"	T. T. Hall	2:24
3.	"Let Me Be There"	J. Rostill	2:35
4.	"What I Had with You"	C. Putman; S. Throckmorton	2:23
5.	"Silver Threads and Golden Needles"	D. Reynolds; J. Rhodes	2:11
6.	"I Just Had You on My Mind"	S. Richards	2:55

Side two
No.	Title	Writer(s)	Length
1.	"I'll Do Anything It Takes (To Stay with You)"	L. Butler; J. Crutchfield; C. Putman	2:40
2.	"Would You Lay with Me (In a Field of Stone)"	D. A. Coe	2:37
3.	"I'm Not That Good at Goodbye"	D. Williams; Bob McDill	3:12
4.	"He Thinks I Still Care"	D. Lee	3:08
5.	"Love Came Pouring Down"	L. Butler; C. Putman	2:28

== Personnel ==
All credits are adapted from the liner notes of I'll Do Anything It Takes.

Musical personnel

- Tommy Allsup – Bass guitar
- Stuart Bascore – Steel guitar
- Harold Bradley – Bass guitar
- Jimmy Capps – Rhythm guitar
- Chuck Cochran – Piano
- Jim Colvard – Lead guitar
- Jim Isbell – Drums
- The Jordanaires – Vocals
- Bob Moore – Bass
- Carol Montgomery – Vocalist
- Billy Sanford – Lead guitar
- Jean Shepard – Lead vocals
- Henry Strzelecki – Brass

Technical personnel

- Larry Butler – Producer
- Harold Lee – Engineer

== Chart performance ==
Chart (1974)	Peak position
US Top Country Albums (Billboard)	21

== Release history ==
Region	Date	Format	Label	Ref.
North America	July 1974	Vinyl LP (Stereo); 8-Track Cartridge	United Artists Records	
Australia	July 1974	Vinyl LP (Stereo)	United Artists Records	
United Kingdom	1978	Vinyl LP (Stereo)	Sunset Records	
