= Another Lonely Night =

Another Lonely Night may refer to:

- "Another Lonely Night" (Adam Lambert song), 2015
- "Another Lonely Night" (Jean Shepard song), 1970
