= Here & Now (Jean Shepard album) =

Studio album by Jean Shepard
- Released: March 1971
- Recorded: August–December 1970
- Studio: Jack Clement Recording (Nashville, Tennessee)
- Genre: Country
- Label: Capitol
- Producer: Larry Butler

Jean Shepard chronology
A Woman's Hand (1970)	Here & Now (1971)	Just as Soon as I Get Over Loving You (1971)

Singles from Here & Now
- 1. "Another Lonely Night" Released: October 1970

Here & Now is a studio album by American country singer Jean Shepard. It was released in March 1971 by Capitol Records and was her seventeenth studio album. The album consisted of ten tracks, most of which were covers of songs from the era. Among them were recordings first made popular by Conway Twitty and John Denver. Its only single was a new recording titled "Another Lonely Night". The single reached the top 20 of the US country chart in 1971. Here & Now received positive reviews from both Billboard and Cash Box magazines.

== Background, recording and content ==
Jean Shepard rose to fame in the 1950s and was one of the first female country singers to find success as a solo act. For more than 20 years, her singles and albums made the country popularity charts. Beginning in the 1960s, Shepard became known for singing songs about romance from a feminine perspective. One of them was the 1971 top 20 single "Another Lonely Night", a song about a woman who stays with a partner despite her reluctance about him. "Another Lonely Night" was featured on Shepard's 1971 studio album Here & Now. The album was recorded with producer Larry Butler at the Jack Clement Recording Studio in Nashville, Tennessee between August and December 1970. The album's ten tracks were covers of "contemporary" material, according to Billboard magazine. Covers on the album included Kris Kristofferson's "For the Good Times" and Conway Twitty's "Hello Darlin'".

== Release, critical reception and singles ==
Here & Now was released by Capitol Records in March 1971. It was the seventeenth studio album of Shepard's career and with the Capitol label. The label distributed the album as a vinyl LP, with five songs on either side of the disc. Billboard magazine praised the disc's production and found Shepard's covers to be "strong items". Cash Box magazine gave praise to Shepard's artistry on the disc, "There's more to singing than just singing. There's feeling and sincerity. Choice of material and audience appeal. There's Jean Shepard. Tops in every category." The album's only single was "Another Lonely Night", which Capitol originally issued in October 1970. The single reached the top 20 of the US Billboard country songs chart, rising to the number 12 position in early 1971.

== Track listing ==
Side one
No.	Title	Writer(s)	Length
1.	"Another Lonely Night"	J. Crutchfield; L. Butler	2:20
2.	"For the Good Times"	Kris Kristofferson	4:02
3.	"Marty Gray"	Walter Woodward	2:45
4.	"Season for Sin"	Wayne P. Walker	2:58
5.	"Leaving on a Jet Plane"	John Denver	3:10

Side two
No.	Title	Writer(s)	Length
1.	"Look at Mine"	T. Hatch; J. Trent	2:20
2.	"Hello Darlin'"	Conway Twitty	2:28
3.	"Snowbird"	Gene MacLellan	2:03
4.	"The Wonders You Perform"	Jerry Chesnut	3:30
5.	"Next Bus Back to Georgia"	Rudie Whaling	2:18

== Release history ==
Region	Date	Format	Label	Ref.
North America	March 1971	Vinyl LP (Stereo); Vinyl LP (Club Edition)	Capitol Records	
