= Then He Touched Me =

Single by Jean Shepard

from the album A Woman's Hand
- B-side: "Only Mama That'll Walk the Line"
- Released: December 1969
- Recorded: June 1969
- Studio: Columbia (Nashville, Tennessee)
- Genre: Country
- Length: 2:45
- Label: Capitol
- Songwriters: George Richey; Norris Wilson
- Producer: Larry Butler

Jean Shepard singles chronology
"Seven Lonely Days" (1969)	"Then He Touched Me" (1969)	"A Woman's Hand" (1970)

"Then He Touched Me" is a song originally recorded by American country singer Jean Shepard. Written by George Richey and Norro Wilson, it reached the top ten of the US country chart and was nominated by the Grammy Awards. It was Shepard's ninth top ten single in her career and was included on her 1970 album A Woman's Hand.

== Background ==
Jean Shepard would have 20 years of commercial success as a country music singer. Beginning in the 1950s honky tonk era, she topped the charts with "A Dear John Letter" and reached the top ten with "A Satisfied Mind". After a period of limited success, Shepard's 1964 single "Second Fiddle (To an Old Guitar)" reached the top ten. This would be followed in the 1960s and 1970s by a series of top 40 country singles. Among them were several top ten singles including "Then He Touched Me" in 1970. During the late sixties, Shepard was being produced by Kelso Herston, but found him to be unprofessional on recording sessions. She instead sought out an up-and-coming producer named Larry Butler.

== Recording and content ==
Butler was given permission by Herston to start recording Shepard. Their 1969 single "Seven Lonely Days" proved to be a commercial success and the two would continue working together on "Then He Touched Me". The song was written by George Richey and Norro Wilson (incorrectly spelled as "Norris Wilson" on the single release). The storyline of "Then He Touched Me" is based on a woman who felt discouraged about ever falling in love again until she meets someone who changes her mind. Butler produced the track at the Columbia Studios in June 1969, located in Nashville, Tennessee.

== Release, critical reception and chart performance ==
"Then He Touched Me" was released as a single in December 1969 by the Capitol label. It was backed on the B-side by Shepard's cover of "Only Daddy That'll Walk the Line" (titled instead as "Only Mama That'll Walk the Line"). The label distributed the single as a seven-inch vinyl single. Cash Box named among its "picks of the week" and called the song a "feelingful ballad" that features "a big country sound in fine style". "Then He Touched Me" charted through early 1970, placing at number eight on the US Billboard Hot Country Songs chart. It became Shepard's ninth top ten Billboard single and her first top ten song there since 1966's "If Teardrops Were Silver". It would be her last top ten single there until 1973's "Slippin' Away. It was also her second single to make Canada's RPM Country Tracks chart, reaching number 27. The song was later included on Shepard's 1970 studio album A Woman's Hand. In 1971, the song was nominated for the Grammy Award for Best Female Country Vocal Performance. It was Shepard's second nomination from the Grammy Awards.

== Track listings ==
7" vinyl single

- "Then He Touched Me" – 2:45
- "Only Mama That'll Walk the Line" – 2:13

== Charts ==
Weekly chart performance for "Then He Touched Me"
Chart (1969–1970)	Peak position
Canada Country Tracks (RPM)	27
US Hot Country Songs (Billboard)	8

== Accolades ==
Year	Nominee / work	Award	Result	Ref.
1971	13th Annual Grammy Awards	Best Country Vocal Performance, Female	Nominated	
