= A Woman's Hand (album) =

Studio album by Jean Shepard
- Released: September 1970
- Recorded: July 1969
- Studio: Columbia (Nashville, Tennessee)
- Genre: Country
- Label: Capitol
- Producer: Larry Butler

Jean Shepard chronology
Best by Request (1970)	A Woman's Hand (1970)	Here & Now (1971)

Singles from A Woman's Hand
- 1. "Then He Touched Me" Released: December 1969; 2. "A Woman's Hand" Released: March 1970; 3. "I Want You Free" Released: July 1970

A Woman's Hand is a studio album by American country singer Jean Shepard. It was released in September 1970 by Capitol Records and was her sixteenth studio album. The collection of ten tracks featured a series of cover tunes by male country artists. Some of the songs were new material. Among them were its three singles: "Then He Touched Me", "I Want You Free" and the title track. Of the three, "Then He Touched Me" was its highest-charting, reaching the top ten on the US country chart. A Woman's Hand was reviewed positively by both Billboard and Cash Box magazines.

== Background, recording and content ==
Jean Shepard was one of the first female country artists to find commercial success as solo act. Between the 1950s and 1970s, Shepard continuously made the country music popularity charts. In the late sixties, Shepard made the transition from working with Kelso Herston to aspiring record producer Larry Butler. Under his production, Shepard reached the top 20 with 1969's "Seven Lonely Days" and then reached the top ten with 1970's "Then He Touched Me". The latter would be featured on Shepard's A Woman's Hand LP.

A Woman's Hand was Shepard's second studio album produced by Larry Butler. The project was recorded at the Columbia Studios (located in Nashville, Tennessee) in July 1969. The album project contained a total of ten tracks. Several of the songs on the album were covers of country hits by male performers. This included songs by Bill Anderson ("I'll Live for You"), Buck Owens ("Maybe If I Close My Eyes It'll Go Away") and Hank Williams ("I Can't Help It (If I'm Still in Love with You)"). Among its new songs was "Then He Touched Me", which was written by George Richey and Norro Wilson.

== Release, critical reception and singles ==
A Woman's Hand was released by Capitol Records in September 1970. It was Shepard's sixteenth studio album in her career. Capitol distributed the album as a vinyl LP, with five songs on either side of the record. The project received positive reviews from music magazines following its release. Billboard wrote, "Emotion, tenderness and sincerity are spelled out in the voice of Jean Shepard as she sings these fine tunes." Cash Box magazine wrote, "A woman's hand can do a lot, but when the woman is Jean Shepard, her voice can do a lot more as is evidenced by this beautifully overpowering LP."

A total of three singles were included on A Woman's Hand. The first single released was "Then He Touched Me" in December 1969. The song became her ninth top ten single on the US Billboard country songs chart, peaking at number eight. March 1970 saw the release of the title track as the second single. It was rose to the US Billboard country top 30, peaking at number 23. The third and last single released was "I Want You Free" in July 1970. It was also a top 30 US country chart single, peaking at number 22.

== Track listing ==
Side one
No.	Title	Writer(s)	Length
1.	"A Woman's Hand"	Jan Crutchfield	2:22
2.	"Born to Be with You"	Don Robertson	2:23
3.	"My Arms Stay Open Late"	C. Putman; D. Lomax	2:20
4.	"I'll Live for You"	Bill Anderson	2:35
5.	"What Went Wrong"	Nancy Apple	1:56

Side two
No.	Title	Writer(s)	Length
1.	"I Want You Free"	Martha Sharpe	2:43
2.	"Then He Touched Me"	G. Richey; N. Wilson	2:44
3.	"I Love You More Today"	L. E. White	2:20
4.	"Maybe If I Close My Eyes (It'll Go Away)"	Buck Owens	2:13
5.	"I Can't Help It (If I'm Still in Love with You)"	Hank Williams	2:29

== Release history ==
Region	Date	Format	Label	Ref.
North America	September 1970	Vinyl LP (Stereo)	Capitol Records	
