= I Want You Free =

Single by Jean Shepard

from the album A Woman's Hand
- B-side: "Be Nice to Everybody"
- Released: July 1970
- Recorded: July 1969
- Studio: Columbia (Nashville, Tennessee)
- Genre: Country
- Length: 2:21
- Label: Capitol
- Songwriter(s): Martha Sharpe
- Producer(s): Larry Butler

Jean Shepard singles chronology
"A Woman's Hand" (1970)	"I Want You Free" (1970)	"Another Lonely Night" (1970)

"I Want You Free" is a song written by Martha Sharpe and first recorded by American country singer Jean Shepard. Released as a single in 1970, it reached the top 40 of the US country songs chart. It was later included on Shepard's 1970 album A Woman's Hand and received reviews from two music publications following its release.

== Background and recording ==
Jean Shepard first rose to fame during country music's fifties honky tonk era, but managing to have 20 years of commercial success. This included a comeback in the middle sixties and a second comeback in the early seventies. In 1969, she reached the top 20 with "Seven Lonely Days", followed by a series of top 40 charting singles through 1971. Among them was "I Want You Free". Written by Martha Sharpe, the song was described by Billboard magazine as a "rhythm ballad". "I Want You Free" was produced by Larry Butler in July 1969 at the Columbia Studios in Nashville, Tennessee.

== Release, critical reception and chart performance ==
"I Want You Free" was released in July 1970 by Capitol Records as a single. It was issued as a seven-inch vinyl single. On its B-side was the track "Be Nice to Everybody". Cash Box magazine praised the track believing that fans would enjoy her latest single. Billboard believed the song would make their top 20 singles chart that year, highlighting her vocals and a change in musical style. Although this was predicted, "I Want You Free" peaked outside the top 20, reaching the number 22 position on the US Billboard Hot Country Songs chart in 1970. It was then included in Shepard's 1970 studio album titled A Woman's Hand.

== Track listings ==
7" vinyl single

- "I Want You Free" – 2:40
- "Be Nice to Everybody" – 2:01

== Charts ==
Weekly chart performance for "I Want You Free"
Chart (1970)	Peak position
US Hot Country Songs (Billboard)	22
