= Seven Lonely Days (album) =

Studio album by Jean Shepard
- Released: September 1969
- Recorded: January–June 1969
- Studio: Columbia (Nashville, Tennessee)
- Genre: Country; honky tonk
- Label: Capitol
- Producer: Larry Butler

Jean Shepard chronology
I'll Fly Away (1969)	Seven Lonely Days (1969)	Best by Request (1970)

Singles from Seven Lonely Days
- 1. "I'm Tied Around Your Finger" Released: March 1969; 2. "Seven Lonely Days" Released: August 1969

Seven Lonely Days is a studio album by American country singer Jean Shepard. It was released in September 1969 by Capitol Records and was her fourteenth studio album. The ten-track collection featured several covers, including the title track. Released as a single, the title track reached the top 20 of the US country songs chart. The album itself also reached the US country albums survey. Seven Lonely Days received reviews from both music magazines and music websites following its release.

== Background ==
Jean Shepard had 20 years of commercial success in the country genre, beginning with the number one single "A Dear John Letter" (1953). Through the genre's honky tonk era, she had further top ten singles like "A Satisfied Mind" (1955). After a dip in commercial appeal, she returned with the top ten single "Second Fiddle (To an Old Guitar)" (1964). Her return in the sixties led to 15 more top 40 singles. Among them was the top 20 single "Seven Lonely Days" in 1969. During this period, Shepard was being produced by Kelso Herston. Larry Butler asked Herston if he could produce Shepard. Herston agreed and the first single produced by Butler was "Seven Lonely Days".

== Recording and content ==
Seven Lonely Days was recorded with Larry Butler in sessions between January and June 1969. The sessions were held at the Columbia Studios in Nashville, Tennessee. The album was a collection of ten tracks. Among its tracks was "I'm Tied Around Your Finger", a song that AllMusic's Greg Adams compared to Tammy Wynette's "Stand by Your Man" in terms of lyrical content. "Second Place" and "You Know Where You Can Go" were compared to the lyrical content of "Second Fiddle (To an Old Guitar)". Other songs were covers, such as the title track, which was first a hit single by Georgia Gibbs. Shepard also covered Sonny James's "Invisible Tears" and Merle Haggard's "Today I Started Loving You Again". Waylon Jennings's "Only Daddy That'll Walk the Line" was reworked from the point of view of a woman and was called "Only Mama That'll Walk the Line".

== Release, critical reception, chart performance and singles ==
Professional ratings
Review scores
Source	Rating
Allmusic	3/5 stars

Seven Lonely Days was released by Capitol Records in September 1969. It was distributed as a vinyl LP, with five songs on each side of the record. It was Shepard's fourteenth studio album in her career. The album was given reviews from music magazines and websites. Billboard magazine called it a "must merchandise for the country dealer and country deejay". The magazine further commented, "Jean Shepard has the true sound, and listener knows she is for real." Cash Box magazine found it to consist of "familiar ballads all of which deserve to be heard again and again". Greg Adams of the online site AllMusic rated it three out of five stars, highlighting songs and discussing Shepard's career at the time.

Seven Lonely Days reached the number 42 position on the US Billboard Top Country Albums chart. It was Shepard's second lowest-charting album on Billboard up to that point. It was her ninth album to make the country albums chart. The first single was "I'm Tied Around Your Finger", which was first issued in March 1969. It reached number 69 on the US Billboard Hot Country Songs chart. The title track was the next single released in August 1969. It was Shepard's first top 20 single since 1967, reaching number 18 on the US country songs chart. In Canada, it reached number 34 on the RPM Country Tracks chart, becoming her first single to make their record survey.

== Track listing ==
Side one
No.	Title	Writer(s)	Length
1.	"Seven Lonely Days"	Earl Shuman; Alden Shuman; Marshall Brown	2:22
2.	"Today I Started Loving You Again"	Merle Haggard	2:33
3.	"Only Mama That'll Walk the Line"	Ivy J. Bryant	2:13
4.	"Invisible Tears"	Ned Miller; Sue Miller	2:10
5.	"D-I-V-O-R-C-E"	Bobby Braddock; Curly Putman	2:49

Side two
No.	Title	Writer(s)	Length
1.	"I'm Tied Around Your Finger"	John Paul Jones; Patsy Jones	2:45
2.	"Second Place"	Jack Rhodes; Buddy Lackey	2:10
3.	"You're Telling Me Sweet Lies Again"	G. Cox; J. Rhodes	2:24
4.	"You Know Where You Can Go"	J.P. Jones; P. Jones	2:12
5.	"Someone's Heartache"	Charlie Louvin	2:49

== Chart performance ==
Chart (1969)	Peak position
US Top Country Albums (Billboard)	42

== Release history ==
Region	Date	Format	Label	Ref.
North America	September 1969	Vinyl LP (Stereo)	Capitol Records	
North America	September 1969	Vinyl LP (Club Edition)	Capitol Records	
