= Lonesome Love =

Studio album by Jean Shepard
- Released: December 1958
- Recorded: May 1958
- Studio: Bradley Studios (Nashville, Tennessee)
- Genre: Country; Bakersfield sound
- Label: Capitol
- Producer: Ken Nelson

Jean Shepard chronology
Songs of a Love Affair (1956)	Lonesome Love (1958)	Got You on My Mind (1961)

Lonesome Love is a studio album by American country artist Jean Shepard. The album was released in December 1958 by Capitol Records and was produced by Ken Nelson. It was another album released by another central theme, focused mostly on songs about lost love. The album was a collection of 12 tracks, featuring both new material and cover tunes. It was met with positive reviews from music publications following its release.

== Background ==
Jean Shepard had found commercial country music success at Capitol Recordings recording duets with Ferlin Husky. In 1955, her first pair of solo singles made the US country chart top ten. The following year, her debut studio album Songs of a Love Affair was released. In 1959, she had a top 2 US country single with "I Want to Go Where No One Knows Me". Her second solo project Lonesome Love was released shortly after this.

== Recording and content ==
The album was recorded in May 1958 at the Bradley Film and Recording Studio in Nashville, Tennessee. It was among Shepard's first sessions held in Nashville after years recording in Hollywood, California. After Shepard had moved to Nashville, she flew back to Hollywood to record. However, she later discovered that she was paying for own airfare because it was coming out of her royalties. After that, Shepard began recording in Nashville, where producer Ken Nelson would fly himself there. Lonesome Love consisted of 12 tracks. Boys Life found the album to be a collection of "sad songs", while the album's liner notes called it a collection of "love songs". Along with new material by Harlan Howard, Getrude Cox and Jack Rhodes, the album also featured covers of "I'll Never Be Free", "You Win Again" and "I Love You Because".

== Release and critical reception ==
Professional ratings
Review scores
Source	Rating
Allmusic	4/5 stars
Billboard	4/5 stars

Lonesome Love was originally released in December 1958 by Capitol Records. It was originally distributed as a vinyl LP with six tracks on either side of the record. It was Shepard's second studio album in her career. In the 2010s decade, it was released to digital platforms which included Apple Music. Boys Life gave the album a positive response, finding that the collection gave a "positive result for the listener". Billboard gave it four stars in their review, calling it an "excellent country package". The magazine further wrote that the album carries "the flavor of the true country weeper". AllMusic later gave the project four and a half out of five stars.

== Track listing ==
Side one

1. "Thief in the Night" – (Harlan Howard)
2. "I'll Hold You in My Heart" – (Eddy Arnold, Vic McAlpin, Howard Horton)
3. "The Weak and the Strong" – (Red Hayes)
4. "You'd Better Go" – (Howard, Wynn Stewart)
5. "Sweet Temptation" – (Cliffie Stone, Merle Travis)
6. "I'll Never Be Free" – (Bennie Benjamin, George David Weiss)

Side two

1. "You Win Again" – (Hank Williams)
2. "I Hate Myself" – (E.M. Vandall)
3. "You're Telling Me Sweet Lies Again" – (Gertrude Cox, Jack Rhodes)
4. "Memory" – (Cox)
5. "You Can't Break the Chains of Love" – (Lew Porter, Jimmy Wakely, Fred Tableporter)
6. "I Love You Because" – (Leon Payne)

== Release history ==
Region	Date	Format	Label	Ref.
North America	December 1958	Vinyl LP (Mono)	Capitol Records	
United Kingdom	1959	Vinyl LP (33 RPM) (Mono)	Stetson	
North America	circa 2010	Music download; streaming	Capitol Records Nashville	
