= A Woman's Hand =

1969 single by Barbara Fairchild

Single by Barbara Fairchild

from the album Someone Special
- B-side: "Got a Chance and I Took It"
- Released: July 1969
- Recorded: June 1969
- Studio: Columbia (Nashville, Tennessee)
- Genre: Country
- Length: 2:27
- Label: Columbia
- Songwriter: Jan Crutchfield
- Producer: Billy Sherrill

Barbara Fairchild singles chronology
"Love Is a Gentle Thing" (1969)	"A Woman's Hand" (1969)	"A Girl Who'll Satisfy Her Man" (1970)

"A Woman's Hand" is a song written by Jan Crutchfield. It was originally recorded by American country singer Barbara Fairchild and was released as a single in 1969. Her version entered the top 70 of the US country songs chart. It was notably recorded by American country singer Jean Shepard whose version was released as a separate single in 1970. Shepard's version reached the top 30 of the US country chart. Both songs appeared on individual studio albums by each recording artist.

== Barbara Fairchild version ==
In 1972, Barbara Fairchild topped the country charts and crossed over to the pop charts with "The Teddy Bear Song". Prior to that, Fairchild had a series of charting singles following signing with Columbia Records. Among them was 1969's "A Woman's Hand". The Jan Crutchfield-penned tune was recorded in June 1969 at the Columbia Studios in Nashville, Tennessee. The session was produced by Billy Sherrill. The song was released by Columbia Records in July 1969 and was backed on the B-side by the song "Got a Chance and I Took It". Billboard magazine predicted the song would soon enter its country chart in their July 26 issue. Their prediction was proven when Fairchild's version of the song reached number 66 on the US Billboard Hot Country Songs chart. It was Fairchild's second song to enter the Billboard country chart. It was then included on Fairchild's 1970 debut studio album Someone Special.

=== Track listings ===
7" vinyl single

- "A Woman's Hand" – 2:27
- "Got a Chance and I Took It" – 2:15

=== Charts ===
Weekly chart performance for "A Woman's Hand"
Chart (1969)	Peak position
US Hot Country Songs (Billboard)	66

== Jean Shepard version ==
"A Woman's Hand"

Single by Jean Shepard

from the album A Woman's Hand
- B-side: "What Went Wrong"
- Released: March 1970
- Recorded: July 1969
- Studio: Columbia Studio
- Genre: Country
- Length: 2:21
- Label: Capitol
- Songwriter: Jan Crutchfield
- Producer: Larry Butler

Jean Shepard singles chronology
"Then He Touched Me" (1970)	"A Woman's Hand" (1970)	"I Want You Free" (1970)

Jean Shepard's version of "A Woman's Hand" was the highest-peaking on the US country chart. Beginning in the 1950s and ending in the 1970s, Jean Shepard went on to have 20 years of success as a commercial country singer. This began with songs during country music's honky tonk era and scoring a comeback in the middle sixties. Her singles reached progressively lower positions until her resurgence with the 1969 top 20 song "Seven Lonely Days" and followed by the top ten "Then He Touched Me". Shepard's next four releases reached top 40 country chart positions including "A Woman's Hand". Shepard's version was produced by Larry Butler in July 1969 at the Columbia Studio in Nashville, Tennessee. The song was described by Cash Box magazine as an "ode".

"A Woman's Hand" was released as a single in March 1970 by Capitol Records. It was issued as a seven-inch vinyl single. On its B-side was the song "What Went Wrong". Cash Box magazine predicted the song would be "a biggie" in terms of commercial success. Billboard magazine predicted the song would place in the top 20 of their country singles chart. Despite this prediction, "A Woman's Hand" peaked outside the top 20, reaching the number 23 position on the US Billboard Hot Country Songs chart in 1970. It was then included in Shepard's 1970 studio album of the same name.

=== Track listings ===
7" vinyl single

- "A Woman's Hand" – 2:21
- "What Went Wrong" – 1:57

=== Charts ===
Weekly chart performance for "A Woman's Hand"
Chart (1970)	Peak position
US Hot Country Songs (Billboard)	23
