= Come on Phone =

Single by Jean Shepard

from the album Slippin' Away
- B-side: "Are You Sincere?"
- Released: October 1973
- Recorded: March 1973
- Studio: House of Cash
- Genre: Country
- Length: 2:12
- Label: United Artists
- Songwriter(s): Johnny Slate; Larry Henley
- Producer(s): Larry Butler

Jean Shepard singles chronology
"Slippin' Away" (1973)	"Come on Phone" (1973)	"At the Time" (1973)

"Come on Phone" is a song originally recorded by American country singer Jean Shepard. Released as a single in 1973, it reached the top 40 of the US and Canadian country songs charts. It was the second single spawned from her 1973 album Slippin' Away. It received positive reviews from music magazines following its release.

== Background and recording ==
One of the first female country artists to find solo success, Jean Shepard had charting country records for 20 years. Beginning in the 1950s, she had sporadic top ten songs. In 1973, she signed with United Artists Records and had her last top ten song that year called "Slippin' Away". Four more of her follow-up singles would reach top 40 positions, including "Come on Phone". Co-written by Johnny Slate and Larry Henley, the song was described as being an "uptempo rocking tune" by Cash Box magazine. "Come on Phone" was recorded at the House of Cash studio in March 1973 and was produced by Larry Butler.

== Release, critical reception and chart performance ==
"Come on Phone" was released as a single in October 1973 by United Artists Records. It was issued as a seven-inch vinyl single. On the B-side was Shepard's cover of "Are You Sincere?". Cash Box magazine thought the song would get quick radio attention and found it production to be "very well done". Billboard named it one of its "recommended" single picks in November 1973. Record World thought the song "comin' on strong" (in reference to the song's title and to the reception from radio stations). "Come on Phone" reached the top 40 of both the US and Canadian country charts. In the US, it reached the number 36 position on the Billboard Hot Country Songs chart. In Canada, it reached the number 28 position on the RPM Country Tracks chart. It was the second single spawned from Shepard's United Artists studio album Slippin' Away.

== Track listings ==
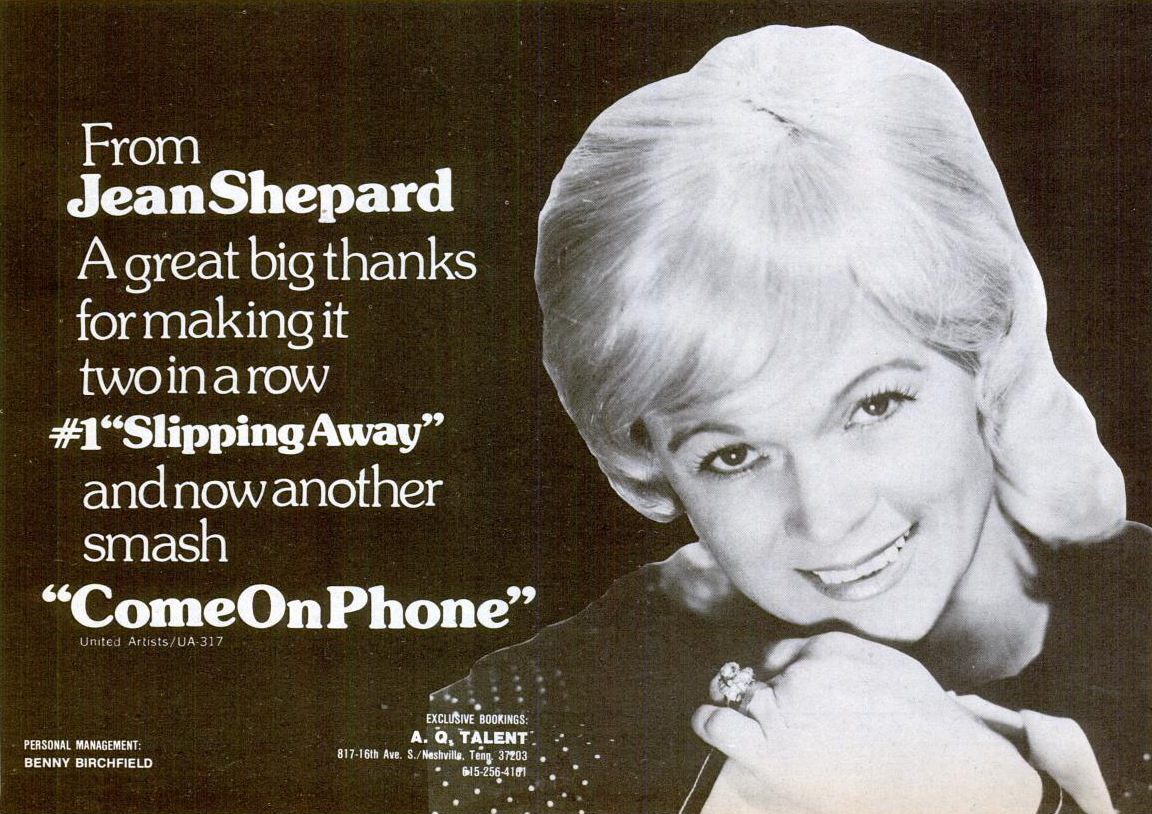
An advertisement for "Come on Phone" in Billboard magazine, 1973

7" vinyl single

- "Come on Phone" – 2:12
- "Are You Sincere?" – 1:59

== Charts ==
Weekly chart performance for "Come on Phone"
Chart (1973)	Peak position
Canada Country Tracks (RPM)	28
US Hot Country Songs (Billboard)	36
