= I'll Do Anything It Takes (To Stay with You) =

Single by Jean Shepard

from the album I'll Do Anything It Takes
- B-side: "Safe in the Love of My Man"
- Released: May 1974
- Recorded: 1974
- Genre: Country
- Length: 2:41
- Label: United Artists
- Songwriter(s): Larry Butler; Curly Putman; Jan Crutchfield
- Producer(s): Larry Butler

Jean Shepard singles chronology
"At the Time" (1974)	"I'll Do Anything It Takes (To Stay with You)" (1974)	"Poor Sweet Baby" (1974)

"I'll Do Anything It Takes (To Stay with You)" is a single by American country music artist Jean Shepard written by Curly Putman, Larry Butler and Jan Crutchfield. Released in May 1974, it was the second single from the album I'll Do Anything It Takes. The song reached number 17 on the Billboard Hot Country Singles chart and was given reviews by publications in the years that followed.

== Background, recording and content ==
Among country music's first successful female singers, Jean Shepard had more than 20 years of charting singles that started in the 1950s and ended in the 1970s. In the early 1970s, she had a comeback partially due to changing the subjects of her songs. Among these songs was the single "I'll Do Anything It Takes (To Stay with You)". Composed by Larry Butler, Curly Putman and Jan Crutchfield the song's concept is centered around staying devoted to a romantic partner. Larry Butler also produced the track and it was recorded in 1974.

== Release, critical reception and chart performance ==
"I'll Do Anything It Takes (To Stay with You)" was released as a single by United Artists Records in May 1974. It was distributed as a seven-inch vinyl single and included a B-side titled "Safe in the Love of My Man". The song was given reviews from music magazines and music websites following its release. Billboard found it to have "excellent production work" and spoke of Shepard's singing, "Another fine sound from Miss Shepard, who is like vintage wine, constantly improving." Cashbox magazine wrote, "A very gentle ballad, Jean's vocal is smooth and has a crying lilt that has always characterized her style as something very special." Greg Adams of the AllMusic website compared the song's lyrical content to that of "Stand by Your Man" by Tammy Wynette. "I'll Do Anything It Takes (To Stay with You)" made the US Billboard Hot Country Songs top 20 list, peaking at the number 17 position in late 1974. It was Shepard's second consecutive top 20 country single. It was the title track to Shepard's 1974 studio album I'll Do Anything It Takes.

== Track listings ==
7" vinyl single

- "I'll Do Anything It Takes (To Stay with You)" – 2:41
- "Safe in the Love of My Man" – 3:24

== Charts ==
Weekly chart performance for "I'll Do Anything It Takes (To Stay with You)"
Chart (1974)	Peak position
US Hot Country Songs (Billboard)	17
