= With His Hand in Mine =

Single by Jean Shepard

from the album Just as Soon as I Get Over Loving You
- B-side: "Just Plain Lonely"
- Released: January 1971
- Recorded: August 1970
- Studio: Jack Clement Studio
- Genre: Country
- Length: 2:45
- Label: Capitol
- Songwriter(s): L. Allen; L. Butler; R. Butler
- Producer(s): Larry Butler

Jean Shepard singles chronology
"Another Lonely Night" (1970)	"With His Hand in Mine" (1971)	"Just as Soon as I Get Over Loving You" (1970)

"With His Hand in Mine" is a song originally recorded by American country singer Jean Shepard. Released as a single in 1971, it reached the top 40 of the US country songs chart. It was later included on her 1971 album Just as Soon as I Get Over Loving You and received reviews from two music publications following its release.

== Background and recording ==
Jean Shepard was among the first female country artists to rise to fame. During the 1950s, she had solo top ten singles, which continued sporadically over the next 20 years. She remained mostly with Capitol Records during her commercial peak. Between 1969 and 1971, Shepard had six top 40 entries on the US country chart. Her sixth entry was "With His Hand in Mine". Written by L. Allen, R. Butler and L Butler, the track was performed in a ballad style. The track was produced by Larry Butler in August 1970 at the Jack Clement Studio in Nashville, Tennessee.

== Release, critical reception and chart performance ==
"With His Hand in Mine" was released in January 1971 by Capitol Records as a single. It was issued as a seven-inch vinyl single. On the B-side was the song "Just Plain Lonely". Cash Box magazine positively wrote, "Jean returns with a magnificently performed ballad guaranteed to please her many many country fans." Billboard predicted that the song would make the top 20 of their country chart, calling Shepard's singing an "emotional performance". Despite its prediction, "With His Hand in Mine" peaked outside the top 20, reaching the number 24 position on the US Billboard Hot Country Songs chart in 1970. It would be Shepard's final top 40 entry there until 1973. "With His Hand in Mine" also became her third single to make Canada's RPM Country Tracks chart, peaking at number 43. It was then included in Shepard's 1971 studio album titled Just as Soon as I Get Over Loving You.

== Track listings ==
7" vinyl single

- "With His Hand in Mine" – 2:45
- "Just Plain Lonely" – 2:20

== Charts ==
Weekly chart performance for "With His Hand in Mine"
Chart (1971)	Peak position
Canada Country Tracks (RPM)	43
US Hot Country Songs (Billboard)	24
