= Slippin' Away (album) =

Studio album by Jean Shepard
- Released: September 1973
- Recorded: March–April 1973
- Studio: House of Cash
- Genre: Country
- Label: United Artists
- Producer: Larry Butler

Jean Shepard chronology
Just Like Walkin' in the Sunshine (1972)	Slippin' Away (1973)	I'll Do Anything It Takes (1974)

Singles from Slippin' Away
- 1. "Slippin' Away" Released: May 1973; 2. "Come on Phone" Released: October 1973

Slippin' Away is a studio album by American country singer Jean Shepard. It was released by United Artists Records in September 1973 and was her twentieth studio album. The album was named for Shepard's top five US and Canadian country single of the same name. The album itself was Shepard's first for United Artists after many years with Capitol Records. It received a positive response from both Billboard and Record World magazines.

== Background ==
One of country music's first successful solo female artists, Jean Shepard rose to fame in the 1950s and had top ten and 20 singles over the next 20 years. Shepard had been with Capitol Records until the early 1970s, but was getting frustrated with the lack of attention the label gave to her recent releases. In February 1973, it was announced that Shepard had moved to United Artists Records. In 1973, her United Artists single "Slippin' Away" made the country top ten. Her first United Artists of the same name would be named for the single.

== Recording and content ==
At first, Larry Butler was working alongside Johnny Cash at Columbia Records until it was announced he would be working as an independent producer at United Artists. With this decision, it was then decided that Butler would serve as Shepard's producer for her next recording sessions. Recording sessions for Slippin' Away were held between March and April 1973 at the House of Cash studios in Hendersonville, Tennessee. Butler was the sole producer on the album. The album contained a total of ten tracks. A majority of the recordings were cover tunes. Covers included "Teddy Bear Song", "'Til I Get It Right", "Funny Face" and "It's Not Love (But It's Not Bad)". The title track was one of the album's few new tracks and was penned by Bill Anderson.

== Release and critical reception ==
Cash Box magazine originally stated that Slippin' Away would be released in mid-August 1973. However, the album was instead released in September 1973 by United Artists Records. The label distributed it as a vinyl LP, with five songs on each side of the disc. Slippin' Away was the twentieth studio album released in Shepard's career. It was given positive reviews from critics following its release. Billboard named it among its "Country Picks" in September 1973, finding that Shepard was "singing better than any time in her life". Critics also predicted high sales, stating, "The titles in this album are very familiar, which should help with the product." Record World magazine also praised the album in September 1973 calling the cover tunes "a solid collection of hits" with "fine readings".

== Chart performance and singles ==
Slippin' Away was Shepard's first album in three years to make the US Billboard Top Country Albums chart, rising to the number 15 position in 1973. It was her third highest-peaking album on the country survey behind two records from 1966. It was one of seven albums by Shepard to make the top 20 of the same survey. Slippin' Away included two singles. Its lead single was the title track, which was initially released by United Artists in May 1973. It rose to the number four position on the US country songs chart and number three on Canada's RPM country chart in 1973. "Come on Phone" was spawned as the second single in October 1973, reaching number 36 on the US country chart and number 28 on the Canadian country chart.

== Track listing ==
Side one
No.	Title	Writer(s)	Length
1.	"Slippin' Away"	B. Anderson	2:27
2.	"The Teddy Bear Song"	D. Earl; N. Nixon	3:02
3.	"The Last Thing on My Mind"	T. Paxton	2:35
4.	"Till I Get It Right"	R. Lane; L. Henley	2:28
5.	"It's Not Love (But It's Not Bad)"	G. Martin; H. Cochran	2:41

Side two
No.	Title	Writer(s)	Length
1.	"Come on Phone"	J. Slate; L. Henley	2:12
2.	"Think I'll Go Somewhere (And Cry Myself to Sleep)"	B. Anderson	2:45
3.	"Funny Face"	D. Fargo	2:27
4.	"Safe in the Love of My Man"	M. Sharp	3:24
5.	"Are You Sincere?"	W. Walker	1:59

== Personnel ==
All credits are adapted from the liner notes of Slippin' Away.

Musical personnel

- Tommy Allsup – Bass
- Stuart Bascore – Steel guitar
- James Capps – Guitar
- Chuck Cochran – Piano
- Jim Colvard – Guitar
- Ray Edenton – Guitar
- Buddy Harman – Drums
- Kelso Herston – Guitar
- Jim Isbell – Drums
- The Jordanaires – Background voice
- Red Lane – Guitar
- Charlie McCoy – Harmonica
- Bob Moore – Bass
- Carol Montgomery – Background voice
- George Richey – Piano
- Jean Shepard – Lead vocals

Technical personnel

- Charlie Bragg – Engineer
- Larry Butler – Producer
- Slick Lawson – Photography
- Harold Lee – Engineer
- Billy Sherrill – Engineer
- Roger Tucker – Engineer

== Chart performance ==
Chart (1973)	Peak position
US Top Country Albums (Billboard)	15

== Release history ==
Region	Date	Format	Label	Ref.
North America	September 1973	Vinyl LP (Stereo)	United Artists Records	
Australia	September 1973	Vinyl LP (Stereo)	United Artists Records	
