= Another Lonely Night (Jean Shepard song) =

Single by Jean Shepard

from the album Here & Now
- B-side: "You're Name's Become a Household Word"
- Released: October 1970
- Recorded: August 1970
- Studio: Jack Clement Studio
- Genre: Country
- Length: 2:06
- Label: Capitol
- Songwriter(s): Jan Crutchfield; Larry Butler
- Producer(s): Larry Butler

Jean Shepard singles chronology
"I Want You Free" (1970)	"Another Lonely Night" (1970)	"With His Hand in Mine" (1971)

"Another Lonely Night" is a song written by Jan Crutchfield and Larry Butler. It was released as a single by both Jean Shepard (1970) and Jody Miller (1977). Shepard's version was the highest-charting, rising into the top 20 of the US country chart in 1971. Her version was included on her 1971 studio album Here and Now. Miller's version also made the US country chart, but only rose into the top 80 after its release. Both versions were reviewed by Billboard magazine following their individual releases.

== Jean Shepard version ==
=== Background, recording and content ===
Jean Shepard was one of the first solo female artists to have commercial success. Beginning in the 1950s, she had top ten singles like "A Satisfied Mind" and "I Thought of You". In the 1960s, she returned to the top ten with "Second Fiddle (To an Old Guitar)" and continued to place singles on the country charts through 1978. Her later singles were said to bring a feminine perspective to that of romance. Among examples of this was 1970's "Another Lonely Night". Written by Larry Butler and Jan Crutchfield, the song told the story of a woman to continuously comes back to a partner whom she knows does not work for her. The track was also produced by Larry Butler. He produced Shepard in August 1970 at the Jack Clement Studio, located in Nashville, Tennessee.

=== Release, critical reception and chart performance ===
"Another Lonely Night" was issued as a single by Capitol Records in October 1970. Included on its B-side was the song "Your Name's Become a Household Word". Capitol distributed it as a seven-inch vinyl single. Billboard called the song "a clever rhythm ballad" and predicted that it would make the top 20 of their country chart. The prediction was proven correct when in 1971, the song rose to the number 12 position on the US Billboard Hot Country Songs chart. It was Shepard's sixteenth single to place in the Billboard country top 20. In 1971, it was included on her studio album Here & Now.

=== Track listings ===
7" vinyl single

- "Another Lonely Night" – 2:06
- "Your Name's Become a Household Word" – 2:49

=== Charts ===
Weekly chart performance for "Another Lonely Night"
Chart (1970–1971)	Peak position
US Hot Country Songs (Billboard)	12

== Jody Miller version ==
"Another Lonely Night"

Single by Jody Miller
- B-side: "All Night Long"
- Released: July 1977
- Recorded: May 1977
- Genre: Country
- Length: 2:01
- Label: Epic
- Songwriter(s): Jan Crutchfield; Larry Butler
- Producer(s): Larry Butler

Jody Miller singles chronology
"Spread a Little Love Around" (1977)	"Another Lonely Night" (1977)	"Soft Lights and Slow Sexy Music" (1977)

"Another Lonely Night" was notably covered by American singer Jody Miller. After having several top ten singles in the early 1970s like "He's So Fine" and "There's a Party Goin' On", Miller's singles reached lowers US country chart positions in the second half of the decade. One of charting singles was 1977's "Another Lonely Night". Miller had recorded the song with Larry Butler also serving as her producer. The session took place in May 1977. Miller's single was issued by Epic Records in September 1977 also as a seven-inch vinyl single. It was backed on the B-side by the song "All Night Long". Billboard magazine named it one of its "recommended" songs in its listing of "Top Single Picks" in September 1977. It became her lowest-charting single on the US Billboard country songs chart up to that point, rising to number 76 in 1977.

=== Track listings ===
7" vinyl single

- "Another Lonely Night" – 2:01
- "All Night Long" – 2:45

=== Charts ===
Weekly chart performance for "Another Lonely Night"
Chart (1977)	Peak position
US Hot Country Songs (Billboard)	76
