= Jean Shepard =

American country singer (1933–2016)

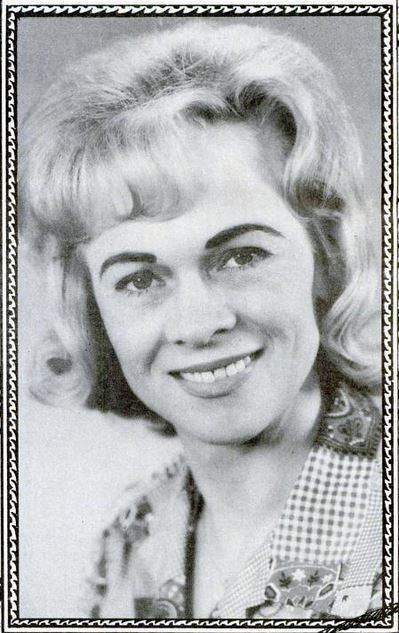
- Jean Shepard, 1967.
- Born: Ollie Imogene Shepard; November 21, 1933; Pauls Valley, Oklahoma, U.S.
- Died: September 25, 2016 (aged 82); Gallatin, Tennessee, U.S.
- Occupation: Singer
- Years active: 1952–2015
- Works: Discography
- Spouses: Freddie (m. 1951; ann. 1951); (Note: In her autobiography, Shepard stated she was briefly married (and later annulled) to a man named Freddie but did not provide a last name.); Hawkshaw Hawkins (m. 1960; died 1963); Archie Summers (m. 1966; div. 1968); Benny Birchfield (m. 1968)
- Children: 3
- Musical career
- Genres: Country; Bakersfield Sound; honky tonk; Nashville Sound; traditional country
- Instrument: Vocals
- Labels: Capitol; United Artists; Scorpion; First Generation; Round Robin; Country Harvest; Ernest Tubb; Raney

Ollie Imogene "Jean" Shepard (November 21, 1933 – September 25, 2016), was an American country singer who was considered one of the genre's first significant female artists. Her commercial success ran from the 1950s to the 1970s while also being a member of the Grand Ole Opry for 60 years.

Shepard was born in Oklahoma and raised in California with her nine siblings. Having a musical upbringing, she formed an all-female country-music band, The Melody Ranch Girls. She was heard by country artist Hank Thompson, who helped her get her first recording contract at age 18 with Capitol Records. Her second single, "A Dear John Letter" with Ferlin Husky, topped the country charts in 1953. In 1955, she had her first solo single top-10 successes with "A Satisfied Mind", "I Thought of You", and "Beautiful Lies". During this period she was among the first female country performers to headline shows and be played consistently on country music radio.

In 1963, Shepard's husband Hawkshaw Hawkins was killed in a plane crash. She considered ending her career, then returned and in 1964 had her first top-10 single in nine years, "Second Fiddle (To an Old Guitar)". She had 15 more top-40 US country singles during the decade, including the top-10 recordings "If Teardrops Were Silver", "I'll Take the Dog", and "Then He Touched Me". With a dip in commercial success, Shepard became frustrated with Capitol's lack of promotion to her material and moved to United Artists Records. In 1973 at age 40 she had a comeback with the top-10 song "Slippin' Away". Four more of her singles reached the US country top 20 during the 1970s.

Shepard became part of the Association of Country Entertainers (ACE) in the 1970s, which advocated for traditional country music. Her criticism of the genre's country pop trends ultimately cost Shepard her recording contract from United Artists. Ultimately, the ACE disbanded and Shepard filed for bankruptcy. Shepard continued touring and became popular in Europe, especially in the UK. She continued sporadically recording as well, releasing her last studio album in 2000. She was inducted into the Country Music Hall of Fame and Museum in 2011 and continued performing through 2015. Her musical legacy influenced the future careers of Loretta Lynn, Dolly Parton and Tammy Wynette.

== Early life ==
Ollie Imogene Shepard was born in Pauls Valley, Oklahoma on November 21, 1933, one of 10 children born to Allie Mae Isaac Shepard and Hoit A. Shepard, sharecroppers who raised cotton, sugarcane and peanuts. Her father worked additional jobs, including sewing burlap sacks at the Paul's Valley Alfalfa Mill. When she was three, the family moved to Hugo, Oklahoma to be closer to her paternal grandparents. In Hugo, the Shepard family lived in a four-room house with little furniture while Hoit Shepard received a government loan to sharecrop with another farmer. Along with many Oklahoma farmers during the Dust Bowl, the Shepard family moved west. In 1943, the family settled in Visalia, California.

In Visalia, Shepard skipped the third grade at Lynnwood Elementary School. In high school, she attended an accredited country music course and participated in the school's glee club. She recalled being teased in her teen years for being an "Okie" who liked country music. In tenth grade, Shepard and some friends formed an all-female country music band named the Melody Ranch Girls. Shepard played the upright bass and sang lead vocals in the group. Her parents pawned their home's furniture to buy the instrument. She began playing alongside the Melody Ranch Girls every weekend during her high school years. Shepard recalled being so tired after gigs that her teachers would let her sleep during school hours. Shepard then graduated from high school at age 17.

The Melody Ranch Girls continued performing following high school, finding gigs in northern California, Oregon and Washington state. The group split after many of the band members got married. Prior to their disbandment, country performer Hank Thompson heard Shepard singing in the group. Thompson was impressed and told Shepard that he would secure her a recording contract. She heard back from Thompson several months later.

Hank Thompson brought an acetate recording of Shepard to Ken Nelson at Capitol Records. Female country artists were not yet in vogue, so Nelson was hesitant to sign her to a contract. He told Thompson, "There's just no place in country music for women. But every band needs a girl singer." Nelson then went to see Shepard perform live and was impressed. He offered her a contract, which had to be approved by a court judge because she was only 18 years old. Because the judge did not have background in the music industry, Shepard brought the contract to a radio executive who gave it his blessing. She officially signed with Capitol Records in 1952.

== Career ==
=== 1952–1962: Initial success ===
On September 30, 1952, Shepard made her first Capitol recordings in Hollywood, California. In February 1953, Capitol released her debut single, "Crying Steel Guitar Waltz". The single was co-billed with steel guitar player Speedy West in belief that female country acts could not sell records alone. The single did not reach the charts. Ferlin Husky then approached Nelson with a song previously recorded and played in California called "A Dear John Letter". The song told the story of a Korean War soldier who receives a breakup letter from his female partner. In May 1953, the song was recorded with Shepard singing and Husky performing a spoken recitation. In July 1953, it was issued as a single and reached the number one spot on the US country songs chart. It also crossed over to the number four position on the US pop chart. The duo then cut a follow-up release "Forgive Me, John", which reached the US country top five and the US pop top 30. Through 1953, the Husky-Shepard duo toured the United States for a series of shows, making an estimated $300 per gig. Because the legal age was 21 to cross state lines, Husky was appointed as Shepard's guardian.

In 1954, Capitol recorded Shepard twice more. This resulted in four singles, including "Two Whoops and a Holler" and "Please Don't Divorce Me". Husky and Shepard disbanded their duet act the same year. She briefly located to Beaumont, Texas to work with manager Neva Starnes. Throughout the southwestern US, Starnes booked Shepard on road dates with up-and-coming performer George Jones. Around 1955, she joined the cast of the nationally broadcast Ozark Jubilee television show. On one broadcast, she performed a song she had recently heard called "A Satisfied Mind". Nelson was informed of the performance and brought her to California to cut it one week later. In 1955, Capitol rush-released "A Satisfied Mind" as a single. Despite competing versions by Porter Wagoner and Red Foley, Shepard's version reached the number four position on the US country chart and became her first solo commercial success. Its follow-up, "I Thought of You", reached the number ten spot in 1955. Both of the singles' B-sides ("Take Possession" and "Beautiful Lies") made the US country chart. Her back-to-back hits made Shepard one of the first solo female artists to make the US country top ten, along with Kitty Wells.

Shepard's success led to her induction into the cast of the Grand Ole Opry. The induction took place on her birthday in November 1955, and she would remain a member for 60 consecutive years. With her induction, Shepard was one of only four women in the cast: Minnie Pearl, Kitty Wells and pianist Del Wood. In addition, Shepard's commercial success made her one of the first solo female artists in country music to headline shows. Shepard's fame prompted Capitol to issue her first studio album, Songs of a Love Affair, in May 1956. In May 1956, Songs of a Love Affair was released. Considered one of the first country music concept albums, Songs of a Love Affair was a collection of songs that explored the viewpoint of a woman whose spouse was cheating on her By this point, Shepard began to work steadily at the Grand Ole Opry as the cast was expected to make 26 shows per year. At the Opry, Shepard developed a romantic relationship with Hawkshaw Hawkins and the two later married. The pair then started touring together with an ensemble that included horses and Native American performers.

Capitol continued to release new material by Shepard during mid-1950s while still recording in California. However, after realizing she was paying out of pocket for travel. Ken Nelson then began flying to Nashville, Tennessee to produce her beginning in 1957. Despite a regular output of new single releases, Shepard was unable to have commercial success for several years. This was partly due to the influx of rock and roll and the pop-influenced Nashville Sound that overshadowed Shepard's honky tonk sound. One exception was 1958's "I Want to Go Where No One Knows Me", which made the top 20 of the US country chart. In December 1958, Capitol issued her second studio LP Lonesome Love, a concept album of love songs. In 1960, she finished sessions on her third studio LP, Got You on My Mind, which Capitol issued in 1961. Her fourth album Heartaches and Tears was released in 1962. Critics noticed a slight incorporation of the Nashville Sound into these albums, along with her usual honky tonk.

=== 1963–1972: Death of Hawkshaw Hawkins, comeback and leaving Capitol Records ===
In 1963, Hawkshaw Hawkins died in a plane crash, which also took the lives of Patsy Cline, Cowboy Copas and the pilot Randy Hughes. Shepard was eight months pregnant and had a toddler at the time of Hawkins' death. After getting a settlement from the Piper Comanche company (whose airplane was involved in the crash), she debated ending her career. Ultimately, she resumed it after being persuaded by Opry president Jack DeWitt. Shepard returned to the Opry stage several months after the crash. She returned to the recording studio in August 1963. One of the songs recorded following the accident was "Two Little Boys", a tune written for Shepard by Marty Robbins, which described how her children would carry on their father's legacy. "Two Little Boys" was the B-side to her 1964 single "Second Fiddle (To an Old Guitar)". The latter was considered her comeback recording reaching number five on the US country songs chart, becoming her first charting single since 1959. It was nominated for a Grammy award in 1965.

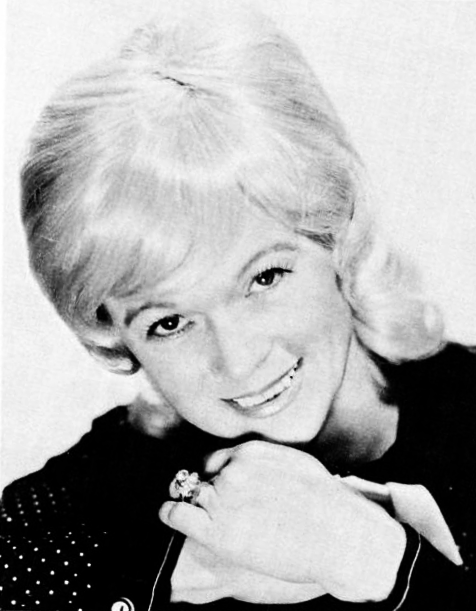
Jean Shepard in a Billboard trade advertisement, 1971.

Under the production of Marvin Hughes, Shepard's next studio album was 1964's Lighthearted and Blue. The collection of cover tunes was her first to make the US Top Country Albums chart, rising to the number 17 position. Following her comeback, Shepard had a series of US charting country songs, including ten that reached the top 40 through 1968. In 1965, both "A Tear Dropped By" and "Someone's Gotta Cry" made top-40 appearances. Her 1966 single "Many Happy Hangovers to You", about a woman telling off an alcoholic husband, reached number 13 on the country chart. Two additional songs reached the country top ten in 1966: "If Teardrops Were Silver" and a duet with Ray Pillow called "I'll Take the Dog". In 1967, both "Heart, We Did All That We Could" and "Your Forevers (Don't Last Very Long)" reached the top 20. All seven singles were included on corresponding studio LPs that made the US country survey. Her highest-peaking LPs were Many Happy Hangovers (1966) and Heart, We Did All That We Could (1967), which both reached number six on the survey. Critics from Billboard and Record World praised Shepard's vocal delivery and highlighted the emotional depth found in her albums of this era.

In 1968, Shepard wed musician Benny Birchfield and started working with new record producers. This included Billy Graves (who recorded her 1968 LP Heart to Heart) and Kelso Herston (who produced "Your Forevers Don't Last Very Long"). Shepard disliked how Herston often came into scheduled sessions drinking and wanted a change in collaborators. She chose Larry Butler, a songwriter and aspiring record producer. Butler met with Herston and got permission to work with Shepard. Her first recordings with Butler were released on the 1969 album Seven Lonely Days. After two years of lower-charting singles, its title track reached number 18 on the US country chart in 1969. It was followed by the number eight hit "Then He Touched Me", whose main character falls in love after giving up hope of finding it. The song, which was included on her 1970 album A Woman's Hand, was nominated for a Grammy. Her subsequent singles through 1971 made the US country top 30: "A Woman's Hand", "I Want You Free" and "With His Hand in Mine". The highest-climbing was the number 12 "Another Lonely Night", whose main character reluctantly chooses to stay with her partner. It was featured on her 1971 studio album Here & Now.

In the early 1970s, Shepard became frustrated with the increasing lack of attention Capitol Records was giving to her music. "I thought I was kinda lost in the shuffle," she later commented. None of her Capitol singles following 1971 rose into the country top 40. Songs like "Safe in These Lovin' Arms of Mine" and "Virginia" only rose into the US country top 70. Furthermore, her studio albums Just as Soon as I Get Over Loving You (1971) and Just Like Walkin' in the Sunshine (1972) failed to make the US country albums survey. In 1972, Ken Nelson released her from her Capitol recording contract. "It was very hard for me. I cried like a baby," she remembered.

=== 1973–1979: Second comeback and traditional country music advocacy ===
In February 1973, Shepard signed with United Artists Records and was given a large amount of money upfront to sign with the label. Despite many Nashville executives believing she was past her prime, Shepard was encouraged by Larry Butler (who was now running the company's country music division) to sign with the label. Her first United Artists single was 1973's "Slippin' Away". Written by Bill Anderson, "Slippin' Away" rose to number four on the US Billboard country chart, number three on Canada's RPM country chart and made a brief appearance on the US Hot 100. "Slippin' Away" became Shepard's highest-charting country single in nine years. It appeared on an album of the same name that went to number 15 on the US country albums survey. The disc's second single "Come on Phone" reached the US and Canadian country top 40.

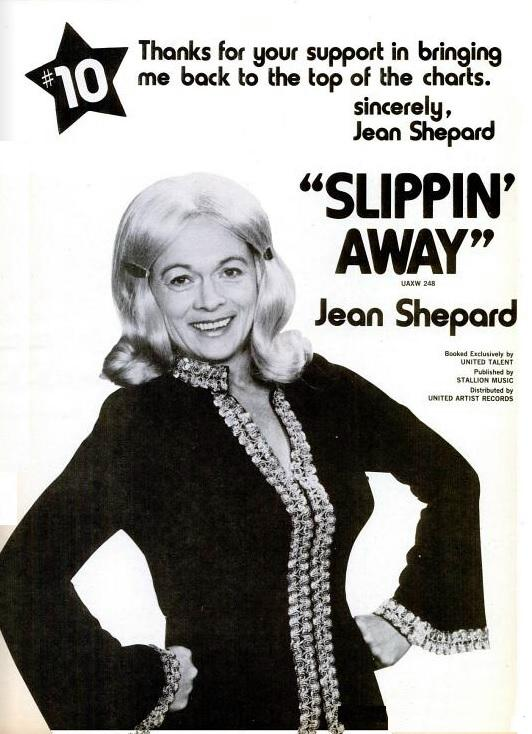
A trade avertisement for Shepard's 1973 comeback single, "Slippin' Away".

Shepard's restored commercial success at age 40 was partly due to Butler's new production that featured upbeat tempos and hand-clapping background effects. Her music's lyrical content also shifted away towards subjects of devotion and romance. Such themes were noticed in her follow-up studio album I'll Do Anything It Takes (1974). The disc reached number 21 on the US country survey. Both of her singles from the album reached the US country top 20 in 1974: "I'll Do Anything It Takes (To Stay with You)" and "At the Time". The latter was also penned by Bill Anderson, who also wrote her next two singles in 1975: "Poor Sweet Baby" and "The Tip of My Fingers". Both songs reached the US country songs top 20 and were featured in Shepard's next studio album, dedicated to Anderson, titled Poor Sweet Baby...And Ten More Bill Anderson Songs. It reached the top 50 of the US country chart.

In 1974, Australian pop singer Olivia Newton-John won the Female Vocalist of the Year trophy on the televised Country Music Association Awards. In response, a group of country artists founded the Association of Country Entertainers (ACE), which advocated for the Country Music Association to promote the genre's traditional formats rather than appealing to crossover styles. Known in the industry for promoting traditional country music, Shepard was encouraged to join the cause and was named the group's president in the 1970s. In her 2014 autobiography, Shepard claimed that she "wasn't ever president", but was instead given all of the responsibility to run it. The ACE failed to have "adequate funding" and ultimately disbanded as a result. According to Shepard, the ACE disbanded because she loaned money from a bank to run a local office. Members failed to keep up with payments and she took collateral on her home, but ultimately she filed for bankruptcy, which led to the ACE ending.

To regain footing following her bankruptcy, Shepard and Benny Birchfield bought a used Toyota and worked the touring circuit. Birchfield, now her manager, helped form her first full-time touring group, The Second Fiddles. The Second Fiddles received equal billing on Shepard's 1975 live album On the Road. During this period, Shepard criticized crossover country on tour and at the Grand Ole Opry, which led disc jockeys to stop playing her songs. Her singles then reached progressively-lower positions. Songs "I'm a Believer (In a Whole Lot of Lovin')" and "Mercy" reached the US country top 50, while "I'm Giving You Denver" and "Hardly a Day Goes By" reached the top 90. Her final United Artists album was Mercy, Ain't Love Good which reached the US country top 40 in 1976. Shepard claimed United Artists "could not keep the wheel rolling", and she attempted to work with a new producer, George Richey. Despite the change, radio backlash and media publicity continued, resulting in United Artists dropping Shepard from their roster. She then signed with the Scorpion label, which released her final charting single, "The Real Thing", in 1978. She remained with Scorpion through 1979, and she signed a contract the same year with a new booking agency called Atlas Artist Bureau, Inc.

=== 1980–2015: Continued touring, sporadic recordings and the Grand Ole Opry ===
Finished with commercial country radio, Shepard continued touring and performing over the next several decades. Her music grew particularly popular in Europe, specifically in the United Kingdom where she performed frequently. One of her 1980s European engagements was the National Pure Country Music Tour in 1980 alongside Boxcar Willie. Other countries Shepard played included Ireland, Germany, Austria and Sweden.

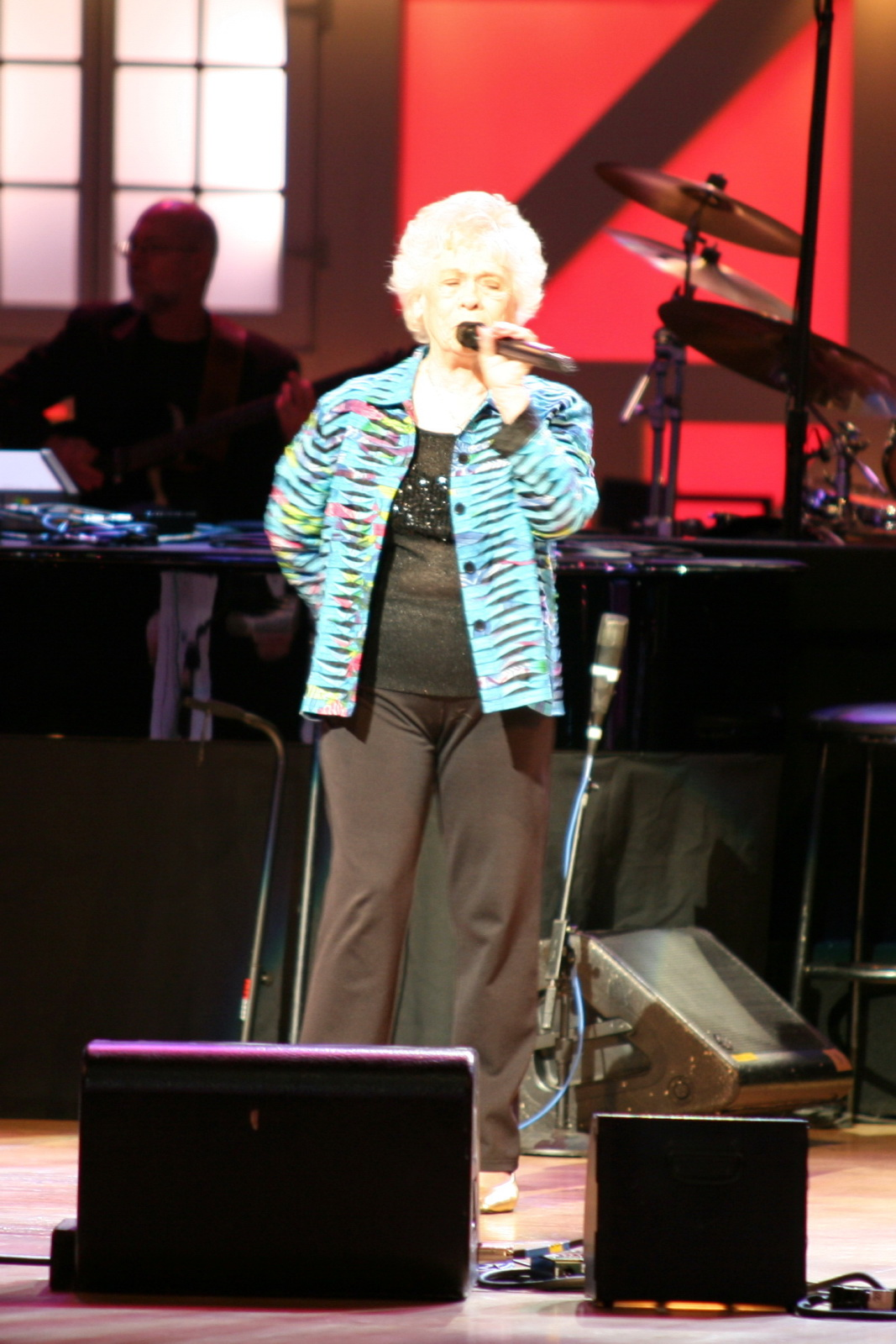
Shepard in mid-performance, 2007.

In 1981, Shepard was among several Grand Ole Opry members to record a studio album under the title Stars of the Grand Ole Opry. Released by the First Generation label, Shepard's album consisted of re-recordings and some new material. Billboard critics found Shepard's performance on the album to be traditional compared to her earlier recordings. In 1985, she collaborated with Roy Drusky on the studio album Together at Last. Released on the Round Robin label, the project featured both duets and solo recordings by the pairing. During the second half of the 1980s, Shepard advocated and fundraised for Vietnam veterans. Shepard often raised veteran's funds by playing shows, which sometimes were shut down by the Veteran's Administration because she did not receive permission to sponsor soldiers. She continued advocating for traditional country music as well, criticizing James Brown's 1988 Grand Ole Opry performance.

In 1991, the Country Harvest label released Shepard's second studio album of re-recordings, titled Slippin' Away. Labels began reissuing Shepard's 1950s Capitol material, beginning with 1995's Honky Tonk Heroine: Classic Capitol Recordings. Released on compact disc by the Country Music Foundation, the compilation also featured a biography and more details about the recordings in the liner notes. Shepard started appearing in filmed performances titled Country's Family Reunion during the 1990s. Originally airing on the TNN network, the program eventually was released in a video format available for purchase. In 2000, the Ernest Tubb Record Shop issued a new studio album by Shepard called The Tennessee Waltz. The album featured covers, along with new material. The Raney label then released Shepard's next album called Precious Memories (2003), a collection of gospel songs.

Along with Jan Howard, Jeanne Pruett, and Jeannie Seely, she was named one of the "Grand Ladies of the Grand Ole Opry" for her dedication to the venue. She served as a spokesperson for the Springer Mountain Farms chicken company in the 2000s. Shepard's autobiography, Down Through the Years was published in 2014, after fifteen years of planning. The book recounted the personal and professional memories of her life. On November 21, 2015, Shepard became the first woman to be a member of the Grand Ole Opry for 60 consecutive years—a feat that only one other person had achieved at the time (founding member Herman Crook of the Crook Brothers). She retired from the stage the same night.

== Personal life ==
=== Marriages ===
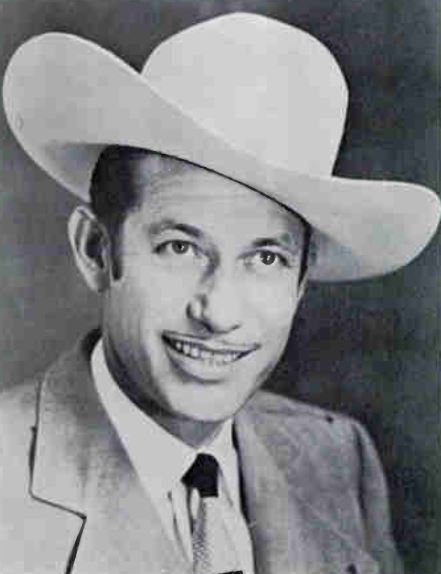
Shepard was married to fellow country artist Hawkshaw Hawkins who died in a plane crash in 1963

Shepard was briefly married in 1951, to someone she identified in her autobiography only as Freddie. She met him through Melody Ranch Girls member Dixie Gardener after Freddie was discharged from the Navy. The pair began dating, he proposed, and they wed shortly after she turned 18, though she had second thoughts about the marriage. According to Shepard, Freddie disliked the idea of his wife having her own career and attempted to end her first recording contract with Capitol Records. "He wanted to get me back to Tennessee where he was from and keep me barefoot and pregnant," she told liner-notes author Chris Skinker. Shepard also stated that Freddie had violent tendencies and had threatened her life on several occasions. After one altercation, she moved out of the couple's California apartment and returned to her parents' home. Shortly afterward, Shepard and her mother went before a court judge who granted her an annulment.

Shepard met Hawkshaw Hawkins after joining the Grand Ole Opry Cast in 1955. After leaving the cast she moved to Nashville, Tennessee, where she re-encountered and befriended Hawkins. The pair started a romantic relationship following Hawkins's divorce in 1958. Inspired by Hank Williams's wedding, Shepard and Hawkins married on November 26, 1960, while onstage at a concert in Wichita, Kansas. In attendance was Ken Nelson (who gave Shepard away); Hawkins's secretary Lucille Coates and a local disc jockey broadcast the wedding over the radio. Shepard gave birth to the couple's first child, Don Robin, in 1961. He was named for the couple's friends, Don Gibson and Marty Robbins. The couple toured together for the majority of their marriage. When at home, they often spent time hunting and fishing. Hawkins and Shepard lived on a three-acre home in Goodlettsville, Tennessee, that included a horse stable.

On March 5, 1963, while Shepard was pregnant with the couple's second child, Hawkins was traveling home to Nashville on an airplane with Patsy Cline, Cowboy Copas, and pilot Randy Hughes. Shepard experienced dizziness and sharp pain before going to sleep that night, which she later associated with the timing of the plane crash. At 11:00 PM, she was awakened by a phone call from a friend who informed her that Hawkins' plane crashed. Her doctor had to sedate her so she could rest, and a highway patrol officer was stationed at her home. Several friends, including Minnie Pearl, stayed by Shepard's bedside that evening. At 6:00 AM, Hawkins's plane was found near Camden, Tennessee. During her life, Shepard would criticize the way Patsy Cline's death in the crash overshadowed Hawkins' and others. "A lot of people think during this time that I've hated Patsy Cline, and that's not the story at all. I resented the way it was presented, like she was the only person on that airplane," she told The Tennessean in 2013.

Following Hawkins' death, Shepard's parents stayed with her to attend to domestic duties and look after her when she gave birth to Harold Franklin Hawkins II the next month. Shortly afterward, she sold his quarter horses. After one was stolen from her property, she called the police, and detective Archie Summers was sent to investigate the situation. Summers and Shepard began a romantic relationship shortly afterward and married in 1966. Shortly after marrying, she discovered that Summers was an alcoholic but tried to keep the marriage together so her children could have a father figure. When Summers appeared at one of her concerts drunk, Shepard decided to end their marriage, and they divorced in 1968.

Shepard's final marriage was to musician Benny Birchfield, and they remained together until her death in 2016. The pair first met at the 1966 Nashville Disc Jockey convention, where Birchfield played in the Osborne Brothers' touring band. Birchfield left the Osborne Brothers to play in Shepard's road band. They developed a romantic relationship on the road, and they wed on November 21, 1968. Shepard gave birth to the couple's only child together, Corey, on December 23, 1969. Birchfield also brought six of his children into the marriage. The couple eventually had 25 grandchildren and five great-grandchildren. The family lived for a time in Gallatin, Tennessee in a home that cost 250,000 dollars. Birchfield served as Shepard's manager following their marriage. During this period, Birchfield also worked as Roy Orbison's bus driver and band member. Orbison often spent time at the couple's home in Nashville, and he visited them several hours before his death in 1988.

=== Death ===
In the 2010s, Shepard experienced trouble walking and became immobile, relying on a wheelchair. After going to several doctors, it was discovered she had a brain deficiency. By 2013, it was treated, and she resumed walking. She was later diagnosed with Parkinson's disease and became increasingly debilitated by the illness. Shepard entered hospice care in September 2016 and died on September 25 in Gallatin, Tennessee due from complications of Parkinson's and heart disease. She was 82 years old. At the time of her death, she was the longest-running living member of the Opry. A public funeral was held in Hendersonville, Tennessee on September 29. Following Shepard's death, her granddaughter died after being stabbed by her boyfriend, whom Birchfield shot and killed in self-defense. An investigation found that Hawkins's boyfriend had stabbed her to death and that Birchfield acted in self-defense, dismissing him from being charged with crimes.

== Artistry ==
=== Vocals ===
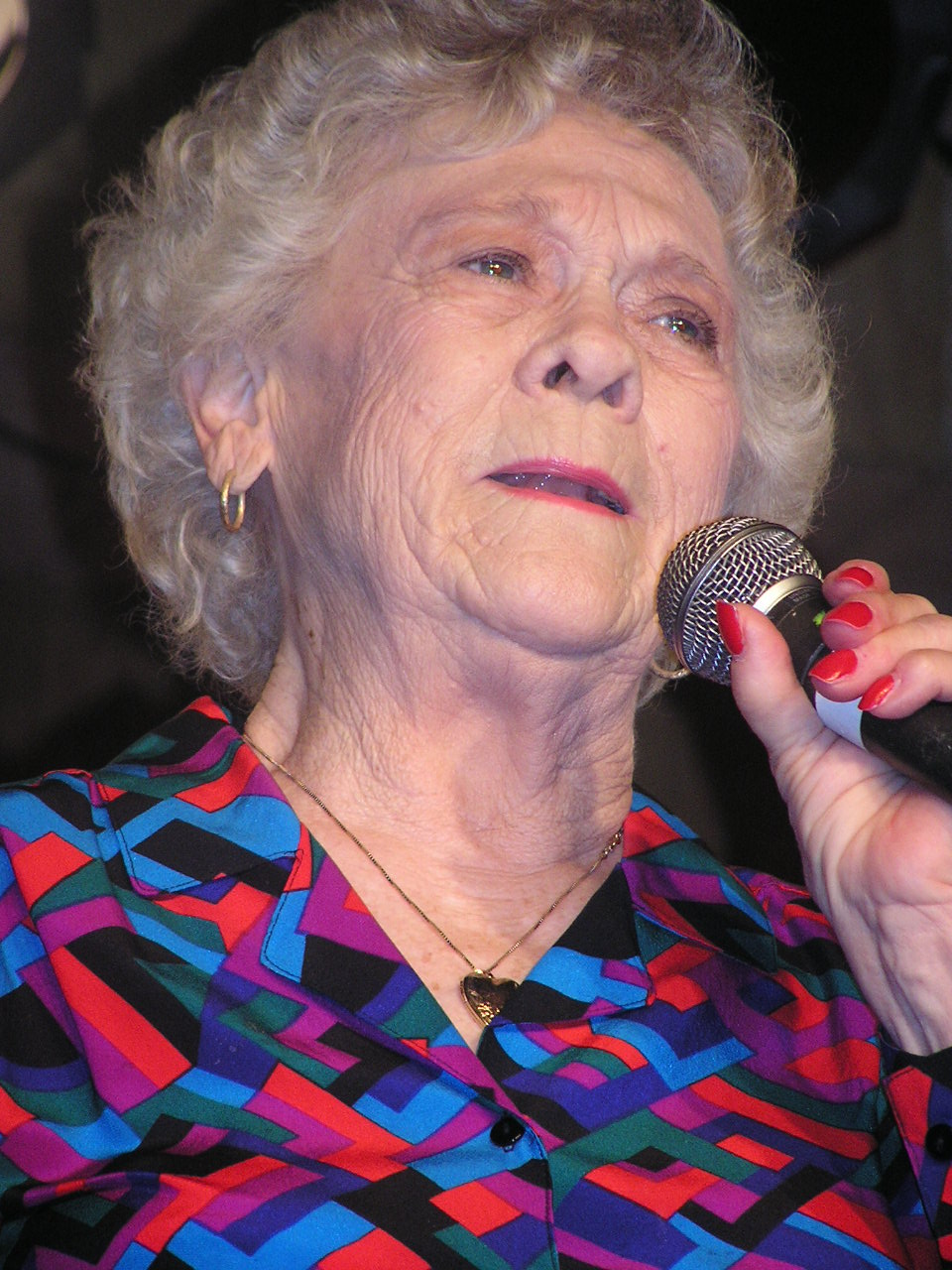
Shepard performing at a benefit event, 2006

Shepard's vocals have been described by music writers as having a raw and assertive sound that paired well with honky tonk music. Author Kurt Wolff described her singing style as "hardcore" and further wrote, "She had a firm voice, one that could growl as well as yelp, yodel and cry." Edd Hurt of the Nashville Scene wrote, "Shepard stayed in control, but her voice gave body to songs that often explored the limits of what women could endure." William Grimes of The New York Times said that she had a "female country voice with muscle and ambition". Shepard often yodeled during live performances and occasionally on recordings. Her yodeling was featured in the final section of her 1964 single "Second Fiddle (To an Old Guitar)" Shepard credited Jimmie Rodgers records with teaching her how to yodel.

=== Musical styles and lyrical themes ===
Shepard was solely identified with the country genre throughout her career, specifically with traditional country. Her recordings were often categorized into the honky tonk sub-genre, which pointed to themes of infidelity, alcohol, romance and relationships ending. Critics referred to her Capitol recordings for displaying honky tonk themes and found them to be the most memorable by female artists. Dan Cooper of AllMusic wrote, "She cut one great record after another, mostly on Capitol Records. Nearly all of them crackle, no matter the topic, with honky tonk angel spirit." Mary A. Bufwack and Robert K. Oermann stated, "In the final roll call of the great female honky-tonk tunes are scores of Jean Shepard performances."

Many of her 1950s and 1960s honky-tonk recordings portrayed women in assertive roles, which predated the 1960s feminist movement. William Grimes highlighted the songs "The Root of All Evil (Is a Man)" and "Many Happy Hangovers to You" for "planting the flag for independent women". Kurt Wolff named "Don't Fall in Love with a Married Man" and "Sad Singin' and Slow Ridin" to be "proto-feminist and downright bold". Author Peter La Chapelle wrote that she "not only sang pithy honky tonk numbers that bemoaned the behavior of the honky-tonk man, but even suggested that through collective action women could uproot the very foundations of the patriarchy".

Shepard's 1950s Capitol recordings were part of the Bakersfield Sound, a country sub-genre originating on the American west coast. Her 1950s California recording sessions featured session musicians like Jimmy Bryant, Roy Harte, Fuzzy Owen, Buck Owens, Cliffie Stone, Lewis Talley and Speedy West. Many of these musicians later had careers of their own and worked alongside other west country performers such as Merle Haggard. Writers and historians considered 1953's "A Dear John Letter" to be the first commercially successful recording to consist entirely of Bakersfield musicians.

When the Nashville Sound musical style ushered in pop-inspired trends, Shepard mostly kept her traditional sound but at times experimented with softer pop elements. Chris Skinker of The Melody Ranch Girl box set noted that, by 1961, "the Nashville Sound was starting to creep into Jean's recordings", pointing to the "ethereal, echoey sound" of the guitar and the harmony vocals on specific songs. As her career progressed, Shepard's song choices explored more contemporary themes of loyalty and faithfulness. Other songs discussed sexuality, such as 1974's "Poor Sweet Baby", which describes a woman and a man about to have intercourse, and 1975's "Another Neon Night", in which Shepard's character is involved in a one-night stand.

== Legacy, influence and achievements ==
Music writers, historians and journalists have noted that Jean Shepard was among country music's first commercially successful female artists. Along with Kitty Wells and Minnie Pearl, Shepard sustained success in the male-dominated country music industry during the 1950s. Peter Cooper of the Country Music Hall of Fame and Museum wrote, "During the 1950s, few women managed to break through industry barriers to enjoy full-blown country careers, but Jean Shepard did just that." Ken Burns of the PBS documentary Country Music wrote, "In the 1950s, self-supporting female country artists were rare. Women who rose to stardom on the West Coast rather than through the Grand Ole Opry were rarer still, as were women who adopted a hard-edged honky-tonk style or sang from a woman's perspective. Jean Shepard was all that and more." Mary A. Bufwack and Robert K. Oermann said, "Jean Shepard's achievement is all the more remarkable because she was the only early-1950s country music woman who made it on her own."

Shepard's success in the 1950s influenced the careers of female artists in the 1960s like Loretta Lynn, Tammy Wynette and Dolly Parton. Other female country singers have since considered Shepard an influence, including Elizabeth Cook, Reba McEntire, Jeannie Seely and Connie Smith. Some writers have said Shepard did not get the credit she deserved. Bobbie Jean Sawyer of the Wide Open Country wrote, "Jean Shepard has never gotten her due recognition for opening doors for women in country music. But it's not too late to change that."

In 2010, Shepard was inducted into the Oklahoma Music Hall of Fame, her home state. In 2011, Shepard was inducted into the Country Music Hall of Fame along with Bobby Braddock and Reba McEntire. Blake Farmer of NPR reported that many people believed her future membership into the Country Hall of Fame was "overdue". Shepard believed for many years the Country Hall of Fame ignored her early efforts. "In my case, they were about 20 years overdue. I just at some point decided they'd forgotten about me, and I forgot about them," she wrote in her autobiography.

== Discography ==
Studio albums

- Songs of a Love Affair (1956)
- Lonesome Love (1958)
- Got You on My Mind (1961)
- Heartaches and Tears (1962)
- Lighthearted and Blue (1964)
- It's a Man Every Time (1965)
- Many Happy Hangovers (1966)
- I'll Take the Dog (with Ray Pillow) (1966)
- Heart, We Did All That We Could (1967)
- Your Forevers Don't Last Very Long (1967)
- Heart to Heart (1968)
- A Real Good Woman (1968)
- I'll Fly Away (1969)
- Seven Lonely Days (1969)
- Best by Request (1970)
- A Woman's Hand (1970)
- Here & Now (1971)
- Just as Soon as I Get Over Loving You (1971)
- Just Like Walkin' in the Sunshine (1972)
- Slippin' Away (1973)
- I'll Do Anything It Takes (1974)
- Poor Sweet Baby...And Ten More Bill Anderson Songs (1975)
- I'm a Believer (1975)
- Mercy, Ain't Love Good (1976)
- Stars of the Grand Ole Opry (1981)
- Together at Last (with Roy Drusky) (1985)
- Slippin' Away (re-recordings) (1993)
- The Tennessee Waltz (2000)
- Precious Memories (2000)

== Books ==
- Down Through the Years (2014)

== Awards and nominations ==
Year	Nominee / work	Award	Result	Ref.
1953	Cash Box	Best Country and Western Artist of 1953	Nominated	
1953	Cash Box	Most Promising New Country and Western Vocalist of 1953	Won	
1955	Cash Box	Best Female Country Vocalist of 1955	Nominated	
1955	Cash Box	Best Country Record of 1955 – "A Satisfied Mind"	Nominated	
1956	Cash Box	Best Female Vocalist	Nominated	
1956	Cash Box	Best Country Record – "Beautiful Lies"	Nominated	
1957	Cash Box	Best Female Vocalist	Nominated	
1958	Billboard	Favorite Female Artists of C&W Disc Jockeys	Nominated	
1959	Cash Box	Best Country Female Vocalist of 1959	Won	
1962	Billboard	Favorite Female Artists of Country Music	Nominated	
1962	Cash Box	Best Female Vocalist	Nominated	
1963	Billboard	Favorite Female Country Artist	Nominated	
1964	Cash Box	Best Female Vocalist	Nominated	
1965	8th Annual Grammy Awards	Best Country Vocal Performance, Female – "Second Fiddle (To an Old Guitar)"	Nominated	
1966	Cashbox	Top Female Vocalist – Albums and Singles	Nominated	
1967	Cashbox	Top Female Vocalist – Singles	Nominated	
1967	Billboard	Top Female Vocalist	Nominated	
1968	Billboard	Top Female Vocalist – Singles	Nominated	
1970	Billboard	Top Female Vocalist – Singles	Nominated	
1971	Billboard	Top Female Vocalist – Singles	Nominated	
1971	13th Annual Grammy Awards	Best Country Vocal Performance, Female – "Then He Touched Me"	Nominated	
1973	Billboard	Top Female Vocalist – Singles	Nominated	
1973	Billboard	Female Artist Resurgence of the Year	Won	
1975	Billboard	Top Female Vocalist – Singles	Nominated	
1976	Billboard	Top Female Vocalist – Singles	Nominated	
2010	Oklahoma Music Hall of Fame	Induction	Inducted	
2011	Country Music Hall of Fame	Induction	Inducted	
