= The World Needs a Melody (song) =

Song by The Carter Family with Johnny Cash

Single by The Carter Family with Johnny Cash

from the album Travelin' Minstrel Band
- B-side: "A Bird with Broken Wings Can't Fly"
- Released: August 1972
- Genre: Country
- Label: Columbia 4-45679
- Songwriters: Red Lane, Johnny Slate, Larry Henley
- Producer: Larry Butler

"The World Needs a Melody" is a song written by Red Lane, Johnny Slate and Larry Henley and originally recorded by The Carter Family together with Johnny Cash. It is part of the 1972 Carter Family album Travelin' Minstrel Band.

Released in August 1972 as a single (Columbia 4-45679, with "A Bird with Broken Wings Can't Fly" by The Carter Family on the opposite side), the song reached number 35 on U.S. Billboard's country chart for the week of November 4.

== Track listing ==
7" single (Columbia 4-45679, 1972)
No.	Title	Writer(s)	Length
1.	"The World Needs a Melody"	R. Lane, J. Slate, L. Henley	3:16
2.	"A Bird with Broken Wings Can't Fly"	B. Williams	2:53

== Charts ==
Chart (1972)	Peak position
US Hot Country Songs (Billboard)	35

== Cover versions ==
- 1973: The New Kingston Trio on the album The World Needs a Melody
