= At the Time =

Single by Jean Shepard

from the album I'll Do Anything It Takes
- B-side: "Love Came Pouring Down"
- Released: February 1974
- Recorded: 1973
- Genre: Country
- Length: 2:32
- Label: United Artists
- Songwriter: Bill Anderson
- Producer: Larry Butler

Jean Shepard singles chronology
"Come on Phone" (1973)	"At the Time" (1974)	"I'll Do Anything It Takes (To Stay with You)" (1974)

"At the Time" is a song written by Bill Anderson that was recorded by American country singer Jean Shepard. Released as a single by United Artists Records, it reached the top 20 of the US country chart in 1974. It was the second single written by Anderson that Shepard recorded. It was given positive reviews from magazines and books following its release.

== Background, content and recording ==
Jean Shepard was one of the country genre's first female singers to have commercial success. She had more than 20 years of commercial popularity, mostly with Capitol Records before moving to United Artists in the 1970s. At the label, she had a comeback at age 40 with "Slippin' Away". The top ten single was written by Bill Anderson, and he promised to write more material, including Shepard's next single release. The single, "At the Time", was described as an up-tempo tune that compared working class references to upper class references to lure a lover. "At the Time" was recorded in 1973 by producer Larry Butler.

== Release, critical reception and chart performance ==
"At the Time" was released by United Artists Records in February 1974. It was distributed as a seven-inch vinyl single and included a B-side, "Love Came Pouring Down". The song was given a positive review from Billboard magazine, who found it to have "very clever lyrics" and praised Shepard's vocal performance. Writers Mary A. Bufwack and Robert K. Oermann had similar findings, calling the lyrics "enormously clever". "At the Time" reached the top 20 of the US Billboard Hot Country Songs chart, rising to the number 13 position in 1974. It was Shepard's second top 20 record on the US country chart with her new record label. On Canada's RPM Country Tracks chart, the song climbed to the number 24 position. It was Shepard's seventh charting single in Canada. It was the lead single for her 1974 studio album I'll Do Anything It Takes.

== Track listings ==
7" vinyl single

- "At the Time" – 2:32
- "Love Came Pouring Down" – 2:12

== Charts ==
Weekly chart performance for "At the Time"
Chart (1974)	Peak position
Canada Country Tracks (RPM)	24
US Hot Country Songs (Billboard)	13
