= Praise the Lord and Pass the Soup =

Song by Johnny Cash with The Carter Family and The Oak Ridge Boys

Single by Johnny Cash (with The Carter Family and The Oak Ridge Boys)
- B-side: "The Ballad of Barbara"
- Released: 1973
- Genre: Country
- Label: Columbia 4-45890
- Songwriters: Albert Hammond, Michael Hazlewood
- Producer: Albert Hammond

Music video
- "Praise the Lord and Pass the Soup" on YouTube

"Praise the Lord and Pass the Soup" is a song written by Albert Hammond and Michael Hazlewood and originally recorded by Johnny Cash with The Carter Family and The Oak Ridge Boys.

Released in 1973 as a single (Columbia 4-45890, with "The Ballad of Barbara" on the opposite side), the song reached number 57 on U.S. Billboard's country chart for the week of November 4.

== Track listing ==
7" single (Columbia 4-45890, 1973)
| No. | Title | Writer(s) | Length |
|---|---|---|---|
| 1. | "The World Needs a Melody" | A. Hammond, M. Hazlewood | 3:50 |
| 2. | "The Ballad of Barbara" | J. Cash | 4:05 |

== Charts ==
| Chart (1973) | Peak position |
|---|---|
| US Hot Country Songs (Billboard) | 57 |
