= The Carter Sisters =

American folk music vocal quartet

The Carter Sisters, (also known as the second version of The Carter Family) were an American band consisting of Maybelle Carter and her daughters June Carter Cash, Helen Carter, and Anita Carter. Each played an instrument, with June being a pioneer as a front-man. Formed during World War II, the group recorded and performed into the 1990s. Maybelle and Ezra named the band "The Carter Sisters and Mother Maybelle" and recorded under that title for 2 record labels RCA and Columbia. Maybelle wanted her daughters to be the face of the band.

== History ==
In the 1920s through the early 1940s, Maybelle Carter was part of the historic country music trio The Carter Family with her cousin Sara Carter and Sara's husband A. P. Carter. Maybelle's contribution to the group was singing harmony to Sara's lead vocal as well as playing guitar, lead and rhythm at the same time. Maybelle was married to A.P.'s brother Ezra Carter and had three daughters: June, Helen, and Anita.

In March 1943, when the original Carter Family trio stopped recording together after their WBT-AM contract ended, Maybelle Carter formed "The Carter Sisters and Mother Maybelle" with her three daughters, who had frequently appeared with The Carter Family on their radio broadcasts of the late 1930s. When this new act began, June was 14, Helen was 16, and Anita was 10. Like any mother would, Maybelle wanted her daughters to be the face of the group as they were young but growing. Their band would record under the title "The Carter Sisters and Mother Maybelle" starting in 1949 on the RCA label and starting in 1952 on the Columbia label.

The group was said to have been a mix of traditional songs of the original Carter Family with pop, gospel, and vaudeville comedy. Each daughter made her own contribution to the band.

- Helen: vocals, guitar, and accordion
- Anita: vocals, guitar, and bass fiddle
- June: vocals, autoharp, guitar, banjo, dance, and comedy (she could carry a tune but struggled with pitch problems and soon began to focus more on her comedic addition to the group.)

The group (originally from Poor Valley, Virginia) made their first move to Richmond, Virginia in 1943. (They were reported as having kept their travel low key, with their father Ezra driving the group in a van to and from their destinations.) The new group first aired on radio station WRNL in Richmond on June 1, 1943. This broadcast would serve as their first commercially sponsored program and their first radio debut as "The Carter Sisters and Mother Maybelle." The girls' next big break was offered to them by "Sunshine Sue" of WRVA-AM. In September 1946 the group was asked to be a part of The Old Dominion Barn Dance on WRVA. The show had just begun and started small; however, by the end of its first year, it was selling out its 1,400-seat theater twice a night, every Saturday. The group soon became a headliner for the show. Having spent five years in Richmond, the girls were yet again offered a job opportunity, this time in Knoxville, Tennessee.

In 1948, towards the end of their time in Richmond, the girls were offered the chance to work for WNOX-AM in Knoxville. They accepted and were then played on both the evening show, Tennessee Barn Dance; and the daily show, Mid-Day Merry-Go-Round. In Knoxville, they met and began working with guitarist, Chet Atkins.

Now known as The Carter Sisters and Mother Maybelle with Chet Atkins, the group released its first record on February 2, 1949, produced in Atlanta, Georgia through RCA Victor Records. The group recorded many singles in the 1950s. The sisters also individually released occasional single records but none of their recordings in this era were particularly successful, despite their fame and popularity as a concert act.

Offered a radio show at Springfield, Missouri's KWTO, the group, along with Atkins left Knoxville. They worked as a popular addition at KWTO in 1949 and 1950.

In June 1950 the group was offered a job at the Grand Ole Opry in Nashville, Tennessee. They accepted and their performances became some of their most famous and valued work. They performed with famous names such as Elvis Presley, Carl Smith (June's husband at the time), Ernest Tubb, and Johnny Cash and spent roughly ten years working the Grand Ole Opry as well as on various other radio broadcasts. They became members of the Opry in the early 1950s. June also began making frequent solo performances in concert and on television during this era.

After A.P. Carter's death in 1960, Maybelle officially renamed the girls' group "The Carter Family" after the original act. In 1963 The Carter Family began working as part of the Johnny Cash road show. During this period, all four members of the group occasionally recorded as solo artists. June and Helen released a number of singles; Anita had several chart records and hit duets with both Hank Snow on "Bluebird Island" and with Waylon Jennings on "I Got You". She and Snow released an album of duets on RCA Records. June would later have a solo hit in 1971 with "A Good Man." She and Cash eventually began a relationship (initially extramarital); both divorced their spouses in 1966 and married in 1968) and went on to record several hits with him. Maybelle Carter recorded a number of solo albums, mostly instrumental performances, and in 1967 reunited with Sara Carter for an album of old-timey music titled "Historic Reunion."

The act continued and actually enjoyed its greatest success in the early 1970s. June's marriage to Cash brought the Carter Sisters regular appearances on television's The Johnny Cash Show and the first major chart hit records of their career. In 1973, the act won "Favorite Country Vocal Group" on the American Music Awards, a surprise victory over the more commercially successful The Statler Brothers (another group closely associated with Cash) and The Osborne Brothers. Each of the sisters released LPs on various record labels as well as recording several albums of music as a group.

The second edition of The Carter Family released their last record, the 1977 single "Papa's Sugar" a year before Mother Maybelle's death. Helen and Anita continued to appear as part of The Johnny Cash Show. In the mid and late 1980s, Anita, Helen, and their children briefly recorded as The Carter Family for Audiograph Records and later Mercury Records. June did not participate in these recordings although she remained close to her sisters. In the 1990s Anita's health issues limited her appearances with her sisters and she occasionally was replaced on some concert appearances by June's daughter Rosey.

In 1989 The Carter Sisters joined The Nitty Gritty Dirt Band for the recording of their Country Music Association's Album of the Year, the follow-up Will the Circle Be Unbroken, Vol. 2. In 1990, the album was celebrated on the PBS music television program Austin City Limits, which featured a performance by The Carter Sisters of "Keep on the Sunny Side" and with the full ensemble on the Carter Family song, "Will The Circle Be Unbroken", from the original 1972 album.

== Discography ==
=== Albums ===
Year	Album	US Country	Label
1963	Country Favorites		Sunset Records
1964	Keep on the Sunny Side		Columbia Records
1965	The Best of the Carter Family		Columbia Records
1967	Country Album		Columbia Records
1970	I Walk The Line (reissues)		Harmony Records
1972	Travelin' Minstrel Band	44	Columbia Records
1974	Three Generations		Columbia Records
1976	Country's First Family	49	Columbia Records
1982	Class Family of Country (reissues)		Columbia Special Products

The Carter Family receives special billing on the cover for their background vocals on Merle Haggard's 1971 album The Land of Many Churches.

=== Selected singles ===
Year	Single	Chart Positions		Album
Year	Single	US Country	CAN Country	Album
1949	"Why Do You Weep, Dear Willow"	—	—	singles only
1949	"Walk Closer to Me"	—	—	singles only
1950	"Little Orphan Girl"	—	—	singles only
1953	"Wildwood Flower"	—	—	singles only
1954	"Time's a Wastin'"	—	—	singles only
1954	"You are My Flower"	—	—	singles only
1964	"Fair and Tender Ladies"	—	—	singles only
1965	"You Win Again"	—	—	singles only
1966	"I Walk the Line"	—	—	Country Album
1967	"Once Around the Briar Patch"	—	—	Country Album
1969	"If I Live Long Enough"	—	—	singles only
1971	"A Song to Mama"	37	42	Travelin' Minstrel Band
1972	"Travelin' Minstrel Band"	42	—	Travelin' Minstrel Band
1972	"The World Needs a Melody" (with Johnny Cash)	35	55	Travelin' Minstrel Band
1973	"Praise the Lord and Pass the Soup" (with Johnny Cash & The Oak Ridge Boys)	57	65	singles only
1973	"Pick the Wildwood Flower" (with Johnny Cash)	34	—	singles only

=== Guest singles ===
Year	Single	Artist	US Country	Album
1963	"Busted"	Johnny Cash	13	Blood, Sweat and Tears

Johnny Cash With Carter Family, The - The Three Bells (7", Promo) Columbia 38-04740 1984
