= A Song to Mama =

Song by The Carter Family

Single by The Carter Family

from the album Travelin' Minstrel Band
- B-side: "One More Summer in Virginia"
- Released: July 1971
- Genre: Country
- Label: Columbia 4-45428
- Songwriters: June Carter, Helen Carter, George Jones
- Producer: Billy Sherrill

"A Song to Mama" is a song written by June Carter Cash, Helen Carter and George Jones and originally recorded by The Carter Family, with the uncredited participation of Johnny Cash.

The song is a tribute to Maybelle Carter.

Released in July 1971 as a single (Columbia 4-45758, with "One More Summer in Virginia" on the opposite side), the song reached number 37 on U.S. Billboard's country chart for the week of October 9.

The song was later included as the opening track on The Carter Family album Travelin' Minstrel Band (1972).

== Track listing ==
7" single (Columbia 4-45428, 1971)
No.	Title	Writer(s)	Length
1.	"A Song to Mama"	J. C. Cash, H. Carter, G. Jones	2:36
2.	"One More Summer in Virginia"	D. Reid	2:51

7" single (CBS 8151, 1972, Netherlands)
No.	Title	Writer(s)	Length
1.	"A Song to Mama"	J. C. Cash, H. Carter, G. Jones	2:36
2.	"Never Ending Song of Love"	D. Bramlett	2:48

== Charts ==
Chart (1971)	Peak position
US Hot Country Songs (Billboard)	37
