= Got You on My Mind (song) =

"Got You on My Mind" is a song written by Howard Biggs and Joe Thomas. The lyrics commence: "Got you on my mind feeling kinda sad and low / Wonderin' where you are / wonderin' why you had to go / Tears began to fall ev'rytime I hear your name." The song was recorded by John Greer and the Rhythm Rockers 1951, for whom it was a hit, and then covered by Hawkshaw Hawkins 1952, The Big Three Trio 1952, Buddy Morrow and His Orchestra 1952, Jim Reeves early 1950s, Varetta Dillard 1956, The Del Royals 1961, Cookie and his Cupcakes 1963, Jerry Lee Lewis 1965, Carl Hall 1966, Sleepy LaBeef 1970, David Allan Coe 1973, Price Mitchell & Jerri Kelly 1974, Carol Channing & Webb Pierce 1977, Eric Clapton 2001, and by Dale Sellers. The song was also the title track on albums of the same title by Jean Shephard 1961 and William Galison and Madeleine Peyroux (2004).
