= I Want to Go Where No One Knows Me =

Single by Jean Shepard
- B-side: "Just Another Girl"
- Released: October 1958
- Recorded: November 6, 1956
- Studio: Capitol Studios
- Genre: Country
- Length: 2:35
- Label: Capitol
- Songwriter(s): Jerry Jerico; Ken Grant
- Producer(s): Ken Nelson

Jean Shepard singles chronology
"He's My Baby" (1958)	"I Want to Go Where No One Knows Me" (1958)	"Have Heart, Will Love" (1959)

"I Want to Go Where No One Knows Me" is a song written by Kenneth Grant and Jerry Jericho. It was originally recorded by American country singer Jean Shepard. Released as a single in 1958, it reached the top 20 of the US country chart.

== Background and recording ==
In the 1950s, Jean Shepard was one of only a few women to break through the male-dominated country music field. During this period, she had top ten singles with "A Satisfied Mind", "Beautiful Lies" and "I Thought of You". Among her charting singles during the decade was 1958's "I Want to Go Where No One Knows Me". The track was composed by Jerry Jericho and Ken Grant. The song had actually been recorded two years earlier on November 6, 1956. The session was produced by Ken Nelson at Capitol Studios in Hollywood, California. Three additional sides were cut at the same session.

== Release and chart performance ==
"I Want to Go Where No One Knows Me" was released in October 1956 by Capitol Records. It was distributed as a seven-inch vinyl single. The disc included a B-side titled "Just Another Girl" (composed by Harlan Howard). The song made its debut on the US Billboard country songs chart on December 22, 1958. It reached the top 20 of the chart, rising to the number 18 position. "I Want to Go Where No One Knows Me" was only one of two charting singles Shepard had on the US country chart in the second half of the 1950s. The second would be the next release "Have Heart Will Love".

== Track listing ==
7" vinyl single

- "I I Want to Go Where No One Knows Me" – 2:35
- "Just Another Girl" – 2:21

== Charts ==
Weekly chart performance for "I Want to Go Where No One Knows Me"
Chart (1958)	Peak position
US Hot Country Songs (Billboard)	18
