= Got You on My Mind (Jean Shepard album) =

Album by Jean Shepard

Studio album by Jean Shepard
- Released: March 1961
- Recorded: April 1960
- Studio: Bradley Studios (Nashville, Tennessee)
- Genre: Country; Honky-tonk; pop
- Label: Capitol
- Producer: Ken Nelson

Jean Shepard chronology
Lonesome Love (1958)	Got You on My Mind (1961)	Heartaches and Tears (1962)

Got You on My Mind is a studio album by American country artist Jean Shepard. It was released in March 1961 by Capitol Records and was a collection of 12 tracks. The album featured all cover tunes with Shepard at times harmonizing with herself on the recordings. It was Shepard's third studio album in her career. It was met with positive reception from critics following its release.

== Background, recording and content ==
Jean Shepard first found success in the 1950s recording a series of Honky-tonk songs, beginning with "A Dear John Letter" (1953). She continued recording the musical style as country pop became more popular during the late 1950s and early 1960s. Between 1959 and 1964, Shepard was unable to have continued success due to this factor. Yet, her label continued releasing material including her fourth studio album Got You on My Mind. The album was recorded in April 1958 at the Bradley Film and Recording Studio in Nashville, Tennessee. The project was produced by Ken Nelson. Session musicians featured The Nashville A-Team, which Shepard had recently started utilizing. A total of 12 tracks comprised Got You on My Mind. The album consisted of all cover tunes with Shepard often heard harmonizing with herself on various tracks.

== Release and reception ==
Professional ratings
Review scores
Source	Rating
Allmusic	4/5 stars

Got You on My Mind was originally released in March 1961 by Capitol Records. It was distributed as a vinyl LP offered in both mono and stereo formats. Both sides of the disc featured six tracks. It was Shepard's third studio album in her career and fourth overall. In the 2010s decade, it was re-released to digital platforms including Apple Music. The album was met with positive reception after its release. Billboard named it one of its "Spotlight Winners of the Week", calling the album "a collection of attractive songs performed stylishly". The publication also believed the disc's musical style could help it win over pop markets. AllMusic later gave the album four out of five stars. While no written review was given, the website did find both "Blues Stay Away from Me" and "Another" to be album "track picks".

== Track listing ==
Side one
No.	Title	Writer(s)	Length
1.	"Big Midnight Special"	Wilma Lee Cooper	2:09
2.	"Blues Stay Away from Me"	Alton Delmore; Henry Glover; Wayne Raney	2:50
3.	"Waltz of the Angels"	Dick Reynolds; Jack Rhodes	3:08
4.	"Another"	Roy Drusky; Vic McAlpin	2:46
5.	"One White Rose"	Shorty Long	2:05
6.	"I Don't Apologize for Loving You"	Velma Burns	2:28

Side two
No.	Title	Writer(s)	Length
1.	"Under Your Spell Again"	Buck Owens; Dusty Rhodes	2:51
2.	"You're the Only Good Thing"	Chuck Gregory; Jack Toombs	1:56
3.	"Got You on My Mind"	Howard Biggs; Joe Thomas	2:02
4.	"If You Haven't, You Can't Feel the Way That I Do"	Bill Carter	2:27
5.	"Mockin' Bird Hill"	Vaughn Horton	2:38
6.	"The Color Song (I Lost My Love)"	Bergman; Wise; Milton Leeds	2:33

== Release history ==
Region	Date	Format	Label	Ref.
North America	March 1961	Vinyl LP (Mono); Vinyl LP (Stereo)	Capitol Records	
North America	circa 2010	Music download; streaming	Capitol Records Nashville	
