= Slippin' Away (Jean Shepard song) =

Single by Jean Shepard

from the album Slippin' Away
- B-side: "Think I'll Go Somewhere and Cry Myself To Sleep"
- Released: May 1973
- Recorded: March 1973
- Studio: House of Cash
- Genre: Country
- Length: 2:27
- Label: United Artists
- Songwriter: Bill Anderson
- Producer: Larry Butler

Jean Shepard singles chronology
"Just Like Walkin' in the Sunshine" (1972)	"Slippin' Away" (1973)	"Come on Phone" (1973)

"Slippin' Away" is a song written by American singer-songwriter Bill Anderson and was originally recorded by American country singer Jean Shepard. Inspired to write the song while watching an old film, Shepard chose to the song to record and it was released as her first single for the United Artists label in 1973. It became her first top ten US country song in several years and was issued on an album of the same name.

== Background and composition ==
Bill Anderson had a recording career of his own, with hit singles like "Po Folks" (1961) and "Still" (1963). As a songwriter, he wrote a series of songs for other country artists such as Ray Price's "City Lights" (1958) and Connie Smith's "Once a Day" (1964). One of his 1970s compositions was "Slippin' Away". Anderson was inspired to write the song while watching an old movie in a hotel room. Anderson recalled one of the actors saying in the film, "Well, Monday's promise is Tuesday's lie", which inspired him to write a song. According to Anderson, he began "fooling" with the lines until he completed the words and the music. He did not title the song until a later date. The song's lyrics describe a relationship that is beginning to fall apart and its main character is attempting to save it from its demise.

== Recording ==
Jean Shepard was one of country music's first successful solo female artists. She had top ten and top 40 singles between the 1950s and 1970s, most of which were with Capitol Records. Shepard had left Capitol's roster in 1972 after believing the label was not promoting her music. Instead she signed with the United Artists label. Shepard had been associated with Anderson for many years and was a former cast member of his televised variety show in 1965. According to Anderson himself, Shepard chose to record the song and make it her first release for her new label. In her autobiography, Shepard named Anderson among her favorite songwriters and commented, "He could write a song that just kinda fit me." "Slippin' Away" was produced by Larry Butler, who had been recording her music since 1969 and helped her sign to United Artists. The song was cut at the House of Cash recording studio in Hendersonville, Tennessee in March 1973.

== Critical reception ==
Music critics and writers took notice of "Slippin' Away" following its release. Billboard noted a change in a production direction for Shepard's music with the song. They also believed the track would receive "immediate attention" and called Shepard's vocals "better than ever". Writer Robert K. Oermann and Cash Box noticed that the song had an uptempo rhythm. Oermann wrote found that the song (along with several follow-up releases) embodied a "hand-clapping, gospel-flavored, up-tempo" style not previously seen in her production. Cash Box wrote, "This hand-clapping, toe-tapping ditty about petty domestic quarrels that erode love's labors should ride high on playlists."

== Release and chart performance ==
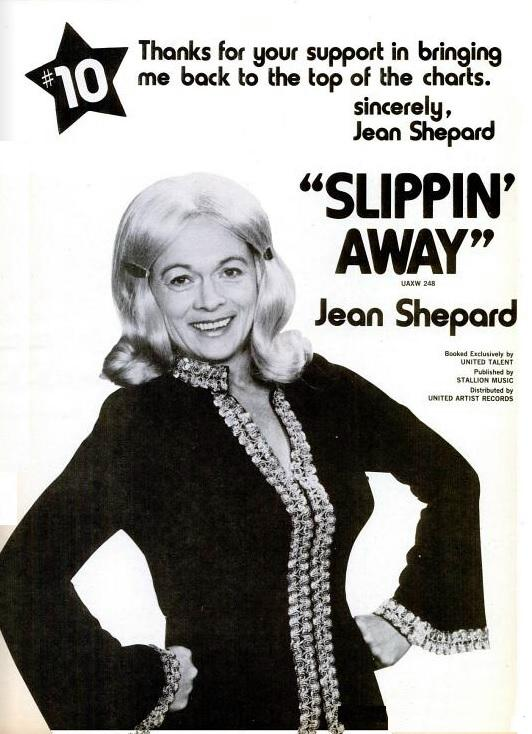
An advertisement in Billboard magazine following the commercial success of "Slippin' Away" on their record charts.

"Slippin' Away" was released in May 1973 by United Artists Records. The label distributed it as a seven-inch vinyl disc, with a B-side song (also written by Bill Anderson) called "Think I'll Go Somewhere and Cry Myself to Sleep". "Slippin' Away" entered the Billboard charts in June 1973. It reached the top ten of the US Hot Country Songs chart in mid 1973, rising to the number four position. It was Shepard's highest-peaking single since 1964's "Second Fiddle (To an Old Guitar)" and her first top ten song on the chart since 1970s' "Then He Touched Me". "Slippin' Away" would also be her final top ten country songs entry.

It also rose to the number three position on Canada's RPM Country Tracks chart, becoming her highest-peaking and only top ten single there. "Slippin' Away" also briefly appeared on the US Billboard Hot 100 chart, rising to number 81 in 1973. It was Shepard's first charting pop entry since 1953's "Forgive Me, John" and her final chart appearance there. The song inspired the release of Shepard's twentieth studio album in September 1973, also titled Slippin' Away.

== Track listing ==
7" vinyl single (US, German and Australian versions)

- "Slippin' Away" – 2:27
- "Think I'll Go Somewhere and Cry Myself to Sleep" – 2:45

== Charts ==
=== Weekly charts ===
Weekly chart performance for "Slippin' Away"
Chart (1973)	Peak position
Canada Country Tracks (RPM)	3
US Billboard Hot 100	81
US Hot Country Songs (Billboard)	4

=== Year-end charts ===
Year-end chart performance for "Slippin' Away"
Chart (1973)	Position
US Hot Country Songs (Billboard)	48
