= Larry Butler (producer) =

American singer-songwriter

Larry Butler (March 26, 1942 – January 20, 2012) was a country music producer and songwriter. From the mid-1970s through the 1980s, he worked with Kenny Rogers. Many of his albums with Rogers went either gold or platinum and accumulated millions of sales around the world. These albums include Kenny Rogers (1976), The Gambler (1978), Gideon (1980) and I Prefer The Moonlight (1987). Rogers and Butler maintained a friendship outside of show business. Butler also produced Rogers' 1993 album If Only My Heart Had A Voice. He also participated in Rogers 2006 retrospective DVD The Journey.

Butler is the only Nashville producer to win the Grammy Award for Producer of the year.

Butler replaced Jimmy Johnson who played trumpet and keyboards as a founding member of the Gentrys. Johnson played the famous organ part on “Keep On Dancing” but he departed to start college in 1965 when Butler replaced him.

== Career ==
Born in Pensacola, Florida, Butler began his career at the age of six with the Harry James Orchestra; at age ten he sang with Red Foley, and before he was old enough to drive he had hosted his own radio show and played piano on The Lynn Toney Show, a live television show in his market. He eventually joined a Florida band, Jerry Woodward and the Esquires. While on a trip to Nashville, he met a noted publisher/producer, Buddy Killen of Tree International. In 1963, with Killen's encouragement, Butler moved to Nashville with only a few dollars in his pocket. Soon his unique style of piano playing supported such hits as "Hello Darlin" by Conway Twitty and "Honey" by Bobby Goldsboro. Butler was in high demand as a Nashville session player and backed up Nashville celebrities such as Johnny Cash, Roger Miller, George Jones, Tammy Wynette, Loretta Lynn, Dolly Parton, Bobby Goldsboro, Jerry Lee Lewis, Charlie Rich, Lynn Anderson and more.

Moving to Memphis in the late 1960s, Butler hooked-up with Chips Moman. Butler played keyboards in the rock group Ronny and the Daytonas, who had a hit song with "GTO". Later, as a member of The Gentrys, they hit the pop charts with "Keep on Dancing" and "Every Day I Have to Cry Some". During that same period, Butler co-wrote the Poppies hit single "Lullaby Of Love". He was signed as a solo artist and served as Bobby Goldsboro's pianist and music director.

Butler returned to Nashville to join Capitol Records as an in-house producer. The first single he produced, "Seven Lonely Days", became a Billboard Top-20 Country single for Jean Shepard in 1969. Moving on to CBS Records at the urging of legendary producer Billy Sherrill, Butler worked closely with Johnny Cash producing some of "the man in black"'s biggest hits in the 1970s. So successful was the partnership that Butler became Cash's producer, pianist, musical director and studio manager. He even was given a solo track (a piano instrumental) on the album The Johnny Cash Family Christmas in 1972.

In 1973, Butler made one of his most significant career moves by joining United Artists Records as head of the label's Nashville division. His leadership and vision brought in such acts as Kenny Rogers, Crystal Gayle, Dottie West and The Kendalls and established the label as one of the most successful and respected in Nashville.

Butler teamed again with Chips Moman and penned the number 1 hit "(Hey Won't You Play) Another Somebody Done Somebody Wrong Song". Topping the charts for both Pop and Country, the song became one of B. J. Thomas' greatest career hits. It was a BMI 3 million performance song and earned Butler a Grammy for Song of the Year.

Eventually Butler left UA and started his own independent company, Larry Butler Productions. His acts included

- Charlie Rich ("You're Gonna Love Yourself in the Morning")
- Mac Davis ("It's Hard to Be Humble")
- Debby Boone ("Are You on the Road to Loving Me Again")
- Billie Jo Spears ("Blanket on the Ground")
- Don McLean ("Crying")
- John Denver ("Some Days Are Diamonds")

Butler's biggest success was producing Kenny Rogers. Their studio collaboration yielded many of Kenny's greatest hits including,

- "Lucille" (1977)
- "Love or Something Like It" (1978)
- "The Gambler" (1978)
- "She Believes in Me" (1979)
- "You Decorated My Life" (1979)
- "Coward of the County" (1979)

Butler was also behind teaming Kenny and Dottie West to record the duets "Everytime Two Fools Collide" and "'Til I Make It On My Own". Butler also worked with Kenny and Kim Carnes on their smash hit "Don't Fall in Love with a Dreamer".

1980 brought Butler to the spotlight again with his Grammy for Producer of the Year and solidified his reputation as a hit maker. Tammy Wynette cut Butler's "Only The Strong Will Survive" while Billie Joe Spears cut " Standing Tall" which was also released by Lorrie Morgan in 1996. Butler writing credits include songs for Tree, United Artists music, April Blackwood, Great Cumberland, EMI and, most recently, his own Larry Butler Music.

1984 was the year Butler formed his music publishing companies, Larry Butler Music Group, Inc. He signed writers Mickey Newbury, Dean Dillon, Bud McGuire, Paul Nelson, Marty Raybon, Julie Didier, Larry Jon Wilson, and Bob Melton. CBS Songs administered his catalog. Butler's new group quickly produced a string of hits for George Strait including "The Chair", "Ocean Front Property" and "It Ain't Cool". Also "Shine, Shine, Shine" for Eddy Raven, "Miami My Amy" for Keith Whitley, "The Factory" for Kenny Rogers, "I Just Called To Say Goodbye Again" for Larry Boone and "One Man Band" for Moe Bandy. LBMG produced additional songs for Vern Gosdin, Alabama, Shenandoah, Razzy Bailey, T. G. Sheppard, Tracy Lawrence and more. And, Butler wrote "Wonder What You'll Do When I'm Gone" for Waylon Jennings, putting the company on the map. During a period of two years LBMG produced five Number Ones, eight Top Tens and numerous Top Forty chart records and album cuts.

Butler died in his sleep in Pensacola, Florida on January 20, 2012. Before dying he collaborated with musician and songwriter Dave Goodenough to co-write a book titled "Just for the Record." It contains many of Butler's humorous anecdotes from the music industry and a plethora of advice for those aspiring to succeed in the various aspects of the music business, as well as life in general. It includes contributions from many of the top people in the music business, along with a foreword by Kenny Rogers. The book was published in November 2012.

== Awards ==
- 1976: Grammy Award for Best Country Song for "(Hey Won't You Play) Another Somebody Done Somebody Wrong Song" by B.J. Thomas
- 1980: Grammy Award for Producer of the Year

== See also ==
- Music of the United States
